= History of Alfa Romeo =

History of Italian automotive manufacturer Alfa Romeo

The history of Alfa Romeo, an Italian car manufacturer known for producing sports cars, began on June 24, 1910, with the founding of ALFA (an acronym for "Anonima Lombarda Fabbrica Automobili") in Milan. In 1918 the company changed its name to "Alfa Romeo" following the acquisition of control of the company by Nicola Romeo.

In 1933 ownership of Alfa Romeo passed, through IRI, to the Italian state because of the heavy debt the company had incurred with banks since the previous decade. Alfa Romeo continued to produce cars in a semi-craftsmanship manner until the early 1950s, when it transformed into a full-fledged automobile manufacturer with the introduction of the assembly line in the production departments. From this decade on, Alfa Romeo experienced a phase of growing success that reached its peak in the 1960s. In the 1970s, however, there was a turnaround that caused a deep crisis. The failing finances then led the Italian state, in 1986, to sell the automaker to the Fiat group. The revival of Alfa Romeo took place in the second part of the 1990s. In 2014, it became part of the brands controlled by Fiat Chrysler Automobiles and from 2021 by Stellantis.

== ALFA ==
Alfa Romeo's origins have French and Neapolitan roots. The genesis of the brand is linked to the founding of the Società Italiana Automobili Darracq, which was opened in Naples on April 6, 1906. However, the entrepreneurial venture immediately proved to be fraught with difficulties, especially because of the high distance between Naples and France. For this reason, as early as the end of 1906, the company was relocated to Milan with the construction of a factory in the Portello area. The first industrial settlement that was the origin of Alfa Romeo, and which remained active until 1986, was built on a vast square bordering the areas that had hosted the Milan International. However, difficulties continued and sales proved insufficient to ensure the survival of the manufacturing business. Because of these problems, as early as the end of 1909 the company was put into liquidation and was then taken over by some Lombard entrepreneurs, who purchased it in 1910 together with Ugo Stella, who participated in the transaction.

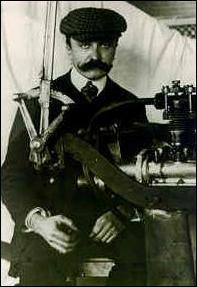
Giuseppe Merosi

The change of ownership took place on June 24, 1910, at which time the company changed its name to ALFA (an acronym for "Anonima Lombarda Fabbrica Automobili"). The name chosen recalled the first letter of the Greek alphabet, intended to emphasize the beginning of a new industrial adventure.

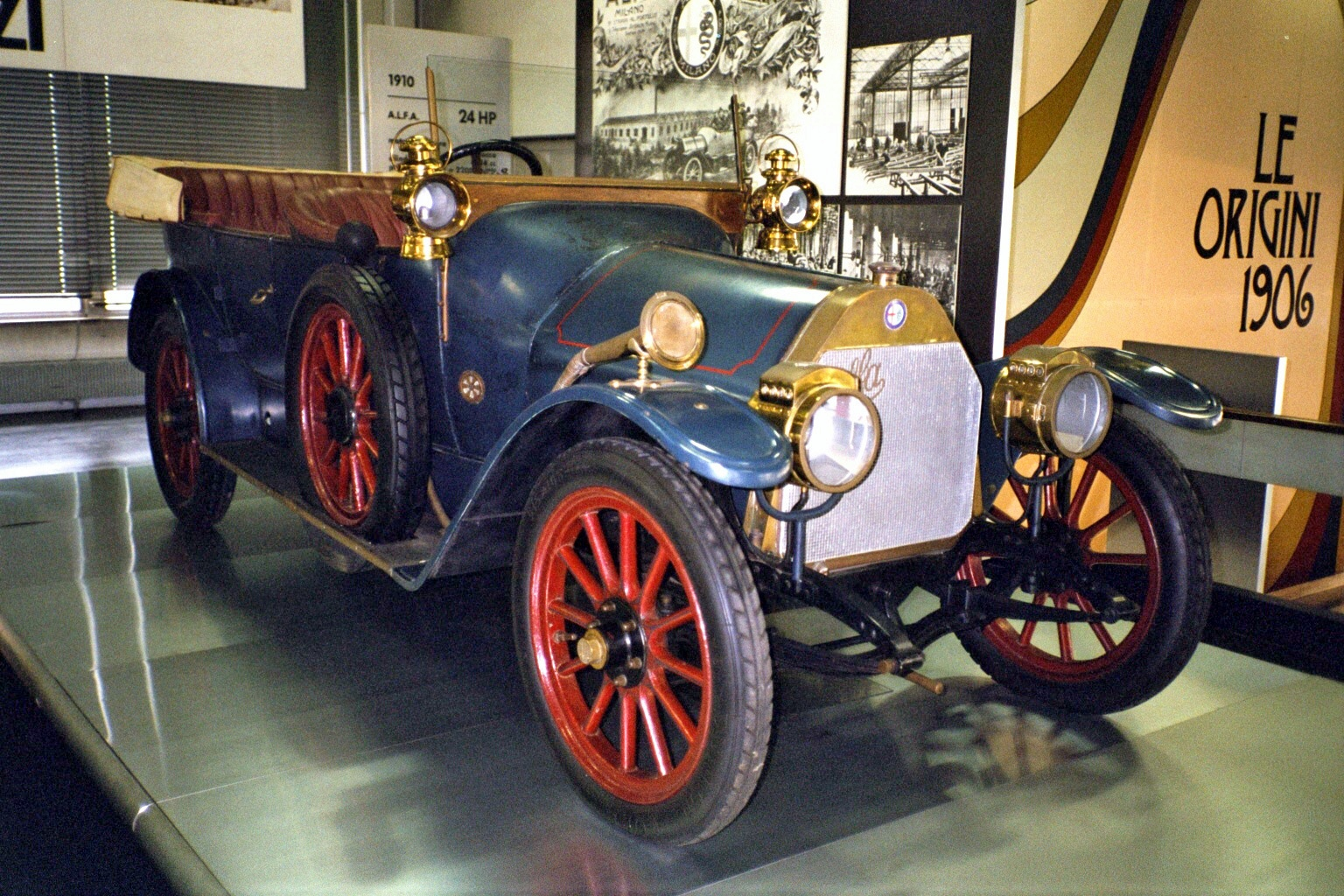
A 1910 ALFA 24 HP bodied by Castagna Milano

At this point, the new management recognized the need to completely revise its models by adapting them to the needs of the Italian market, and therefore decided to hire Giuseppe Merosi, a designer from Piacenza with several years of experience in the fledgling Italian automobile industry to his credit. Merosi, who therefore became the first technical manager of the fledgling car company, was given the task of designing a totally new car model. The company's first logo was also designed on the occasion. Sketched by Merosi himself, the mark recalled ALFA's ties with its city of origin: on one side the Visconti serpent (the "biscione"), on the other the red cross on a white field, the medieval symbol of Milan. Surrounding the two emblems were the inscriptions "ALFA" and "MILANO" divided by two Savoy knots in honor of the Italian ruling house.

The new model was launched as early as the same year in which the change of ownership took place. Designed by Merosi, the ALFA 24 HP possessed an inline four-cylinder, side-valve engine with a displacement of 4.1 L (4,084 cc) that delivered 42 hp (31 kW) of power (the 24 HP in the model name referred instead to fiscal power). The 24 HP was designed considering the shortcomings of the Darracq models, and was therefore equipped with a very strong structure and a powerful engine that allowed the car to reach the remarkable speed (for the time) of 100 km/h. The model ensured reliability due to the preliminary tests that were carried out before the launch at the behest of Giuseppe Merosi, and thus sales of the ALFA gradually began to grow. However, the 24 HP was marketed with a "bare" chassis, that is, without the body; at the time, it was common to sell the models produced without the body, so as to give buyers the opportunity to complete them according to their personal tastes by taking them to their trusted coachbuilder.

From the 24 HP was derived the first truck model built by Alfa Romeo. Made in 1914, it was produced through a substantial modification of the car's structure. This truck inaugurated a tradition that marked the Biscione company for decades. Alfa Romeo produced commercial vehicles until 1988 and was, after FIAT, the Italian company that built this type of transport vehicle for the longest time.

The 24 HP was successful and so, in the same year, a smaller car, the 12 HP, was launched, which was equipped with a 2.4 L (2,413 cc) and 22 hp (16 kW) inline-four engine. Both the powerplant and chassis of the 12 HP were derived from those of the 24 HP. In 1911 the 12 HP was updated by installing an upgraded version of the engine, which now delivered 24 hp (18 kW); for this reason, the model changed its name to 15 HP, as the fiscal horsepower also changed although the displacement remained the same. The 15 HP in 1914 underwent a similar update to that which had led to its birth. These changes mainly involved the engine: the displacement was kept the same in exchange for an increase in power output, which grew to 28 hp (21 kW). From these changes came the 15-20 HP. In contrast, the previous year (1913) the successor model to the 24 HP, the 40-60 HP, had been launched. This new car was basically the fruit of the development of the previous model and marked a turning point for the carmaker's car design, owing to the high engineering level of its mechanics. The new model had mounted a 6.1 L (6,082 cc), 70 hp (51 kW) six-cylinder engine that differed from previous powerplants by having overhead valves instead of valves on the side.

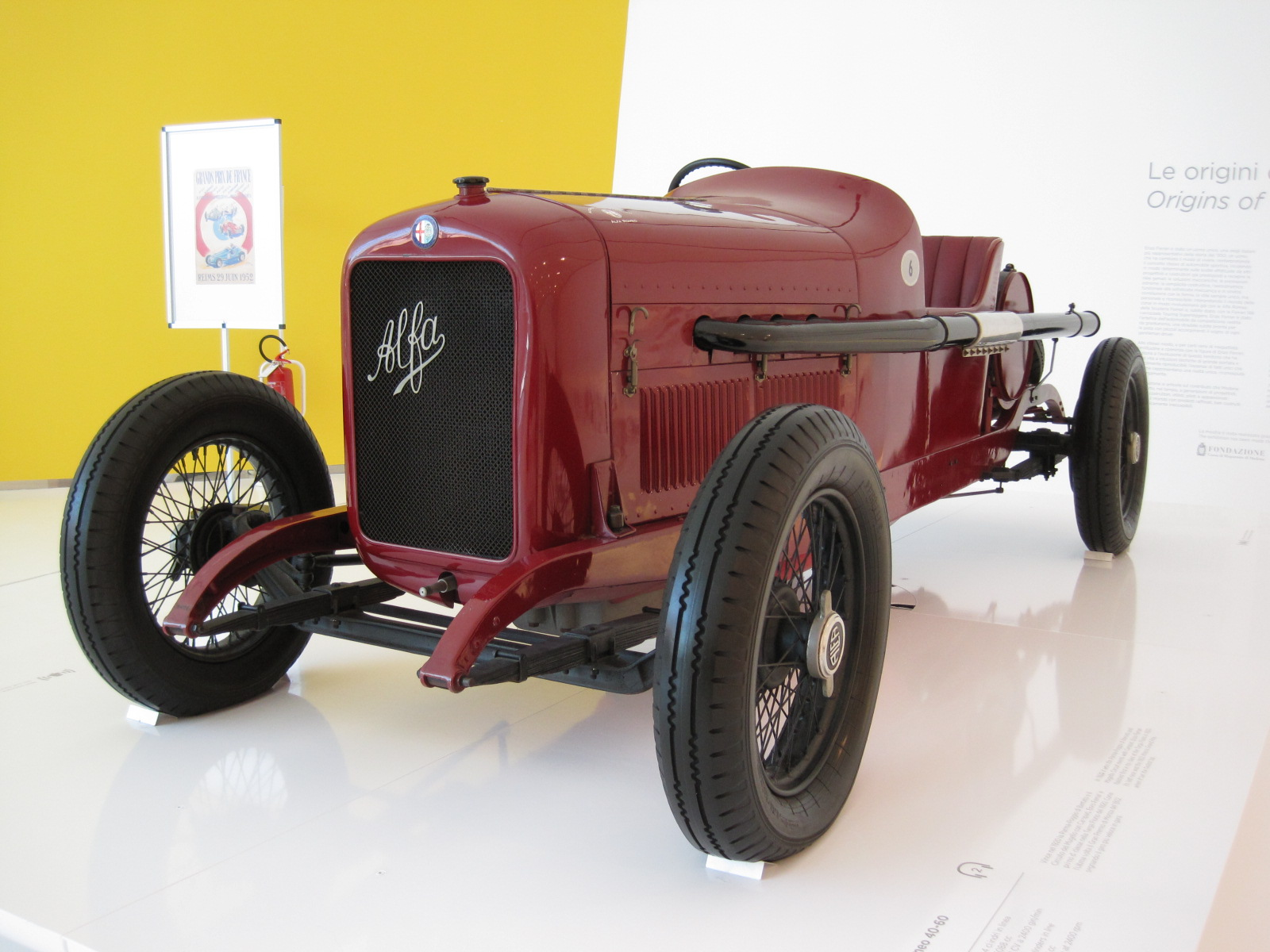
A 40-60 HP ALFA for racing

In 1911 ALFA debuted, with the 24 HP, in motor racing. In an attempt to win new buyers, ALFA's management was considering the launch of a new car that was to feature a more luxurious trim level and a higher price, at least by the standards of previous models. However, the idea was soon shelved because of the risks involved, which were related to a possible negative response from the market and the danger of losing the already acquired customers, who were accustomed to the peculiarities of ALFA's previous cars: therefore, their reaction to a completely new type of car could not be predicted. It was therefore decided to prepare a racing model, which with its eventual successes could attract new buyers. Merosi was therefore commissioned to transform two 24 HP examples into cars suitable for racing. The goal was achieved by lightening the two vehicles, which was achieved, for example, by eliminating the bodywork; in addition, the wheelbase was shortened and the axles were replaced. These examples were entered in the 1911 Targa Florio, but without success; the disappointing results were then repeated the following year. Nevertheless, success in racing came in 1913 with a racing version of the 40-60 HP. The model won the Parma-Poggio di Berceto finishing first in its class and second overall.

The victory of the 40-60 HP gave ALFA the impetus to continue its participation in competitions, and this resulted in the design of a racing model suitable for participation in Grand Prix motor racing, which attracted more public interest than endurance races. In 1914 Giuseppe Merosi was therefore commissioned to design a useful model for the purpose, employing an existing car as the basis of the design again, since making a new model from scratch would have required too many financial resources. Thus in 1914 the ALFA Grand Prix was born, which was derived from the 40-60 HP and was the first car designed by the Biscione company to be intended exclusively for competition. The model featured innovations regarding engine technology: it had a double overhead camshaft timing system and possessed dual ignition per cylinder. The power unit was the Biscione company's first engine to have these features and was therefore the forerunner of Alfa Romeo's Twin Cam engine and Twin Spark ignition system, which were produced a few decades later. Due to the outbreak of World War I, in which Italy did not initially take part, the organization of international competitions was suspended and thus the ALFA Grand Prix had a rather short racing activity.

== The birth of the Alfa Romeo brand ==
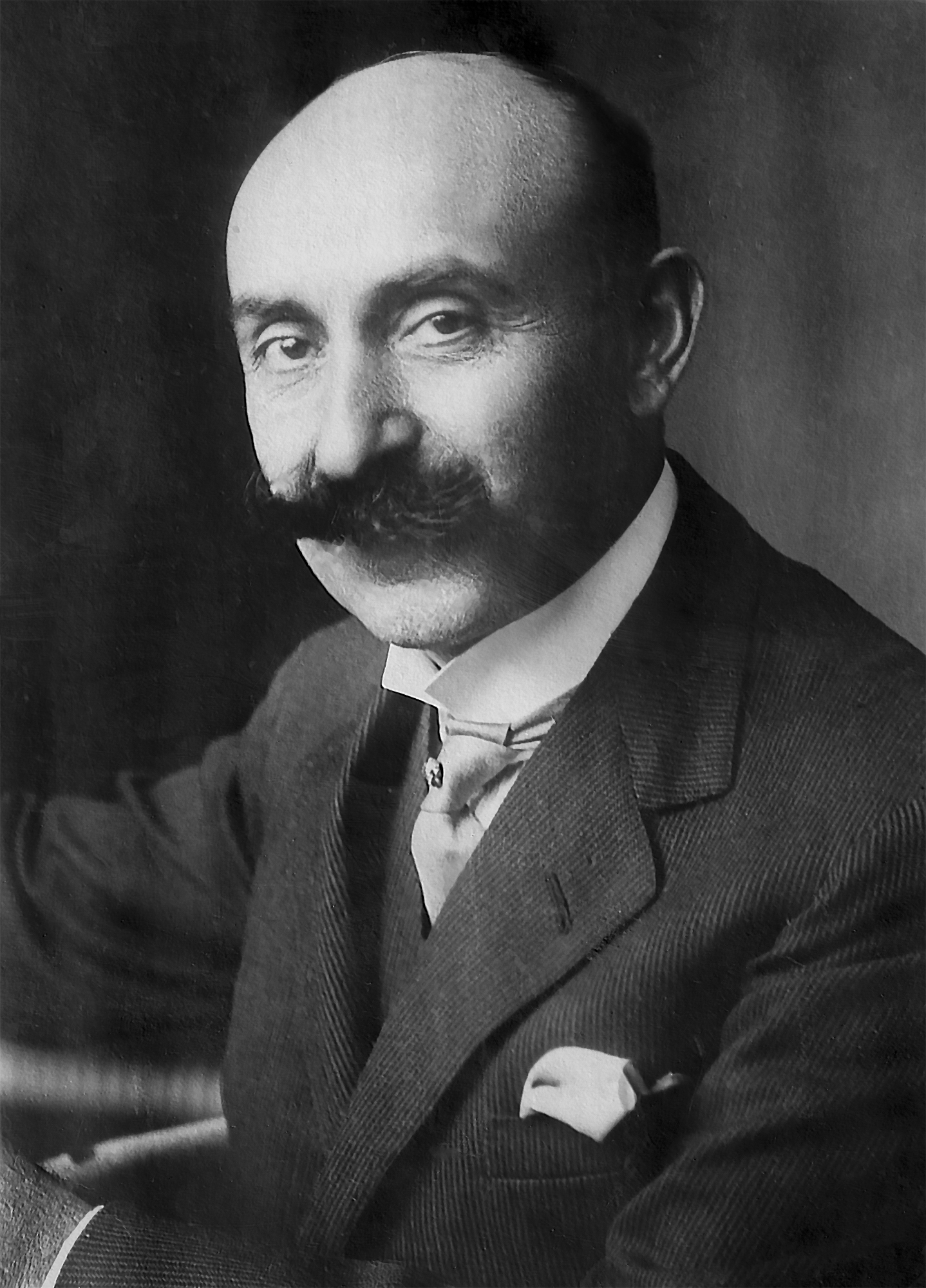
Nicola Romeo

Before Italy's entry into the war, ALFA's sales gradually increased from 80 cars in 1911 to 150 in 1912, 200 in 1913, 272 in 1914 and then dropped to 207 in 1915. With the outbreak of the conflict (1914), the Milanese automaker entered a crisis due to the stagnation of the domestic car market and the interruption of exports. ALFA was in those years broadening its commercial horizons by also targeting foreign markets. The situation precipitated with Italy's entry into the war (1915). The national manufacturing apparatus converted its industrial activities to meet the demand for wartime supplies and this put ALFA in a difficult situation: the owners of the Milanese car manufacturer did not possess the financial resources to convert plants for this purpose. An attempt was made, however, by Merosi to modify the engine of the 15-20 HP into a generator suitable for the Royal Army, but without success. To avoid being in a situation where the factory would no longer produce profits, the ownership therefore decided to sell the ALFA to the Banca Italiana di Sconto.

The bank identified Nicola Romeo, a mechanical engineer from Sant'Antimo, as a potential buyer who could manage and later buy ALFA. Previously Romeo, after having had some experience abroad, had founded in 1911 in Milan the "Società in accomandita semplice Ing. Nicola Romeo e Co." for the production of machinery for mining. After the outbreak of war, the Neapolitan entrepreneur decided to enter the military contracting business, obtaining a significant order for the Royal Army in July 1915, which involved the production of ammunition. Since his company did not possess the resources to fulfill this order, Nicola Romeo decided to take over ALFA by entering the company's capital by purchasing some shares. On August 4, 1915, Nicola Romeo was appointed director of the Portello plant, and within two years the industrial group led by the engineer from Sant'Antimo managed to gain control of the company; on this occasion, ALFA changed its name to "Società Anonima Italiana Ing. Nicola Romeo." It then concentrated on the manufacture of ammunition (75 mm shells loaded on 75 Krupp and Déport guns and 149 caliber shells loaded on 149/35 guns), flamethrowers, generating sets (using the engine of the 15-20 HP and mounted on special carriages supplied by Bollani coachworks), aircraft engines under license from Isotta-Fraschini, and mining equipment, which were essential in the trenches of the Italian front, temporarily discontinuing the production of cars. The mining equipment was driven by air compressors, officially named Motocompressor Type C (Cadottato) but known as "Il Piccolo Italiano," which were designed by Merosi and were powered by the engines already mounted on the 15 HP and 24 HP. In this context, due to the conflicting relationship that existed between Merosi and Romeo the designer from Piacenza was sent to southern Italy to lead a factory owned by the engineer from Sant'Antimo.

When the war ended, military orders came to an end and Romeo decided to convert the company's activities back to the production of cars for civilian use. This process was facilitated by inventories of car components that had been made before the conflict and by the substantial funds set aside by Romeo from military supplies. At the same time, Bolinder heavy oil engines for fishing boats were imported. Romeo, who was aware of the value of the ALFA brand name in the marketing of passenger car models, decided to change the name of the company to "Alfa Romeo." The official act of Alfa Romeo's birth is dated February 3, 1918, and was signed by notary Federico Guasti of Milan. In the same year Merosi returned to the company following the settlement of conflicts with Romeo. This was also achieved by revising the contract that bound Merosi to the Portello car manufacturer, including an extraordinary payment based on the number of cars sold.

Financial liquidity had also previously been used, by Romeo's group, to purchase other mechanical companies: the Costruzioni Meccaniche di Saronno, Officine Ferroviarie Meridionali of Naples, and Officine Ferroviarie Romane. With them Romeo built rolling stock until 1925. However, Romeo did not own a majority shareholding in the companies of his group: additional shareholders were in fact the Banca Italiana di Sconto and other financiers. Despite not owning a majority, Romeo nevertheless managed to have absolute control of the companies he led. From 1918 to 1921 the company led by Romeo produced a model of agricultural tractor under license from International Harvester, the Romeo. The Romeo had little commercial success, mainly on the basis of its technical characteristics, which had been obsolete for a few years. An example of the Romeo is preserved at the Alfa Romeo Historical Museum in Arese. This was the only agricultural tractor model marketed by the Portello company.

== The early postwar period and the 1920s ==
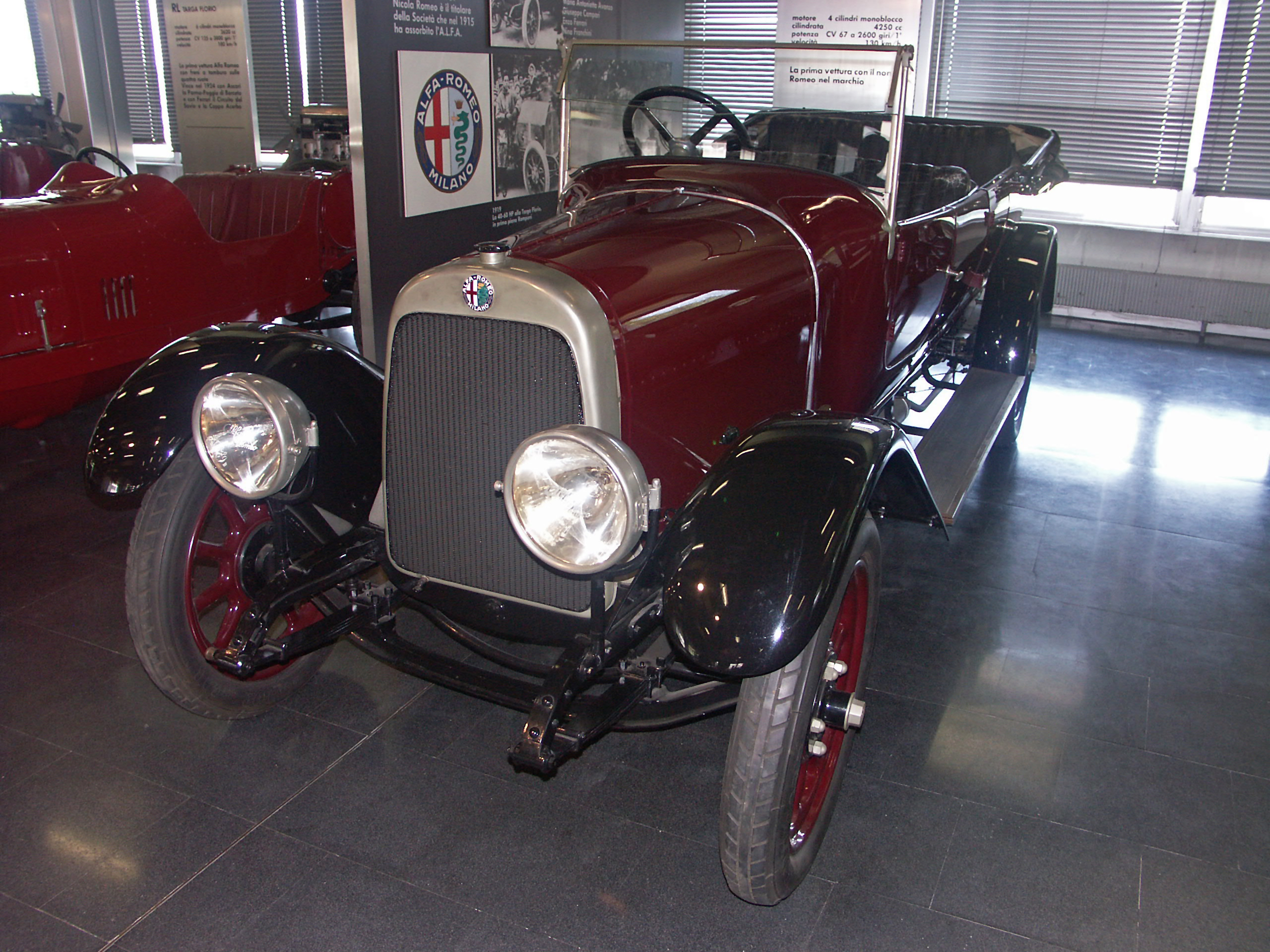
An Alfa Romeo 20-30 HP

The first passenger car model produced after the end of World War I from stock was the prewar 15/20 HP, the marketing of which resumed in 1919. However, it was necessary to wait until 1920 before normal car production resumed, when the Alfa Romeo 20-30 HP was launched, which was thus the first road model to be marketed under the company's new name. The Alfa Romeo brand had already debuted on November 23, 1919, on a racing version of the 40-60 HP, which participated in the Targa Florio.

In 1921 a new model designed by Merosi was launched, the G1. The 40-60 HP had become obsolete, so Alfa Romeo's offerings needed a completely new high-end model. The G1, because of its imposing size, was the largest Alfa Romeo ever built up to that time. The model, however, had no market in Italy partly because of high taxation, which, being calculated according to displacement, penalized models with large-cubic capacity engines. The 50 expensive examples produced were therefore all sold in Australia.

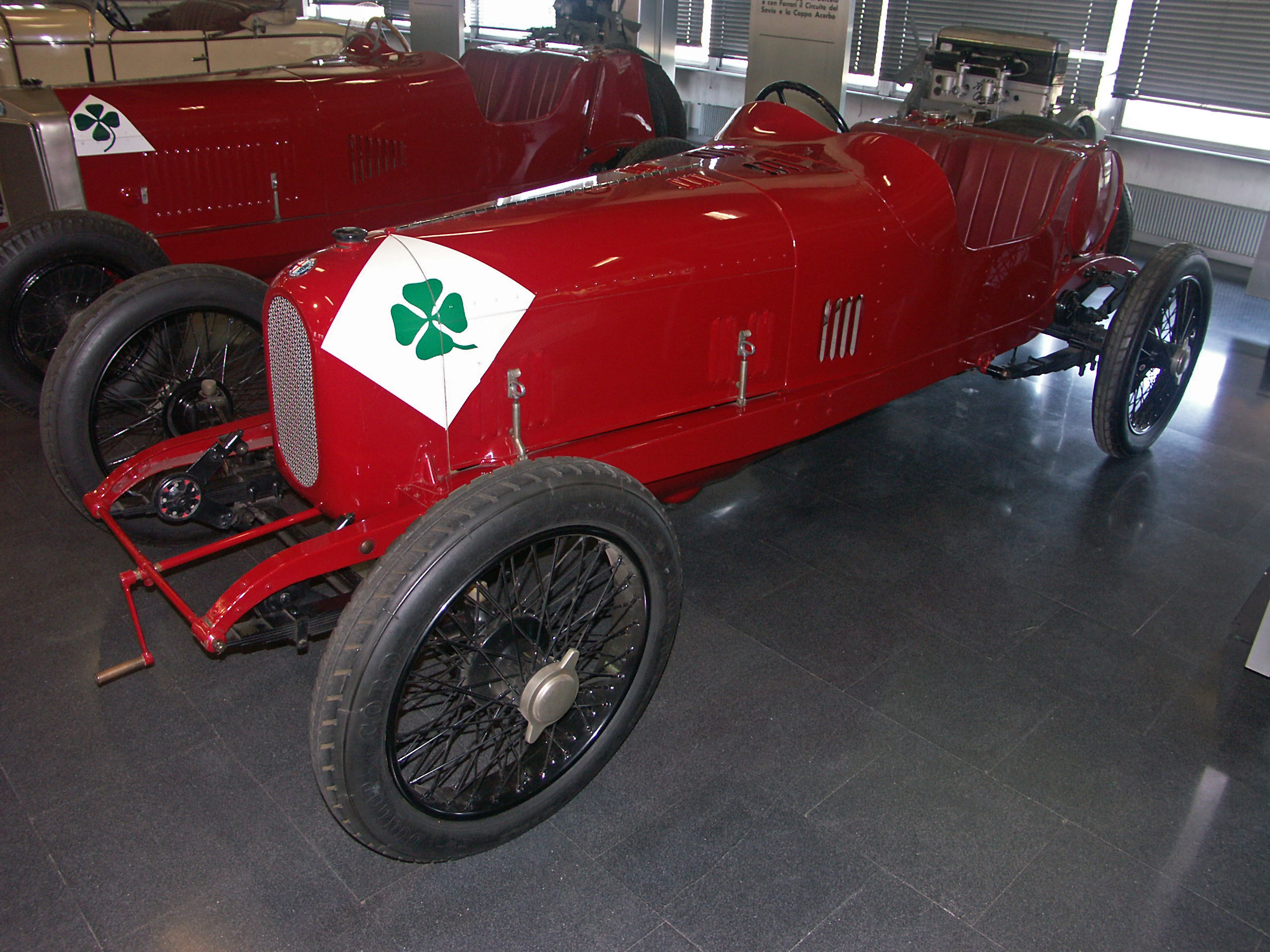
Ugo Sivocci's Alfa Romeo RL Targa Florio

Business deteriorated because of low sales. The reasons for this poor success lay in the almost total absence of a dealer network and the corporate disorganization that originated from Romeo's management, who, as a result, began to get into debt with banks. Business did not improve even with the launch of a new car that was equipped with a six-cylinder engine designed by Merosi, the RL. The new model was received lukewarmly by the market precisely because of the engine, which featured relatively low power. However, the RL was launched on the markets to complete the range with a road model whose competition version would have to meet the new Grand Prix regulations, which called for a reduction in the maximum displacement of participating cars. Nevertheless, the RL was important for the history of the manufacturer: on one example of the competition version, the Alfa Romeo four-leaf clover symbol made its debut, which would appear in all the Milanese manufacturer's competitive activities and on the sportiest versions of its cars from then on. The four-leaf clover was painted by the driver Ugo Sivocci on his car at the 1923 Targa Florio for superstitious reasons, since the model was entered in the competition with the number 13; with this symbol the driver from Salerno won the first victory in his career. The achievement was also Alfa Romeo's first in the famous Sicilian competition. In the 1920s Alfa Romeo successfully expanded its sporting activities thanks to drivers of the caliber of Antonio Ascari, Giuseppe Campari, Enzo Ferrari and Sivocci. As a result of its racing victories, Alfa Romeo achieved international fame.

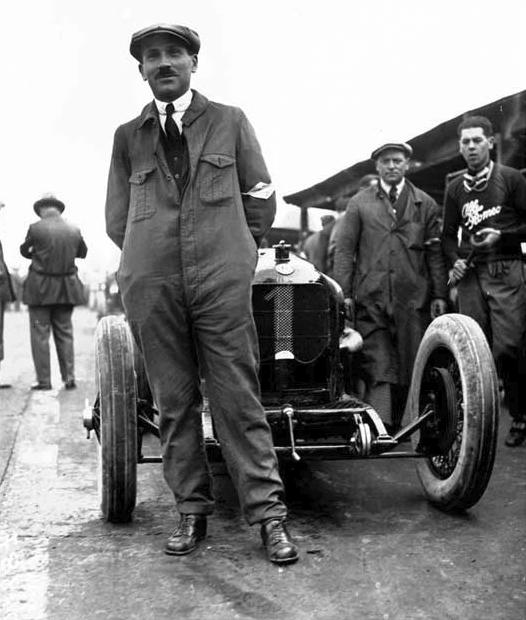
Vittorio Jano and an Alfa Romeo P2

In the financial sphere, Alfa Romeo's situation worsened with the bankruptcy in 1921 of the Banca Italiana di Sconto. This event was caused by the excessive indebtedness incurred by the companies, which were struggling with complications due to post-war reconversion. The bankrupt banking institution was taken over by the Bank of Italy through the Banca Nazionale di Credito, and thus part of the debts of the companies involved were basically managed by the Italian state. As a result, these companies were also administratively controlled de facto by the Italian state, and Alfa Romeo was no exception. In 1922 Benito Mussolini came to power; the leader of Fascism decided to make a cut in public spending and thus the Banca Nazionale di Credito was no longer able to lavish the substantial liquidity that had been provided until then. No longer having access to credit with relative ease, Alfa Romeo's situation thus worsened considerably and the possibility of closure was raised. In regard to the Milanese automaker, however, Mussolini was not as perplexed as he was about other industrial concerns in crisis. According to the Duce, Alfa Romeo's victories in automobile competitions gave the brand, and consequently Italy as well, a certain prestige. Mussolini therefore decided to save Alfa Romeo from closure. However, with sales continuing to languish, in 1925 the Banca Nazionale di Credito pulled its weight and ousted Romeo from the company, replacing him with Pasquale Gallo.

The tarnishing of the Alfa Romeo brand caused by the poor commercial success of the road models was mitigated by successes in competition, and in particular by the triumph of the Alfa Romeo P2 in the first organized world motor racing championship in history (1925), which was won thanks to the victories of Antonio Ascari and Gastone Brilli-Peri. They defeated drivers from the automakers that dominated the Grand Prix at the time and were therefore favorites for the title (Bugatti, Fiat, Delage, Sunbeam and Miller). To celebrate the victory, a laurel wreath was added to the edge of the Milanese automaker's coat of arms. The P2 was the first Alfa Romeo designed by Vittorio Jano, who in the meantime had replaced Merosi at the company's technical helm; the latter had left Alfa Romeo because of disagreements with Gallo. Notably, the decision to replace Merosi with Jano was made the day after Sivocci's death on a P1 during some tests. The ownership identified the technical director from Piacenza as the main culprit of the tragedy, and therefore decided to replace him. The choice of successor then fell on Jano, who was working at Fiat at the time. However, as the similarity between the world champion Alfa Romeo model and the Fiat 805 was evident, Giovanni Agnelli became convinced that Jano had used some designs from Fiat as the basis for P2, and so he turned to the relevant authorities. Subsequent investigations exonerated Jano: the two cars, despite their aesthetic similarity, were in fact mechanically very different. With Jano for Alfa Romeo began a period of great sporting success and technological advances that would later lead to the company's revival.

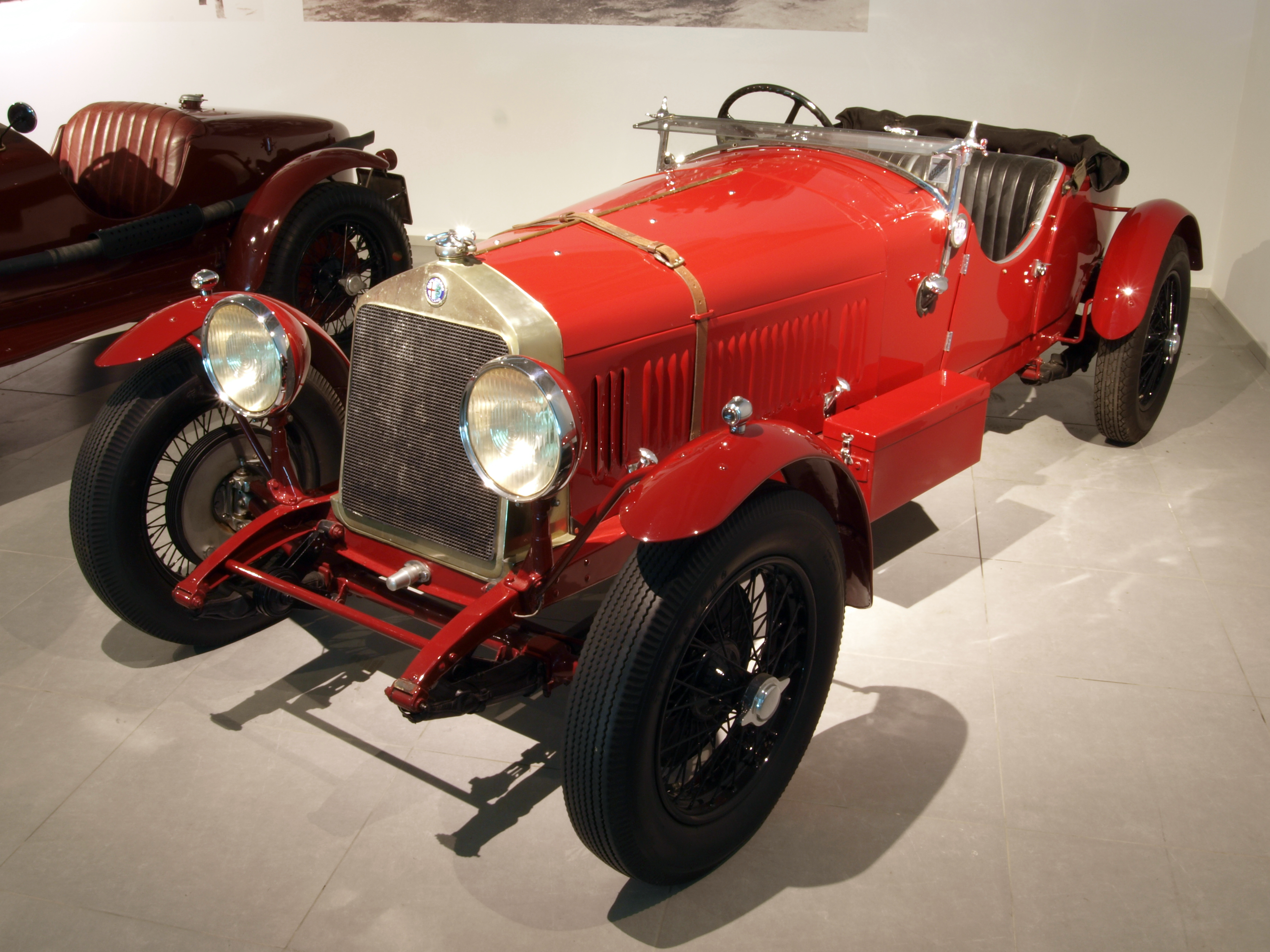
A 1929 Alfa Romeo 6C 1500

Participation in competitions was a means of increasing sales of civilian cars, and therefore it was essential to launch a model that, in the wake of winning the world championship, would drive sales by attracting new customers. Therefore, in 1927 Alfa Romeo presented the 6C 1500, which was an easy to handle, compact model. Designed by Jano, the 6C 1500 was derived from the P2 and was, from a technological point of view, equipped with exceptional features: it was fitted with a six-cylinder, overhead-valve engine of 1.5 L displacement, which was equipped with a single-shaft timing system. It was later upgraded by installing a double overhead camshaft on the Sport version. Due to the company's inefficiencies, however, the model was marketed at an excessively high price. In addition, the short-wheelbase version, which was the sports one, was not as successful as hoped, so the launch of the new car did not allow the Milanese automaker to capitalize on its victory at the world championship. Despite its lack of success, the 6C was nonetheless the progenitor model of a series of cars that would later go down in automotive history because of their performance, styling and reliability. The 6C 1500 was followed by the 6C 1750, which was derived from the parent model through an increase in engine displacement. The 6C 1500 Sport won, for the first time for Alfa Romeo, the Mille Miglia (1928). This success was followed by two more victories (1929 and 1930) that were achieved by the 6C 1750.

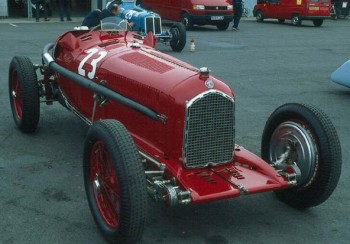
An Alfa Romeo P3

Meanwhile, due to the corporate vicissitudes that had involved Gallo, the company was still struggling despite the moderate upswing in sales that had been recorded thanks to the launch of the 6C 1750. Gallo was arrested because he was caught red-handed while attempting to provide aid to a staunch opponent of the Fascist regime, Cipriano Facchinetti, who wanted to flee Italy. Gallo's management, despite its short duration, was nevertheless characterized by a reorganization of production activities that was later important for the company's subsequent revival. At this point, the Duce himself chose Prospero Gianferrari as director, who further improved production processes and established a sector within Alfa Romeo that would be responsible for making the bodies, thus giving the company the opportunity to build complete cars. In addition, Gianferrari chose to diversify its production activities: in 1931 the first industrial vehicle not derived from road cars, the Alfa Romeo Tipo 50, was introduced, while in 1932 the first aircraft engine totally designed by Alfa Romeo, the D2, was presented, which was later mounted on the Caproni Ca.101. As for cars, during those years was the introduction in 1931 of the 8C 2300 and the launch of the 6C 2300. On the racing front, Jano designed, also in 1931, Alfa Romeo's first single-seater car, the Tipo A. However, the model, which was extraordinarily powerful due to the installation of two engines, was not very sturdy and difficult to control. From the same era is another racing car designed by Jano, the P3 ("Tipo B"); it is considered one of the best racing cars ever built due to the numerous victories won especially by Tazio Nuvolari.

== The 1930s and 1940s ==
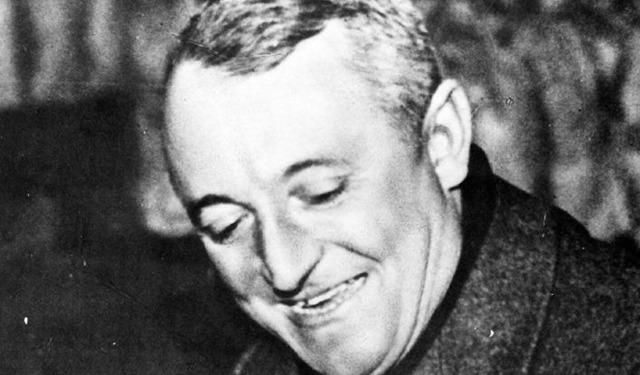
Ugo Gobbato

Despite its racing successes, Alfa Romeo's financial situation continued to be critical. Adding to the other problems in the 1930s was the great economic crisis that had begun in 1929 with the collapse of the Wall Street Stock Exchange and which precipitated the situation. In this context, in 1933, the Italian government decided to take over the shares of Alfa Romeo that were owned by banks, officially acquiring control of the company, which thus became state-owned. In this situation, as the finances continued to worsen, some members of the Treasury Ministry speculated about the closure of the carmaker. At this point Mussolini himself intervened again and decided, through the IRI (the state-owned corporation created for the purpose of supporting banks and companies in difficulty), to save the company, commissioning Ugo Gobbato to reorganize Alfa Romeo from both a financial and a production point of view. Mussolini's personal interest was not accidental: the Duce was a great admirer of Alfa Romeo especially for its racing achievements. It was again the latter that prompted Mussolini to go against the opinion of his ministry by deciding, for the second time, to save the Milanese automaker.

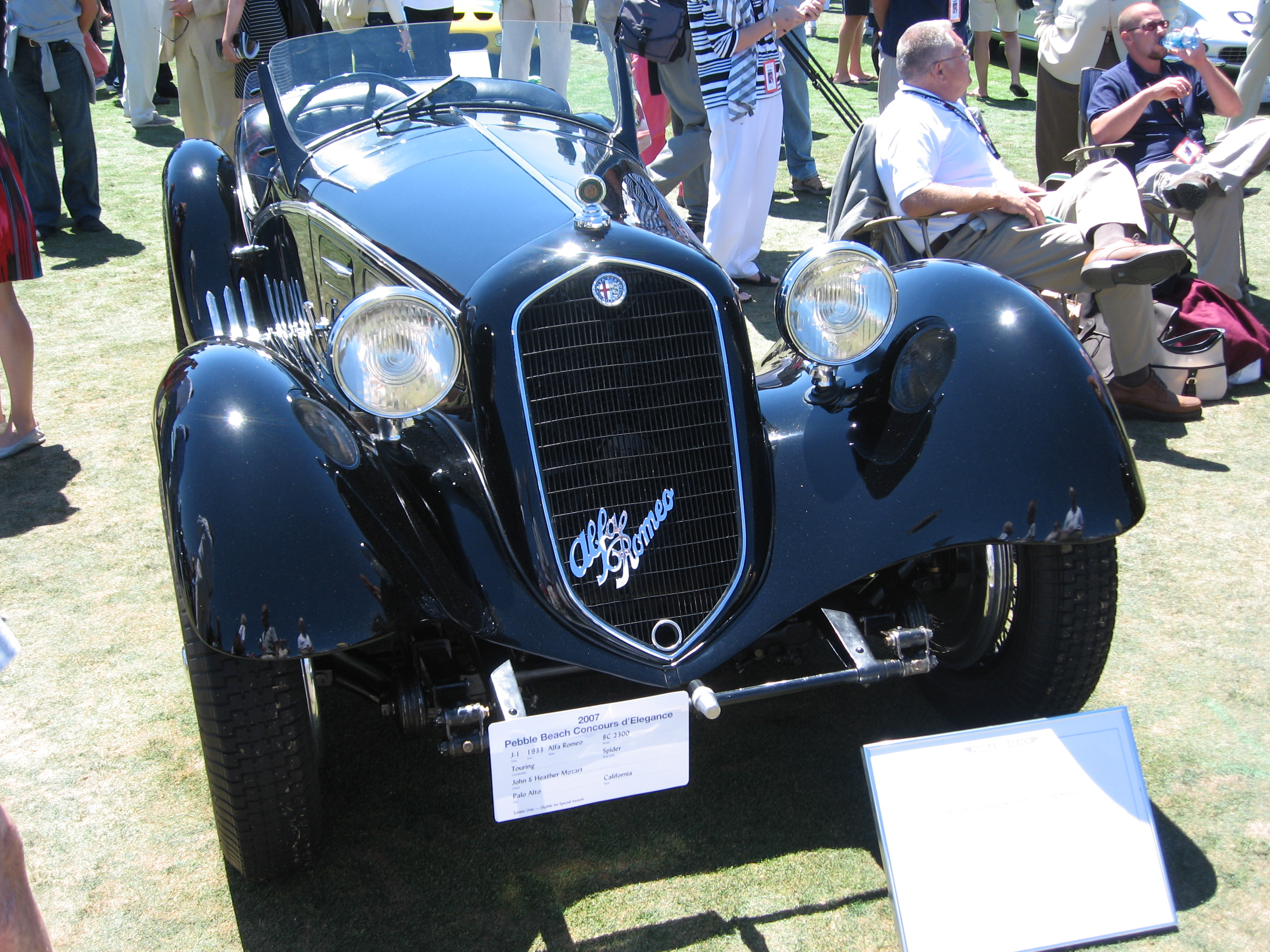
A 1933 Alfa Romeo 8C 2300

Alfa Romeo's rescue was achieved thanks to the joint work done by Jano and Gobbato: the former continued his work of designing new models, which were made consistently competitive in the market due to Gobbato's contribution to improving production processes. The 6C 2300 (which was characterized by a simpler structure and thus also sold well because of its lower price), the 6C 2500 (which was the more powerful and sumptuous version of the same model) and the large and luxurious 8C 2900 are from these years. Overall, the years leading up to World War II were characterized by powerful and refined models marked by elegant lines. In particular, the three models that later made Alfa Romeo a world-famous brand in the 1930s, even for road cars, were the 6C 1500, the 8C 2300, and the aforementioned 8C 2900.

In April 1936, Alfa Romeo established a corporate after-work section of its Milan plant. The football section debuted in the 1936-1937 Lombardy First Division championship, finishing the season in first place and thus gaining access to the Serie C. Starting with the 1937-1938 season, the Gruppo Calcio Alfa Romeo was formed, autonomous from the company's after-work section albeit connected to it. The following season Alfa Romeo hired – thanks in part to the prospect of stable employment as a mechanic – 18-year-old Valentino Mazzola, future captain of Grande Torino, who remained in the red jersey for only one season before moving to Venezia. The club played five seasons in the third division until the 1941-1942 season, after which it renounced its membership; it also played four editions of the Coppa Italia without ever passing the first elimination round.

In this context, in 1933 Gobbato decided to withdraw Alfa Romeo from official and direct participation in competitions, ceding its cars to Scuderia Ferrari, which had been founded a few years earlier and had already been using cars from the Biscione manufacturer for some time. However, in 1937 Jano was dismissed from Alfa Romeo because of disagreements with the management, which criticized him for lack of success in races (in these years there was a supremacy of German cars). The engineer defended himself by citing as an excuse the lack of support from management, which Jano considered necessary for the development of his projects. Jano was replaced, at first, by Bruno Trevisan, who, in turn, was replaced in 1936 by Spaniard Wifredo Ricart. Ricart left an indelible mark in the history of Alfa Romeo, since it was his work to introduce the De Dion tube on the brand's cars; this technical peculiarity would later characterize the Milanese automaker's models for decades. On the other hand, as far as Gobbato's administration is concerned, it was fundamental for the brand, which became, under his direction, famous and esteemed all over the world also for its mass-produced cars. The international fame won by Alfa Romeo caused Henry Ford to say, in a conversation that took place in 1939 with Gobbato himself, "when I see an Alfa Romeo go by, I take my hat off." This worldwide fame was consolidated thanks also to the races and drivers who, despite German supremacy, still achieved significant successes. Among those who contributed to writing important pages of Alfa Romeo history in this decade were Giuseppe Campari, Tazio Nuvolari, Achille Varzi, Louis Chiron, and Mario Umberto Baconin Borzacchini.

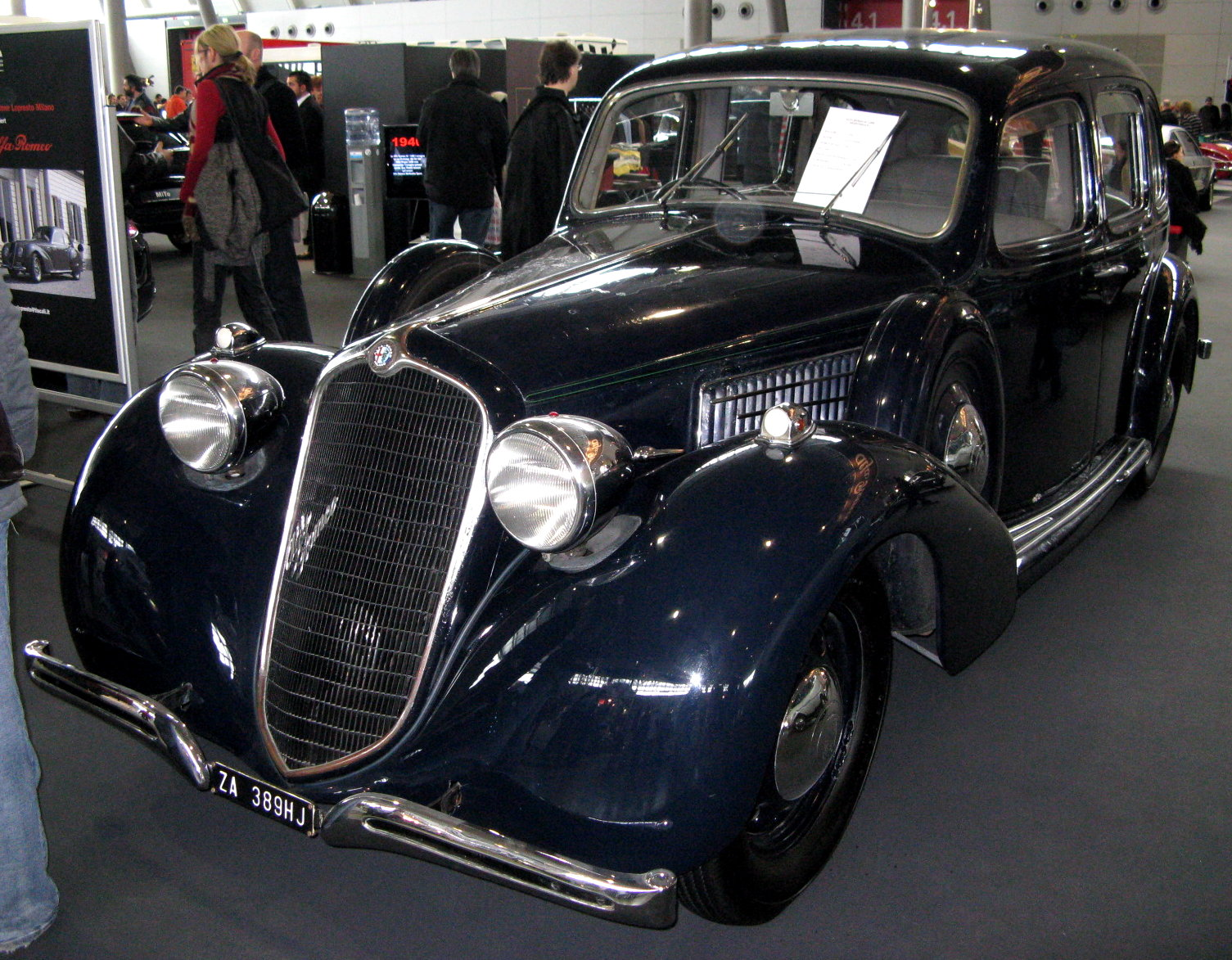
A 1938 Alfa Romeo 6C 2300

In the 1930s there was also the establishment of Alfa Romeo commercial vehicles, which was achieved mainly through their use in the Italian colonies. Such was their popularity and reputation that even in the 21st century in Ethiopia the term romeo generically denotes "truck." The most famous Alfa Romeo truck models were produced in the 1940s, 1950s, and 1960s and were the 430, 900, and Mille. Also in this context, the early 1930s also saw the appearance of the first Alfa Romeo-branded buses and trolley buses which were, in essence, modified trucks. After the 1950s, the Biscione company began to produce these types of vehicles without deriving them from trucks anymore. With the passage of time, Alfa Romeo's tradition in the field of public vehicle assembly was consolidated, making the Biscione company one of the largest Italian manufacturers in this field. Specifically, it produced buses and trolley buses until the 1960s, while it continued to build lighter vehicles such as school buses and minibuses until the 1980s.

This continuation of the strategy of production diversification was also the work of Gobbato, which also focused on the manufacture of aero engines; in this context, in 1938, work began on the construction of a production plant in Pomigliano d'Arco, in the province of Naples, which was to be responsible for the design and assembly of these types of engines. This industrial site was the ancestor of the Fiat group's modern production plant. In this context, in 1941, Alfa Romeo Avio was born, that is, the division that dealt exclusively with aeronautical production. Also in 1938, there was the official return of Alfa Romeo to racing, with the founding of Alfa Corse, that is, a section that was connected to the design, construction and maintenance of racing cars and was managed by Enzo Ferrari. The racing models produced during this period were designed by Gioacchino Colombo and Luigi Bazzi under Ricart. Enzo Ferrari then left Alfa Corse in 1939 because of disagreements that had arisen with other members of the racing department.

Toward the end of the 1930s, however, the political situation in Europe was changing. The winds of war led the various nations, including Italy, toward an arms race. Alfa Romeo's industrial production was oriented toward the assembly of aircraft engines and trucks, which would be most useful to Italy in the event of armed conflict. Thus, the assembly of civilian cars was drastically reduced in favor mainly of aircraft production, which in the years leading up to World War II generated almost 80 percent of Alfa Romeo's sales. Alfa Romeo's tradition in aviation had its roots in the early days of the brand's history. As the decades passed, Alfa Romeo's aero engines became famous for their victorious participation in various attempts to break world records in aviation and for their sporting triumphs, where they demonstrated a certain technical supremacy. The Biscione company's aero engines were thus fitted to a considerable number of aircraft of the Regia Aeronautica, contributing to writing important pages of Italian aviation history. In the field of military engines, many were derived from models, such as the Jupiter, produced under license and characterized by power outputs that, while adequate in the 1930s, with the rapid evolution of technology later proved to be too low for wartime use, while reliability and robustness always remained high. The military engines were almost all radial and air-cooled; an exception was the RA 1000 RC.41 which was a licensed production of the Daimler-Benz DB 601 and equipped the Macchi M.C.202 and Reggiane Re.2001 fighters.

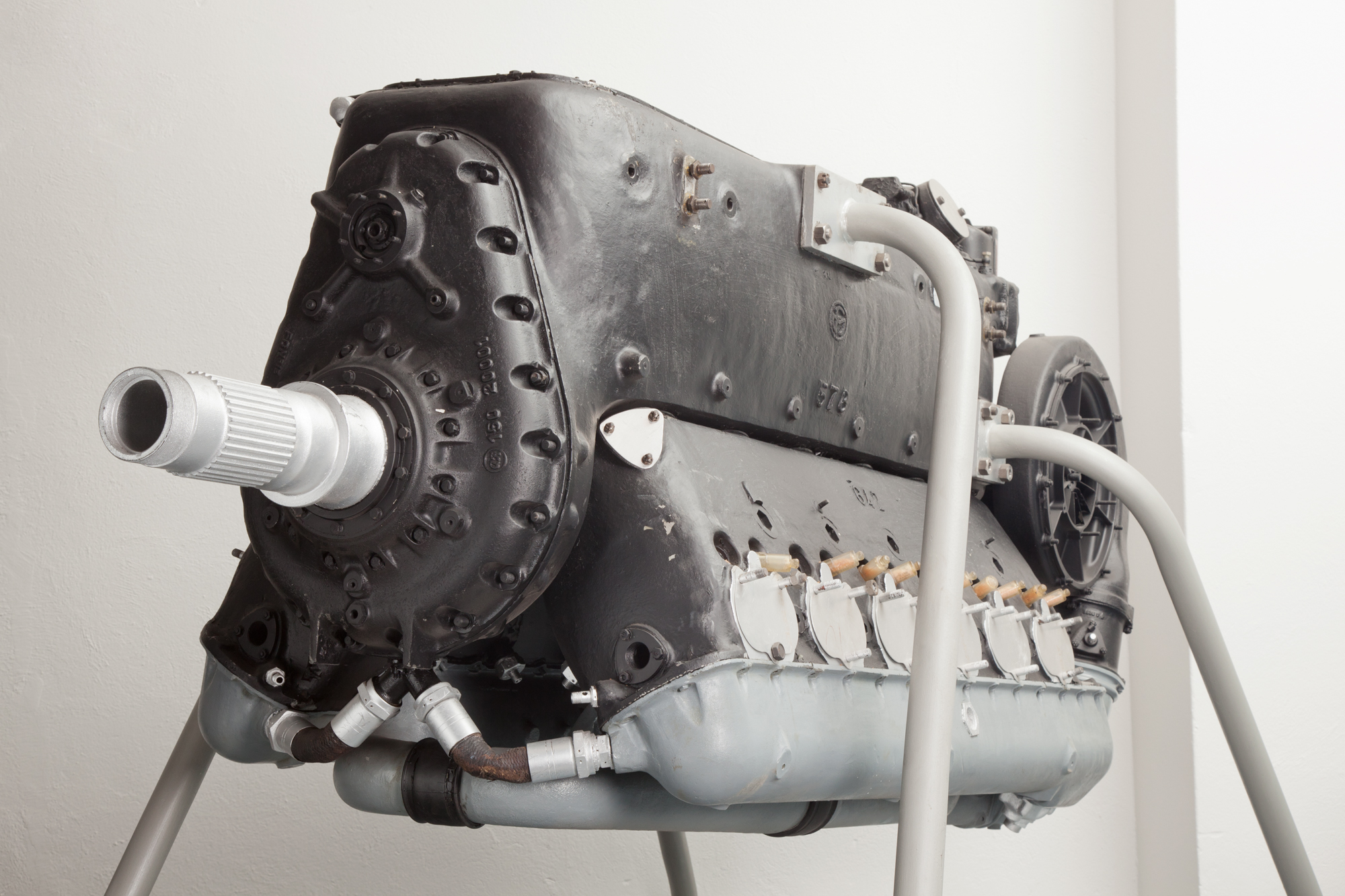
The Alfa Romeo RA1000 aircraft engine preserved at the Leonardo da Vinci National Museum of Science and Technology in Milan, Italy.

In the powerboat field, Alfa Romeo supplied its Lynx aero engine to a hydroplane at the second Pavia-Venice Raid in 1930. Participation in this competition continued in the following years, and in 1938 the company won its first victory with the D2 C.30 powerplant. At the helm was Lieutenant Colonel Goffredo Gorini, a civilian aircraft pilot, who repeated the feat the following year aboard the SIAI-Alfa Romeo hydroplane.

On the other hand, as far as automobile competitions were concerned, the second part of the 1930s saw a supremacy of German cars: the Nazi regime had decided to allocate substantial funds to Auto Union and Mercedes-Benz with the aim of making them more competitive, and thus victorious in competitions. The limited resources that Italy could provide at the time did not allow Alfa Romeo to do the same, responding on the track to German victories. From these years, however, is the creation of the 158, one of the most successful competition cars produced by the company, which, after World War II, would win the inaugural edition of the Formula 1 World Championship. War broke out in 1939, and due to wartime events, Alfa Corse was temporarily closed on February 29, 1940. Italy entered the war in June of the same year.

World War II also left many marks on the Portello plant, which was considered very important for war supplies. Already during the war it was decided to move some of the departments to the Milanese hinterland and to relocate part of the warehouse around Vicenza, to defend these resources from bombing. In addition, Gobbato prepared a plan to conceal the components of the cars, a plan that would prove crucial for the resumption of production activities once the conflict was over. Because of its strategic importance, on February 14 and August 13, 1943, the Milan plant suffered two heavy bombings. The coup de grace came on October 20, 1944, when the most violent bombing that Milan had suffered up to that time caused the demolition of more than 60 percent of the structure, causing the closure of the production site. The Pomigliano d'Arco plant suffered the same fate on May 30, 1943, with the destruction of 70 percent of the operating facilities.

== The 1950s ==
In 1945, with the conflict over, Alfa Romeo found itself in a very difficult situation. The Portello plant had been heavily damaged during the war and there was almost no Italian automobile market. There was also a shortage of raw materials and there was a lack of men who could have handled the situation; Gobbato had been assassinated on April 28, 1945, and Ricart, linked to Francisco Franco, had returned to Spain following the fall of fascism in Italy. The fortunes of Alfa Romeo were again entrusted to Pasquale Gallo, who was appointed extraordinary commissioner by the CNL and later became president, a position he held until 1948.

Since the end of the war, the company tried to put the damaged plants back into operation by initially devoting itself to the construction of electric and gas cookers, metal fixtures, electric motors, buffers for railroad cars, furniture and other manufactured goods. The production strategy set up by Gallo was inspired by the Swiss model of the so-called "organized craftsmanship," in the continuation of the construction of highly elite sports cars, helping itself economically with the production of other manufactured goods even from non-motor sectors, taking advantage of the great elasticity allowed by a craft system, and avoiding mass production, which Gallo believed was destined to succumb against the massive U.S. industry.

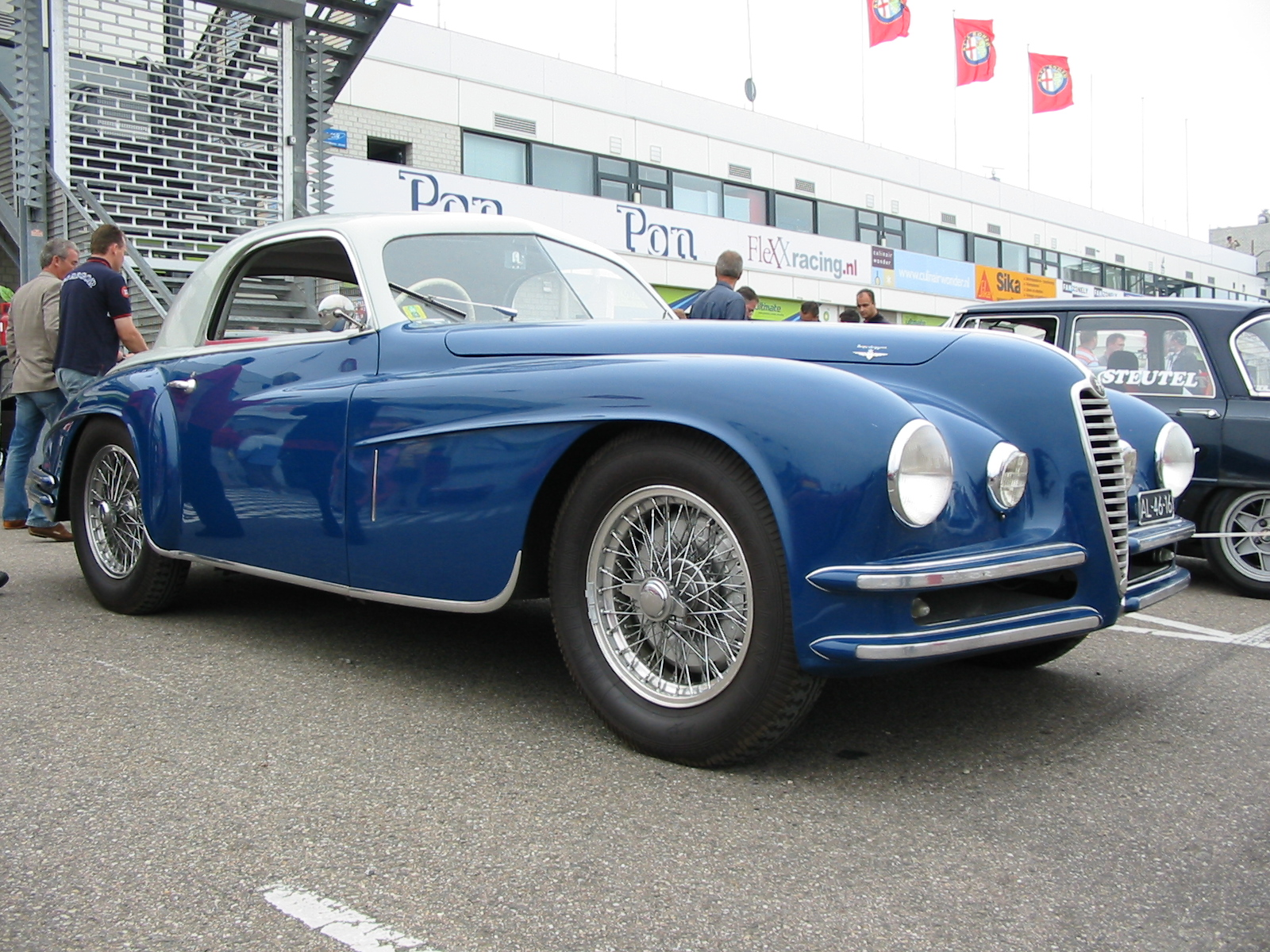
One of the postwar 6C 2500s

As early as the end of 1945, Alfa Romeo returned to traditional automobile production with the production of two examples of a prewar car, the 6C 2500. The following year, due to the great availability of labor and the large stocks in the warehouses of automotive components that had been saved from the bombing, automobile production resumed steadily, again by assembling examples of the 6C 2500. The 6C 2000 "Gazelle," a prototype that had been designed by Ricart during the last years of the war and was equipped with state-of-the-art mechanics (for example, the model anticipated the transaxle transmission that was later fitted thirty years later on the Alfetta), was not put into production.

Alfa Romeo management made this choice because putting a completely new model into production involved a substantial investment of funds. Although the car that returned to production dated back to before the war, the market response was good: due to the growing demand for cars resulting from the first hints of economic recovery, these newly completed examples left the factory destined for buyers. In addition to the market recovery, the abundance of labor also contributed to Alfa Romeo's revival, as it was in the government's interest to reemploy the unemployed in the factories. A special version of the 6C 2500 called the "Golden Arrow" was greatly appreciated by the public and was also purchased by King Farouk I of Egypt, Rita Hayworth and Tyrone Power. In contrast, on the racing front, in 1947 Alfa Romeo won with a 1938 8C 2900B the first edition of the Mille Miglia organized after the end of the war.

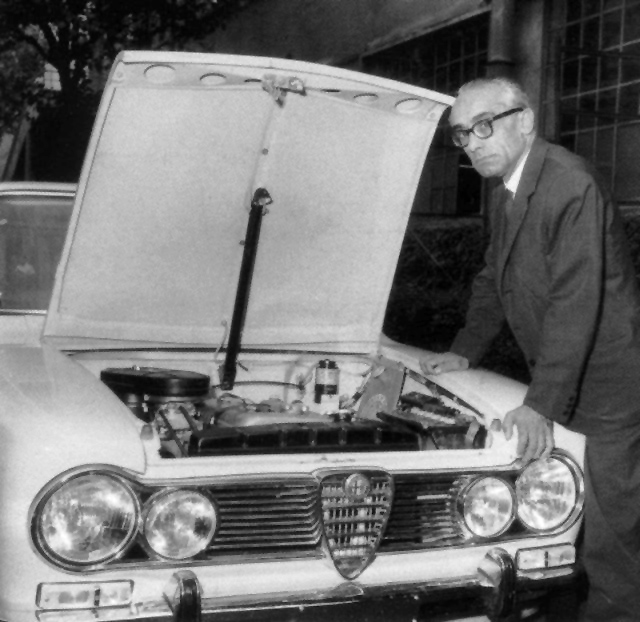
Orazio Satta Puliga

On the managerial front, Orazio Satta Puliga was appointed technical manager in 1946, whose contribution would prove decisive in the relaunch of the brand. Satta Puliga proved his worth in the following years, transforming Alfa Romeo into a car manufacturer producing cars with a wider circulation, at least compared to the models produced until then. Even at this difficult time, as had already happened with Gobbato, Alfa Romeo thus found the right man to solve the problems. These choices were made in collaboration with Giuseppe Luraghi, who was president of Finmeccanica, that is, IRI's lead financial company that owned Alfa Romeo. It was Luraghi who appointed Satta Puliga as technical manager of the Biscione company: the Milanese executive's goal was to relaunch the brand, since he recognized in Alfa Romeo great potential for expansion (Luraghi would later remain with Finmeccanica until 1956). The first measure Satta Puliga took after his appointment as technical manager was to modernize the 6C 2500, at the same time initiating the design phase for the launch of a new model. He also outsourced the production of secondary components to outside companies, thus lowering some of the costs involved in assembling the cars. The new model, which was given the name 1900, debuted in 1950 and was decisive in rescuing the company: in 1949 Finmeccanica was intent on closing it due to low sales of passenger cars and a drastic drop in orders for aircraft engines, which, with the end of the war, were in much less demand on the market. In addition, assiduous participation in competitions involved the use of a lot of funds, so Alfa Romeo's financial situation was not prosperous.

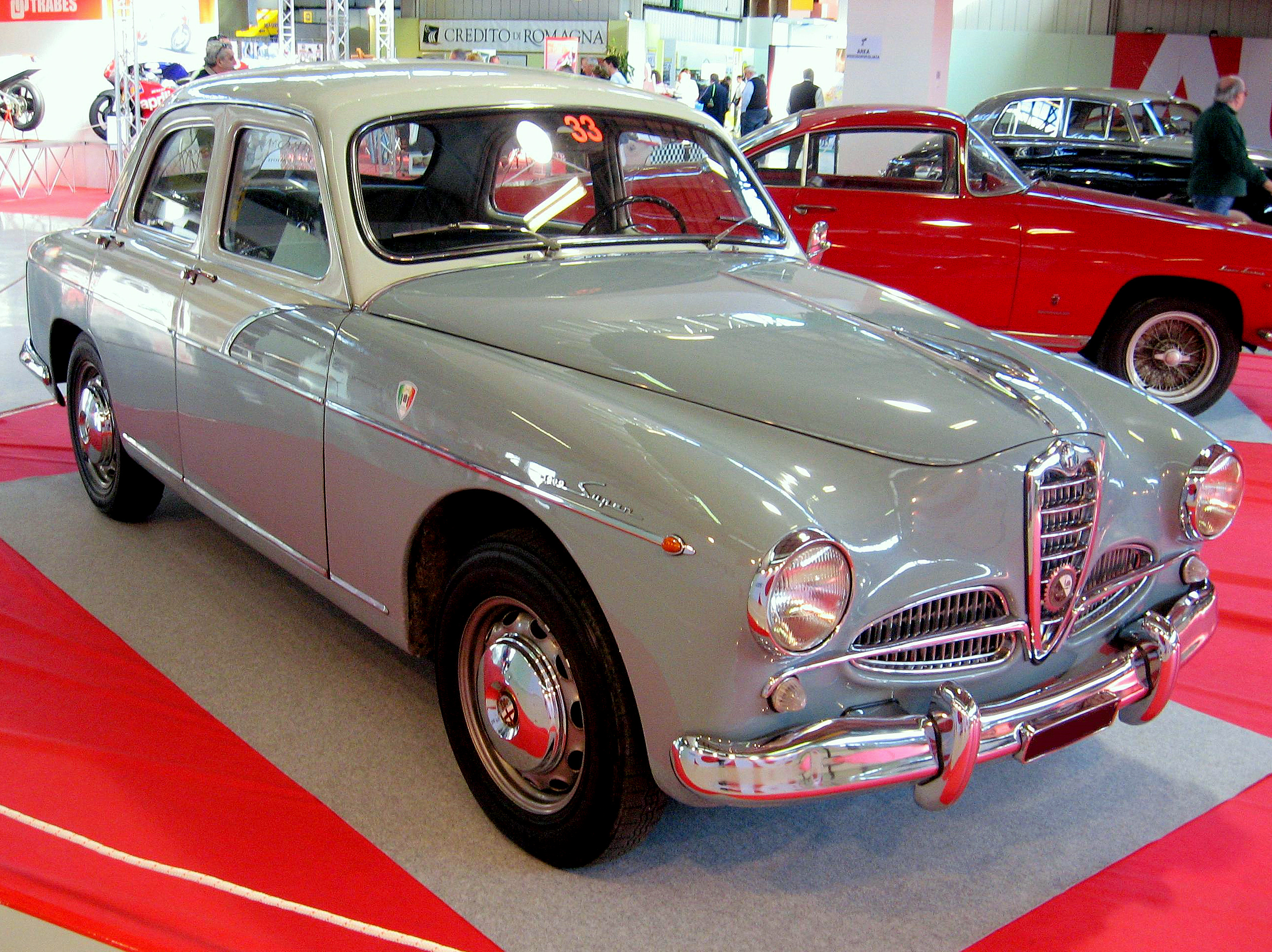
An Alfa Romeo 1900

In developing the design of the 1900, Satta Puliga kept in mind some fundamental principles that would prove crucial to the car's success: reliability, ease of driving, sporty features, and a non-prohibitive price. In particular, drivability was a key aspect in widening the pool of potential customers; a 1900 could be bought and driven even by not very experienced drivers. Production costs, on the other hand, were lowered thanks to the introduction of the assembly line at Portello as well in 1952 (the first 1900s had not been produced on the assembly line). Because of this construction technique, which was also introduced at Alfa Romeo at the behest of Satta Puliga and which was developed with the help of the Marshall Plan, the time needed to assemble a car dropped from 250 to 100 hours, while allowing the high quality standard that was necessary for an Alfa Romeo model to be maintained. The IRI was not able to lavish substantial funds to invest in the carmaker, and therefore aid from the United States was decisive for the relaunch of the brand, which allocated $5 million to the Milanese manufacturer through the Marshall Plan. With the 1900, Alfa Romeo thus went from being a carmaker that assembled luxury models, at an almost artisanal level, to a brand that produced its products industrially, which became within the reach of a greater number of potential buyers thanks to lower production costs. The 1900 also had two other firsts: it was the first Alfa Romeo to have a monocoque structure and to possess left-side steering. All Alfa Romeo cars that followed the 1900, except for a few competition models, would have left-hand drive. The model name was related to the engine's displacement, which was 1,884 cm^{3}, while the mechanicals were derived from Alfa Romeo competition models. The 1900 immediately established itself in the markets, as it was a model with particularly brilliant performance but, at the same time, mass-produced and thus sold at a relatively low price. The new approach immediately bore fruit: thousands of vehicles a year were now coming out of the Portello plant, and this was a record: previously production was at most a thousand cars a year, often without reaching the planned number of units. Growth was steady: from 6,104 cars assembled in 1955, the plant's production capacity reached 57,870 units in 1960.

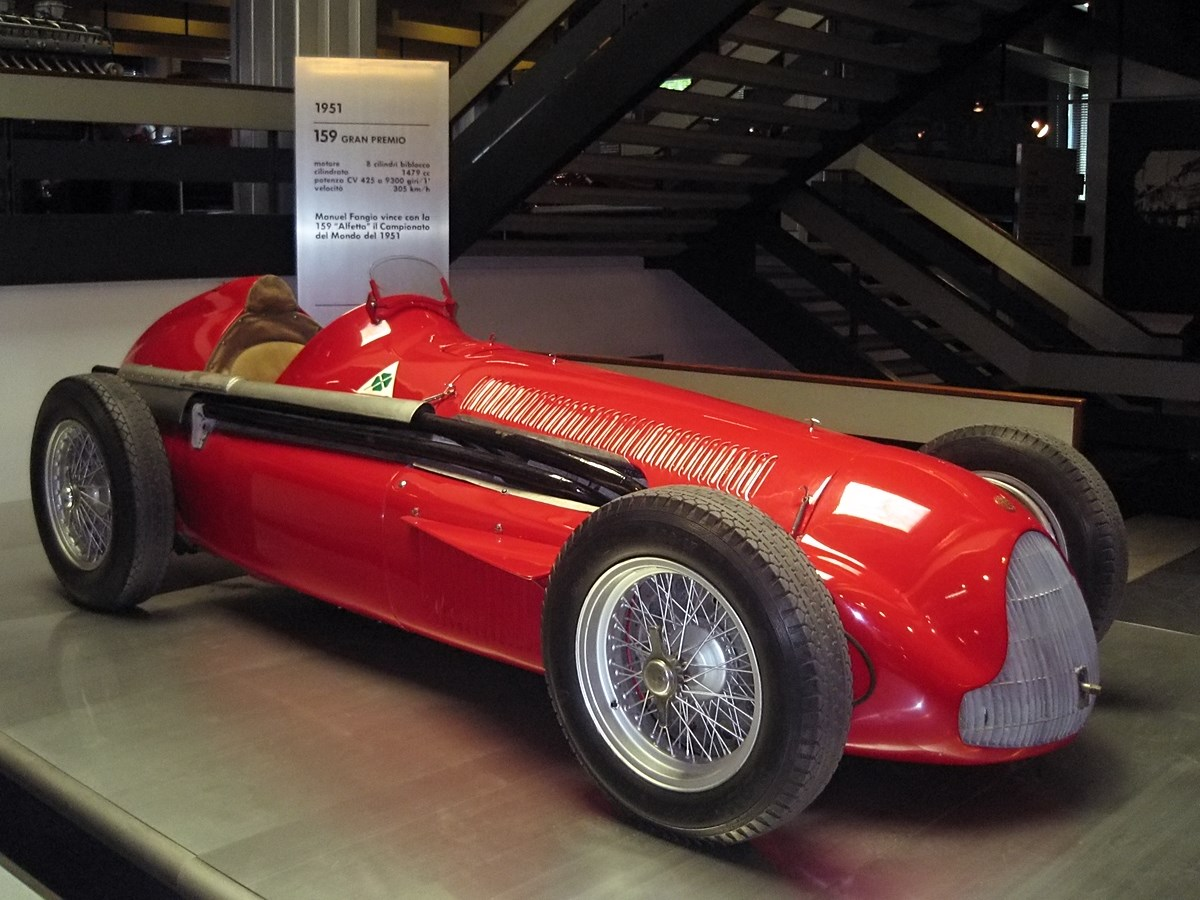
The Alfa Romeo 159 that won the Formula 1 World Championship in 1951

Due to increased production volumes, the 1900 range was later expanded. In 1951 the 1900 Sprint, a coupe equipped with a more powerful engine, was launched, and the following year the 1900 TI sedan was introduced, which was equipped with the same powertrain as the 1900 Sprint and was instead also intended for racing. For these reasons, the motto "the family car that wins races" was chosen as the 1900s advertising slogan. From the 1900 was then derived the so-called "Disco Volante," which was particularly appreciated for its futuristic lines. However, this car was set up in very few examples and never went into series production.

Two important victories in motor racing also came in this context. Two Alfa Romeos won the first two editions of the Formula 1 World Championship, taking the title in the 1950 and 1951 seasons thanks, respectively, to Nino Farina aboard a 158 (nicknamed "Alfetta" because of its small size), and Juan Manuel Fangio, who instead piloted a 159. After these two victories, despite complaints from fans, industry insiders and some of the most prominent political figures, Alfa Romeo temporarily withdrew from Formula 1 because of the high costs that were necessary to continue participation in the championship.

Another model produced during these years was the Matta, i.e., an off-road car that came into being as a result of Alfa Romeo joining an Italian Army tender to supply reconnaissance cars; however, the Italian Armed Forces purchased few examples of this model because of the cost, which was higher than that of the competing car, the Fiat Campagnola. The Matta also did not receive a positive response from the private market. Still in the area of supply to the state, it was instead the 1900 that paved the way for the sale of Alfa Romeo cars to the police: it was the model that inaugurated the famous series of the "Panthers," or cars supplied to the flying squad whose nickname was derived from their black color, aggressive shape and snappy performance. In 1954 the first van built by Alfa Romeo was introduced, the Romeo, which was in production until 1967. Later, the F11/A11 (between 1967 and 1971) and the F12/A12, which was assembled between 1967 and 1983, were produced.

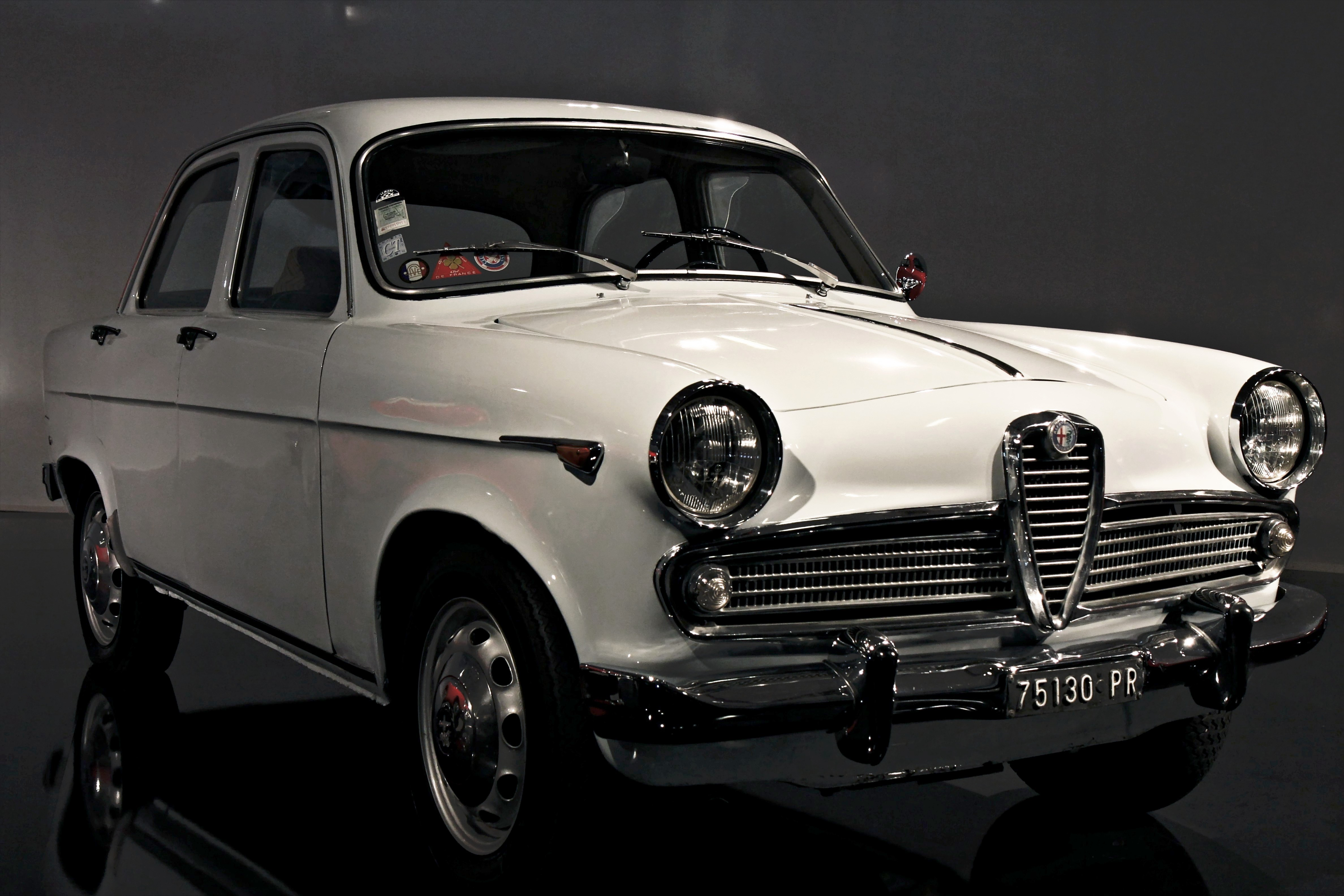
An Alfa Romeo Giulietta

However, the 1900, due to technical issues, was still linked to prewar Alfa Romeos. Due to the excellent sales recorded and the success of the company's change in strategy, which now involved models marketed in relatively high sales volumes, Alfa Romeo decided to design a new model intended this time for the middle class, counting also on the fact that the Italian car market, in the second part of the 1950s, had fully recovered from the postwar economic crisis. In addition, Portello needed a car produced in large volumes that would allow the company's coffers to breathe. Thus the Giulietta was born, that is, a smaller, less expensive and constructively simpler model than the 1900. Italy was in the midst of an economic boom and thus consumption was growing steadily, bringing more and more potential customers into the position of being able to afford a model like the Giulietta, preferring it to the Fiat 1100 or the Lancia Appia. Rudolf Hruska, the Austrian engineer who a few years earlier had designed the Volkswagen Beetle and was hired at Alfa Romeo at Luraghi's behest, also participated in the development of the Giulietta. In the years following the launch, many versions of the Giulietta followed, all of which were fitted with a 1.3 L engine from which Giuseppe Busso, i.e., the designer who developed the mechanics of Alfa Romeo models starting with the 1900, was able to obtain up to 90 hp of power. It was therefore decided not to use the more common 1.1 L engine so as not to upset Fiat, which in fact dominated this market segment with the 1100. However, the Giulietta remained an unattainable desire for the vast majority of Italians, who could not afford it; despite this, the model was an unprecedented success for an Alfa Romeo model and earned the nickname "Italy's sweetheart." With the Giulietta, the term "alfista" was born, which would henceforth define fans of the Milanese brand.

The Giulietta was followed in 1958 by the unsuccessful 2000, which did not reach the hoped-for market share due to competition from the more successful Lancia Flaminia, the backwardness of its mechanics and its too high price. In 1959, Alfa Romeo instead introduced the Dauphine, a small car produced under Renault license that was launched in the markets to saturate the production lines at the Portello plant. Since the small car market segment in Italy was controlled almost absolutely by Fiat, Alfa Romeo's management decided not to invest resources in the development of a completely new model, but to rely on another car brand that had more experience on this type of car. However, the Dauphine was not as successful as hoped. Nevertheless, with the launch of the 1900 and Giulietta, Alfa Romeo's sales from 1951 to 1957 increased by 187 percent, which ensured the salvation of the brand.

== The 1960s ==
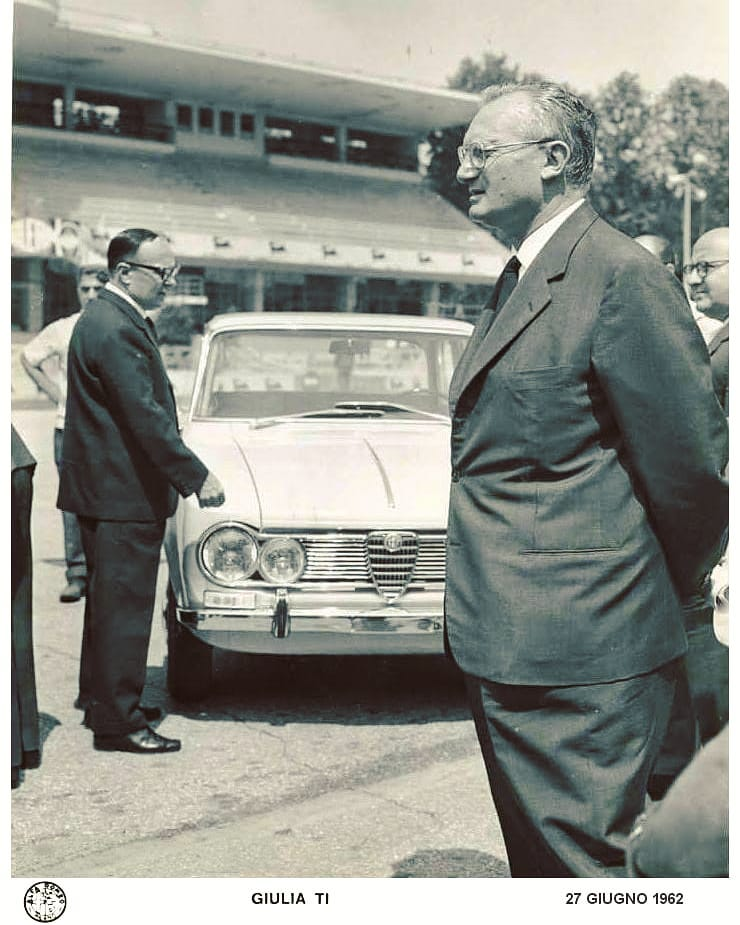
Giuseppe Luraghi

In the early 1960s the 2600 was introduced, which marked the return to models with large displacement engines. An evolution of the 2000, it was the last Alfa Romeo with a twin-shaft inline-six engine. In this context, the management of the Milanese car manufacturer decided to give priority to the design of the successor model of the Giulietta, which, in the meantime, had reached the one hundred thousandth model produced (this milestone, reached in 1961, was celebrated in the presence of actress Giulietta Masina). The need for the new model was becoming more and more pressing, since one of the fastest-growing sectors, due to increasing affluence at all levels, was that of medium-sized cars; moreover, competition in this market had become fierce, with customers demanding increasingly powerful and high-performing models. On the managerial front, Luraghi became president in 1960 and thus returned to the Biscione carmaker after a stint at Lanerossi.

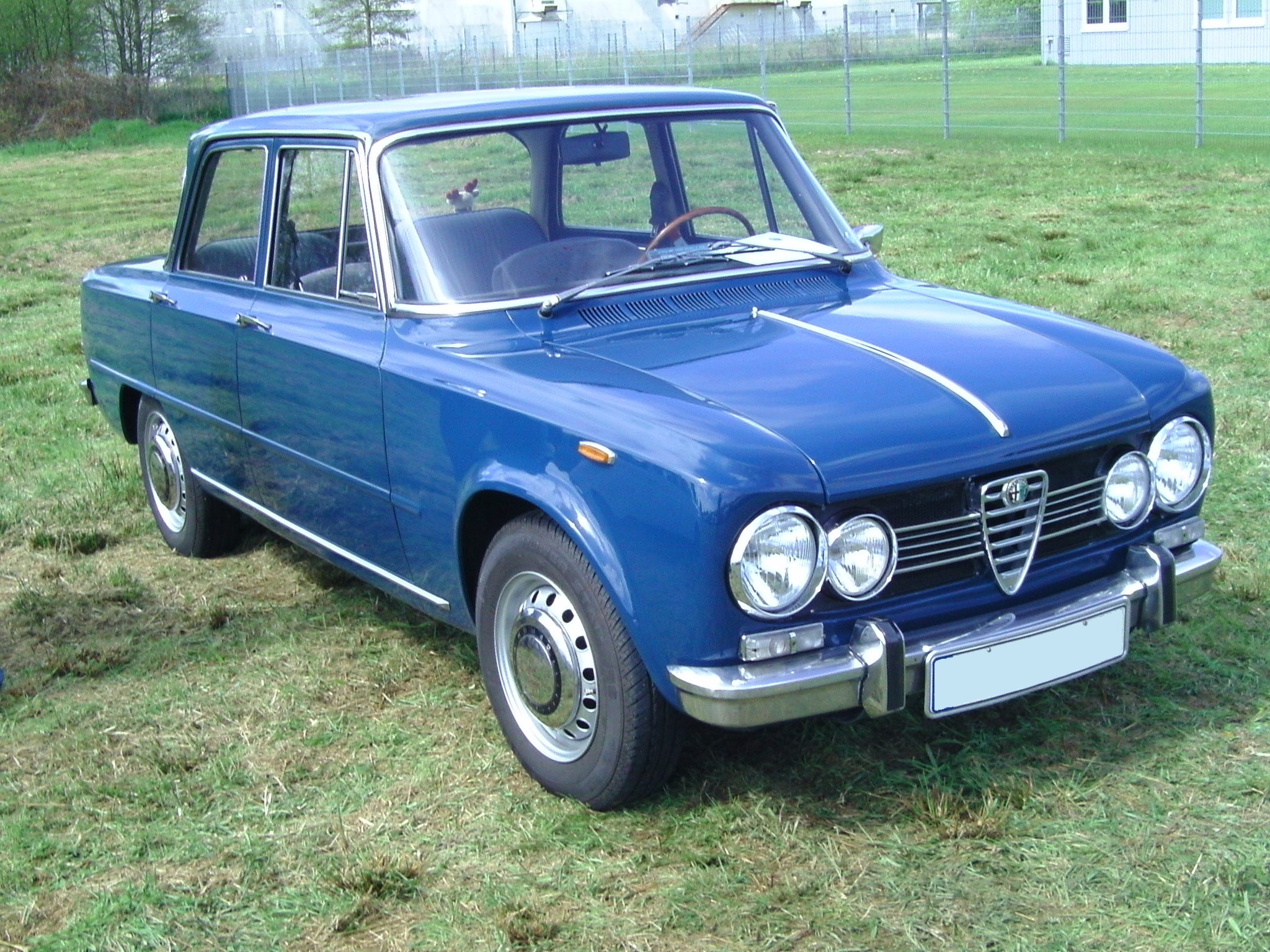
An Alfa Romeo Giulia

In the meantime, the production capacity of the Portello plant was reaching saturation point, so an expansion of the industrial infrastructure became necessary. However, the Portello factory was gradually becoming part of Milan's urban fabric due to the city's urban sprawl, so Alfa Romeo's management decided to open a new plant on the outskirts of Milan that would not have the problems of the urban site: the expansion of Milan's urban center meant that the factory could not be enlarged. The official decision to open a new production site was made on February 27, 1959, when the board of directors decreed the purchase of a large vacant area just outside Milan, between the towns of Arese and Garbagnate Milanese. However, the construction phases of the Arese plant, strongly desired by Luraghi, were protracted longer than planned due to problems related to procurement, so the inauguration of the structure was postponed to 1963. For this reason, assembly of the Giulietta's successor model was initially planned at the Portello, with the intention of transferring production to Arese when the new plant was completed. The inauguration of the Centro Sperimentale di Balocco (Balocco Experimental Center), i.e., a track intended for testing cars that reproduced the most famous and challenging curves of the motor racing circuits of the time, also took place during these years.

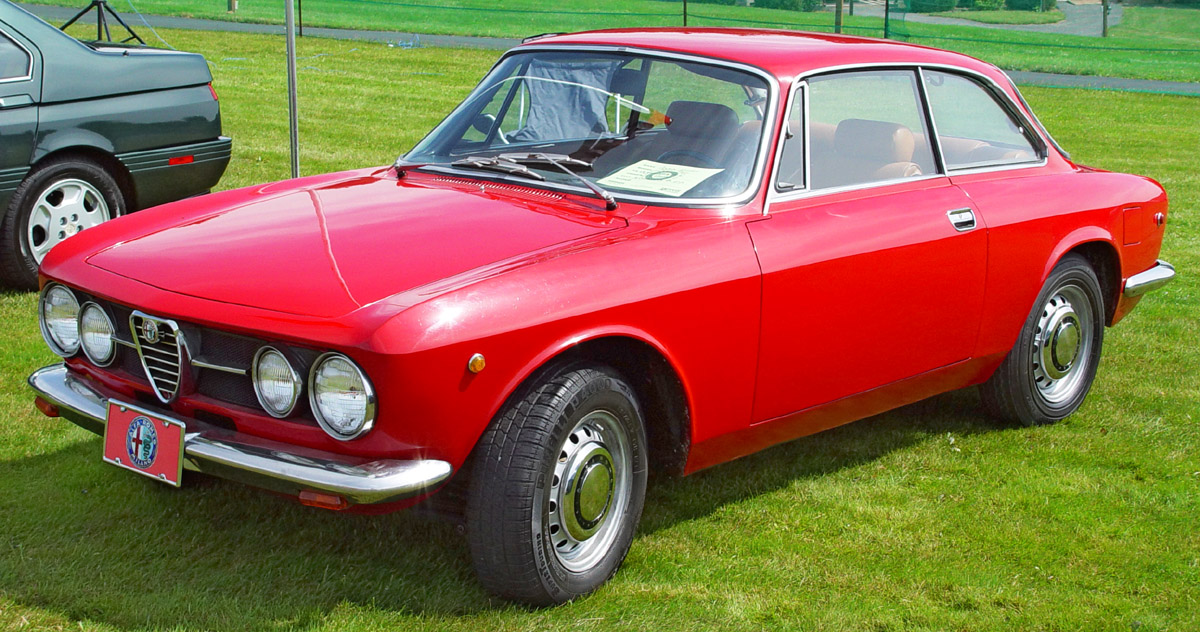
A 1969 Alfa Romeo 1750 GT Veloce

Meanwhile, the design of the model that would replace the Giulietta went ahead with the intention of making a market launch before the predecessor car went out of production. The first version of the Giulia was introduced to the markets in June 1962. Already from the name, its place in the markets was understood. Slightly larger than the Giulietta, it was placed in a slightly higher range: while the Giulietta was competing with models having a displacement of about 1300 cm^{3}, the Giulia was placed in the market range of cars that possessed a 1600 cm^{3} engine. The similarity between the two models did not lie only in the name, however, as the Giulia inherited the type of engines previously fitted on the 1900 and Giulietta. What changed was the line, which was completely redesigned at the behest of Satta Puliga. The result was a very distinctive body, which did not resemble that of any other contemporary car and which possessed, due to the use of the wind tunnel, a particularly aerodynamic shape. The slogan "the Giulia, a car designed by the wind" was coined for its very low Cx. Alfa Romeo's new 1.6 L twin-shaft engine, which debuted on the model, allowed the Giulia to rank first in the performance-based ranking of European sedans. In the following years many variants of the Giulia were launched on the market, which also completed the range with distinctly sporty versions such as the Giulia GT (later marketed simply as "GT"). Due to the prosperity that was beginning to spread in Italy following the economic boom, an increasing number of Italians could afford an Alfa Romeo. The Giulia, also due to the 1.3 L engine that had joined the aforementioned 1.6 L powerplant, was the emblem of this period. The Giulia with the 1.3 L engine was the preserve of the upper-middle class, while the models with the 1.6 L powerplant were generally purchased by more affluent customers.

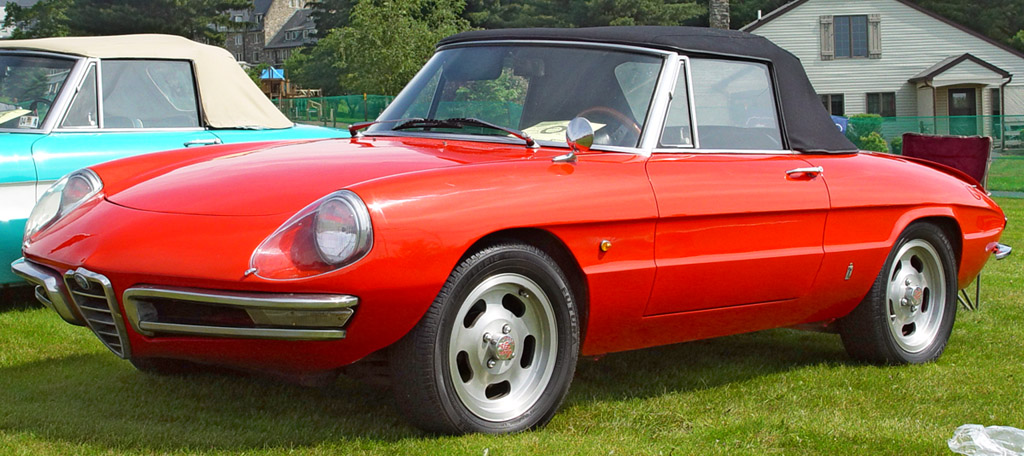
An Alfa Romeo Spider

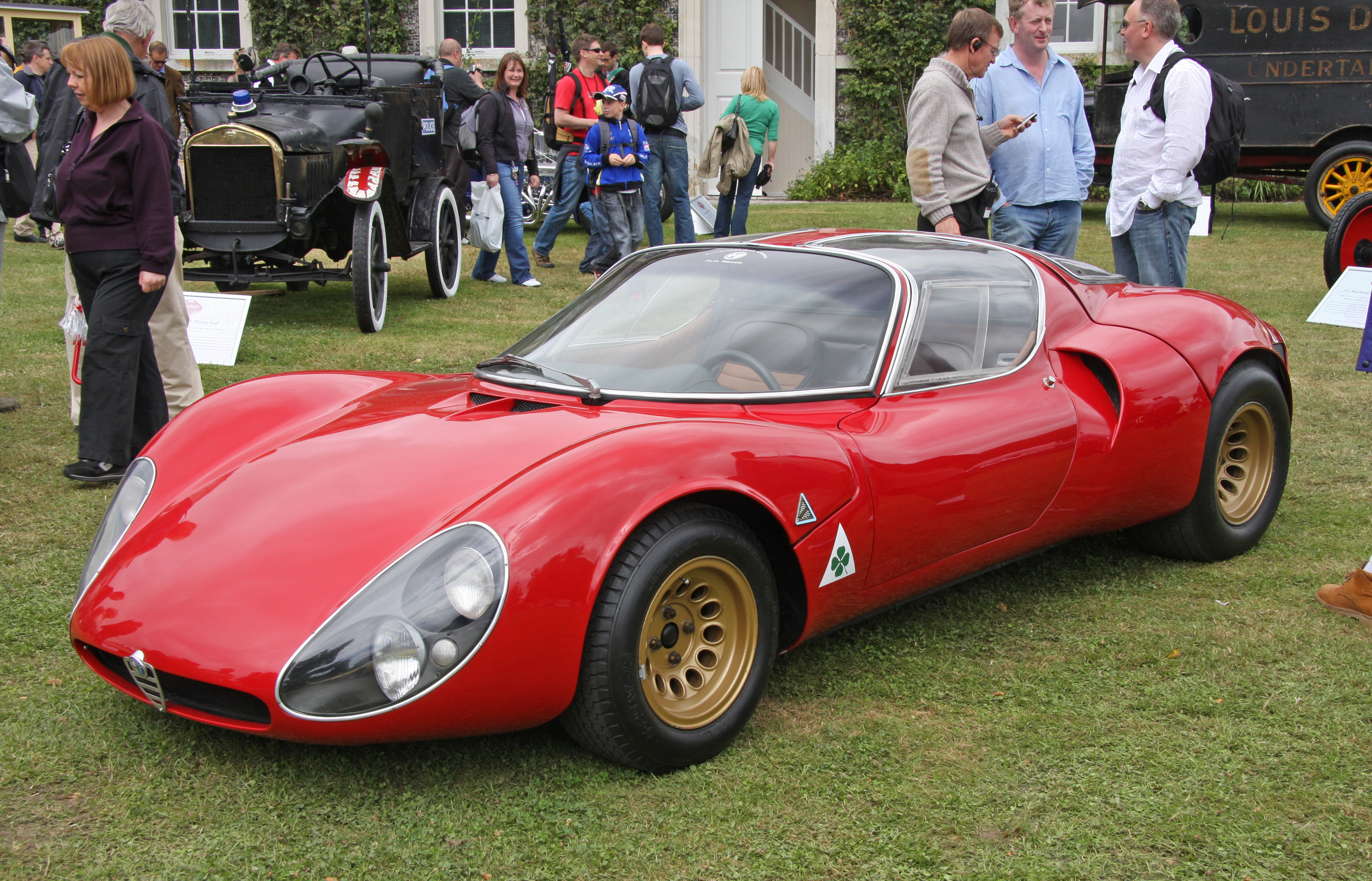
An Alfa Romeo 33 Stradale

To complete the range, Alfa Romeo then decided to launch on the markets also a spyder model with high performance that would succeed the Giulia Spider whose line, in turn, was derived from that of the Giulietta Spider. The design of the line of the new car was entrusted to Pininfarina, which had also designed, among other things, the bodywork of its two ancestors. The model to be mass-produced debuted in March 1966 under the name "1600 Spider." It was designed by Pininfarina. Soon after, however, it was decided to associate the car with a nickname that would enter the collective imagination, and so a competition was announced by Quattroruote magazine where readers could suggest the name; a Brescian engineer, Guidobaldo Trionfi, won, who had proposed the name "Duetto," recalling the fact that the model had two seats. As early as 1966 that nickname was officially attached to the 1600 Spider, but it could only be used for a short time because of homonymy with a chocolate snack sold at the time. The confectionery company that produced it claimed the exclusive right to commercial use of the name "Duetto," and thus the Milanese automaker was forced to change the model's name to "Alfa Romeo Spider"; however, despite this dispute, the model is universally known as the "Duetto." The Duetto's floorpan was derived from that of the Giulia, and it was Battista Farina's last work before his death. The Duetto was a huge success that crossed national borders reaching as far as the United States, where it was also very popular due to its appearance in the film The Graduate (1967; this film was Dustin Hoffman's first starring role). During these years Alfa Romeo, which was at the height of its fame, introduced another model that went down in history, the 33 Stradale. Derived from the Tipo 33 competition model, the 33 Stradale was produced in a very small number of examples. The project from which the Tipo 33 was born, that is, the progenitor of many competition models that raced until the 1970s, was Luraghi's idea.

In 1963, again at Luraghi's behest and through the efforts of Carlo Chiti, Autodelta was established, which the following year became the racing section of Alfa Romeo. This external racing department was desired by Luraghi to provide Alfa Romeo with a streamlined and independent structure that would relieve the parent company of the conspicuous work associated with racing. In 1966 Alfa Romeo acquired Autodelta, which then became the new official racing department of the company, replacing the in-house one. One of the models prepared by Autodelta during this period, the Giulia GTA, won six European Touring Car Championships between the 1960s and 1970s.

At the time, Alfa Romeo's dominance in the medium-large car category was unchallenged, so the Milanese automaker decided to design a model that would replace the unsuccessful 2600 by placing itself in the large car bracket. This time they opted for a smaller and less expensive model, using the Giulia as a base to limit design costs. Thus was born, in 1967, the 1750. However, the new car, which pleased the market, was also the first "victim" of the "Hot Autumn" since, due to labor unrest, production slowdowns and sabotage incidents were recorded starting in 1969.

== The 1970s ==
The 1960s and 1970s were characterized by the collaboration between Alfa Romeo and the leading Italian designers; for example, Zagato, who designed the lines of many of the brand's coupes, Pininfarina, to whom the Duetto is owed, and Bertone, who designed, among other things, the 1970 Montreal, a model that was not as successful as hoped because it was launched on the markets just before the 1973 oil crisis and thus suffered from the high fuel consumption of its 2.5 l V8 engine, worked for the Biscione company. On the other hand, in 1971 the 2000 was developed from the 1750.

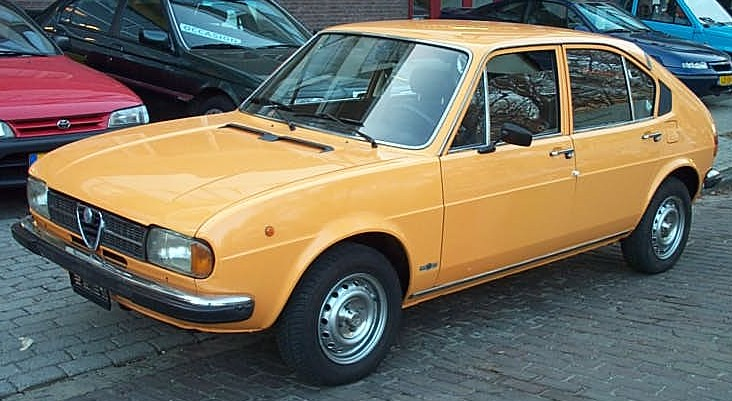
An Alfa Romeo Alfasud

On the corporate strategy front, a decision was made as early as the late 1960s to remake the Pomigliano d'Arco plant, which included its transformation from an aircraft engine production center to a full-fledged automotive plant. However, the plan to assemble a small model in southern Italy dated back to the 1950s even though, due to various vicissitudes, it was not made operational until the 1970s. One of the reasons that prompted Luraghi to invest in southern Italy was an attempt to limit southern emigration to factories in the north, thus bringing work to the areas where it originated. This, according to Luraghi, would limit the emergence of the social and integration problems that arose from the massive exodus of migrants to northern regions.

The first car to be produced in Pomigliano d'Arco was the Alfasud, that is, a medium-small model that marked the Biscione company's debut in this segment and was assembled starting in 1972. The Alfasud was equipped with a bodywork that was born from the pencil of Giorgetto Giugiaro and a small 1.2 l engine that, however, did not detract from the model's performance due to its size. The model had two firsts: it was the first Alfa Romeo with front-wheel drive and the first model from the manufacturer to have installed the Alfa Romeo Boxer engine. Already at the time of its launch, the Alfasud was commercially successful, partly due to the downward expansion of the potential customer base. The latter now included possible buyers who previously would never have been able to afford a new Alfa Romeo model. Since production was now carried out not only in the province of Milan but also in Campania, the Alfa Romeo brand had its reference to the Milanese capital removed.

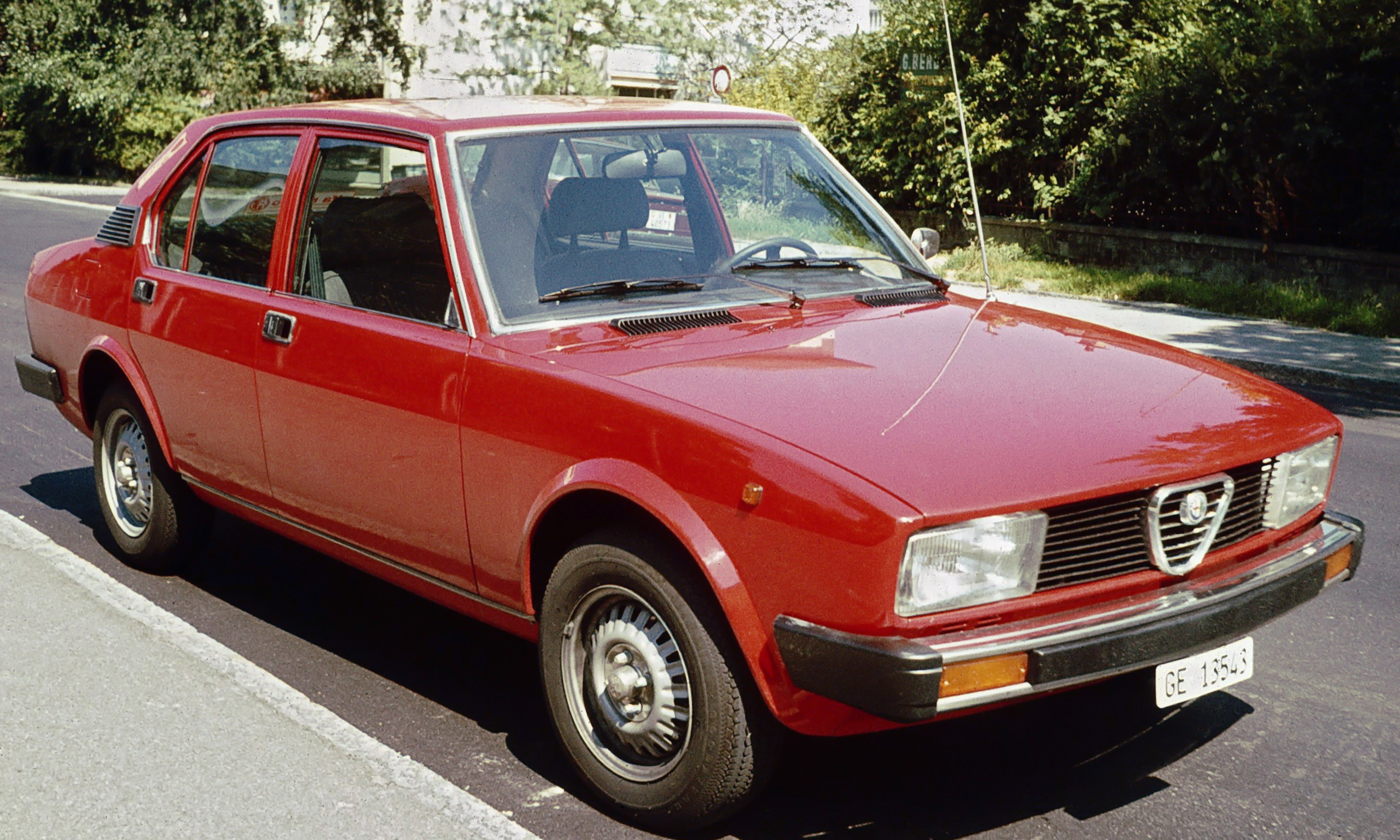
An Alfa Romeo Alfetta

The Alfasud, also in 1972, was joined by a new model, the Alfetta, i.e., a mid to high-end sedan that was placed – in the Alfa Romeo range – between the Giulia and the 2000. The Alfetta was powered by the 1.8-liter version of Alfa Romeo's twin-shaft engine that had made its debut in 1968 on the 1750. The Alfetta featured completely new mechanicals that were developed to modernize the transmission, suspension, and chassis, whose schemes dated back to the 1900 and had become obsolete, especially in light of the technological advances made by competitors. The name of the new car was derived from the nickname of the racing model that had won the first Formula 1 world championship, the 158. The choice of the name was not accidental, nor was it dictated by tradition: the new mechanicals were derived from the competition cars and included a chassis with double wishbone front suspension and a De Dion rear axle. The transmission followed the transaxle scheme, with the gearbox and clutch mounted in bulk in the rear axle to achieve perfect weight distribution. Specifically, the De Dion tube solution was derived from the competition cars of the 1950s and was installed because it allowed the wheels to move independently without having unfavorable camber deviations, resulting in improved road holding. Because of these technical innovations, the Alfetta initially raised some doubts among some Alfa Romeo executives, who feared a negative response from the market accustomed to Alfa Romeo's classic and proven mechanics: the reaction of potential buyers to such a radical change could not be predicted with certainty. From a mechanical point of view, however, the Alfetta was ahead of its time, and no other competitor model possessed such a refined scheme. Nevertheless, the new model had one major flaw: it possessed some assembly problems.

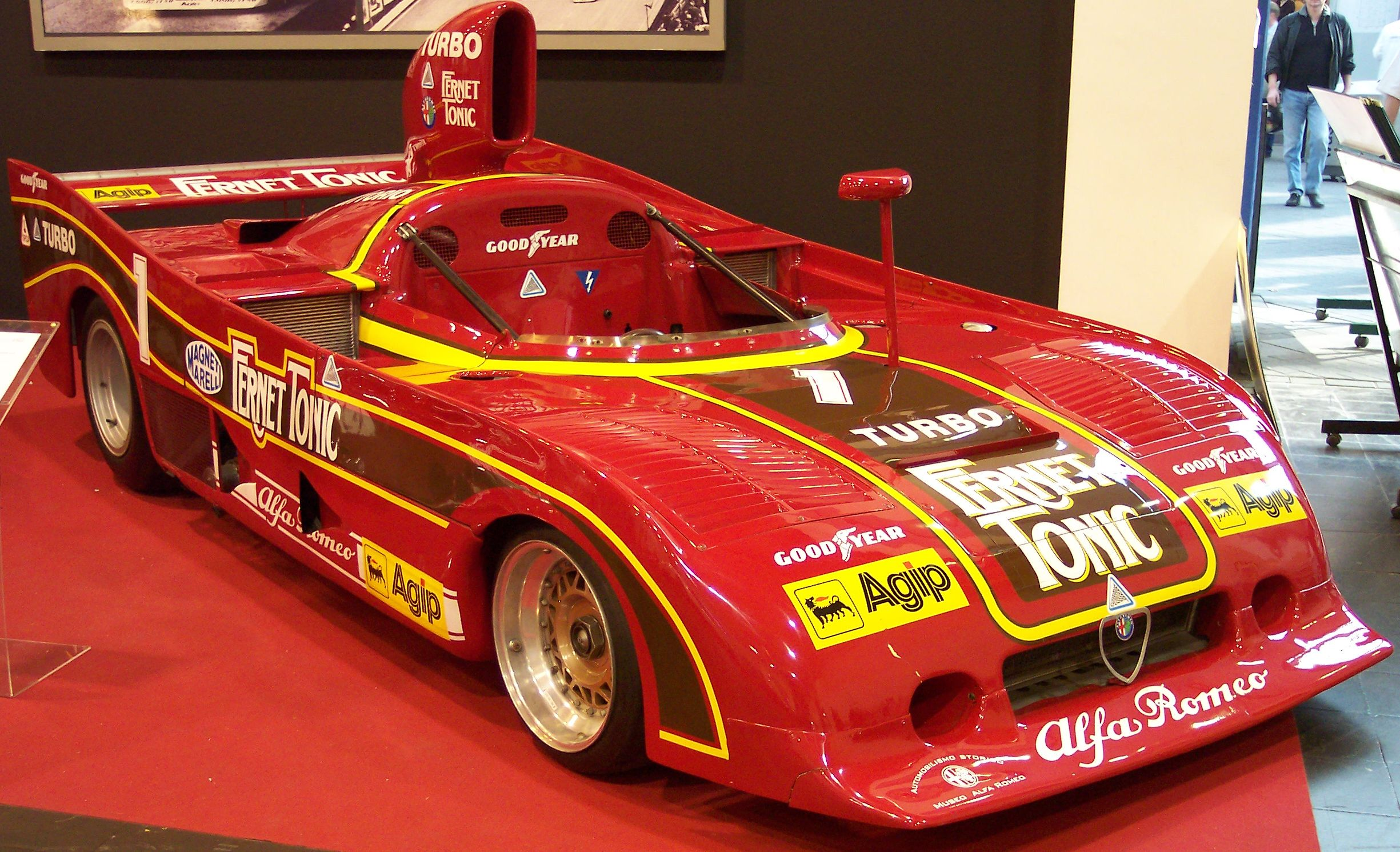
The Alfa Romeo 33 SC 12 that won the World Sportscar Championship in 1977 with Arturo Merzario, Vittorio Brambilla and Jean-Pierre Jarier

As for racing, the 1970s saw Alfa Romeo engaged mainly in racing with "covered-wheel" cars, particularly with the Tipo 33 and its derivatives, which won in two editions of the World Sportscar Championship (1975 and 1977). In the 1977 edition Alfa Romeo won all the races on the calendar in its own category, while in the 1975 edition it won the overall ranking. The drivers responsible for these successes were Arturo Merzario, Jacques Laffite, Jochen Mass, Derek Bell, Nino Vaccarella, Jean-Pierre Jarier, Vittorio Brambilla and Henri Pescarolo.

Despite the racing victories, the 1970s were not as fortunate with regard to mass production, mainly due to the 1973 oil crisis that severely affected the auto industry. Sales of passenger cars fell conspicuously due to the rapid and steep rise in fuel prices. On the managerial front, Luraghi left Alfa Romeo in 1974 following the clash that occurred with IRI and CIPE executives over the possible construction of a fourth Alfa Romeo plant in Irpinia, Ciriaco De Mita's constituency. The goal was to produce the Alfetta there with the simultaneous downsizing of the Arese plant. Luraghi considered the proposal to open a second plant in the South uneconomical, especially in light of the difficulties that arose due to the energy crisis, preferring, on the contrary, the upgrading of the Arese production site. This fourth Alfa Romeo plant was then built in Pratola Serra in 1981 for the assembly of the Arna. Since 1996, engines for the Fiat group have been produced there.

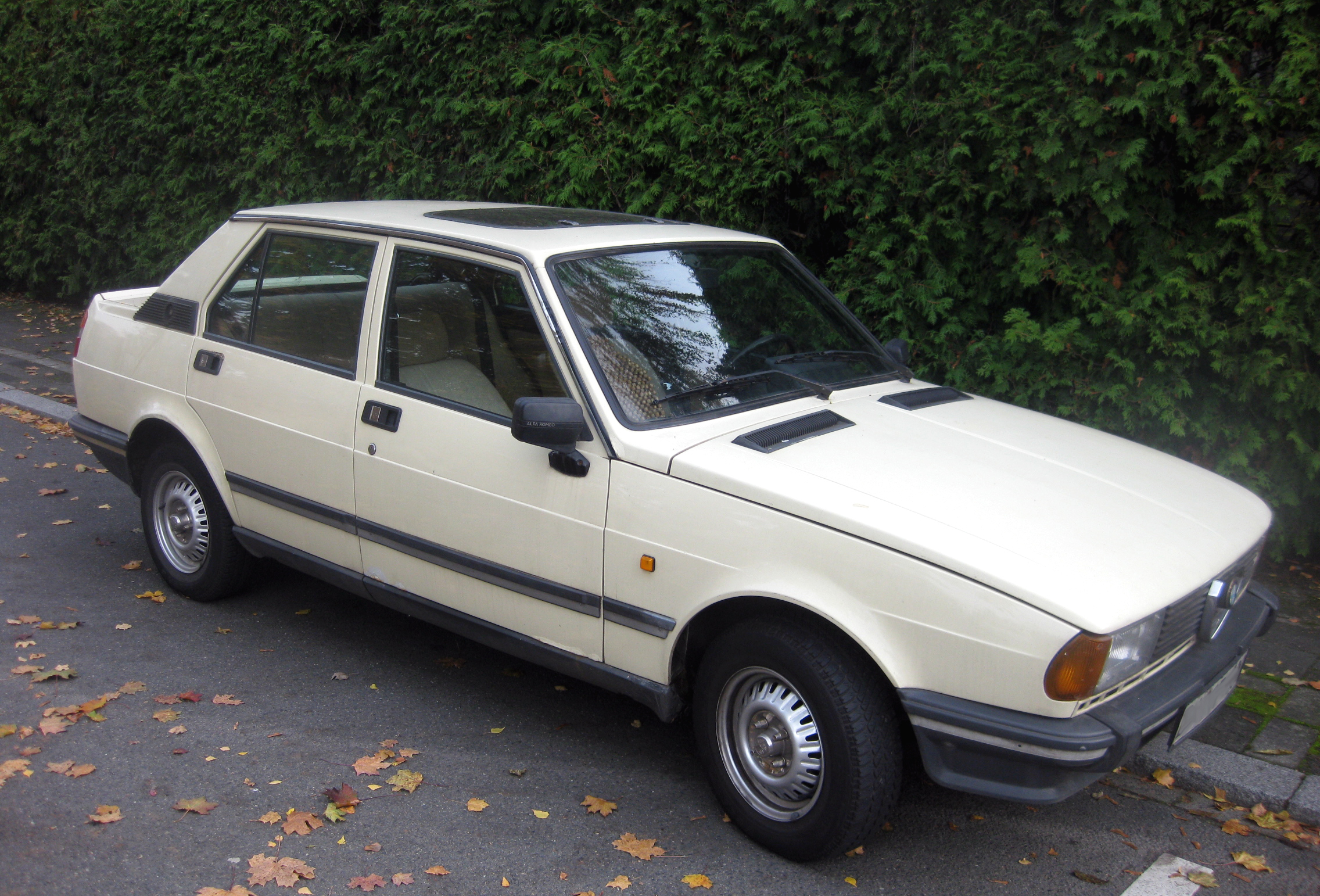
An Alfa Romeo Giulietta

As for road models, the second part of the 1970s was marked by the start of a phase of serious difficulties that resulted in a substantial passivity towards updating older models and launching new cars. The Giulia, which had already been obsolete for years, was replaced only in 1977 by the new Giulietta, which took the mechanicals from the Alfetta but positioned itself in a lower market segment since it was offered with two smaller engines, 1300 and 1600 cm^{3}. However, the bodywork was completely different from that of the Giulia, as it featured squarish lines. At the same time, the Alfetta with a 2-liter engine was introduced, whose debut followed the version with a 1.6-liter engine by a few years.

A little later, and after a long gestation, the new flagship was introduced, which was given the name Alfa 6 (1979). Although it was equipped with the V6 Busso engine, i.e., Alfa Romeo's first six-cylinder engine since the one installed on the 2600, the Alfa 6 proved to be a commercial flop due to its obsolete styling, the economic climate of those years that discouraged the purchase of large cars, and the growing antagonism of BMW and Mercedes-Benz models. The same year saw the debut of the first Italian car with a supercharged diesel engine, the Alfetta Turbodiesel; it was successful mainly due to its performance, which placed it in the top positions of the rankings drawn up based on the performance of cars with this type of fuel. The achievement soothed the failure of the first Alfa Romeo Diesel, a Giulia to which the Alfa Romeo F12 van powerplant had been fitted in 1976.

In the late 1970s, Alfa Romeo returned to Formula 1 racing. The prelude dated back to the previous decade, when the Biscione company had supplied the powerplant to minor racing teams, and to the early part of the 1970s, when Alfa Romeo engines had been fitted, from 1970 to 1971, to McLaren and March cars. With the intention of gaining experience in Grand Prix while preparing for direct participation as a manufacturer, Alfa Romeo entered into an agreement with Brabham in 1975, again for the supply of engines. Alfa Romeo then took part in the Formula 1 championship as a constructor from 1979 to 1985, but without achieving great success. This return to Formula 1 was overshadowed by the death of driver Patrick Depailler, who crashed, during some tests in Germany in 1980, in his Alfa Romeo.

== The 1980s ==
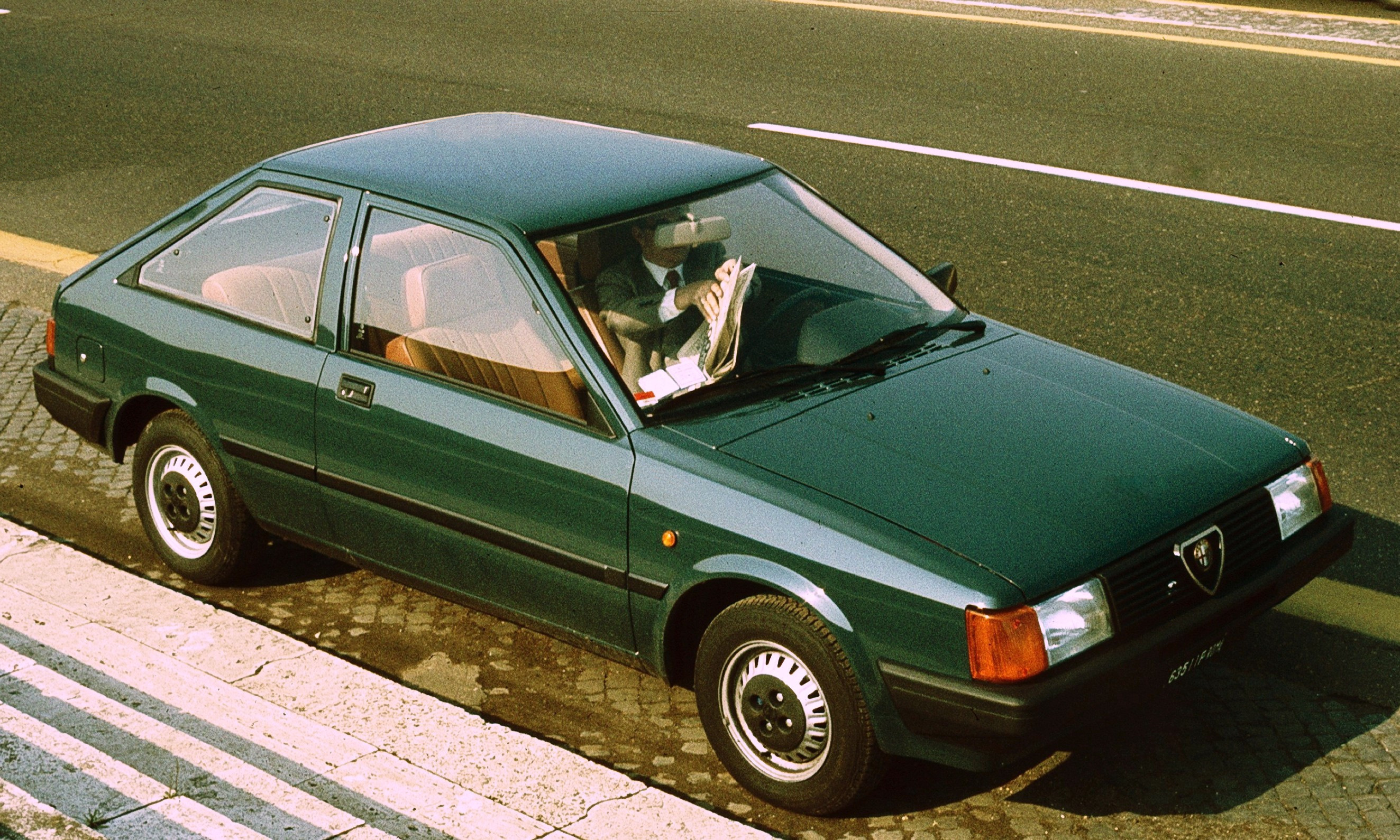
An Alfa Romeo Arna

The period from the late 1970s to the early 1980s was characterized by the presence in the Alfa Romeo range of obsolete and outdated models that were not replaced by new cars that lived up to the prestige of the brand. The workmanship of the models was also deficient, lacking in poor assembly and poor quality of materials. The latter, in particular, also led to rust problems with the car body, which caused, among other things, the brand's image to deteriorate, especially in the international arena. In the meantime, the energy crisis was mitigating its inhibiting effects towards the economy, and this also led – among other consequences – to stronger competition from foreign automakers. Therefore, Alfa Romeo went from a situation characterized by the presence of only one main competitor – Lancia – to a new condition that was marked by the presence of strong and growing competition from the models of foreign brands, which had benefited from the internationalization of markets that had taken place during the energy crisis[177]. In this unfavorable context, Alfa Romeo's situation deteriorated further. The first measure that was taken by Alfa Romeo's management to cope with the situation was to carry out a restyling of the entire range in the early 1980s. This update, as a result, did not bring the hoped-for benefits.

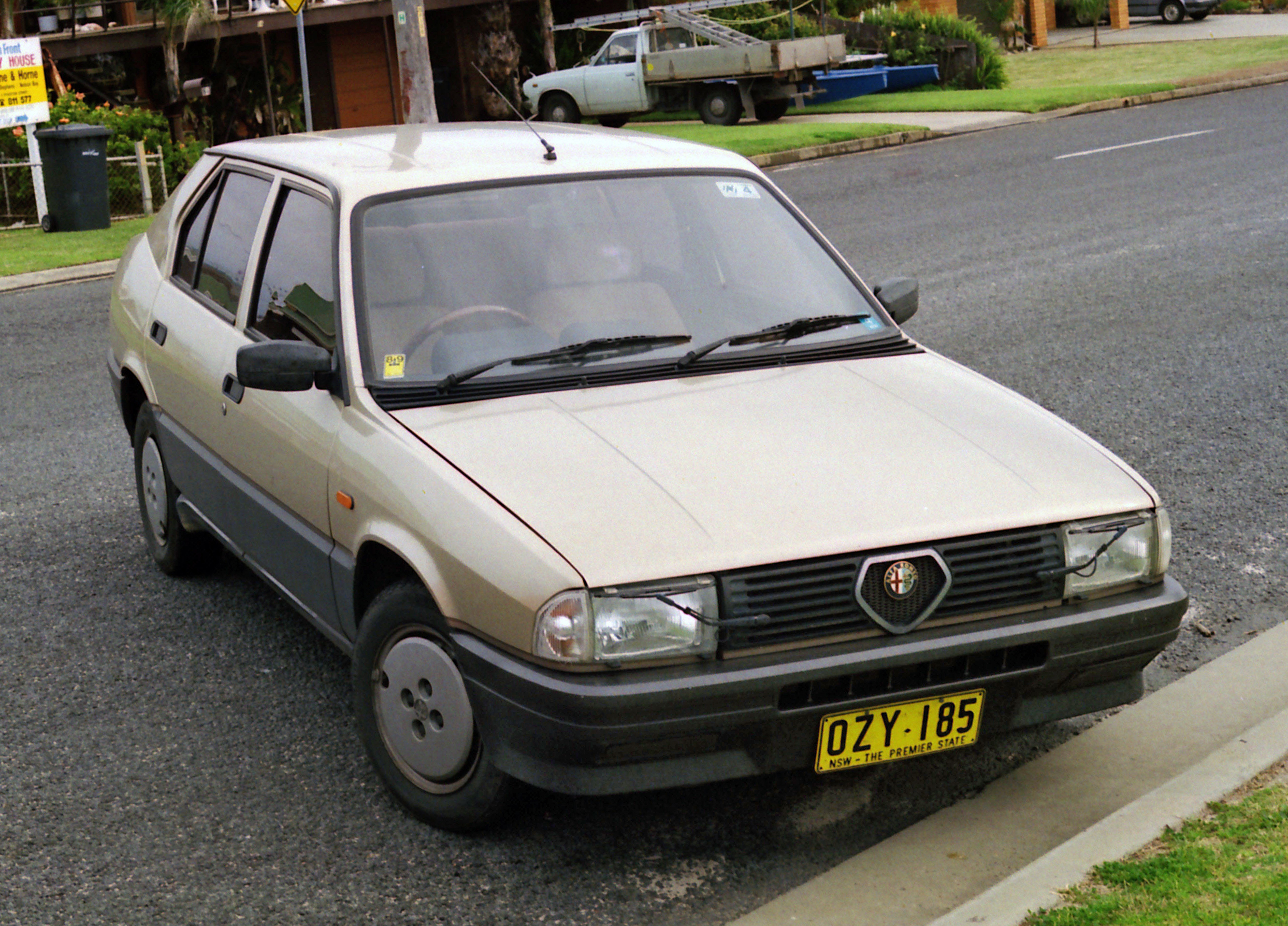
1984 Alfa Romeo 33

One event that temporarily improved the situation was the 1983 launch of the new model that replaced the Alfasud, the 33. The 33 was based on the chassis and mechanics of the model it replaced, but featured a body with modern lines. The 33 was very well received commercially and thus gave some breathing room to the company's coffers. It also proved successful with the 4x4 and family versions; the latter, in particular, helped to spread this type of bodywork among Italians. Until then, family cars were considered only suitable for use as work vehicles. As a consequence of the launch of the 33 family car, and also due to the counterpart version of the Lancia Thema, Italians began to appreciate this body type as a family car as well. Also in 1983 came to life the attempted joint venture with the Japanese manufacturer Nissan that led to the production of the Arna: based on the chassis of the Nissan Cherry and equipped with the 33's mechanicals, the Arna did not, however, achieve the hoped-for success because potential customers did not recognize in this model the characteristic features typical of the Biscione manufacturer's cars, from which the model was far away, thus resulting in a resounding commercial flop. With this model, Alfa Romeo's prestige reached the lowest point in its history.

At this point Alfa Romeo found itself lacking the cash to radically renew the range by replacing the older cars, so the management decided to launch a new flagship on the markets that would be based on the previous models. The 90 debuted on the markets in 1984 and replaced both the Alfetta and the Alfa 6. It was equipped with the former's mechanicals and a modern body designed by Bertone.

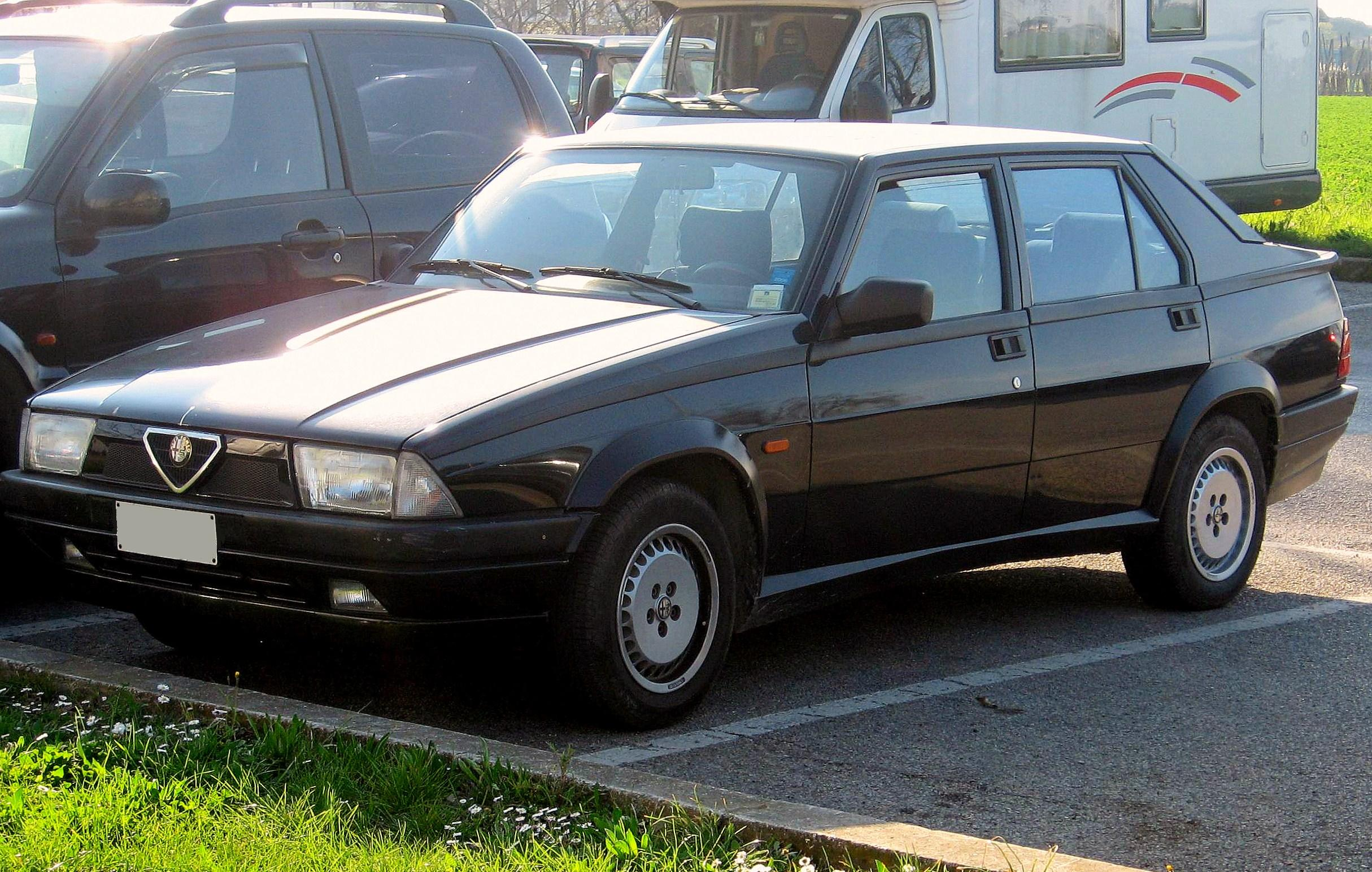
An Alfa Romeo 75

However, the new flagship was overshadowed by another new model that was based on the Alfetta, the 75. The 75, which replaced the Giulietta in 1985, was named after the founding anniversary of Alfa Romeo, which was 75 years old that very year, and was yet another result of the strategy of deriving new models from earlier cars. The 75 was successful in the markets and was the first Alfa Romeo to be fitted with the new Twin Spark engine. However, this was not the company's first powerplant to have twin spark, which had debuted in 1914 on the Grand Prix. The 75 was Alfa Romeo's last rear-wheel drive sports sedan until the debut of the Giulia in 2015 and was offered in markets with a wide range of engines.

On the racing front, these years saw plenty of accomplishments especially due to the GTV 6, which won the European Touring Car Championship in the 1982, 1983, and 1984 seasons. In 1985 it was decided to liquidate Autodelta; from the following year, races were again managed by Alfa Corse, whose name had already been associated with a structure that had been in charge of the Biscione car manufacturer's competitions.

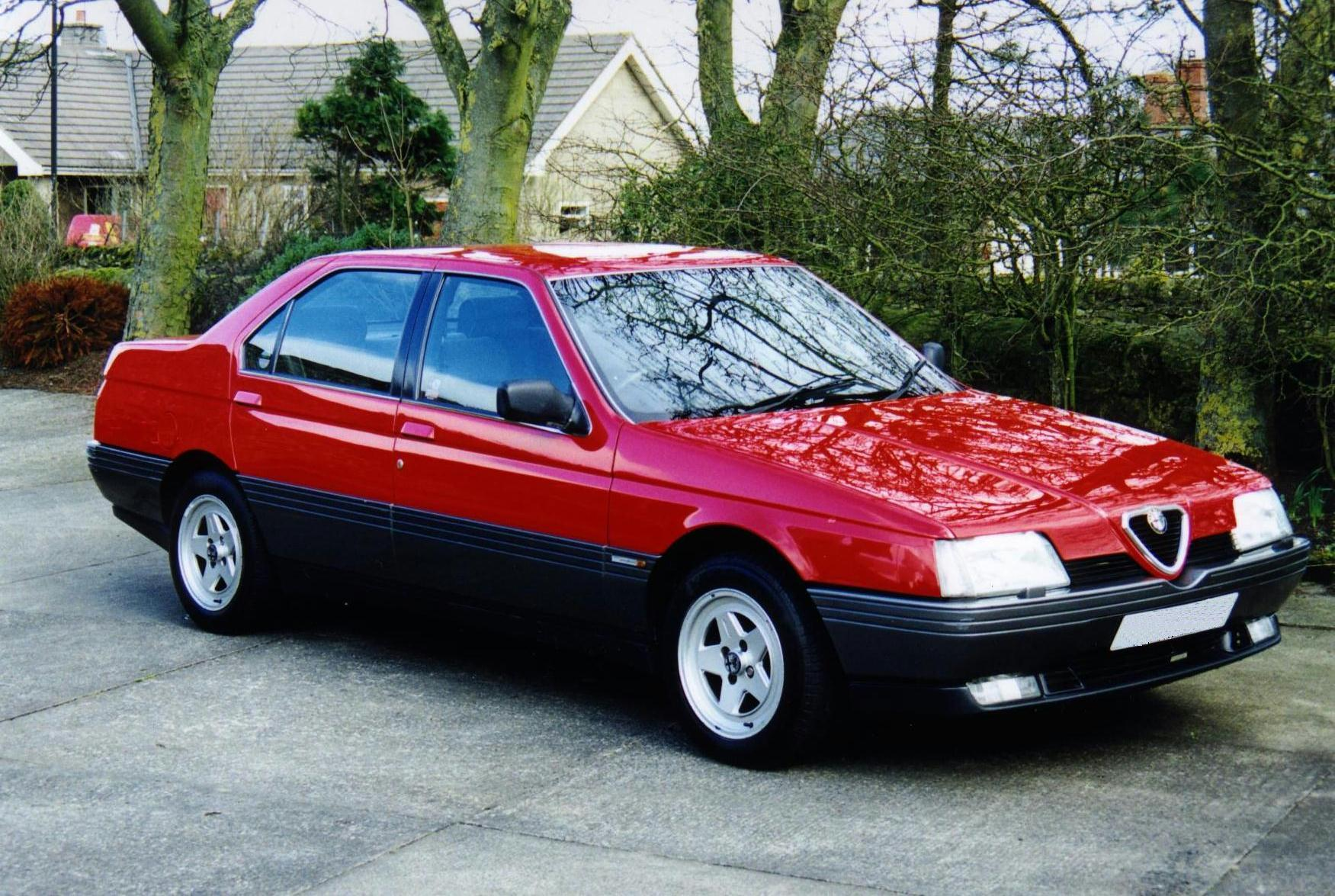
An Alfa Romeo 164

However, the company, despite launching models that were commercially successful, still had its finances in the red. This financial situation was mainly due to high production costs; for example, in the early 1980s, Alfa Romeo spent three times as much to assemble an Alfetta as the price at which the model was then sold to the public. With the aim of reducing IRI's losses, the Italian government at the time instructed the president of the holding company of state industries, Romano Prodi, to sell the Biscione car manufacturer, which in the meantime had reached a real debt of more than 2,000 billion lire (thus well over the officially recognized 700 billion) to a private group. In 1986, after a heated battle with Ford, the Fiat group acquired Alfa Romeo thanks to Prodi's intercession, which prevented, not without controversy, the purchase by the U.S. automotive group. After the acquisition, Fiat decided to merge Alfa Romeo with another company in the group, Lancia, creating "Alfa-Lancia Industriale," to whose presidency Vittorio Ghidella was appointed. At the same time, the new ownership decided to optimize the car range with the exit of the Arna and the 90 and the updating of the other models that remained on the catalog.

In 1987 the 164 was introduced, the flagship born on the development of the Tipo4 floorpan of Fiat origin, together with Lancia and SAAB. This was made possible by an agreement between Alfa Romeo and the two competing car groups prior to Fiat's purchase, the purpose of which was to keep model design and development costs down. However, the 164 featured a distinctive stylistic design by Pininfarina. The model represented a milestone in the company's history, as it was the first Alfa Romeo flagship with front-wheel drive. Meanwhile, prior to the launch of new models that would be based on Fiat Group floorpans, the 75 and 33 had been revised in 1988 and 1989, respectively. Also in 1989, a limited series coupe was unveiled that was intended to revive Alfa Romeo's sporty reputation. The SZ was then joined in 1991 by the RZ, its convertible version. The SZ was the first Alfa Romeo model entirely designed and produced under the leadership of the Fiat group, while retaining a mechanical design derived from the Alfetta. In 1988, however, production of the vans ended. The last two models produced, the AR6 and AR8, originated from an agreement with Iveco and were rebadged Fiat Ducato and Iveco Daily, respectively. With them, the production of Alfa Romeo-branded commercial vehicles ended.

== The 1990s ==
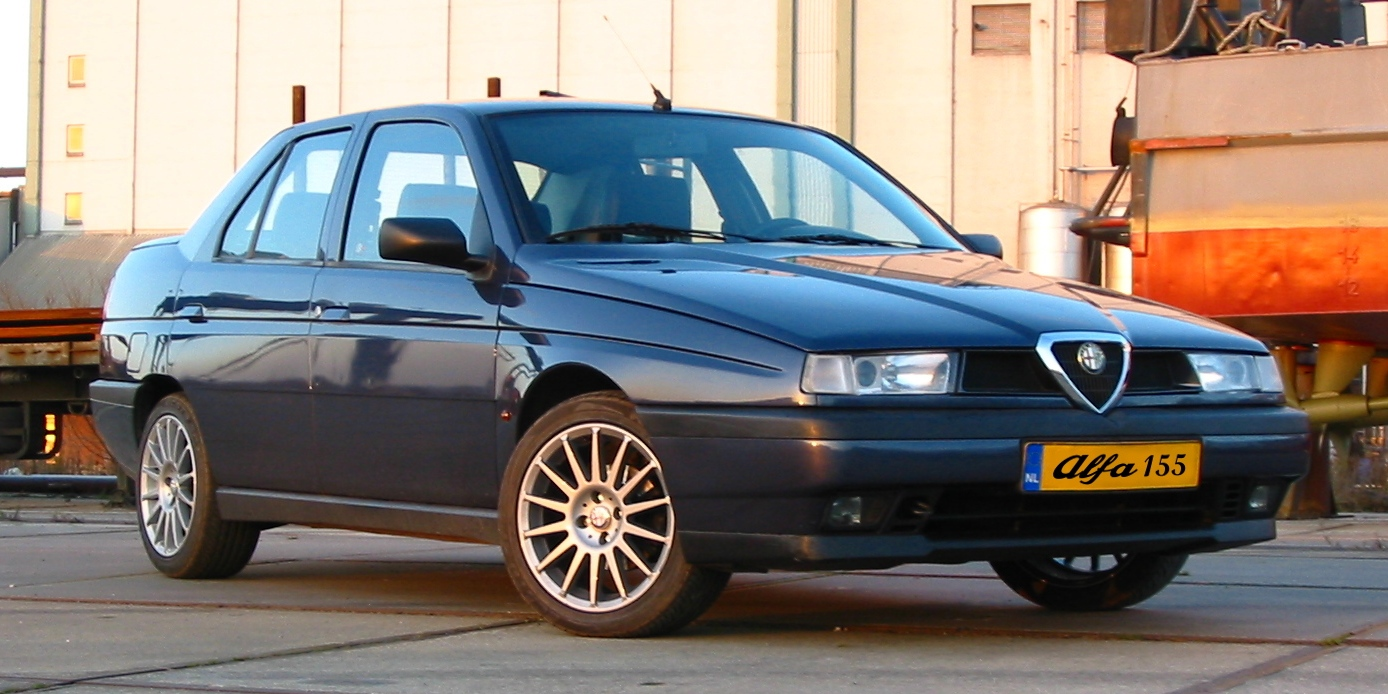
An Alfa Romeo 155

The beginning of the final decade of the 20th century was marked by the last update of the Spider Duetto, the origins of which stretched back to the 1960s. These changes, which were introduced in 1990, included the installation of body-color bumpers and the revision of the rear end, the design of which was now influenced by that of the 164.

In contrast, the second model designed and developed by the new ownership was the 155, which was introduced in 1992. It was based on the Tipo2 floorpan, which was already used by many cars in the group at the time. The 155 was assembled at the Pomigliano d'Arco plant. Due to the mechanics in synergy with other group cars and the abandonment of rear-wheel drive in favor of front-wheel drive, the 155 was not welcomed by the Alfisti, despite the presence of refined mechanical solutions such as the "Twin Spark" twin-shaft engines with dual ignition system and phase shifter or the technology of the Q4 all-wheel drive version, which was derived from that of the Lancia Delta Integrale. Fiat decided to derive the mechanics of Alfa Romeo models from those of Fiat cars with the aim of keeping costs down, choosing solutions that simplified as much as possible the schemes that were the basis of the suspension, transmission and other elements, while also paying attention to the ease of maintenance of the mechanical components. The 155, in competition, won several national Touring Car Championships, including the prestigious Deutsche Tourenwagen Meisterschaft thus interrupting the dominance of German cars.

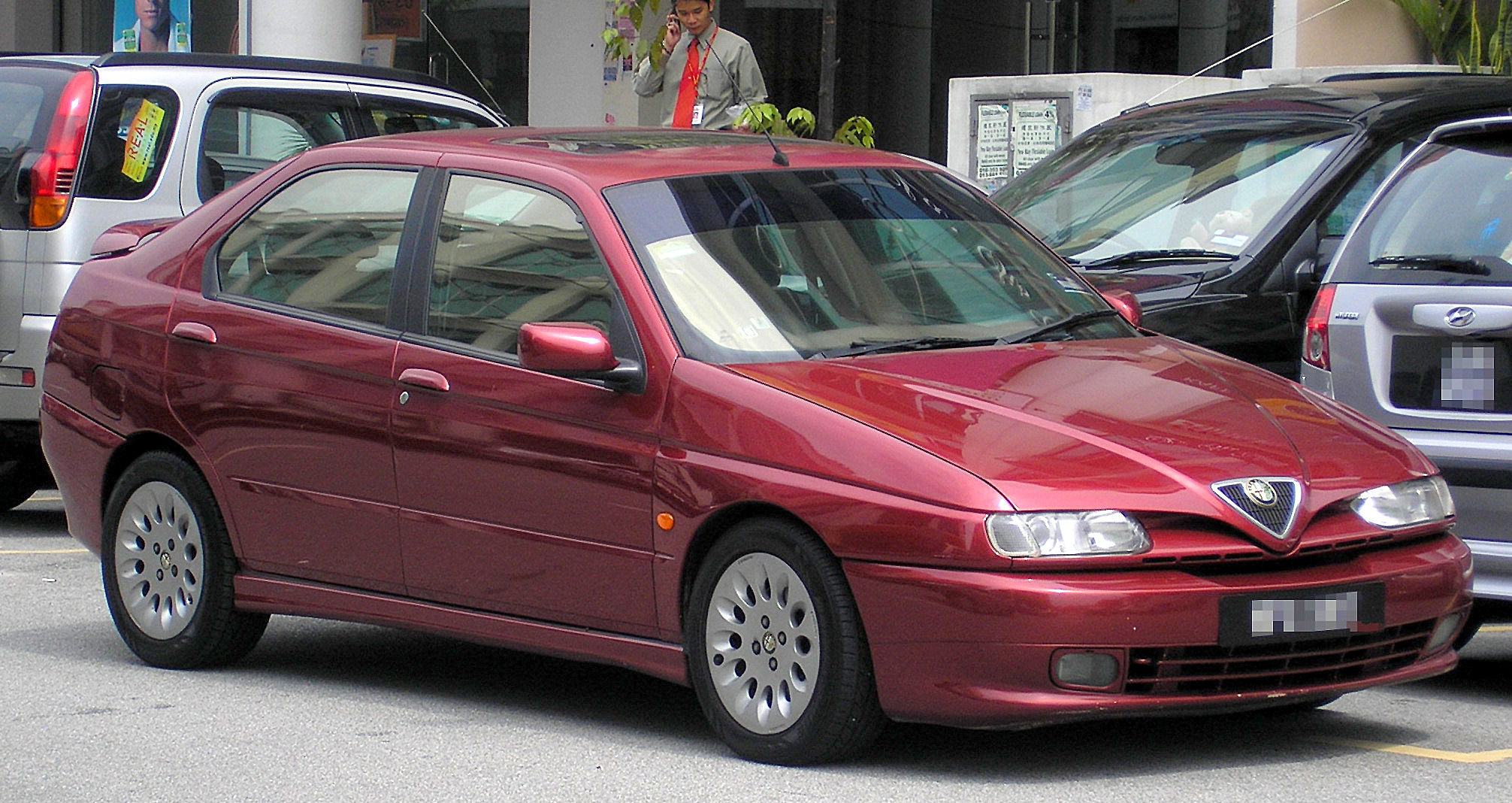
An Alfa Romeo 146

Shortly thereafter, the two models that replaced the 33 were launched, the 145 and 146, which debuted in 1994 and 1995, respectively. Both cars were sedans based on the 155's floorpan and featured a body with innovative features: the 145 was small in size and possessed a three-door, hatchback body, while the 146 was a five-door hatchback. The two models inherited Alfa Romeo boxer engines from the 33, which were replaced a few years later by Twin Spark engines.

1995 was also the debut year of another pair of models that revived this time two historical names for the Biscione company: the GTV and the Spider. They were introduced to revive the brand's sporty reputation and thus were equipped with high-performance engines. However, the mechanicals were derived from those of the Fiat Tipo, although an adaptation was made to provide sportiness to the models. Due in part to competition from their German counterparts, however, the two models were not as successful as hoped.

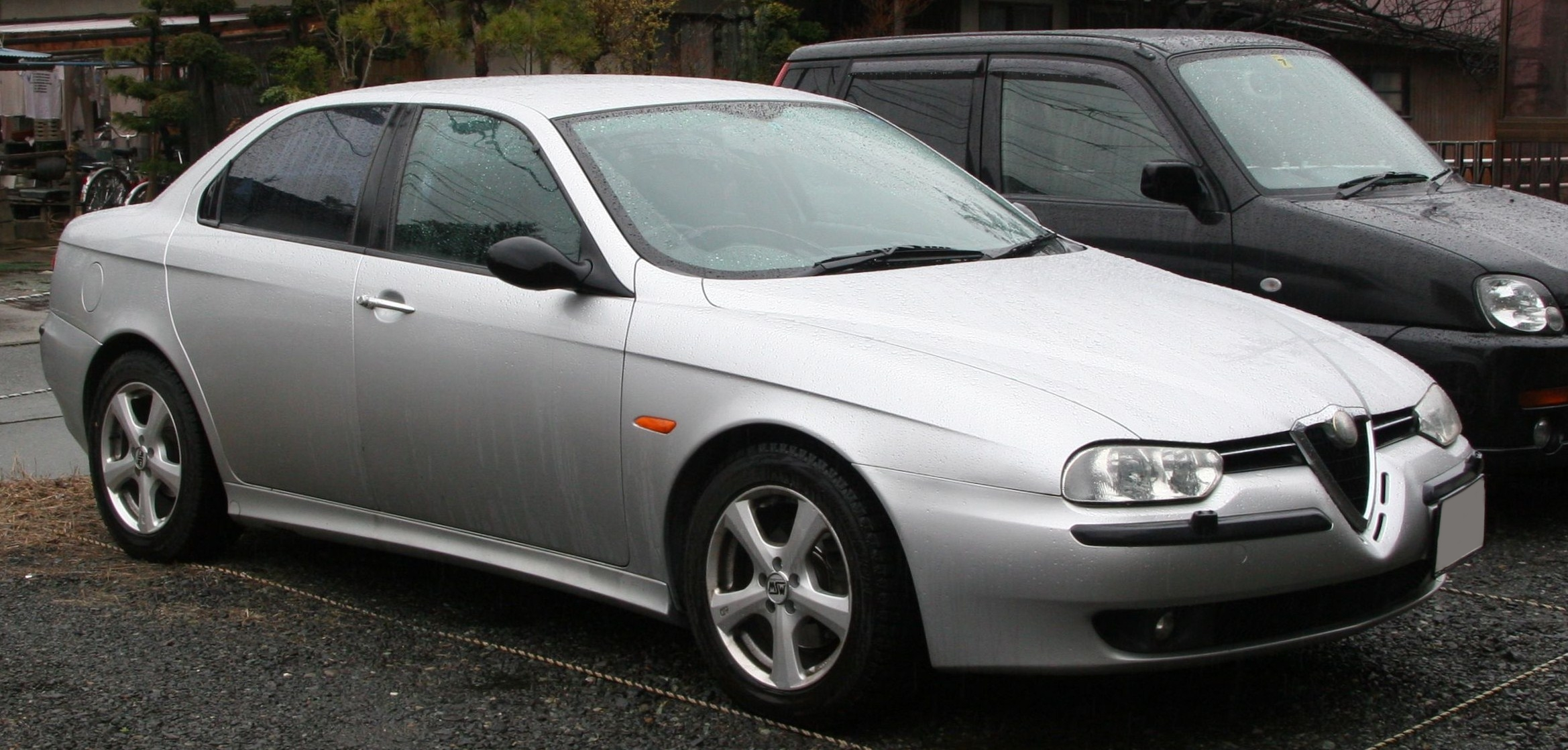
An Alfa Romeo 156

The breakthrough year for Alfa Romeo was 1997, due to the launch of the 156. The 156 replaced the unsuccessful 155 and marked, with its sporty and innovative lines, a break with the cars of the past while marking the beginning of a new styling concept that was later applied to the following models as well, albeit with various updates. This new styling concept, which was the work of Walter de Silva, combined the characteristic lines of famous Alfa Romeo models of the past with modern styling cues. The 156 was immediately a remarkable and unexpected success so much so that it won the Car of the Year award in 1998, partly due to its refined mechanics. It was on this model that the selespeed transmission was introduced for the first time, i.e., a semi-automatic transmission with two levers behind the steering wheel that controlled the shifting of the gears; this gearbox was derived from the racing world and its launch was made to allow a sporty use of the car. The 156 was also the first car in the world to have the common rail turbo diesel engine installed. In 2000, a family version, the Sportwagon, was introduced.

In 1998 production of the 164 ended, giving way to the company's new flagship, the 166. The 166 came with even more generous dimensions than its progenitor but retaining front-wheel drive. The latter aspect generated discontent among Alfisti, partly in light of the trend followed by rival brands, which was directed toward marketing rear-wheel drive models. However, the 166 had a very comfortable interior and particularly rich furnishings that made the model suitable, among other things, for long routes. The 166 was withdrawn from the market in 2007 after being commercially successful.

In terms of competition, Alfa Romeo won four European touring car drivers' titles (2000 to 2003) with the 156 during this period, thanks to Fabrizio Giovanardi and Gabriele Tarquini, and three European touring car championships (2000 to 2002).

== The 2000s and 2010s ==
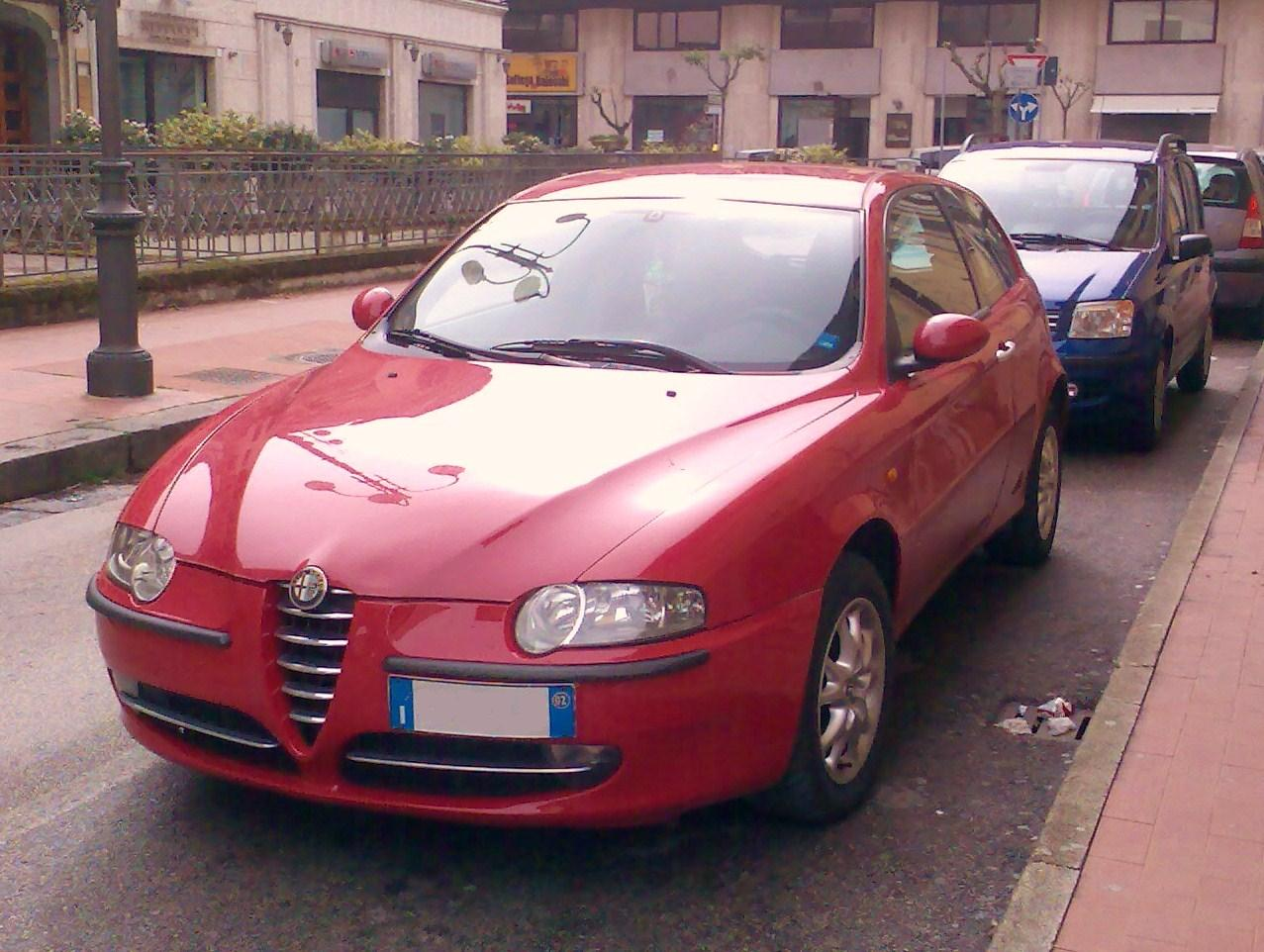
An Alfa Romeo 147

The new millennium began for the Biscione manufacturer under excellent commercial auspices. The new model that was introduced in 2000, the compact 147, was a great success among the public and managed to win the Das Goldene Lenkrad award in 2000 and the title of Car of the Year in 2001. From a stylistic point of view, the introduction on the 147 of a front end with sharper and more defined lines, reminiscent of that of the 1900, marked the beginning of a new stylistic pattern that would mark the front parts of later models and facelifts of cars on the catalog.

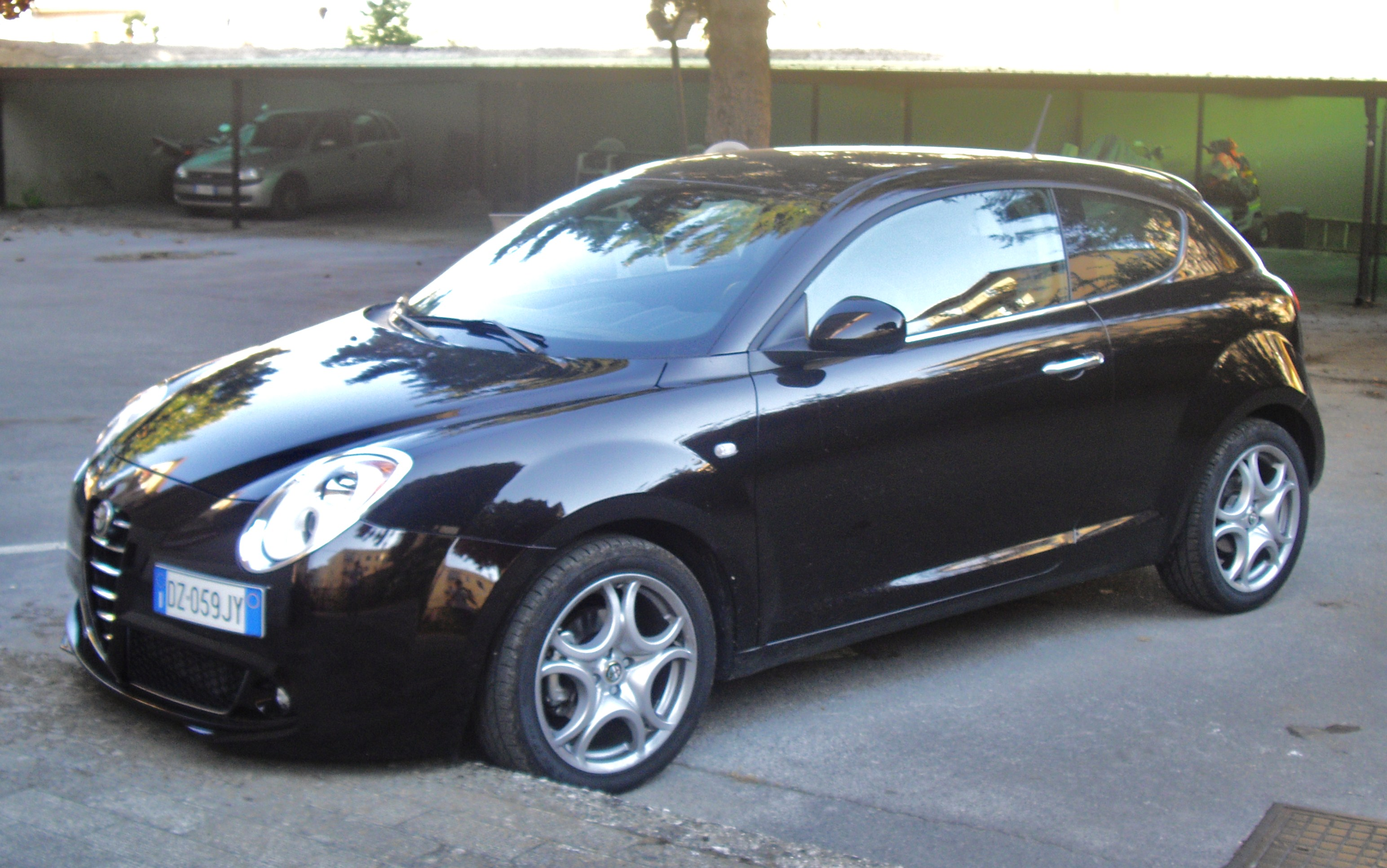
An Alfa Romeo MiTo

The year 2003 was marked by the updating of the entire range, which was achieved through a radical facelift. The 156, Spider, GTV and 166 were renewed. Also in 2003 came the presentation of the GT model, which won the "World's Most Beautiful Car" award the following year. In 2004 the 147 was updated and two new versions of the 156, the Q4 and the GT, were launched on the markets.

In 2005, the 159 debuted, which was the mid to upper-range model that replaced the 156. Designed by Giugiaro, the 159 was basically an evolution of the model it replaced despite having larger dimensions and weight. The car was made in cooperation with the General Motors group; the floorpan was the result of a cooperation with the Opel brand, which, however, was not followed up. The 159 was equipped with a wide range of engines from which customers could choose, and was offered in both sedan and family Sportwagon versions. The same year saw the debut of a new sports coupe, again born from the pencil of Giorgetto Giugiaro and taking the place of the GTV: the Brera.

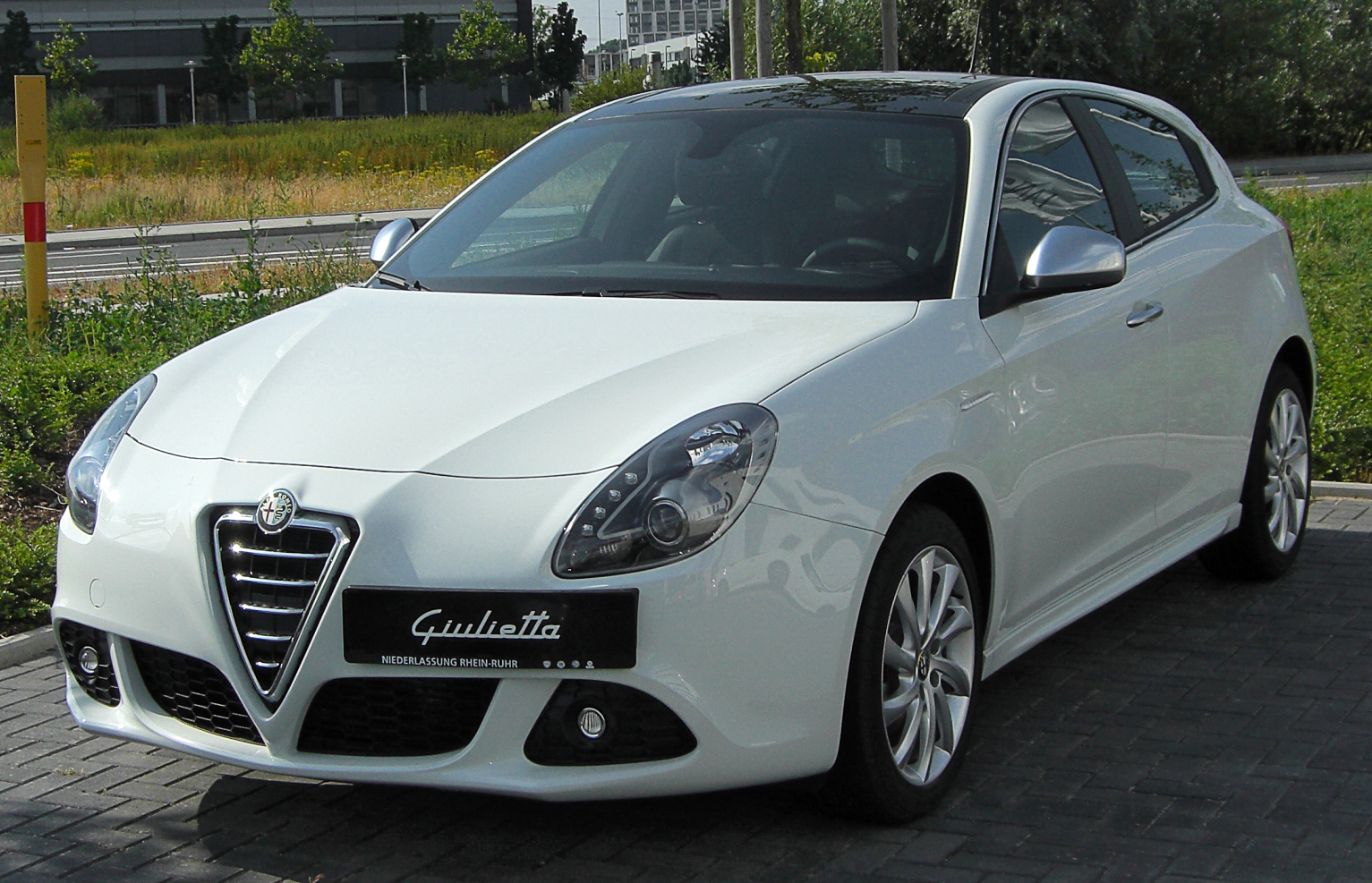
An Alfa Romeo Giulietta

In 2006 the new Spider was introduced, which was an evolution of the Brera and replaced the previous model of the same name. 2007 was the time of the debut of the sporty 8C Competizione, whose shapes were inspired by the 33 Stradale. It was marketed in a limited series, and the planned 500 examples were all sold as soon as they were introduced to the market to wealthy customers. It was equipped with a 4.7 l, 450 hp V8 Maserati Squadra Corse engine, which was assembled by Ferrari and derived from the powerplant fitted on the Maserati 4200 GT. The model took its name from the eight-cylinder-engined Alfa Romeo cars marketed in the 1930s and 1940s and marked the Biscione company's return to rear-wheel drive. The car was very successful, and for that reason the Fiat group decided to also make a spyder version, which went into production in 2009. Only 500 examples of the open version were assembled.

In June 2008 came the commercial launch of the compact MiTo ("Mi" for Milan, where Alfa Romeo was born, and "To" for Turin, where it was built), which was designed to try to boost sales by extending the range downward. It was positioned below the 147 and – because of its sporty and dynamic appearance – was designed to appeal to young audiences. The MiTo is based on the SCCS platform and was the first Alfa Romeo to be assembled at Fiat's Mirafiori plant. The MiTo is available with a wide choice of engines and has a decidedly low Cx (0.29), a consequence of a thorough study of aerodynamics.

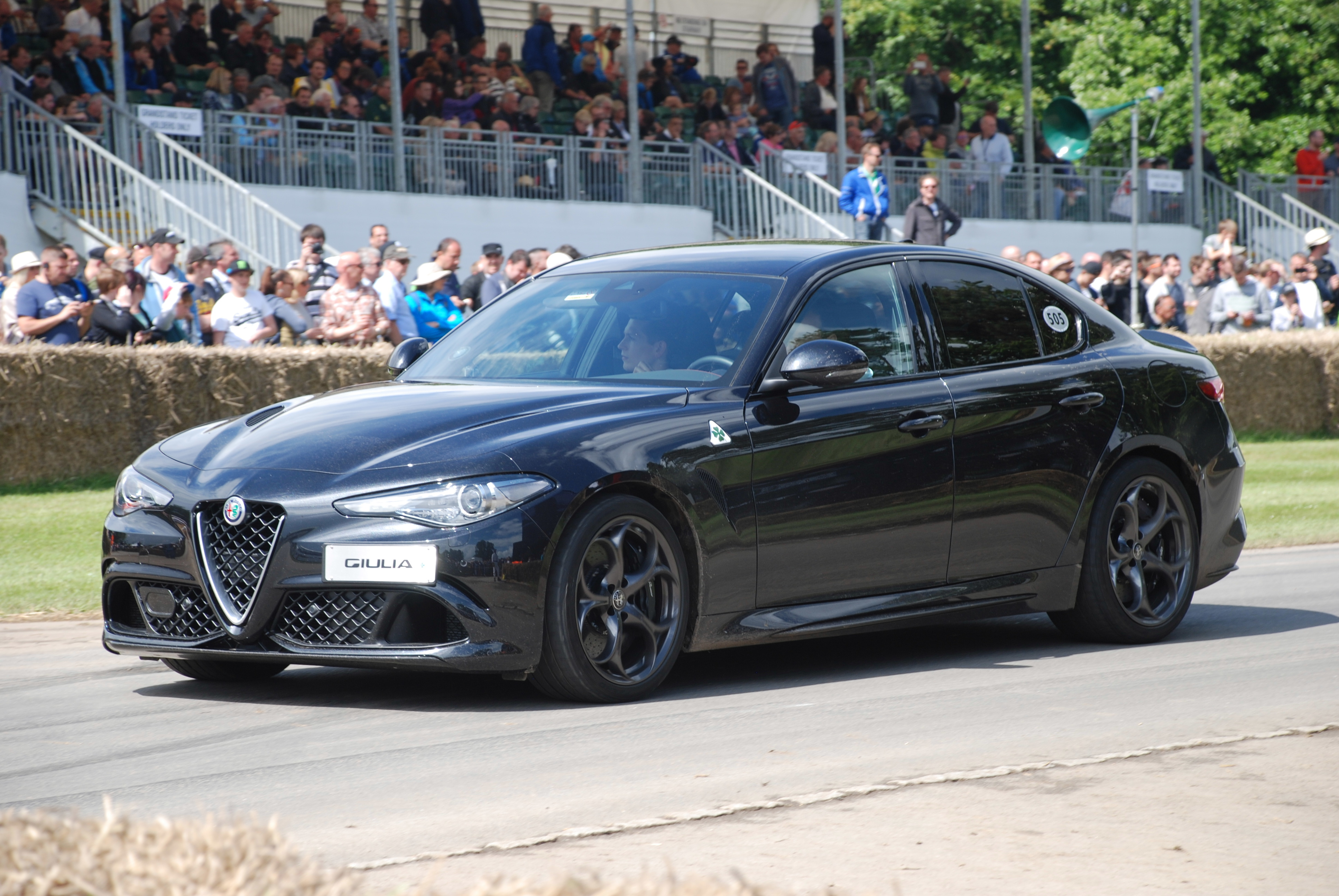
Alfa Romeo Giulia Quadrifoglio

In 2010, to mark the 100th anniversary of the company's founding, Alfa Romeo unveiled the model that replaced the 147, the Giulietta. The car is based on the new Fiat Compact platform and has sought-after mechanical features such as a dual-clutch transmission. The Giulietta also features the start-stop system, Alfa Romeo DNA (introduced on the MiTo in 2008), electronic stability control, and Q2 differential. Also in 2010, Zagato presented the TZ3, which was assembled in ten units (including the one-off example). The centenary also saw a rationalization of the lineup, with the GT, Brera and Spider being discontinued.

In 2013, on the other hand, the 4C entered production, with which Alfa Romeo returned to rear-wheel drive in a production car (not limited) after about two decades. On June 24, 2015, on the occasion of the 105th anniversary of the company's founding, the Giulia was unveiled at the Alfa Romeo Historical Museum which was followed on November 16, 2016, by the presentation of the first SUV produced by the company, called the Stelvio, which shares a platform and engines with the Giulia.

At the end of July 2018, production of the MiTo ceased, with no immediate replacement in its segment. On February 8, 2022, the second SUV produced by the company, called Tonale, was unveiled in a world preview.

== See also ==
- Alfa Romeo
- Alfa Romeo Avio
- Alfa Corse
- Alfa Romeo in motorsport
- Alfa Romeo in Formula One

== Bibliography ==
- Gianluca Pellegrini, ed. (2003). L'Enciclopedia dell'auto - Quattroruote. Rozzano: Editoriale Domus.
- Renzo De Vecchi, Leone Boccali, ed. (1939). Enciclopedia illustrata del calcio italiano (1 ed.). Milano: Edizioni del Calcio Illustrato.
- Sannia, Alessandro (2010). Alfa Romeo - 100 anni di leggenda. Milano: Gribaudo.
- Tabucchi, Maurizio (2010). Alfa Romeo 1910 - 2010. Milano: Giorgio Nada Editore.
- Owen, David (1985). Grandi Marche - Alfa Romeo. Milano: Edizioni Acanthus.
- Massaro, Sergio (2006). Alfa Romeo, cuore sportivo - La storia, lo sport, gli uomini, le macchine. Giunti Editore.
- Sergio Massaro (2000). Ferrari. Un mito. Demetra.
- Hull, Peter; Roy Slater (1970). La storia dell'Alfa Romeo. Baldini e Castoldi.
