= Museo Alfa Romeo =

Museo Alfa Romeo - La macchina del tempo
- Museo Storico Alfa Romeo
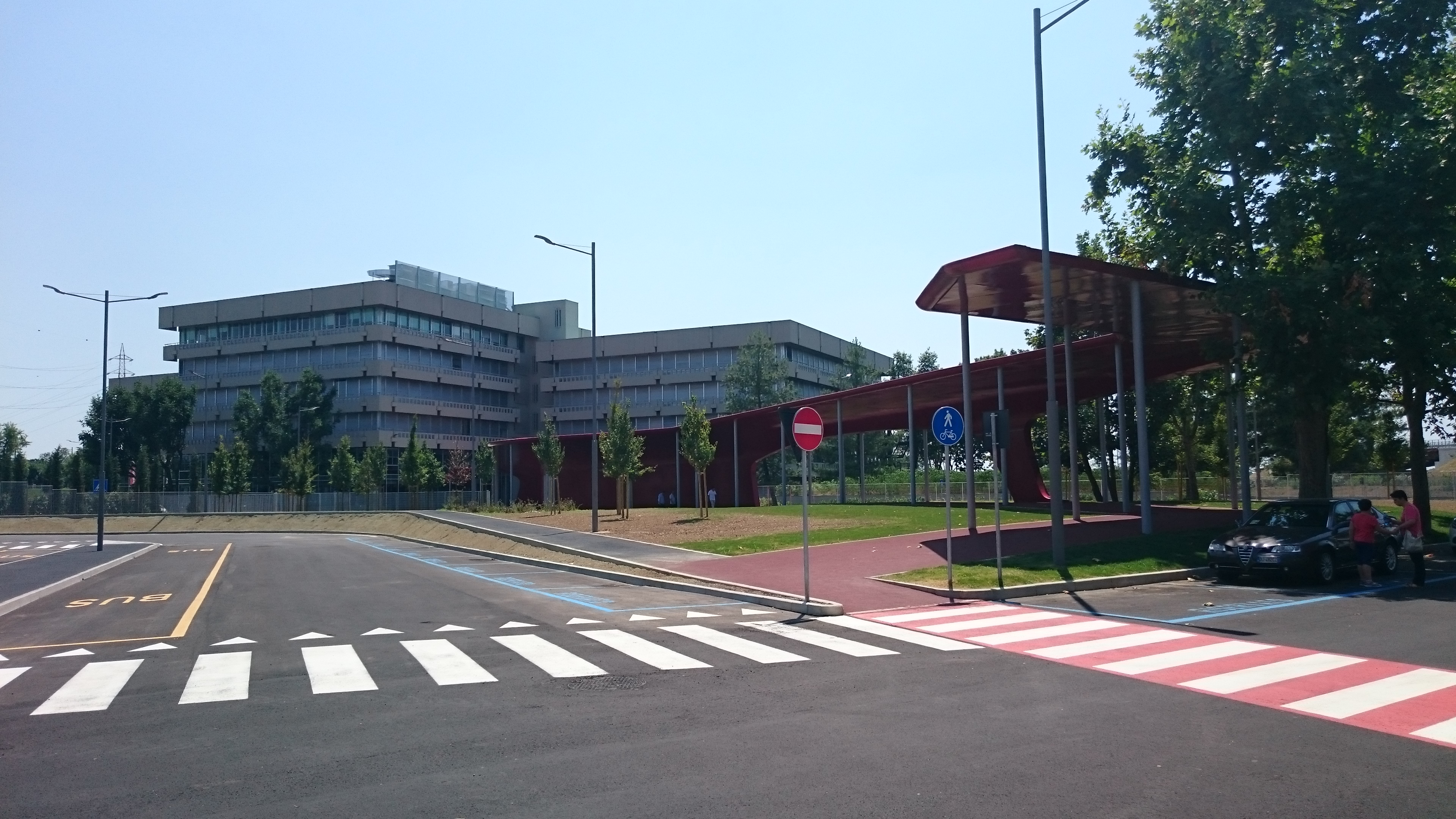
- The museum in 2015, after the renovation work

- Location within Lombardy Location within Italy
- Established: 18 December 1976; 49 years ago
- Location: Viale Alfa Romeo, Arese, Milan, Italy
- Coordinates: 45.557400°N 9.046120°E
- Type: Automobile museum
- Collections: Automobiles, automobile and aircraft engines
- Visitors: 10,500 (2006)
- Founders: Giuseppe Luraghi and Gaetano Cortesi
- Owner: Stellantis
- Website: www.museoalfaromeo.com

Museo Storico Alfa Romeo (Alfa Romeo Historical Museum; subsequently called Museo Alfa Romeo - La macchina del tempo, literally Alfa Romeo Museum - The time machine) is Alfa Romeo's official museum, located in Arese (Milan), and displaying a permanent collection of Alfa Romeo cars and engines.

After being closed down in 2011, the museum reopened in June 2015.

== History ==
The museum was officially inaugurated on 18 December 1976, and is located in the former Alfa Romeo Arese factory area. Production of cars ended in 2002 and engine production in 2006 in Arese factory complex.

At the beginning of 2009 the museum was closed down a first time for renovations and opened in the end of the year, to celebrate Alfa Romeo's 100th birthday in 2010. It was closed once more in February 2011, reportedly for renovation work again. The renovation project was laid down at the end of 2013, and restoration work only started in Summer 2014. Centerpiece of the renewed structure are Alfa red projecting roofs added to the original 1970s structure.

After four years the Museum officially reopened on 24 June 2015, when it hosted the press unveiling of the all-new Alfa Romeo Giulia and Alfa Romeo logo, both key steps in the relaunch of the brand. On 30 June 2015 the museum reopened to the public.

== Description ==
The museum is dedicated to over 100 years of history of the Alfa Romeo marque, whose production included automobiles, commercial vehicles, railway locomotives, tractors, buses, trams, marine and aircraft engines.

The museum spreads over 4,800 square metres (52,000 sq ft). Its six floors are divided into four theme areas, including a historical review of all Alfa Romeo road cars produced since 1910, prototypes and dream cars, aircraft and aeronautical projects, and scale models and awards.

The museum collection numbers over 250 cars and 150 engines, of which approximately half were on display. These included at least one example of each model produced, plus prototypes and racing cars. Some of the museum cars are regularly on loan for festivals and historical events, like Pebble Beach Concours d'Elegance, the Goodwood Festival of Speed and Mille Miglia.

The renewed 2015 exhibit includes 69 cars.

== Scuderia del Portello ==
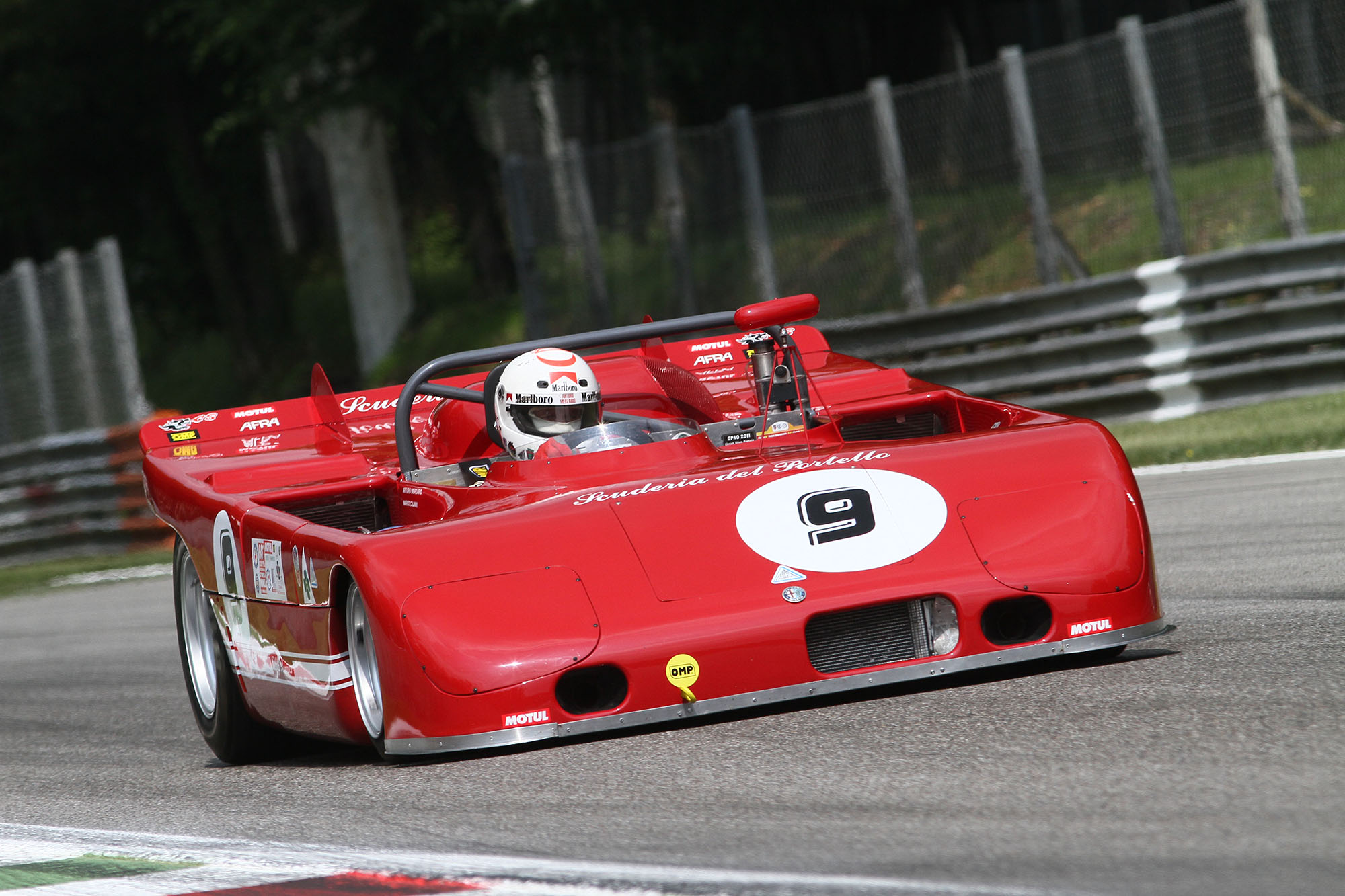
Arturo Merzario with Alfa Romeo 33 TT in Monza

Scuderia del Portello is an Italian sports association dedicated to the activities of Alfa Romeo cars and historic models in motorsport and rallies; the official club is located at the Alfa Romeo Museum in Arese.

On February 3, 1982, the journalist Luca Grandori, together with Edilberto Mandelli, Pietro Rondo, Giorgio Schoen, Stefano Senin and Renato Ughi, founded the Scuderia in Arese as part of the Centro Direzionale Alfa Romeo with the patronage of the mother company. The name recalled the suburbs of Milan where the company's first factories were built.

The Scuderia was conceived as a structure for giving support and technical assistance to drivers racing Alfa Romeo cars which were no longer in production, but the articles of association stated that its aim was also to promote the brand, as well as to safeguard its historical and technological heritage, as a contribution to the history of car racing. It immediately became the official Alfa Romeo team for historical car races.

In 1990 Scuderia del Portello changed its statute and broadened its activity to also include modern racing cars, becoming an official club of the communication of the brand management. On that occasion the logo was changed as well, taking on its present appearance which recalls the form of the Alfa Romeo 1900 radiator.

The current president and team principal is Marco Cajani.

=== Activities ===
==== FIA Historic Racing Championships ====
The following are the maximum titles won by the Scuderia in FIA Historic racing Championships:

===== European Cup for Historic GT Cars =====
Year	Driver/Drivers	Car
1985	Giuseppe Lucchini	Alfa Romeo Giulia TZ
1986	Marco Cajani	Alfa Romeo SZ
1991	Mario Elviro Govoni	Alfa Romeo 1900 SS
1996	Roberto Radaelli	Alfa Romeo 1900 CSS Zagato
2006	Zampatti-Antonacci	Alfa Romeo 1900 CSS Zagato

===== European Challenge for Historic Touring Cars =====
Year	Driver/Drivers	Car
1989	Marco Cajani	Alfa Romeo 1900 Ti
1991	Zadra-Timbal	Alfa Romeo Giulia GTA
1992	Bruno Bonini	Alfa Romeo 1900 Ti
1993	Cajani-Chiavelli	Alfa Romeo 1900 SS
1993	Ambrogetti-Jasson	Alfa Romeo Giulia GTA
1994	Munari-Ambrogetti	Alfa Romeo Giulia GTA
1995	Cajani-Morazzoni	Alfa Romeo Giulietta Ti
1996	Faraci-Facetti	Alfa Romeo Giulia GTA
1998	Cajani-Maglione	Alfa Romeo Giulietta Ti
2004	Cajani-Rossi	Alfa Romeo Giulietta Ti
2005	Anton Dieter Karl	Alfa Romeo Giulia GTA

==== Other races ====
Scuderia del Portello has won eight Italian Historic Car Championships, and over 300 overall class victories in historical car races both in European and National championships.

In 1997 the Scuderia won the Tour Auto (revival of the Tour de France Automobile) with Cajani-Faraci (Alfa Romeo Giulietta Sprint Veloce), and in 2004, 2006, and 2007 the Tour de España, respectively with Jean Sage (Alfa Romeo Giulietta Ti), Sage-Entremont (Alfa Romeo 1900 Ti) and Cajani-Confaloni (Alfa Romeo 1900 CSS Zagato).

The Scuderia took part in the commemorations of important historical races such as the Carrera Panamericana (1990, 1991, 2002), where in 1991 it was awarded “best participating team”, and in 2002 won in the Sport Menor category with Arturo Merzario and Vinicio Marta (Alfa Romeo Giulietta Spider Veloce), and in the Original Panamericana category with Prisca Taruffi and Antonio Maglione (Alfa Romeo Giulietta Sprint Veloce). The Scuderia took part in two editions of the London–Sydney Marathon (1993 and 2000) and in the Peking to Paris in 2007. In 2004 it was the only racing team to take part in all six classes at Le Mans Classic, the historical reconstruction of the 24 Hours of Le Mans, and with Phil Hill it gained class victory with an Alfa Romeo 6C 3000 CMM.

In Italy, Scuderia del Portello members and cars usually participate in commemorations of the historical Mille Miglia and Targa Florio.

=== Relevant drivers ===
- (Italy) Bruno Bonini
- (Italy) Costantino Bertuzzi
- (Italy) Angelo Renato Chiapparini
- (England) Vic Elford
- (Italy) Carlo Facetti
- (Italy) Fabio Francia
- (Italy) Giovanni "Nanni" Galli
- (United States) Phil Hill
- (Italy) Arturo Merzario
- (Italy) Sandro Munari
- (Italy) Gino Munaron
- (Italy) Fabian Peroni
- (Italy) Gian Luigi Picchi
- (Italy) Luigi "Gino" Pozzo
- (Switzerland) Gian Claudio "Clay" Regazzoni
- (Italy) Alessandro Sgarzi
- (Italy) Prisca Taruffi
- (Italy) Nino Vaccarella
- (Australia) Ross Zampatti

== Selection of exhibits ==
Automotive section

Darraq (1908)

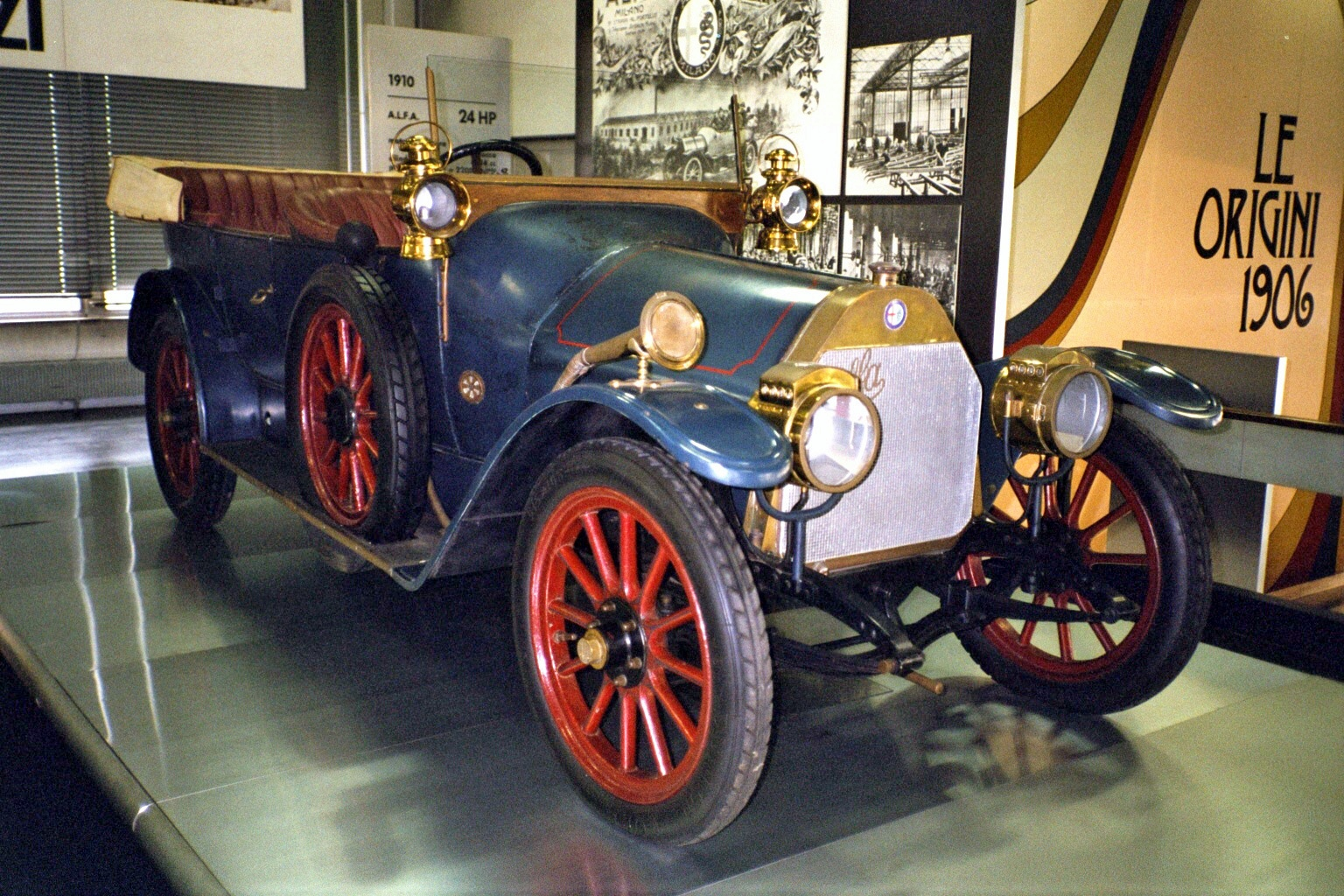
A.L.F.A 24 HP (1910)

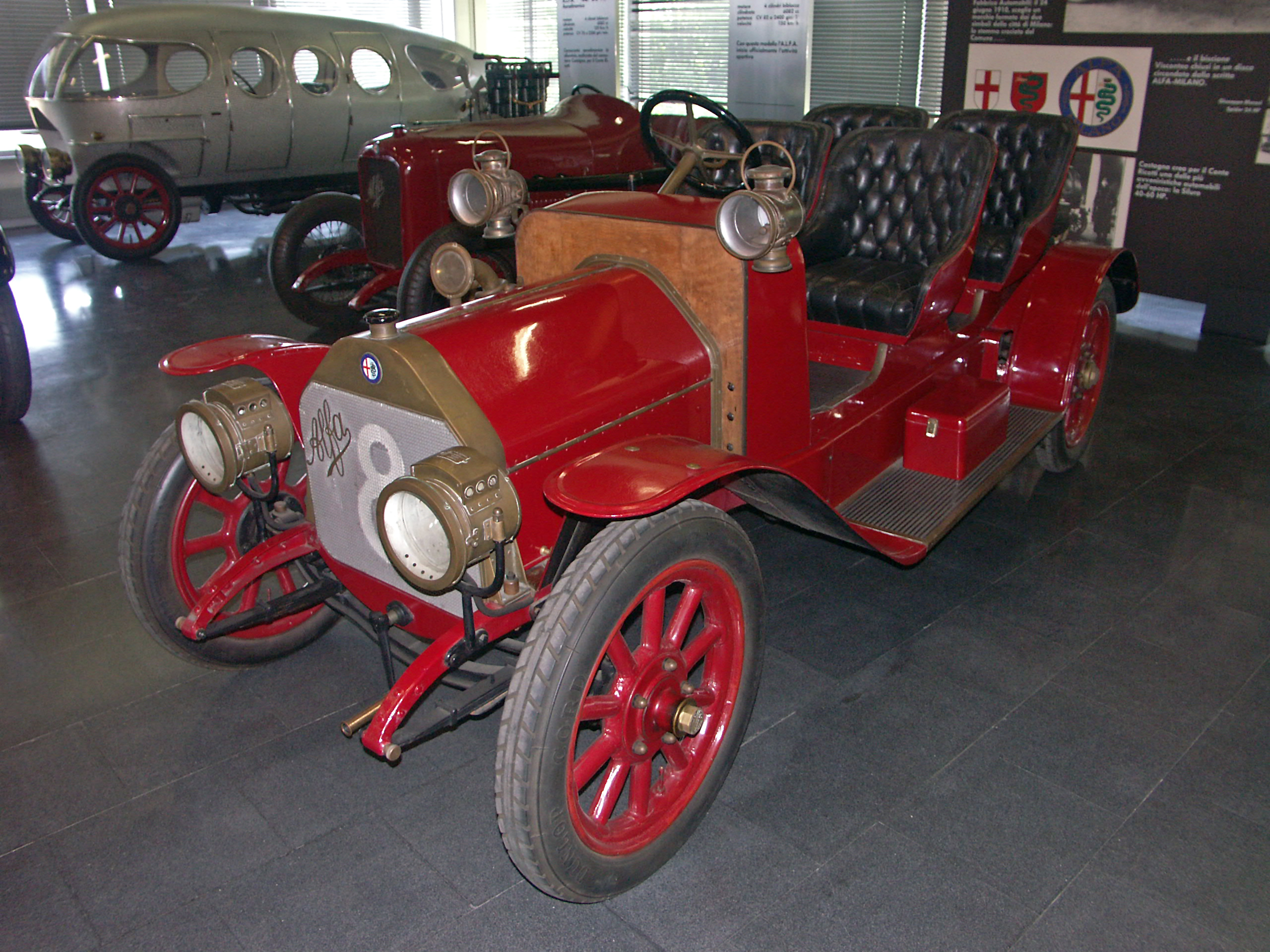
A.L.F.A 15 HP (1911)

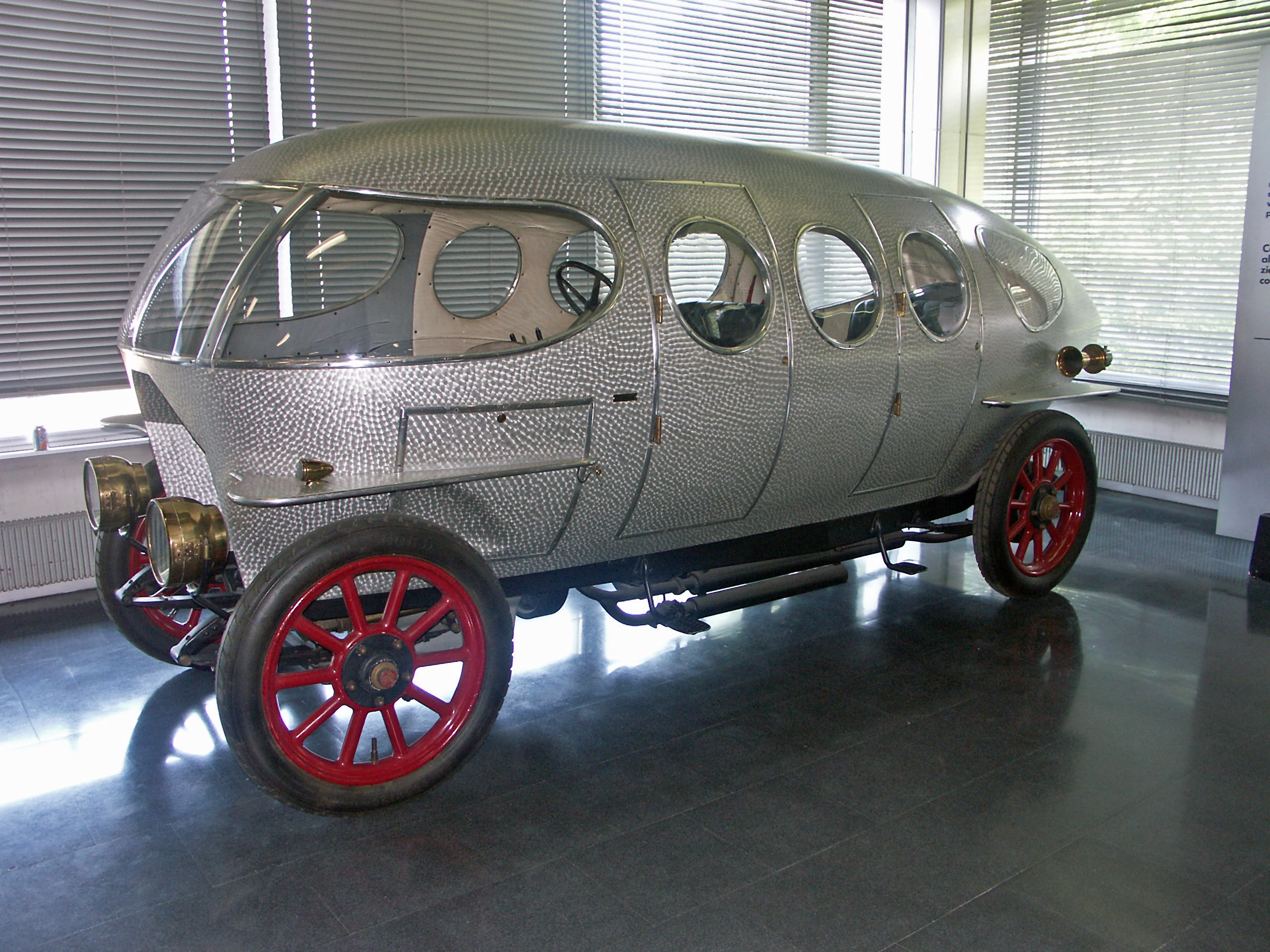
A.L.F.A 40/60 HP Aerodinamica (1911)

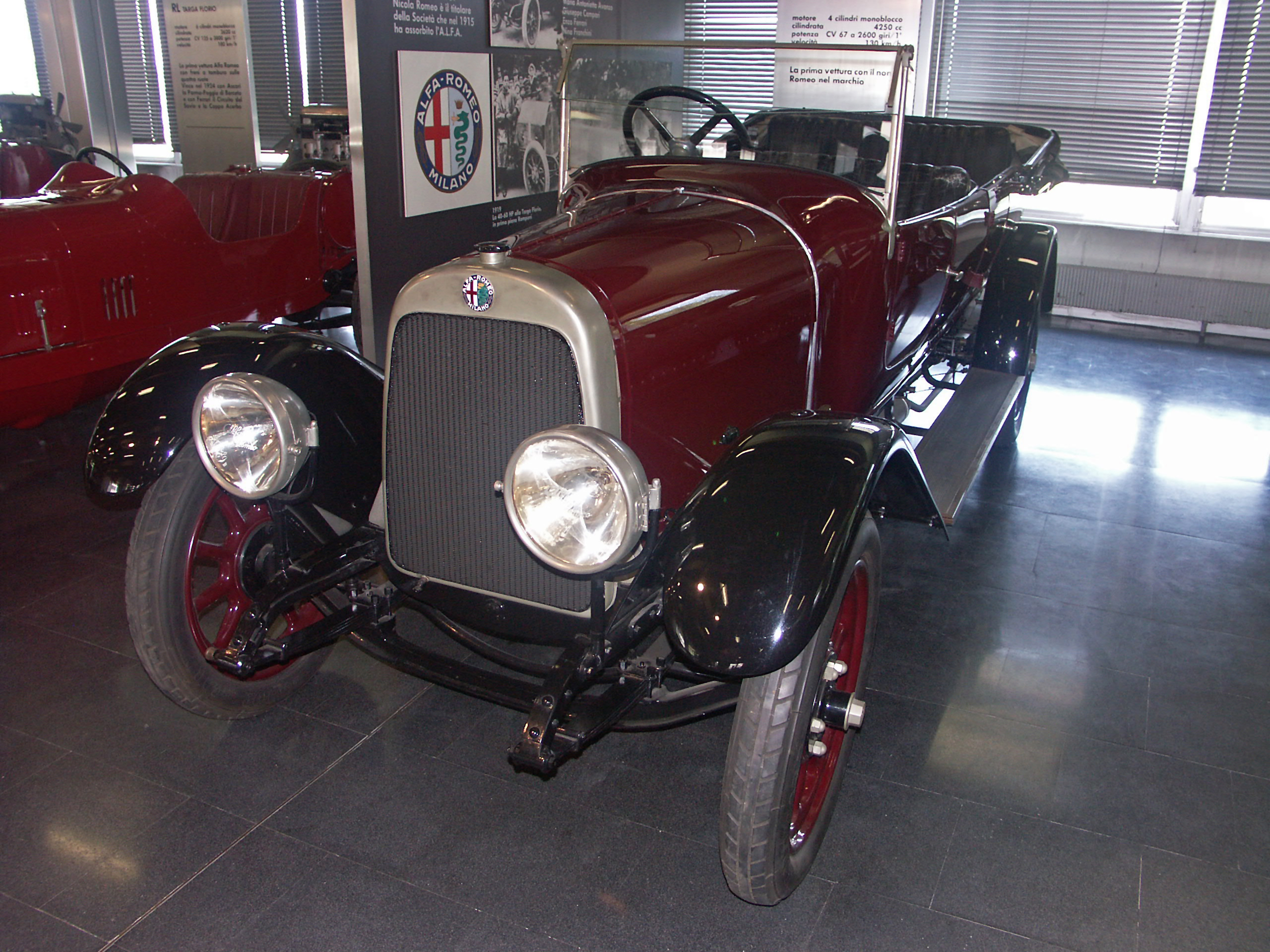
20/30 ES (1920)

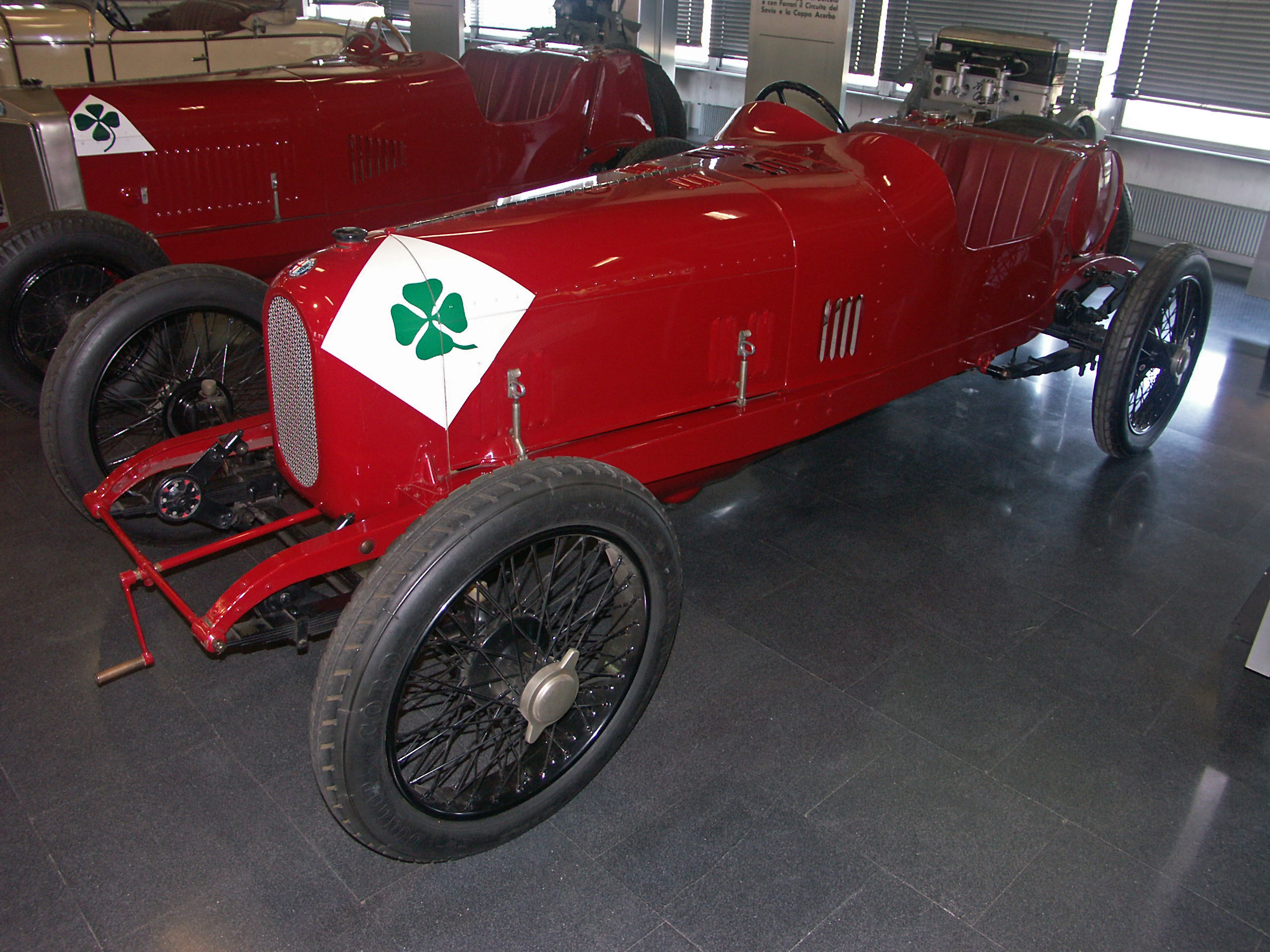
RL Targa Florio (1923)

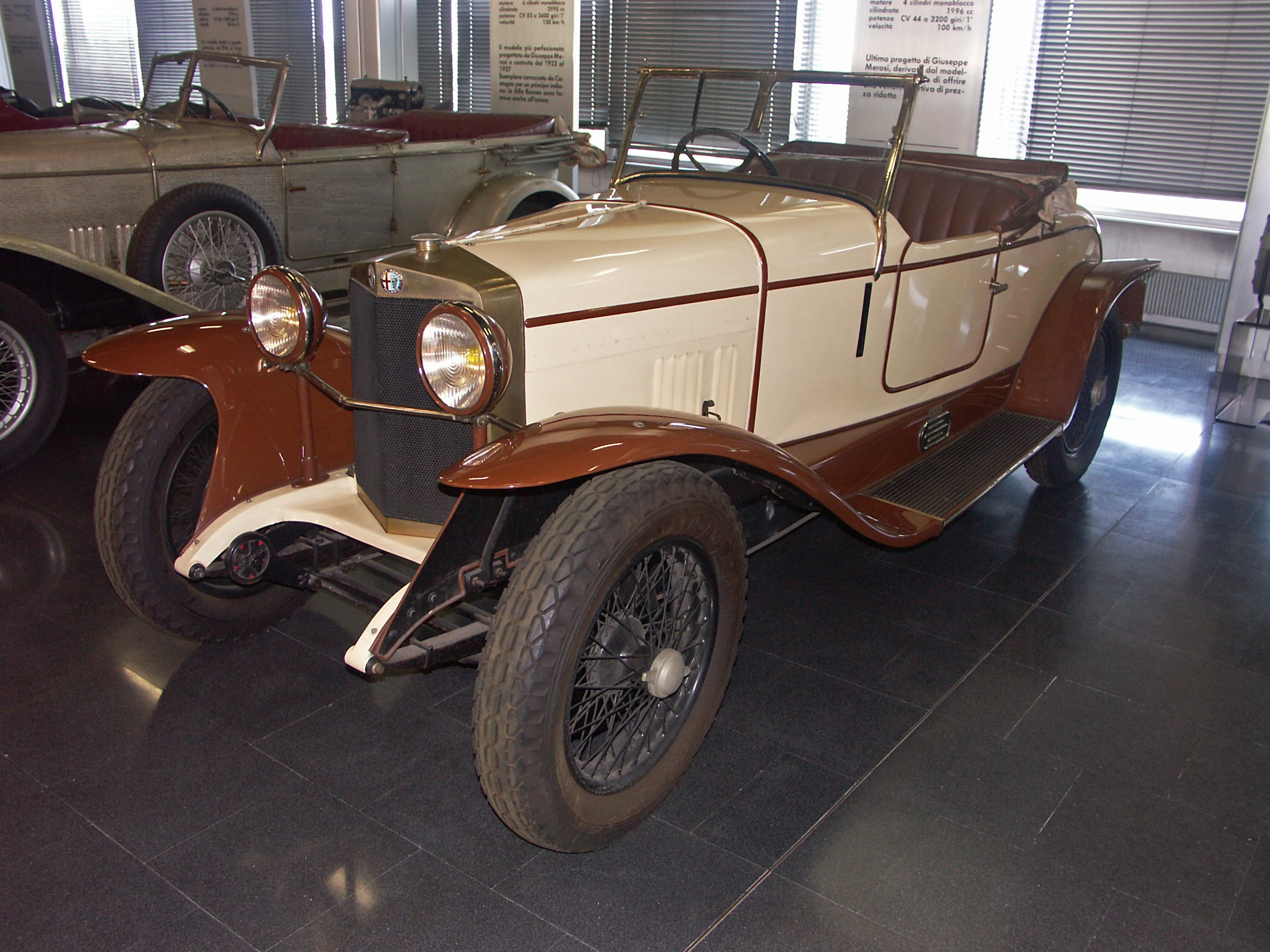
RM Sport Castagna (1924)

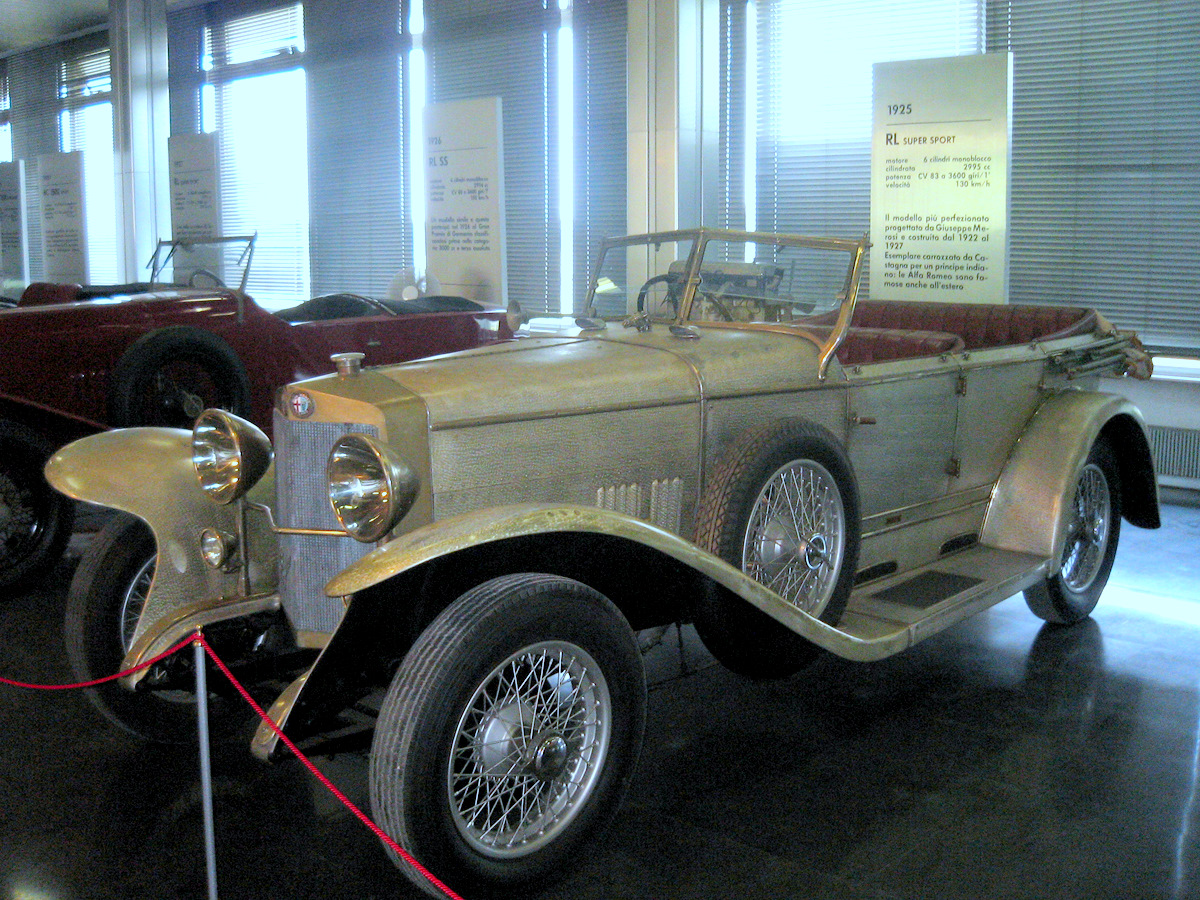
RL SS (1925)

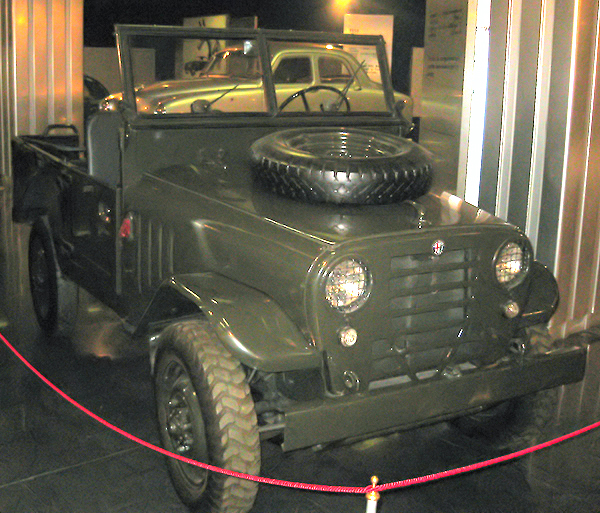
1900 M "Matta" (1951)

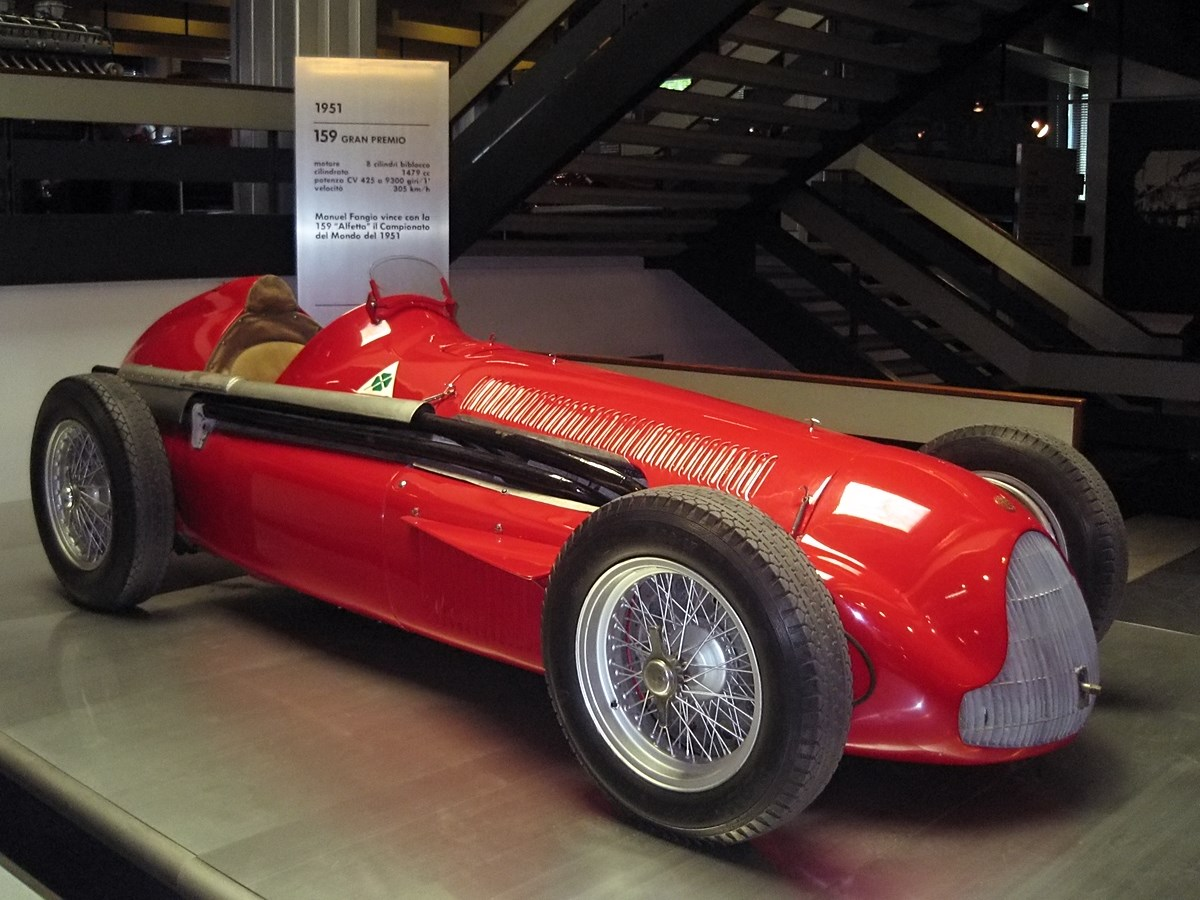
159 (1951)

33/2 Daytona Coupé (1968)

33/2 (1969)

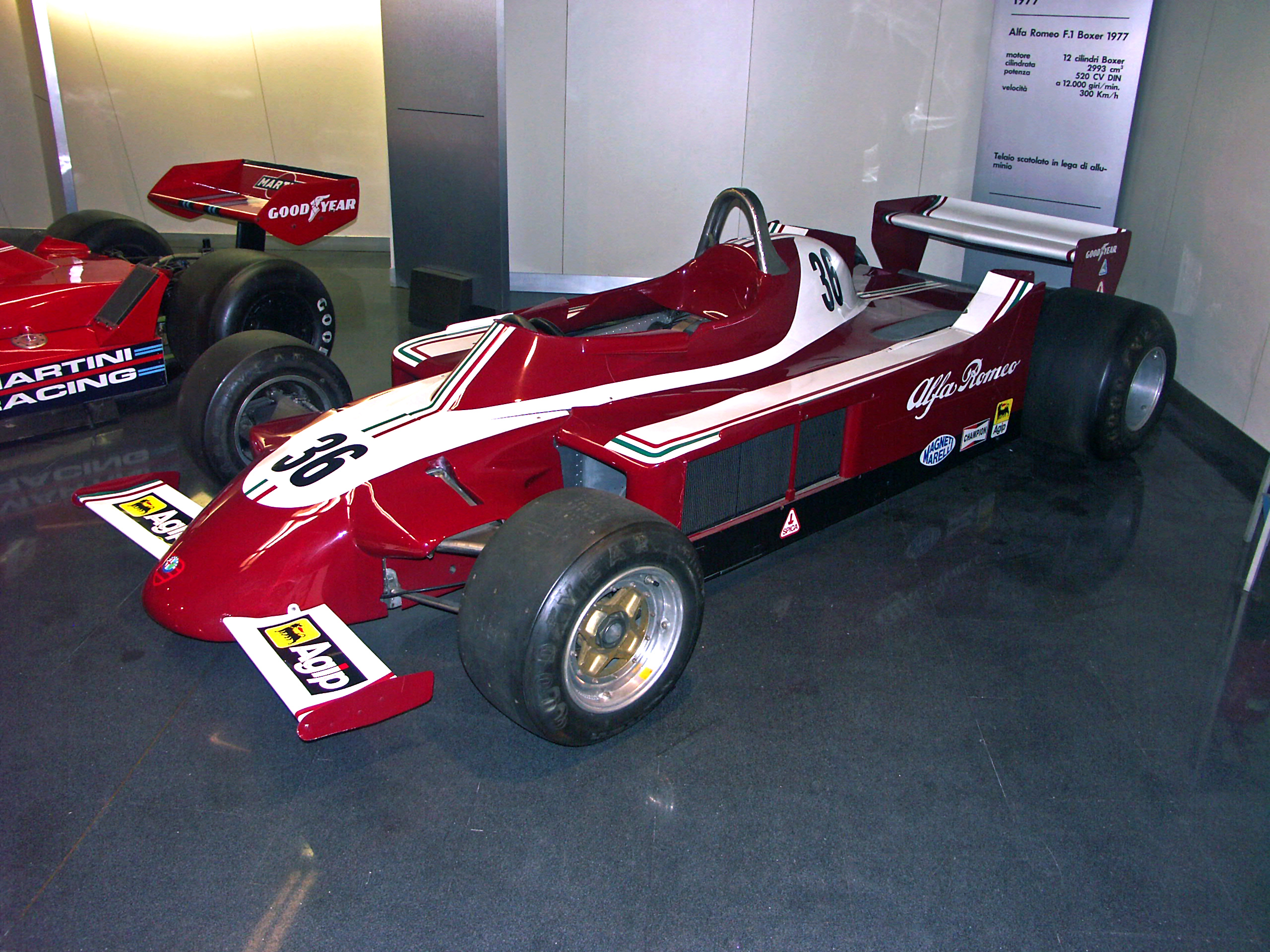
177 (1977)

Nuvola (1996)
Aircraft section

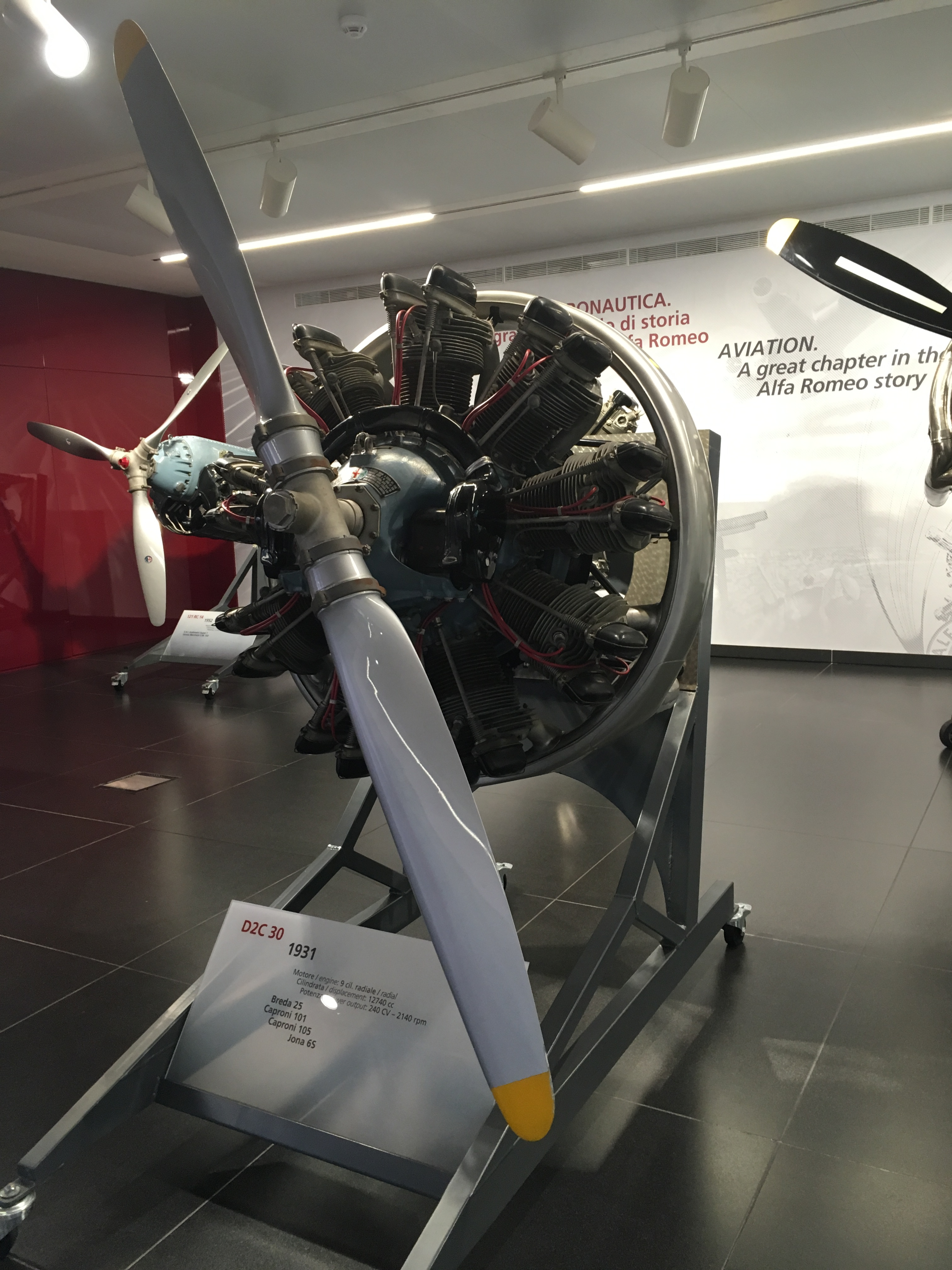
Alfa Romeo D2C supercharged derivative

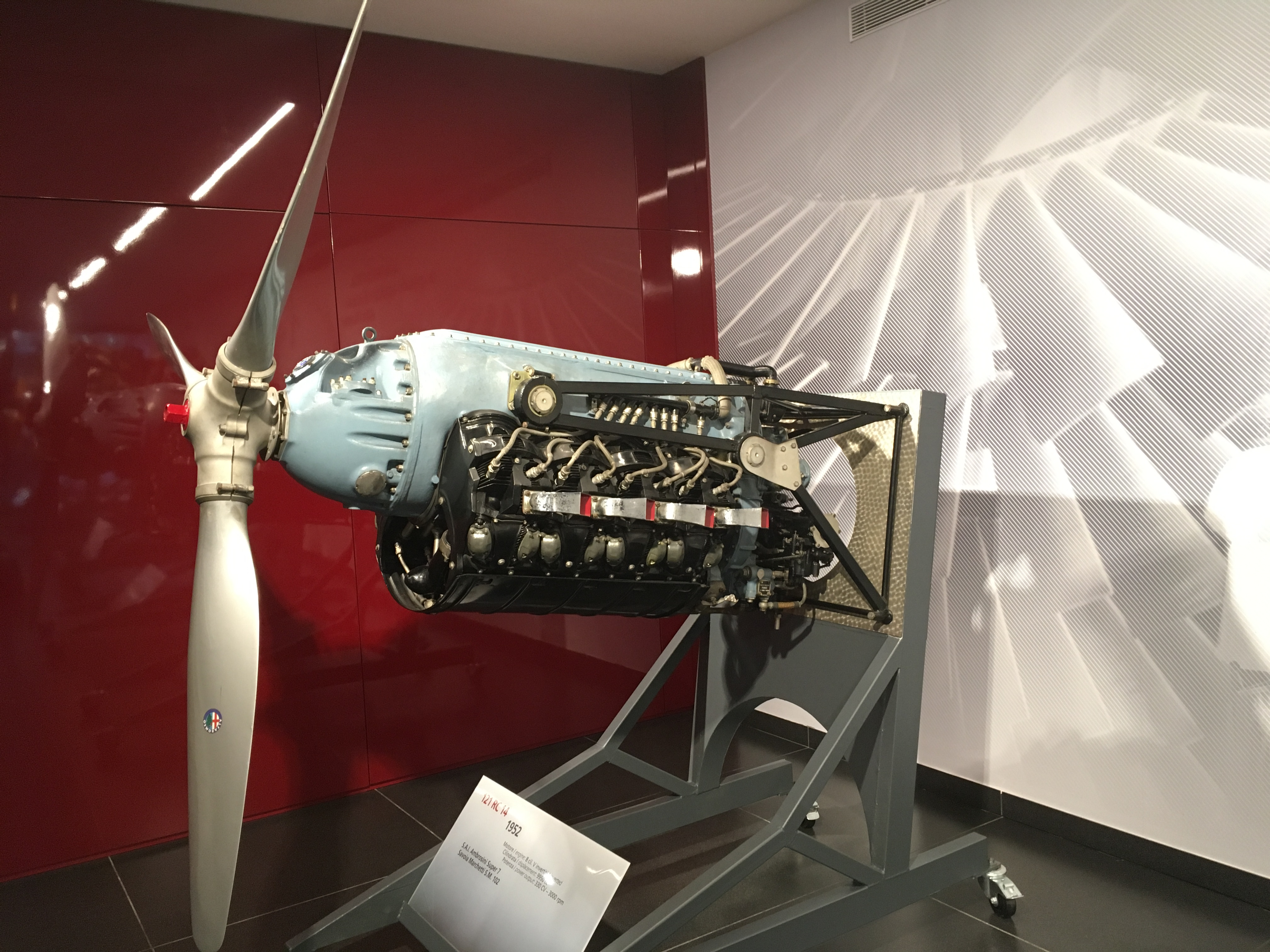
Alfa Romeo 121 RC14

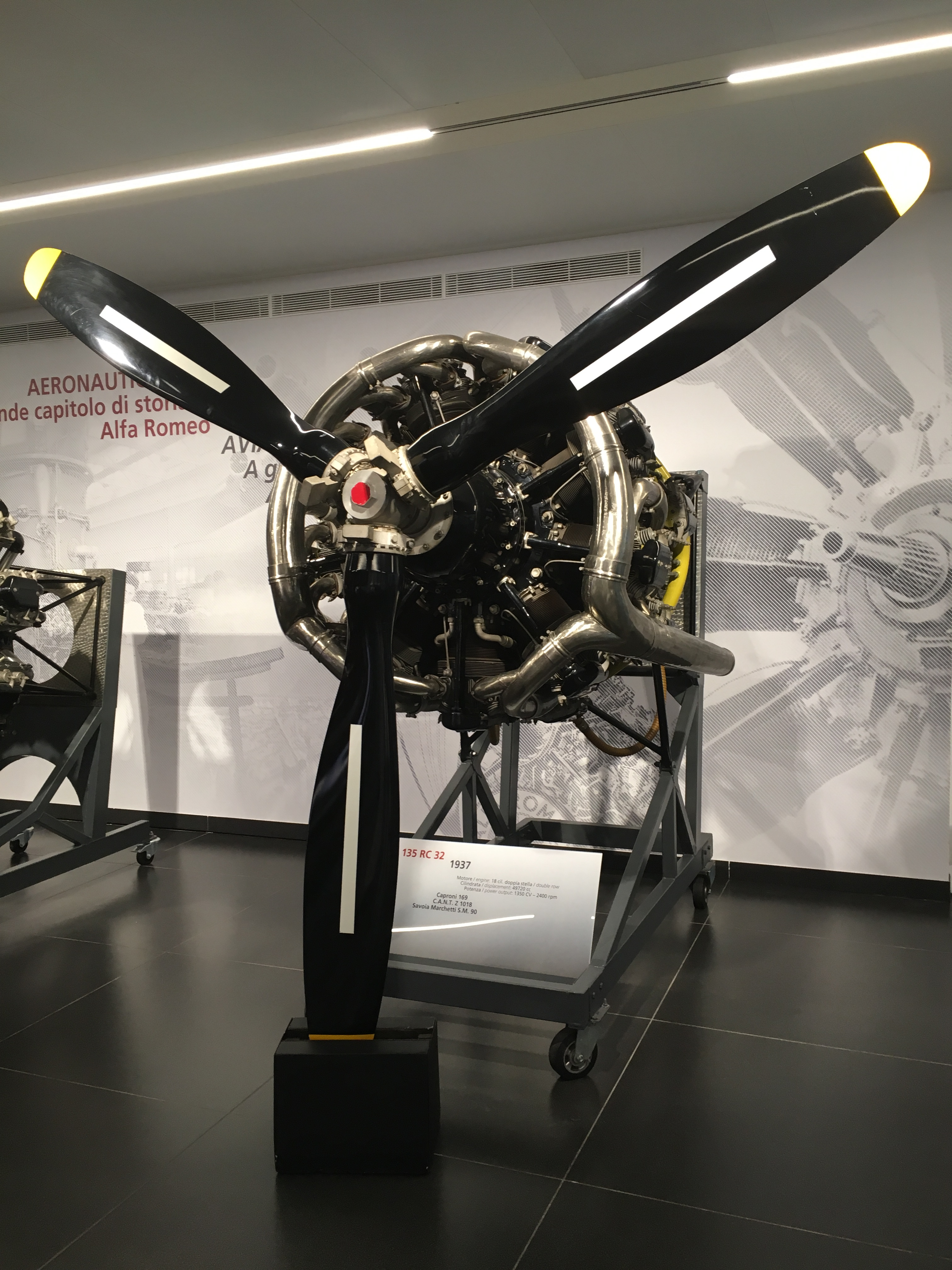
Alfa Romeo 135 RC32 1937
