= ALFA Grand Prix =

ALFA 40/60 GP
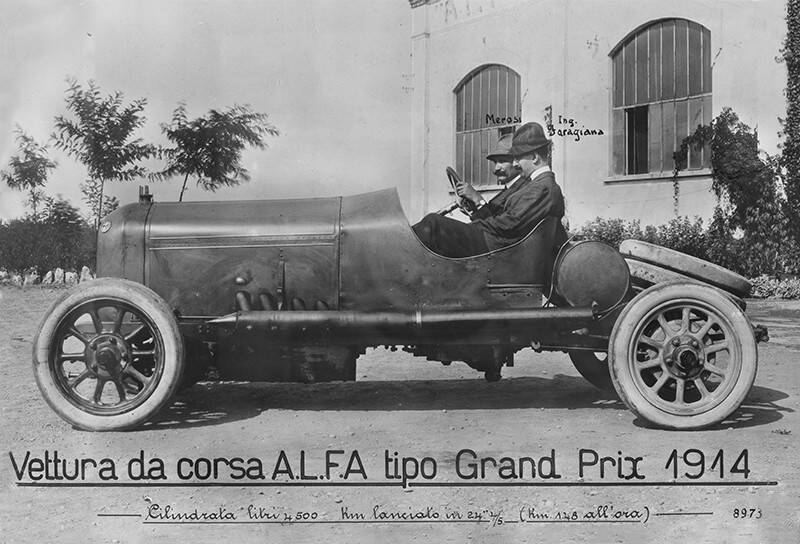
- Baragiana and Giuseppe Merosi in the 1921 version

Overview
- Manufacturer: A.L.F.A. (1914); Alfa Romeo (1920-1921)
- Also called: ALFA GP
- Production: 1914 and 1920-1921
- Assembly: Milan, Italy
- Designer: Giuseppe Merosi

Body and chassis
- Class: Racing car
- Body style: 2-seater Open-wheeler
- Layout: FR Layout
- Related: ALFA 40/60 HP

Powertrain
- Engine: 4,490 cc (274.0 cu in; 4.5 L) straight four Twin Overhead cam
- Capacity: 2-Door
- Power output: 88–102 hp (89–103 PS; 66–76 kW) @ 2,750-3,000 rpm 145–163 lb⋅ft (196.6–221.0 N⋅m) @ 1,500-2,200 rpm
- Transmission: 4-speed Chain drive Manual

Dimensions
- Wheelbase: 2,950 mm (116.1 in)
- Length: 3,200 mm (126.0 in)
- Width: 1,900 mm (74.8 in)
- Height: 1,633 mm (64.3 in)
- Curb weight: 870 kg (1,918.0 lb)

Chronology
- Successor: ALFA 40/60 HP

ALFA 40/60 GP or GP (Grand Prix) was a fully working early racing car prototype made by the company now called Alfa Romeo. Only one example was built in 1914, which was later modified in 1921. This was the creation of Giuseppe Merosi and was the first Alfa Romeo DOHC engine. It had four valves per cylinder, 90 degree valve angle and twin spark ignition. Usually Alfa Romeo DOHC engines are thought to be Vittorio Jano's creations but the first one was Merosi's GP car. This kind of engine architecture was very new for the time, originating from 1912/1913 Peugeot designed by Swiss engineer Ernest Henry. The history of this engine architecture is unclear, but other cars with dual overhead camshafts were made by Sunbeam, Delage and Humber. This 1914 GP car was intended to take part in the French Grand Prix of that year, but for reasons unknown this never happened. In 1921 Giuseppe Campari took part in the Gentlemen G.P. in Brescia with the modified GP car, but was forced to retire due to a leaking radiator.

The GP engine had a displacement of 4.5 litres (4490 cc) and produced 88 bhp (66 kW) at 2950 rpm and after modifications in 1921 102 bhp (76 kW) at 3000 rpm. The top speed of this car was 88–93 mph (142–150 km/h). It was not until the 1920s when these DOHC engines came to Alfa road cars like the Alfa Romeo 6C.
