= Castagna Imperial Landaulet =

Motor vehicle

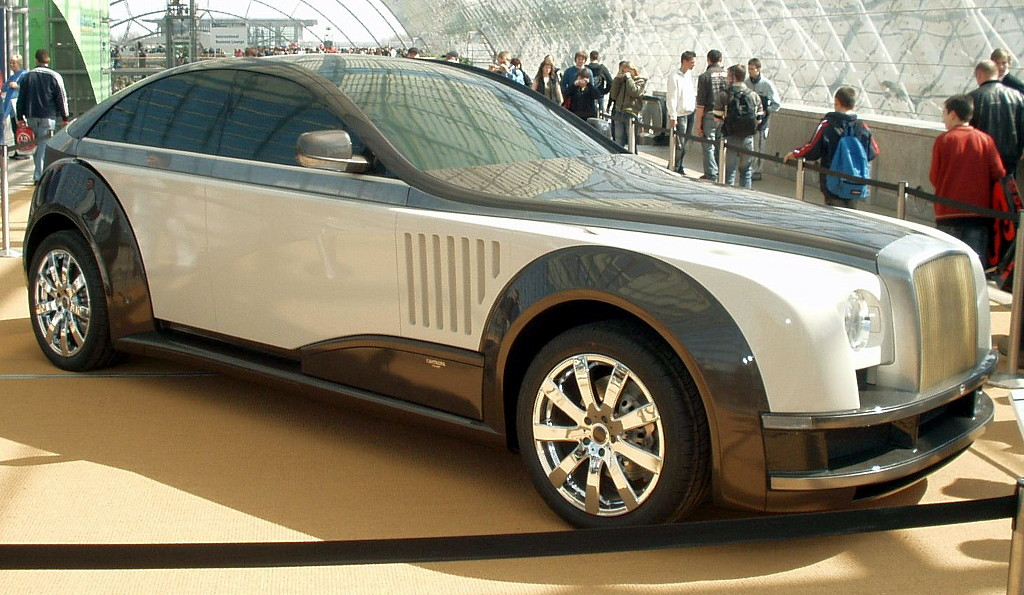
Carrozzeria Castagna Imperial Landaulet

The Castagna Imperial Landaulet is a four-wheel drive luxury sports coupe by the Carrozzeria Castagna design firm, now known for their MINI concepts and conversions and known in the past for the Isotta Fraschini.

The Castagna Imperial Landaulet was shown at the 2006 Geneva Motor Show as a concept car and was inspired by a model invented by Castagna in the Thirties. The car is 163 centimetres (64.2 in) in height and features 'scissor doors' with no central column with a running board that acts as a footrest.
