= Alfa Romeo RL =

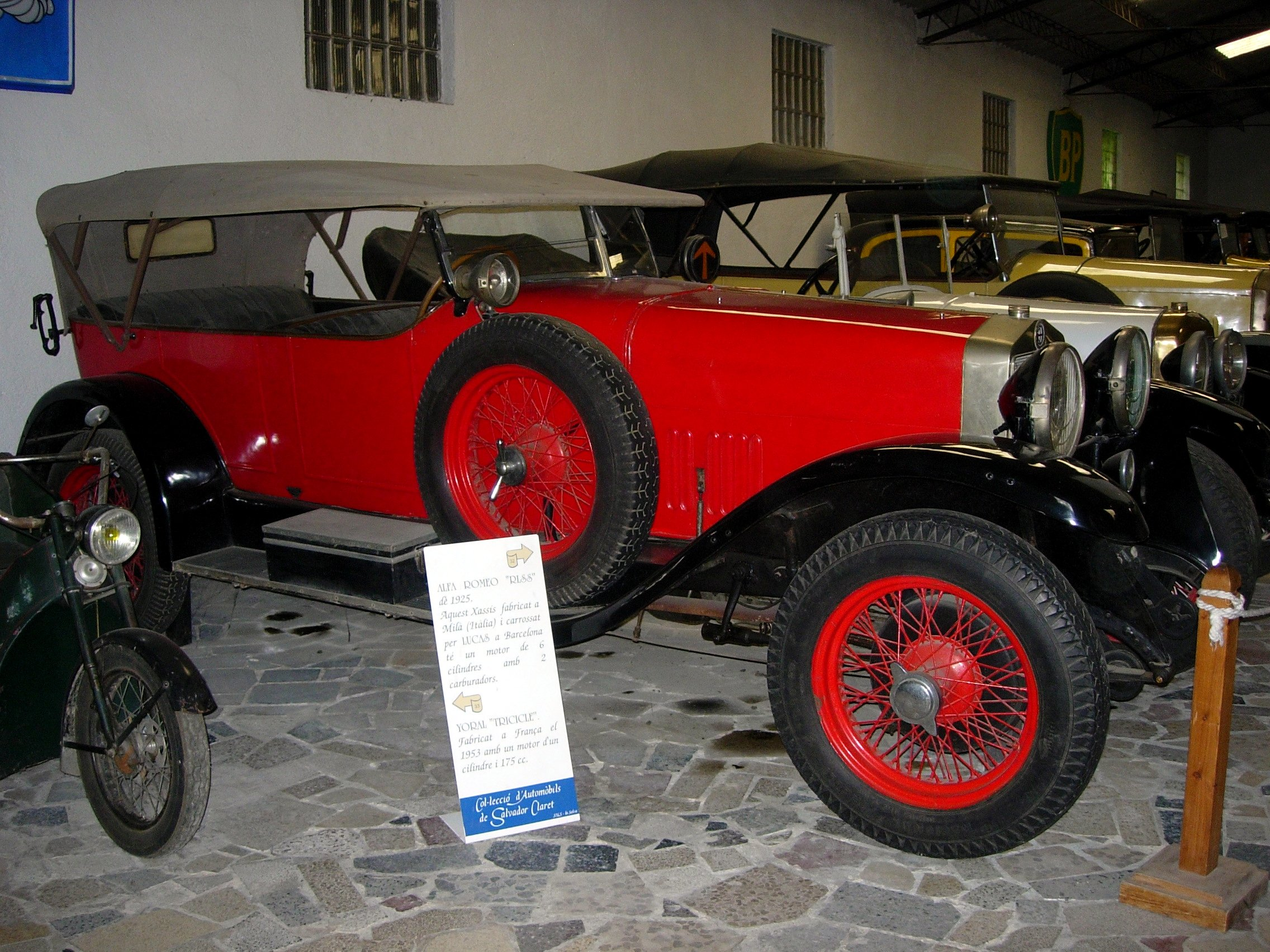
- Alfa Romeo RLSS (1925) with Lucas body from Barcelona

Overview
- Manufacturer: Alfa Romeo
- Production: 1922–1927
- Assembly: Portello, Milan, Italy
- Designer: Giuseppe Merosi

Body and chassis
- Layout: Front-engine, rear-wheel drive
- Related: Alfa Romeo RM

Powertrain
- Engine: 2.9 L I6; 3.0 L I6; 3.2 L I6; 3.6 L I6
- Transmission: 4-speed manual

Dimensions
- Wheelbase: 3,440 mm (135.4 in); 3,140 mm (123.6 in) (RL Sport/SS); 2,880 mm (113.4 in) (RL T.F.)
- Length: 4,630 mm (182.3 in) Zagato; 4,450 mm (175.2 in) Castagna
- Width: 1,770 mm (69.7 in) Zagato; 1,870 mm (73.6 in) Castagna
- Height: 1,650 mm (65.0 in) Zagato; 1,630 mm (64.2 in) Castagna
- Kerb weight: 1,550 kg (3,417 lb) Zagato; 1,600 kg (3,527 lb) Castagna

Chronology
- Predecessor: Alfa Romeo G1
- Successor: Alfa Romeo 6C 1500

The Alfa Romeo RL was produced between 1922 and 1927. It was Alfa's first sport model after World War I, designed in 1921 by Giuseppe Merosi. It had a straight-6 engine with overhead valves, and came in three different versions: Normale, Turismo and Sport. A total of 2,640 RLs were made.

== Models ==
The RLTF (Targa Florio) was the race version of the RL. It weighed half as much as the standard production models, despite the engine having seven main bearings instead of four and double carburetors. It was used among the 1923 Alfa race team, which had drivers like Ugo Sivocci, Antonio Ascari, Giulio Masetti and Enzo Ferrari. Sivocci's car had a green cloverleaf symbol on a white background; when he won the 1923 Targa Florio, that symbol was to become the Alfa team's good luck token. Five different RLSS were entered in the first Mille Miglia in 1927, but only two completed the race.

A 1925 RLSS version with rare, original bodywork by Thornton Engineering Company in Bradford, UK, is on permanent display in the Targa Florio exhibit at the Simeone Foundation Automotive Museum in Philadelphia, PA, USA. It is one of only 9 RLSS still in existence.

Models
Model	Engine displacement	Max power	Years produced
RL Normale	2916 cc	56 PS (41 kW; 55 hp)	(1922–1925)
RL Turismo	2996 cc	61 PS (45 kW; 60 hp)	(1925–1927)
RL Sport	2996 cc	71 PS (52 kW; 70 hp)	(1922–1927)
RL Super Sport	2996 cc	71 PS (52 kW; 70 hp)	(1922–1927)
RL Super Sport Castagna		84 PS (62 kW; 83 hp)	
RL Super Sport Zagato		89 PS (65 kW; 88 hp)	
RL Targa Florio	3154 cc	95 PS (70 kW; 94 hp)	(1923)
RL Targa Florio	2994 cc	90 PS (66 kW; 89 hp)	(1924)
RL Targa Florio	3620 cc	125 PS (92 kW; 123 hp)	(1924)

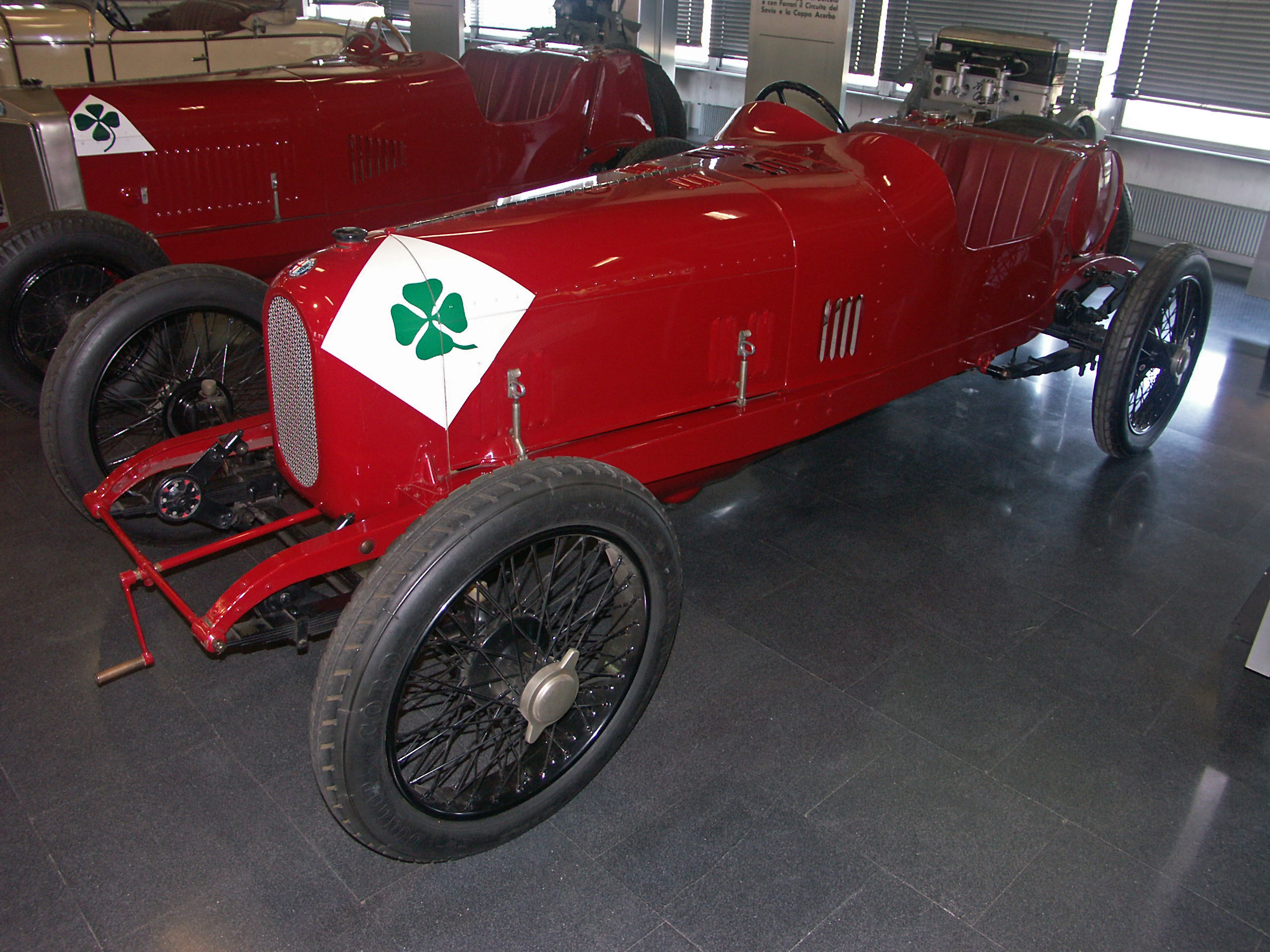
Alfa Romeo RL Targa Florio 1923

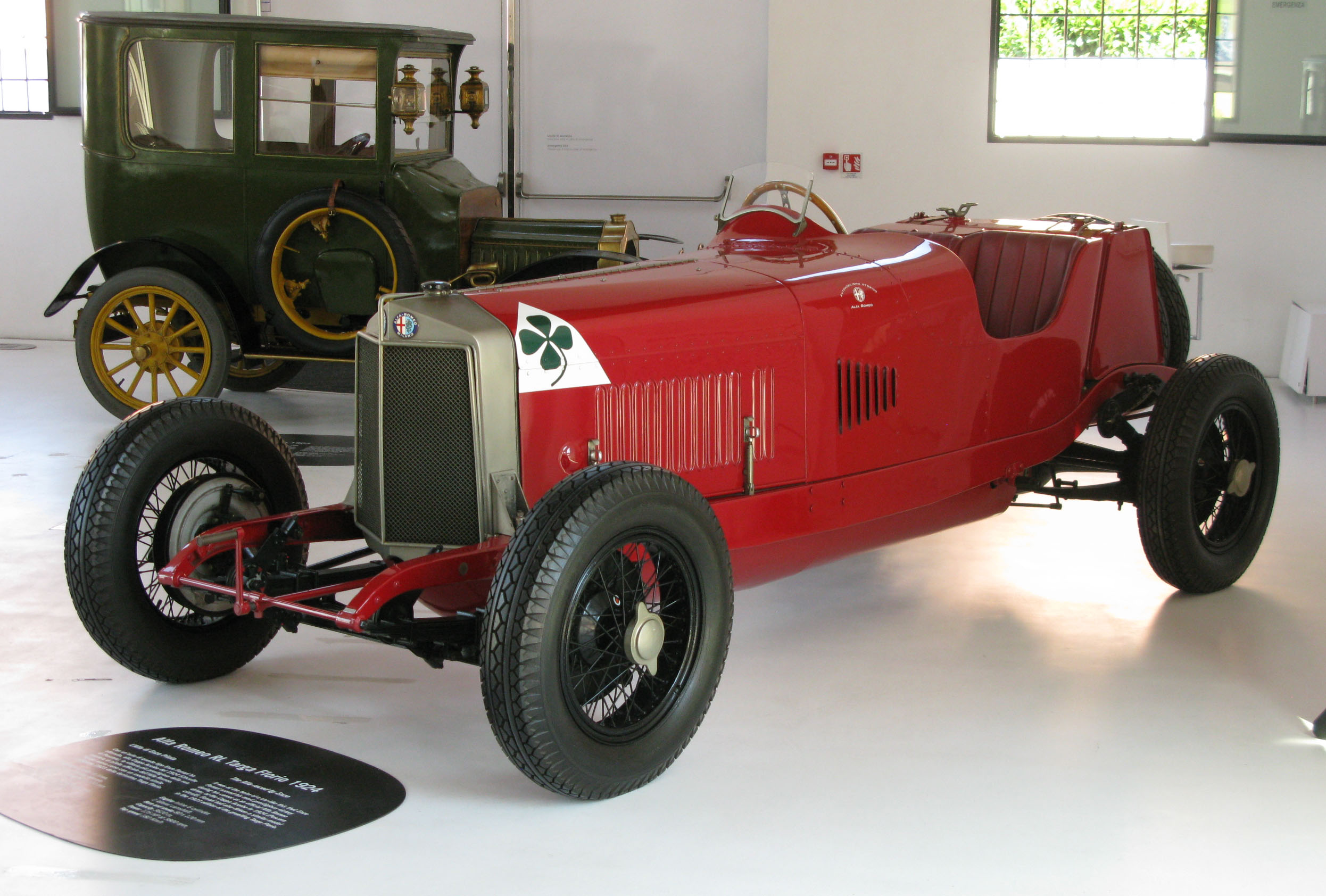
Alfa Romeo RL Targa Florio 1924

Short video clip of 1924 RL Targa Florio

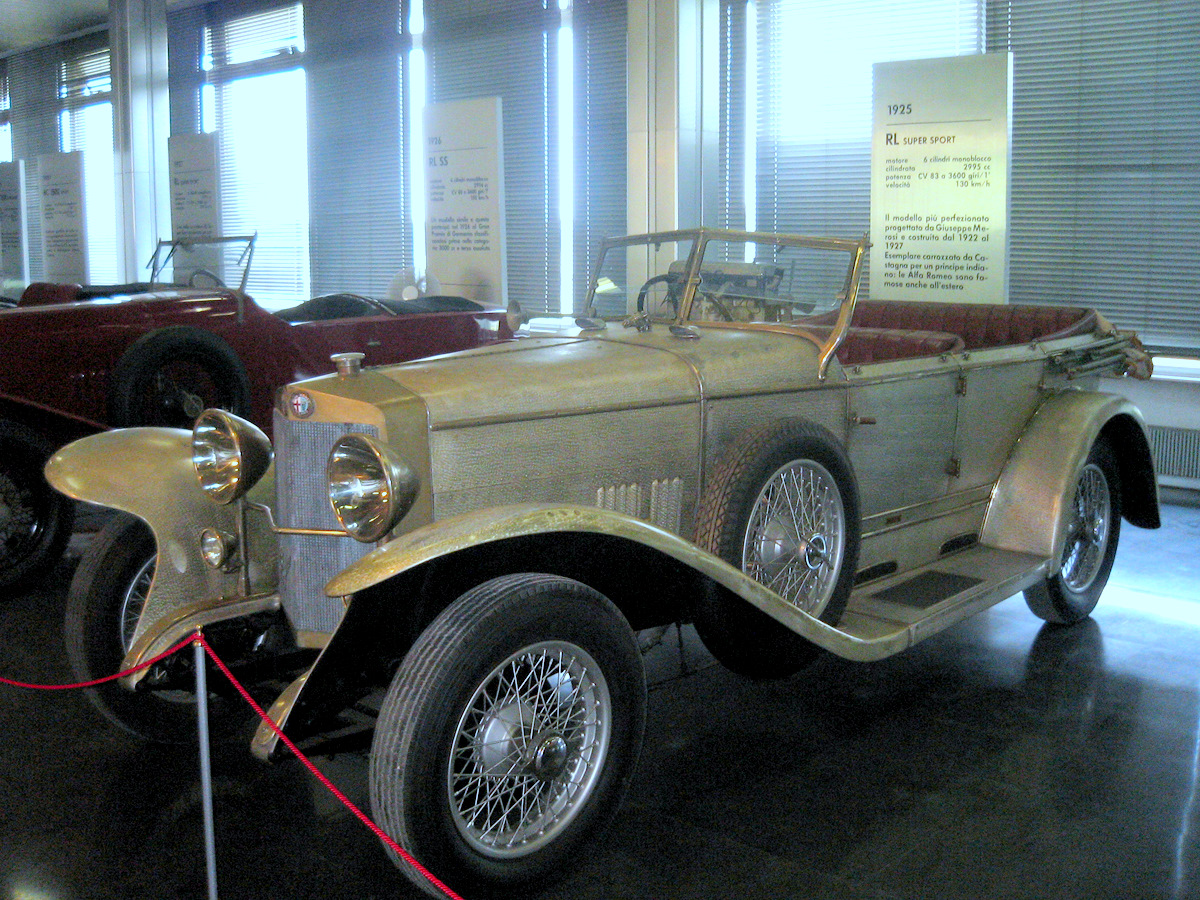
Alfa Romeo RL Super Sport with Castagna brushed aluminium body, ex Sir Sultan Mohammed Shah Aga Khan 3 car.

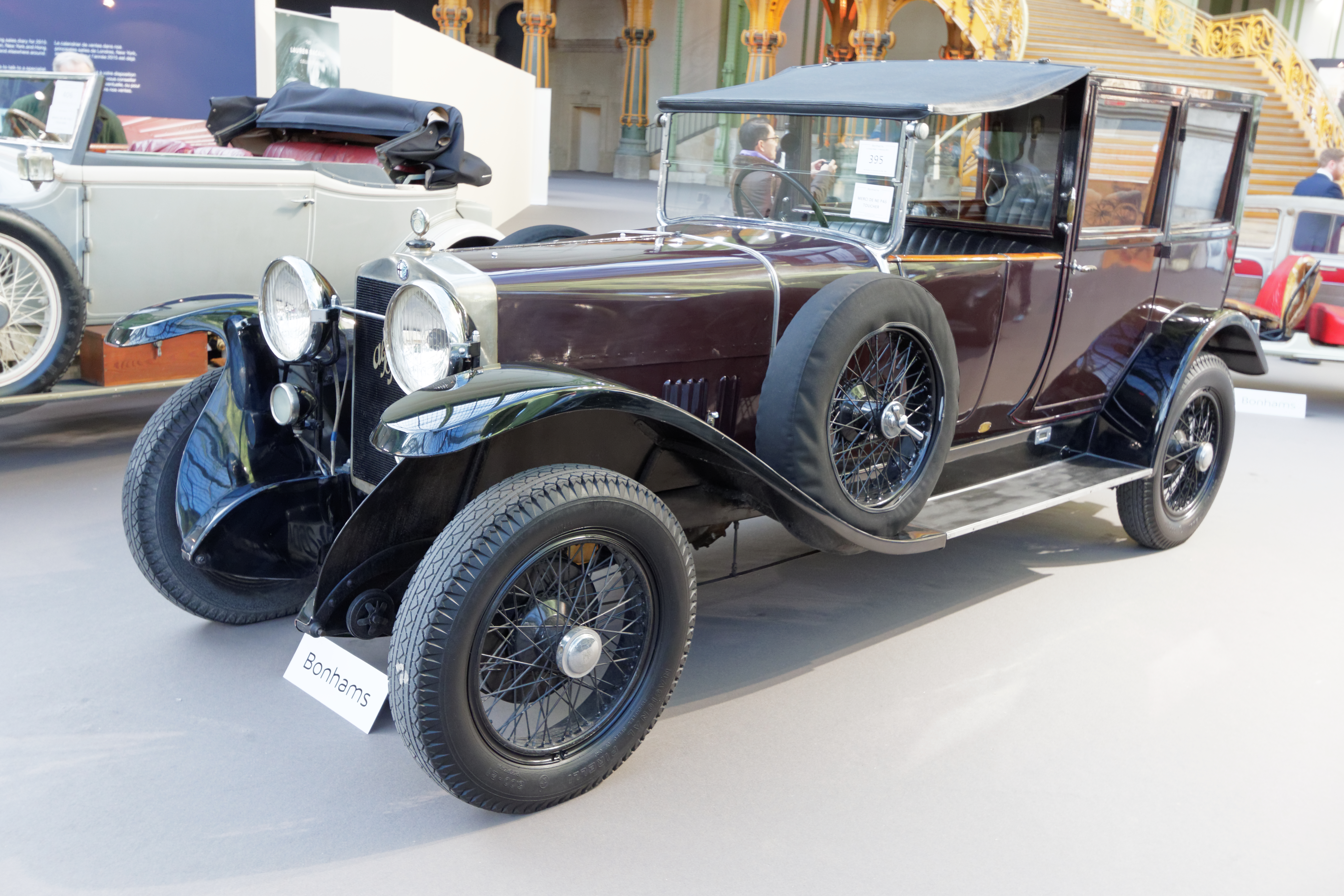
Alfa Romeo RL Normale Limousine de Ville s/n 7946

== Production numbers ==
Alfa Romeo RL, production by model
Year	1922	1923	1924	1925		1926	1927	Total
Series	I, II		III, IV	V	VI	VII		I–VII
RL Normale	3	610	443	259				1,315
RL Turismo					195	126	66	387
RL Sport	3	215	176	143				537
RL Super Sport					304	12	76	392
Total	6	825	619	901		138	142	2,631
