= Alfa Romeo G1 =

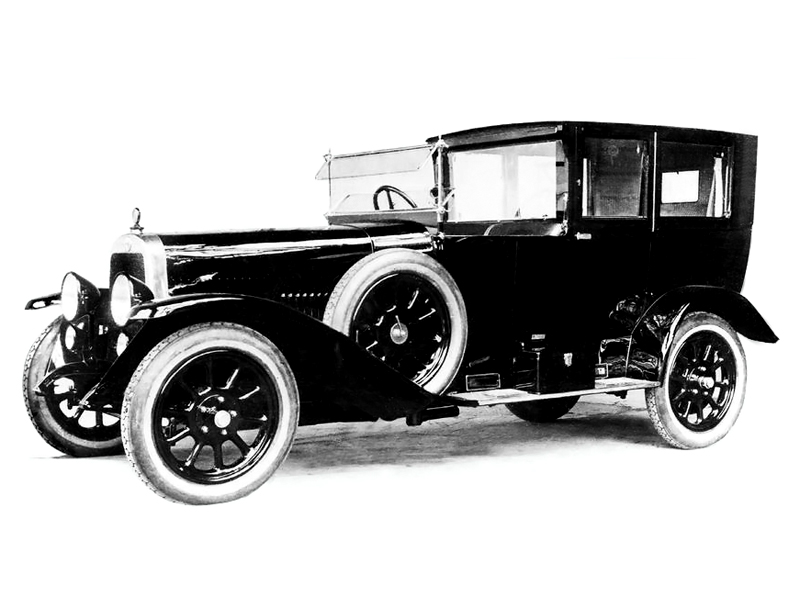

Overview
- Manufacturer: Alfa Romeo
- Production: 1921–1923
- Assembly: Portello, Milan, Italy
- Designer: Giuseppe Merosi

Body and chassis
- Class: Luxury car
- Body style: Limousine
- Layout: FR layout

Powertrain
- Engine: 6,330 cc sidevalve I6
- Transmission: 4-speed manual with reverse gear

Dimensions
- Wheelbase: 3,400 mm (130 in)
- Length: 4,494 mm (176.9 in)
- Curb weight: 1500 kg (3306 lbs)

Chronology
- Predecessor: A.L.F.A 40/60 HP
- Successor: Alfa Romeo RL

The Alfa Romeo G1 (1921–23) was an Italian automobile.

It was the first all-new design from Alfa Romeo after the end of the A.L.F.A. brand. The car was designed by A.L.F.A. pioneer Giuseppe Merosi as the factory's new luxury vehicle while he simultaneously revised the prewar 24HP racing car into the 20/30ES model. At this time, he was engaged in a legal dispute with Nicola Romeo regarding the brand takeover conditions.

The chassis was lengthened and stiffened from the 1914 A.L.F.A. 40-60 HP model, entering into market territory competition with Rolls-Royce. A new 6.3 L (384 cu in) straight-6 engine was introduced, producing 70 PS (51 kW) and 216 lb⋅ft (293 N⋅m) of torque. The G1 achieved a maximum speed of 86 miles per hour (138 km/h), winning its production class at the Coppa del Garda race.

Total production was 52 cars. It found no customers in Italy, and all 50 production model (excepting two prototypes) found their way to Australia. Chassis numbers 6001 and 6002 were built in 1920 as prototypes, whereas 6003 to 6052 were built mostly in 1921. Only one known survivor exists as of 2019, chassis number 6018. It was in 2007 owned by New Zealand's Alfa importer and is also the oldest surviving Alfa Romeo-branded car.

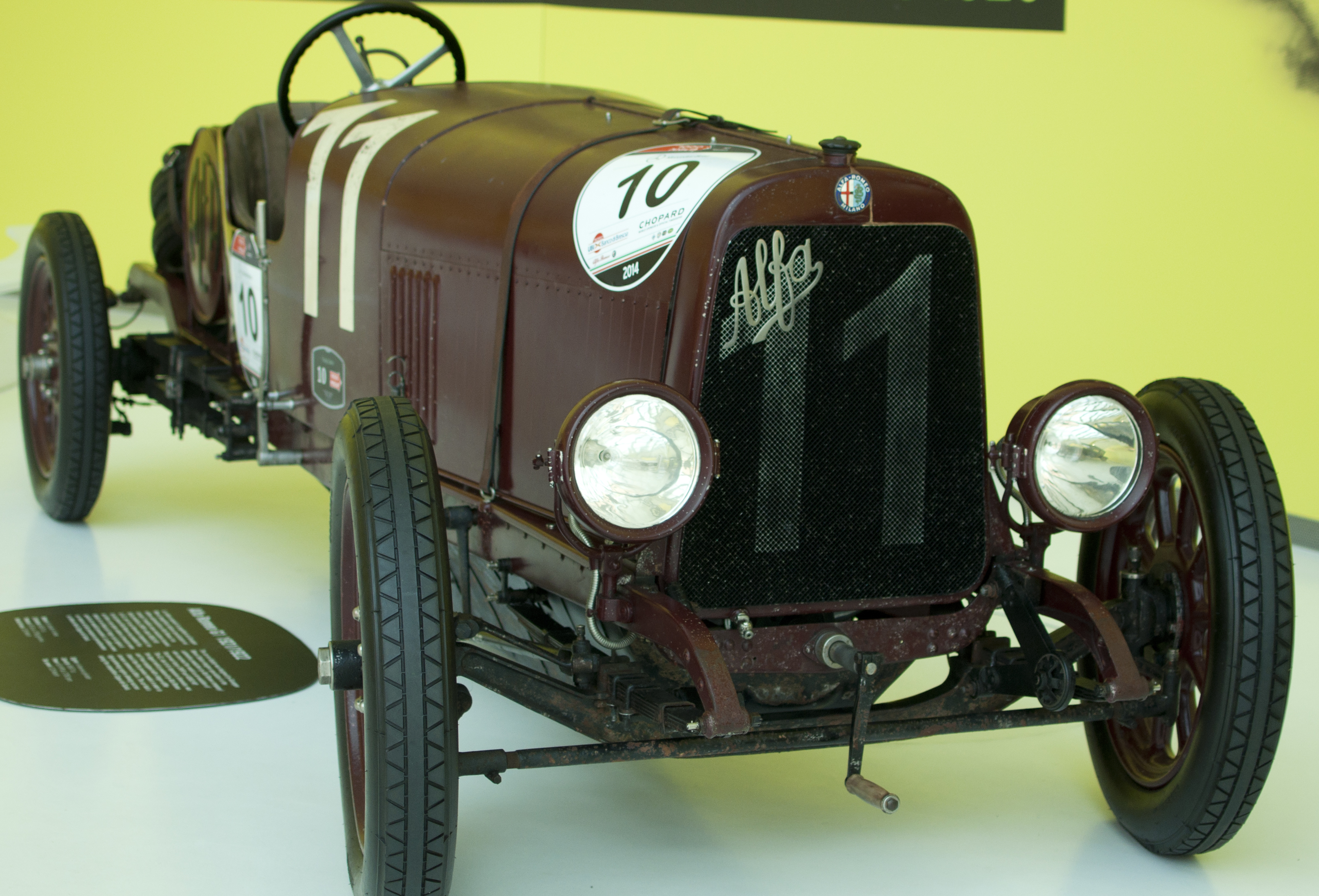
Chassis number 6018 is possibly the only remaining G1. It was auctioned for US$445,000 in 2018, after having been rebuilt from its original form into a tipo corsa racing car.

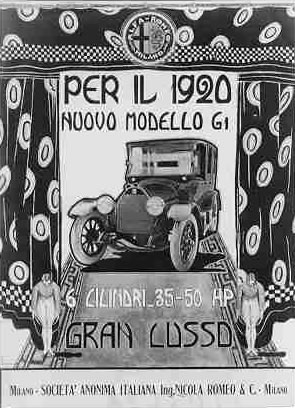
1920 Alfa Romeo G1 advertisement: Per il 1920 nuovo modello G1 6 cilindri 35-50 HP Gran Lusso. Milano–Società anonima Ing. Nicola Romeo & Co–Milano
