= ALFA 40/60 HP =

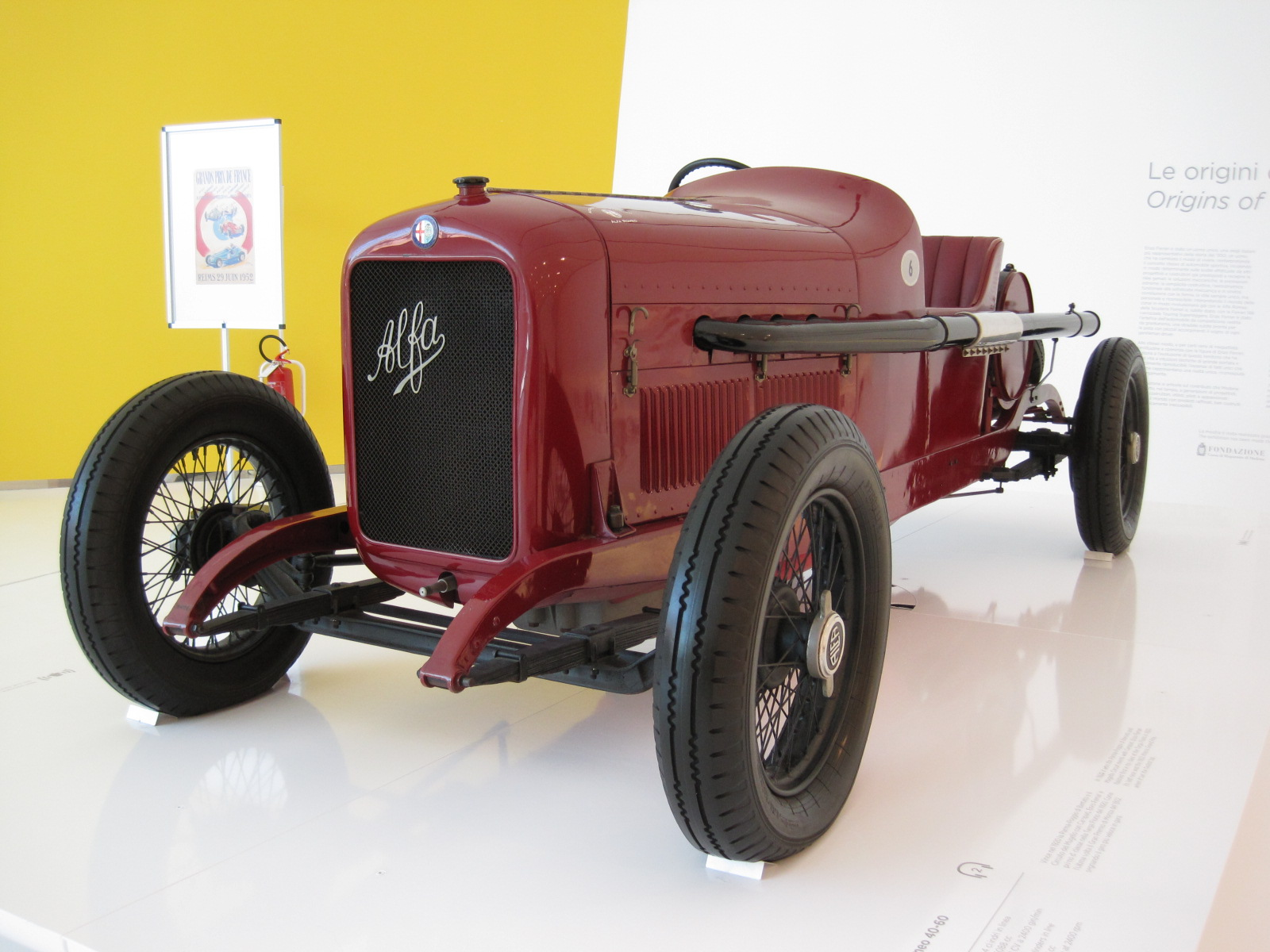
- 1921 ALFA 40/60 HP tipo corsa

Overview
- Manufacturer: ALFA
- Production: 1913–1922; 27 made
- Assembly: Portello, Milan, Italy

Body and chassis
- Body style: Torpedo; Spider (tipo corsa)
- Layout: Front-engine, rear-wheel drive

Powertrain
- Engine: 6,082 cc I4
- Transmission: 4-speed manual

Dimensions
- Wheelbase: 3,200 mm (126.0 in); 2,950 mm (116.1 in) (tipo corsa)
- Kerb weight: 1,250 kg (2,756 lb); 1,100 kg (2,425 lb) (tipo corsa)

Chronology
- Successor: Alfa Romeo G1

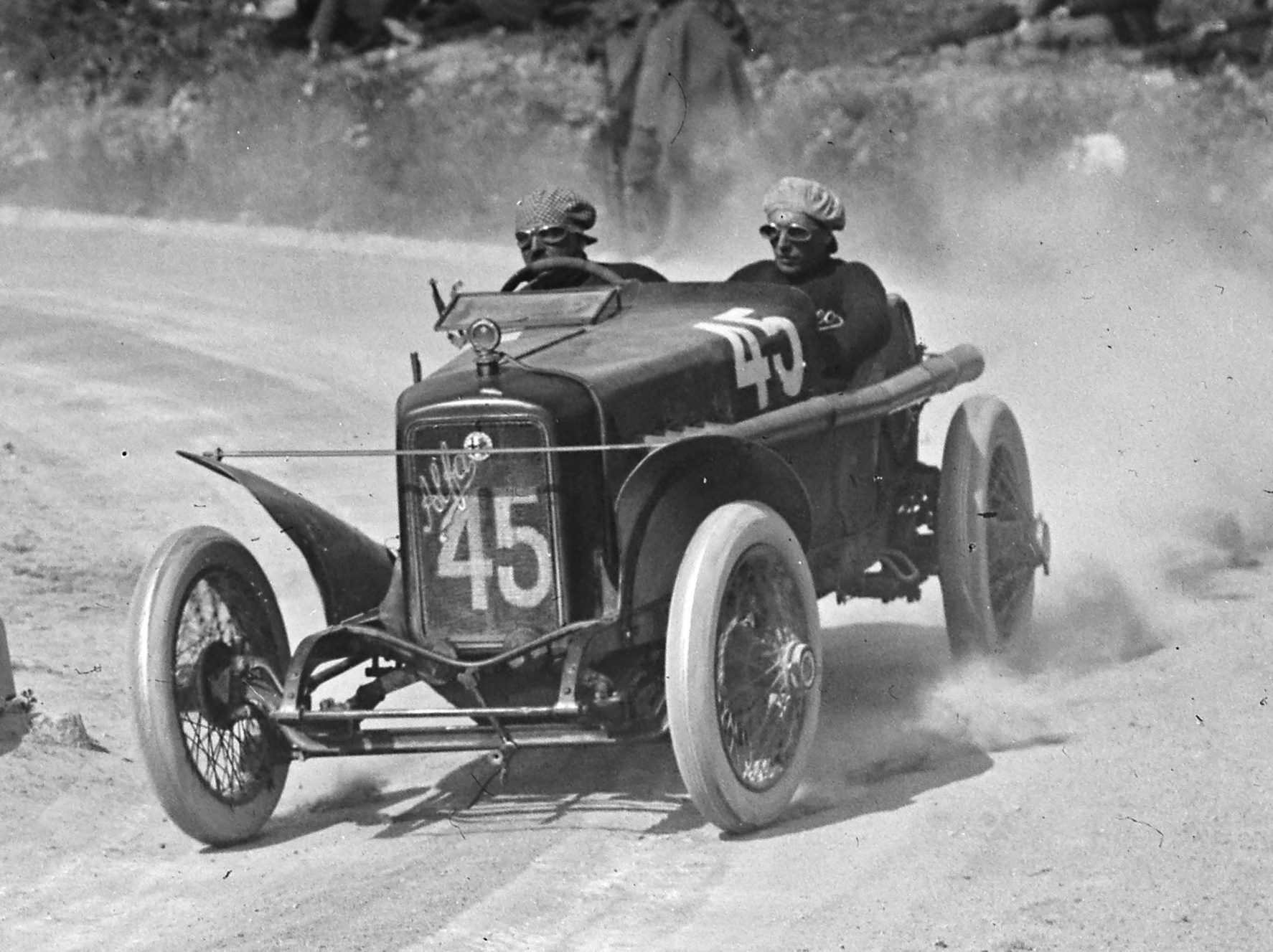
Giuseppe Campari in his Alfa Romeo 40-60 HP at the 1922 Targa Florio

The ALFA 40/60 HP is a road car and race car made by Italian car manufacturer ALFA (later to become Alfa Romeo). This model was made between 1913 and 1922 and was designed by Giuseppe Merosi, as were all other Alfas at that time. The 40/60 HP has a 6082 cc straight-four engine with overhead valves, which produced 70 PS (51 kW) and its top speed was 125 km/h (78 mph). The 40-60 HP Corsa racing version had 73 PS (54 kW) and a top speed of 137 km/h (85 mph), and it also won its own category in the Parma-Berceto race.

40/60 HP production and development was interrupted by the First World War, but resumed briefly afterwards. The 40-60 HP Corsa now had 82 PS (60 kW) and a top speed of around 150 km/h (93 mph). Giuseppe Campari won the 1920 and 1921 races at Mugello with this car.

== Specifications ==
The 40-60 HP was based on a ladder chassis of C-shaped stamped steel rails.

Its engine was a 6,082 cc or 371 cu in (bore and stroke 110 x 160 mm, compression ratio 4.35:1) overhead valve inline-four cylinder, fed by a single vertical carburettor. The en bloc cylinder block and cylinder head were split in two groups of two cylinders, and made of cast iron; the crankcase was cast aluminium, incorporating the four engine mountings. The two in-block camshafts were driven by a gear train located at the front of the engine.

The driveline comprised a dry multi-plate clutch, a four-speed gearbox and a one-piece propeller shaft, spinning inside a tube attached to the rear differential housing. At its open end, towards the gearbox, this tube forked out into two ends which, linked to the chassis, located the rear axle. The gearbox was positioned towards the middle of the chassis, almost underneath the driver, rather than in block with the engine—to which it was connected by a short prop shaft. Front and rear solid axles were sprung on longitudinal semi-elliptic leaf springs. Brakes were drums on the rear wheels, with both pedal and hand controls. The wheels were 5.5x19" Sankey-type pressed steel.

=== 40-60 HP tipo corsa ===
The tipo corsa sat on a shortened wheelbase of 2,950 mm (116.1 in), instead of the road car's 3,200 mm (126.0 in). Kerb weight was 1,100 kg (2,425 lb) versus 1,250 kg (2,756 lb). The racing-prepared engine was fitted with two carburettors and had a 5.50:1 compression ratio. It produced 73 PS (54 kW) at 2,000 rpm; after the war, for the 1920–22 races, it was brought to 82 PS (60 kW) at 2,400 rpm. Top speed was 150 km/h (93 mph). The final drive ratio was 18/49 instead of the standard 17/49. The Sankey steel wheels were replaced by 6.0x20" knock-off wire wheels. Fuel tank capacity was expanded from the standard 70 L (15 imp gal; 18 US gal) to 120 L (26 imp gal; 32 US gal).

== 40/60 HP Aerodynamica ==
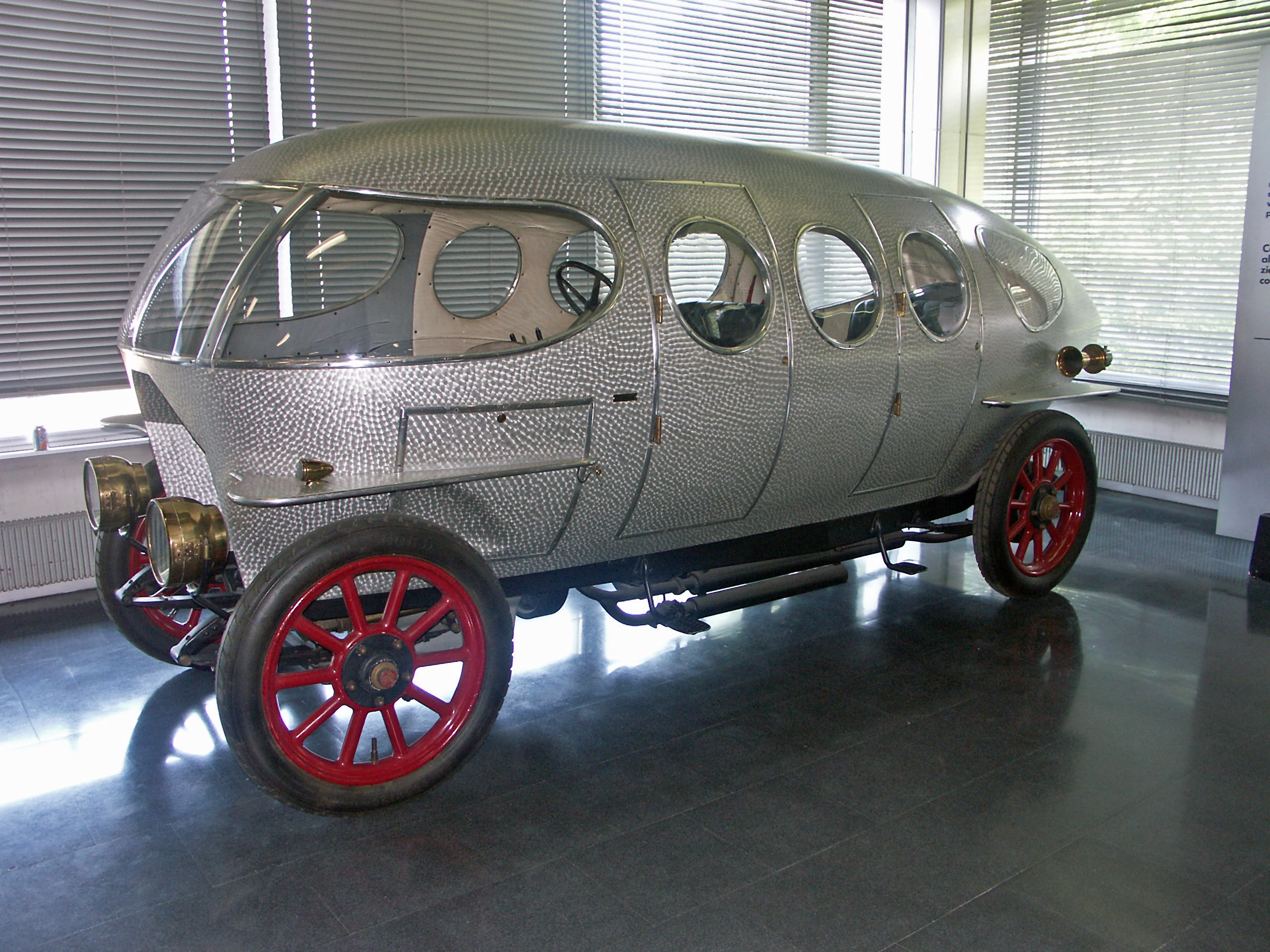
ALFA 40-60 HP Castagna Aerodinamica prototype

In 1914 the milanese count Marco Ricotti commissioned to Carrozzeria Castagna the ALFA 40/60 HP Aerodinamica (also known as "Siluro Ricotti"), a prototype model which could reach 139 km/h (86 mph) top speed. A replica of that car was created in the 1970s, and now it is shown in the Alfa Romeo Historical Museum.
