= Giuseppe Merosi =

Italian automotive engineer (1872–1956)

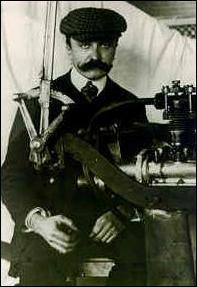
Giuseppe Merosi, Milan, 1906

Giuseppe Merosi (8 December 1872 – 27 March 1956) was an Italian automobile engineer and designer.

Born in Piacenza, Merosi worked as a building surveyor, before he decided to explore his gift for automotive engineering. He first earned experiences at Bianchi and then at Fiat. In 1910 he was hired as chief engineer to the new company A.L.F.A which was established at Portello in Milan, later to become Alfa Romeo when the company stopped buying manufactured licensed products from the French automaker Automobiles Darracq France.

The first Alfa designed by Merosi was A.L.F.A 24 HP, which came on the market on 24 June 1910. The 4.1 litres capacity engine supplied 42 hp and the cars reached 100 km/h (62 mph), at that time a very considerable maximum speed. After little more than one year, Alfa had already sold 50 models. The car proved to be durable and reliable, and was conspicuous for its elegant design. Higher HP models followed in the coming years. In 1914 Merosi designed the first Alfa Romeo DOHC engine, 4 cylinders, 4.5 litres and 16 valve head, this was used in the 1914 Alfa Romeo Grand Prix car driven by Giuseppe Campari. World War I temporarily stopped Alfa's activities and Merosi could start working again with DOHC engine only in 1922. In the early 1920s he also worked on the deluxe Alfa Romeo G1.

Merosi was one of the first people at Alfa to recognize the importance of producing racing cars, both in terms of technical development and marketing. His Alfa Romeo HP had already taken part in the 1911 edition of Targa Florio. In 1920 Alfa Romeo started producing proper racing cars with the RL and RM as well as the P1. Alfa Romeo would win the Targa Florio for the first time in 1923 with Ugo Sivocci.

In 1926 Merosi left Alfa Romeo and he was replaced with new chief engineer Vittorio Jano. He worked afterwards for Isotta Fraschini until he retired when the company suspended its activity following the outbreak of World War II. Merosi died in Piacenza at the age of 84 in 1956.
