= Carrozzeria Castagna =

Italian coachbuilding company

Carrozzeria Castagna S.r.l.
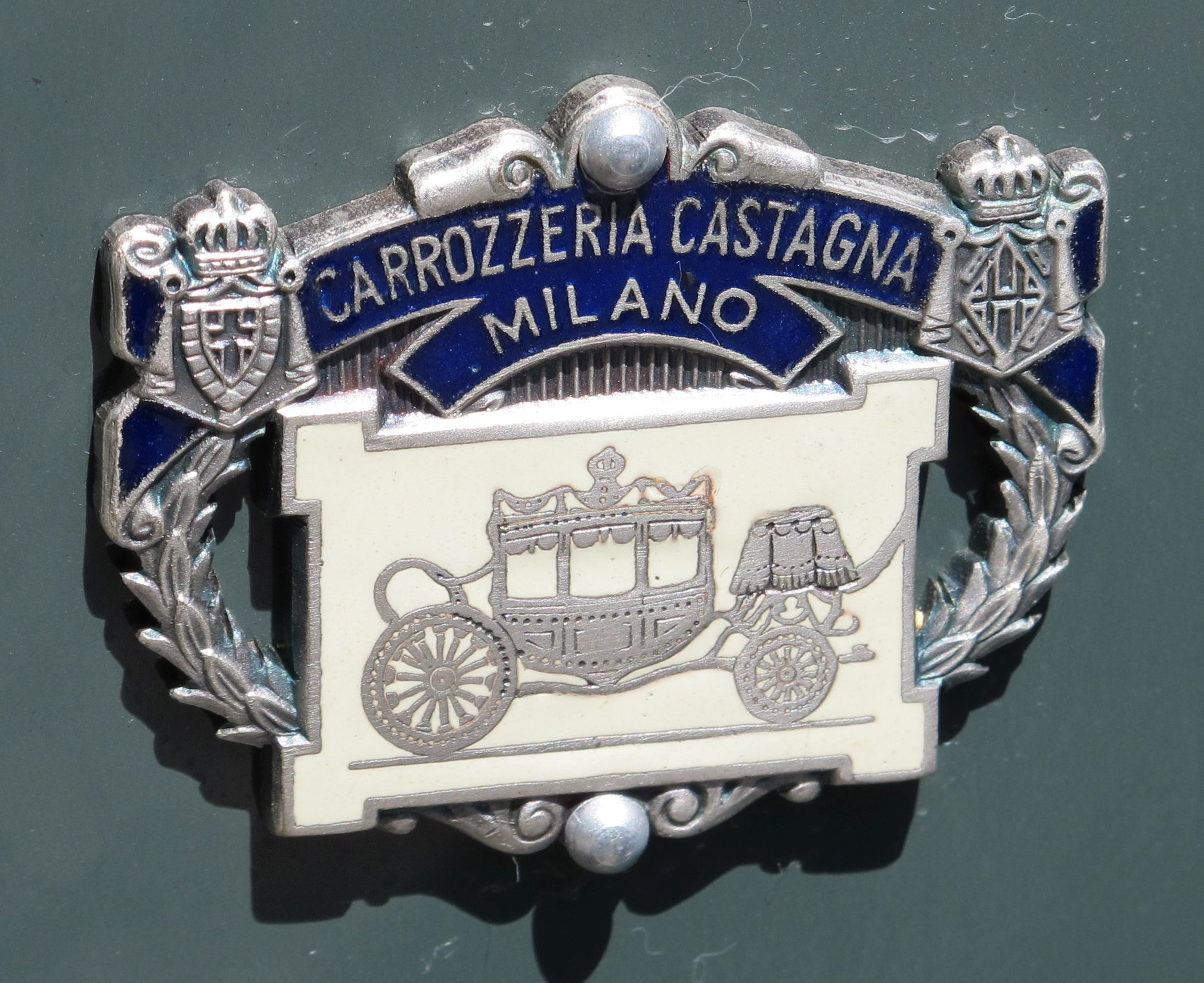
- Company type: Società a responsabilità limitata
- Industry: Automotive
- Founded: Milan, Kingdom of Lombardy–Venetia (1849)
- Founder: Carlo Castagna
- Headquarters: Milan, Italy
- Key people: Uberto Petra (co-owner) Gioacchino Acampora (chief designer & co-owner)
- Services: custom-built vehicles
- Website: carrozzeriacastagna.it

Carrozzeria Castagna is an Italian coachbuilding company based in Milan, Italy.

== History ==
Sources provide very different information about the company's origins. Some internet sources believe that it was founded in 1849 by Carlo Castagna. According to another account, the company goes back to the Milanese carriage manufacturer Paolo Mainetti, who was founded in 1835. Its owner took the then nine-year-old Carlo Castagna into his company as an apprentice in 1849 or 1864. Over the years, Castagna rose to senior positions, according to this source. In the 1890s he became director of the company and partner. Under his leadership, Mainetti gradually bought up local competitors Albini, Enrico Orsaniga and Eugenio Ferrari and merged them to form Ferrari, Mainetti & Orsaniga. In 1894 Carlo Castagna took over the majority share in this company. After a restructuring and the participation of new investors from the Milanese aristocracy the company was given the name Fabbriche Riunite die Carrozze già Mainetti, Ferrari ed Orsaniga di C. Castagna in 1901, which was shortened to Carrozzeria Carlo Castagna in 1906.

In 1905, Castagna shifted the company's activities to the construction of automobile bodies. After Carlo Castagna's death in 1914, his son Ercole, born in 1885, initially took over the management of the company alone; In 1919, Carlo Castagna's younger son Emilio also joined the company. Emilio Castagna was responsible for designing numerous automobile bodies in the 1920s. At the beginning of the 1920s, the factory site reached a size of 32,000 m^{2}. Castagna had 400 employees and produced around 100 bodies per year. After the company became the largest Italian body manufacturer in the 1930s, producing bodies for companies such as Isotta Fraschini, Duesenberg, Alfa Romeo, Lancia, and Mercedes-Benz, production of civilian automobiles came to a standstill at the beginning of the Second World War. In 1942, the factories in Milan were completely destroyed in a bombardment. Emilio Castagna, who had already left the family business in 1940, founded an independent company in Milan, Carrozzeria Emilio Castagna, which existed until 1960 and primarily produced small series based on Fiat models.

After the end of the war, Ercole Castagna and the parent company moved into new production facilities in the Lombard community of Venegono Superiore. The attempt to build on the successes of the pre-war period failed. Castagna still designed and built some special bodies for Alfa Romeo and Lancia chassis, but given Italy's economic difficulties in the early post-war period, it did not find enough customers to continue the company permanently. In 1954 Carrozzeria Carlo Castagna ceased operations. The company still exist today somehow, and gained the awards of "Compasso d'oro" in 2018.

== Bodies from Castagna ==
Castagna began manufacturing automobile bodies in 1905. Following on from the customer base of Ferrari, Mainetti & Orsaniga, the automobile bodies were also intended for wealthy clients. From the beginning, Castagna produced for the Italian nobility; Later vehicles were also created for popes. The first car dressed by Castagna was a Fiat 24 HP for the Princess of Savoy. Further chassis came in the early phase from Mercedes-Benz, OTAV and Rochet-Schneider. Among the sensational creations from the pre-war period was a teardrop-shaped limousine called Aerodinamica, which was commissioned by the Milanese industrialist Marco Ricotti in 1914 and based on the ALFA 40/60 HP. During the First World War, the production of automotive bodies for private customers came to a standstill; Castagna built ambulances and trailers during the war years.

After the end of the war, Castagna turned back to luxury automobiles. The company designed and built unique models and small series for chassis from Alfa Romeo, Fiat, Isotta Fraschini and Lancia, and more rarely also from Mercedes-Benz and Duesenberg. They also used innovative techniques such as bodywork made of aluminum sheets for their bodies. From 1929 onwards, station wagons were also created in the Woodie style adopted from the US, which the Castagna Milano company, which was founded in 1994, also repeatedly took up. In the second half of the 1930s, Emilio Castagna's designs were often influenced by the trend in aerodynamics; Numerous bodies with flowing, rounded lines were created, particularly on Alfa Romeo 6C chassis. Another special feature of Castagna were the so-called Vistotal bodies. These bodies had frameless windshields. With the side windows directly adjacent to it, which were also without frames, there was an undisturbed all-round view, which anticipated the effect of a panoramic window. For the Vistotal bodies, Castagna used a patent from the French body manufacturer Labourdette, which the latter had marketed under the name Vutotal since 1935.

During the Second World War, Castagna produced military vehicles. After the end of the war, the company continued to produce a few unique pieces and small series upon customer request, increasingly in the pontoon style since the late 1940s. Advertising vehicles were also created, including a Simca designed as a sewing machine.

== Gallery ==
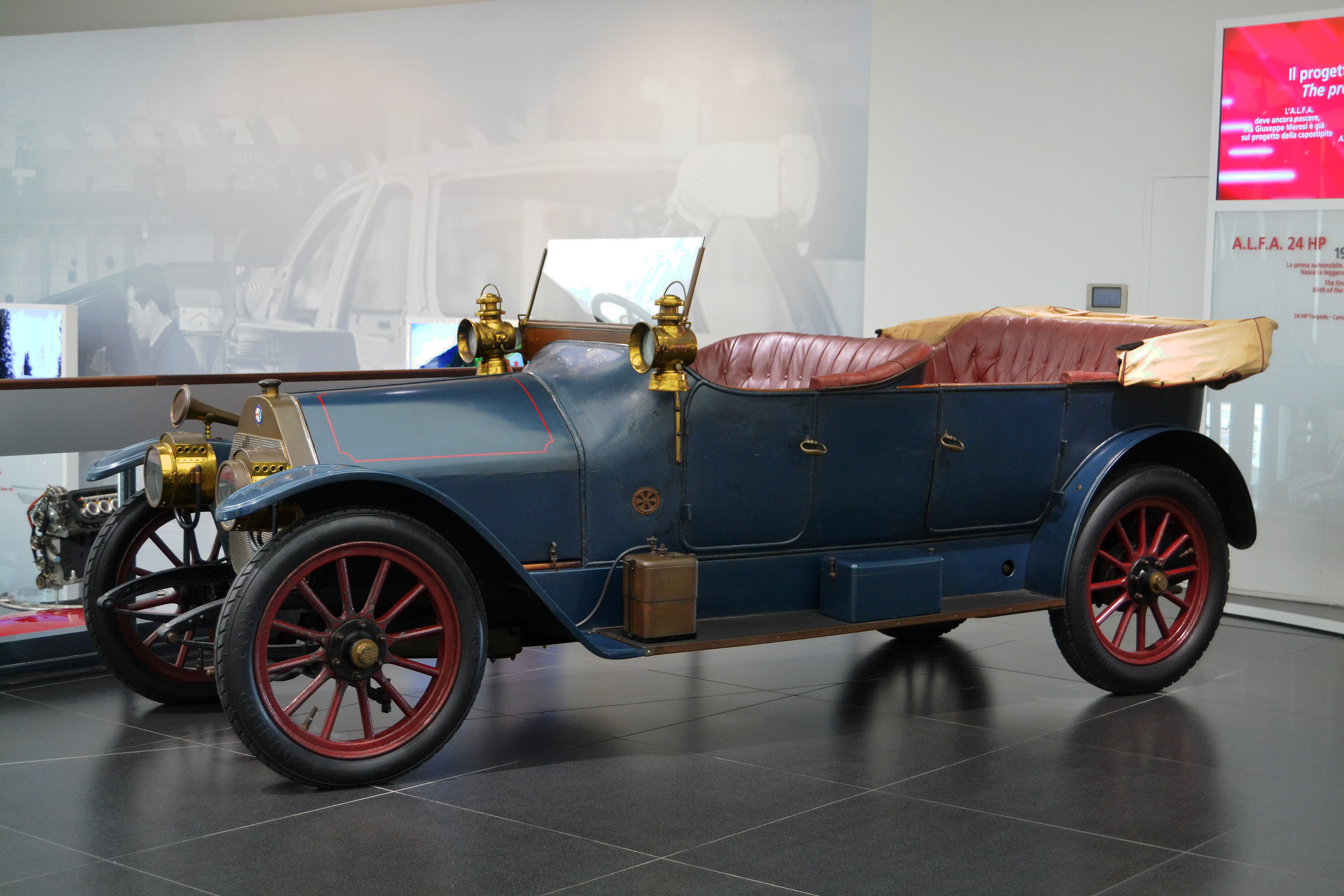
1910 ALFA 24 HP with Castagna body

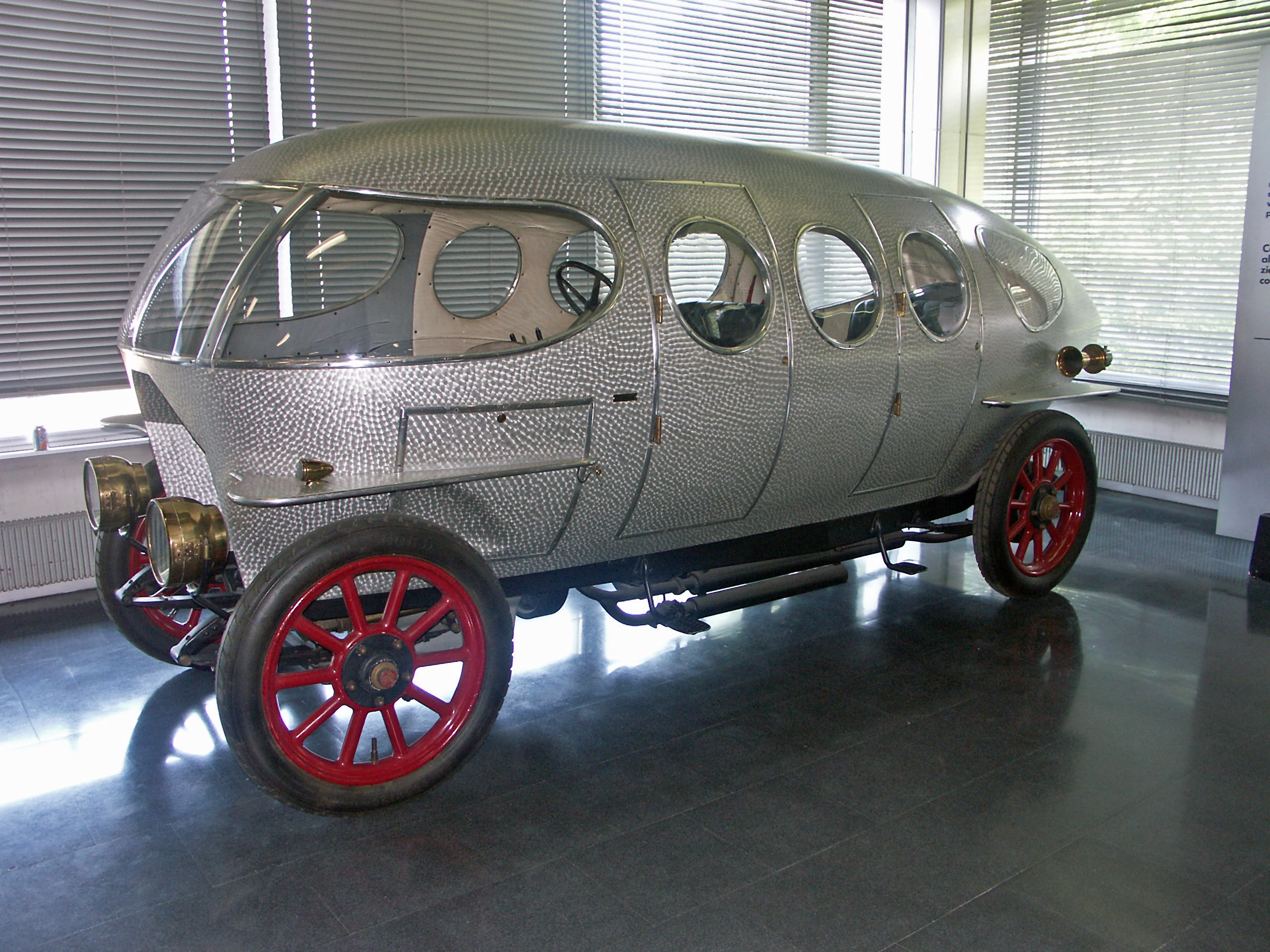
1913 ALFA 40/60 HP Aerodinamica

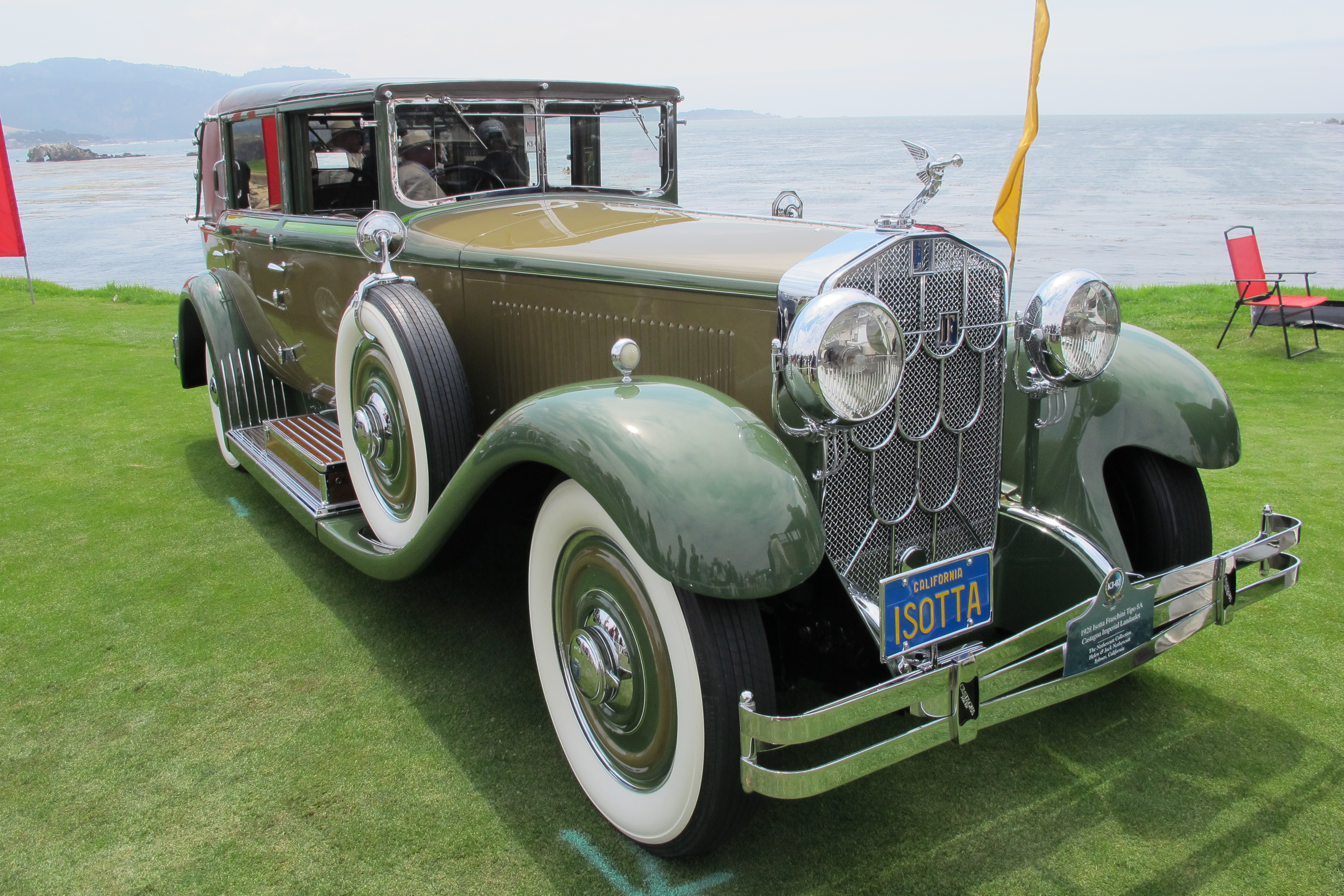
1928 Castagna Imperial Landaulet (Isotta Fraschini chassis)

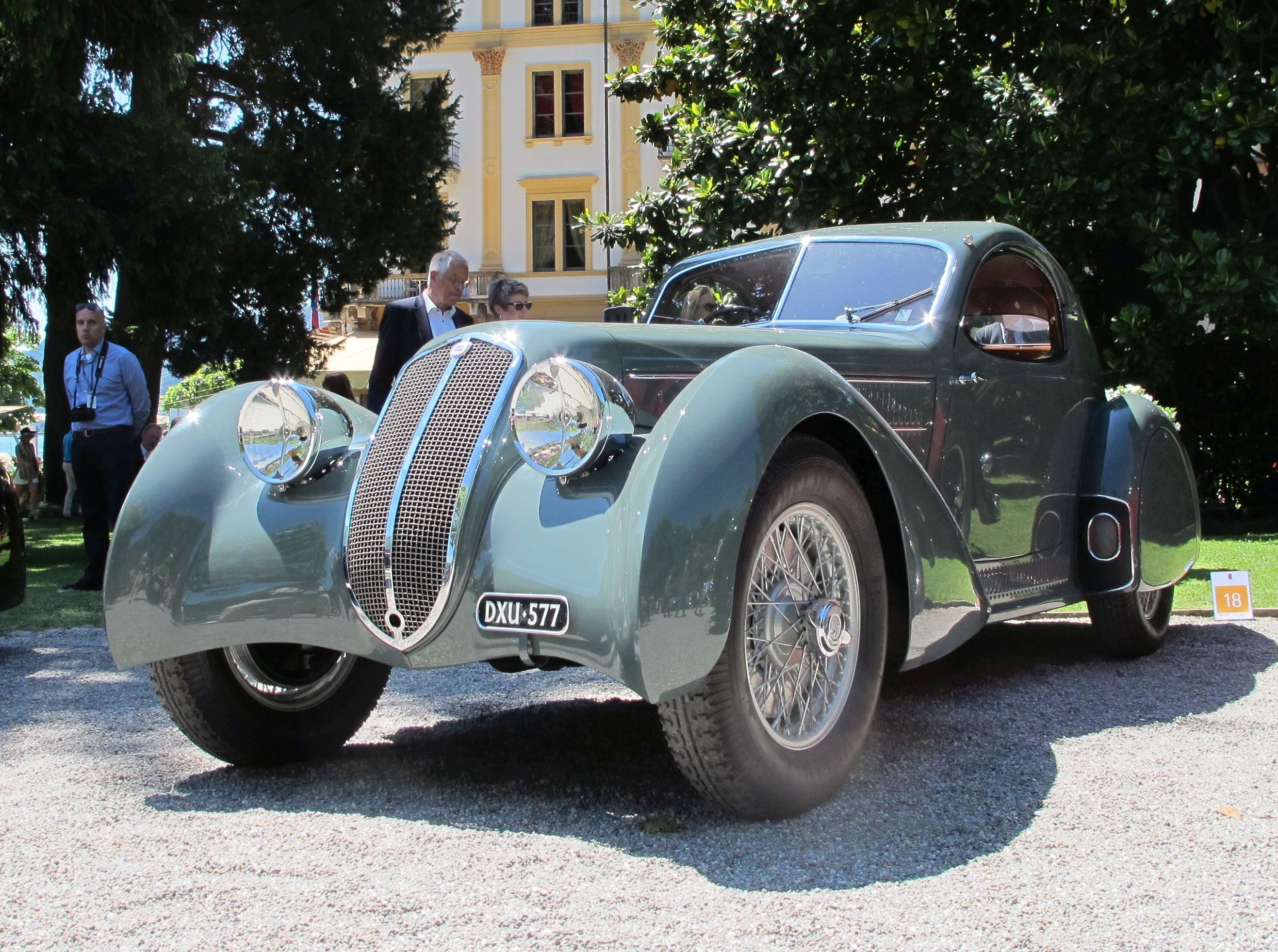
1933 Lancia Astura Series II with a Castagna body

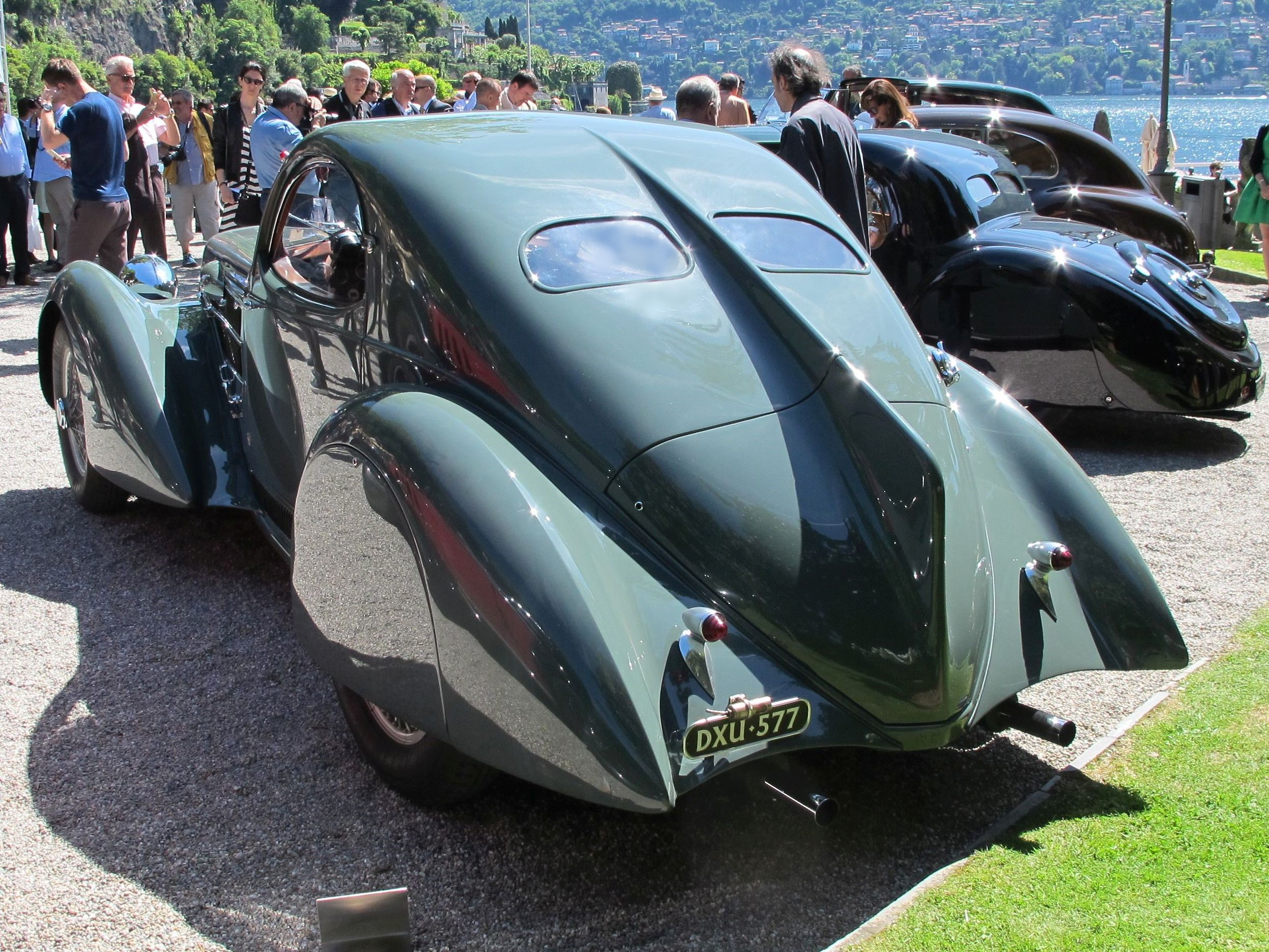
1933 Lancia Astura Series II with a Castagna body

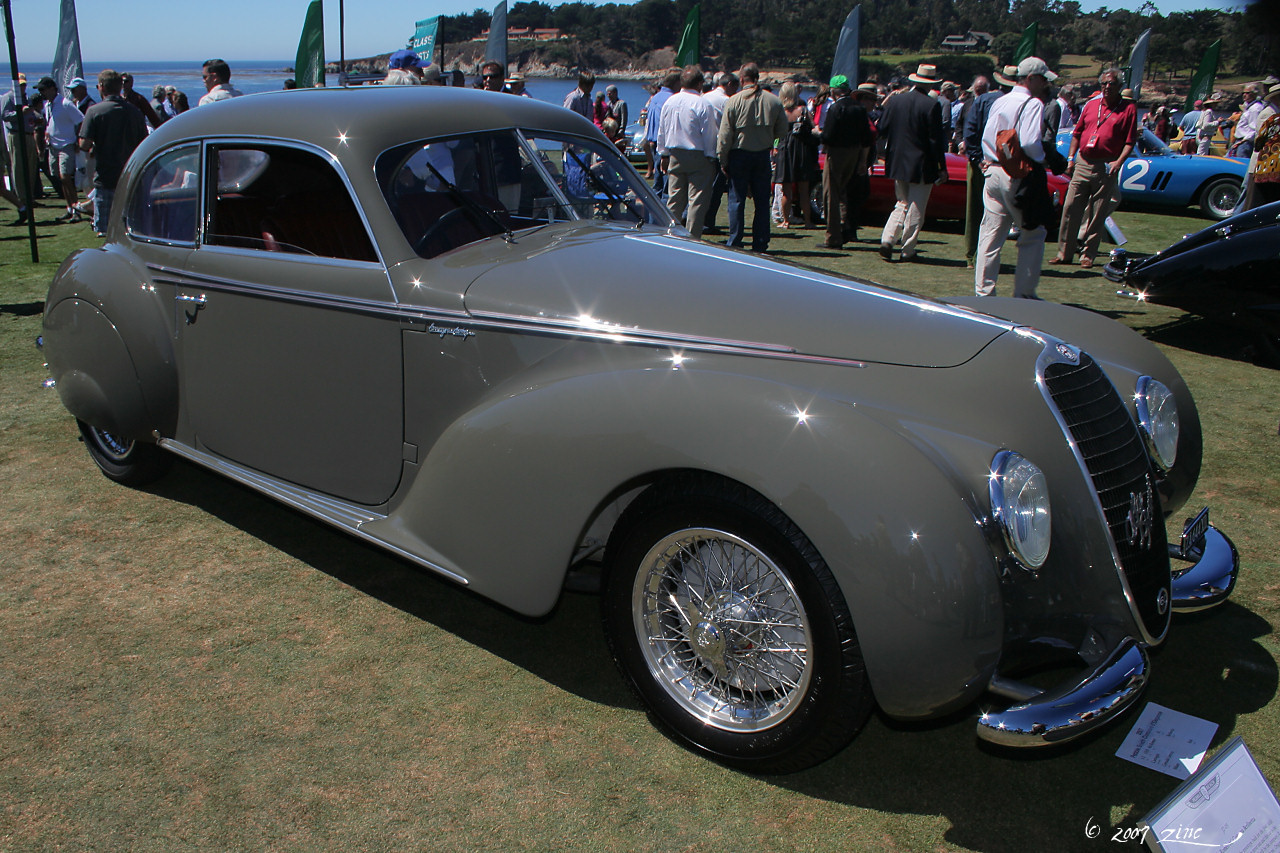
1939 Alfa Romeo 6C Castagna Berlinetta

== Revival ==
The company name was revived twice in the 1990s. In 1994, the Carrozzeria Castagna name was bought by a businessman Uberto Petra and Gioacchino Acampora, the latter an Italian automotive designer who created all of the recent projects of Castagna Milano, starting from the re-body of an Alfa Romeo 75 3.0 V6 as an Alfa Romeo Vittoria Castagna. The latest works of the company include a series of customised runabout and wood-panelled cars based on Fiat 500 and Mini.

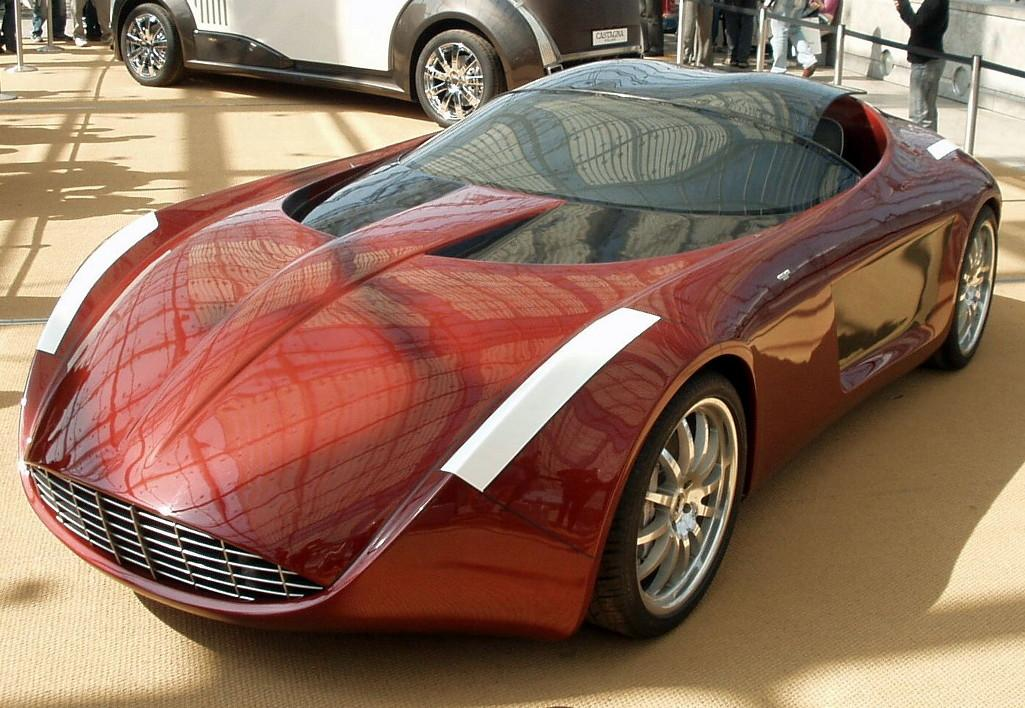
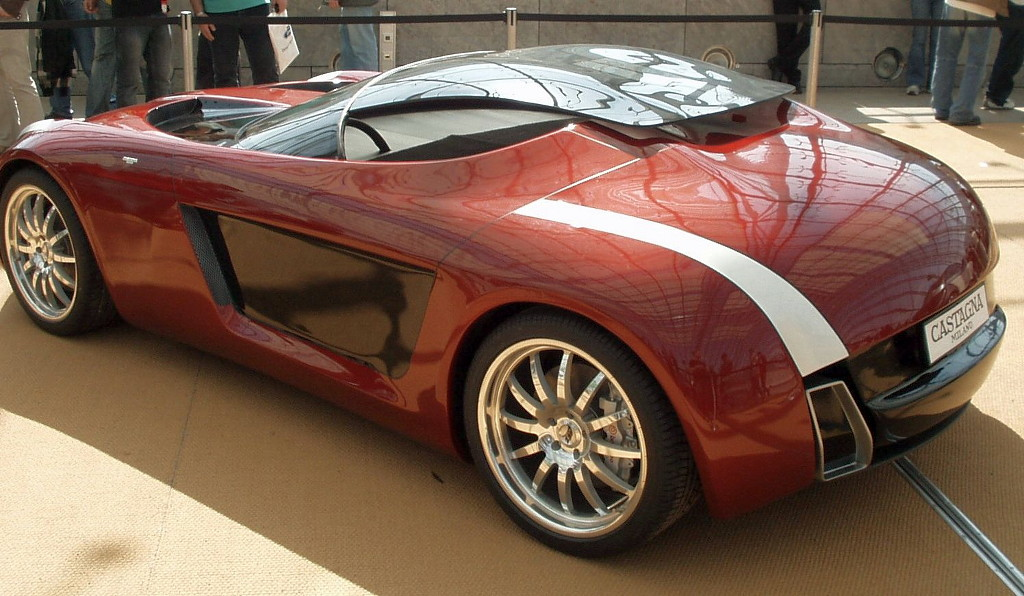
2003 Castagna Rossellini

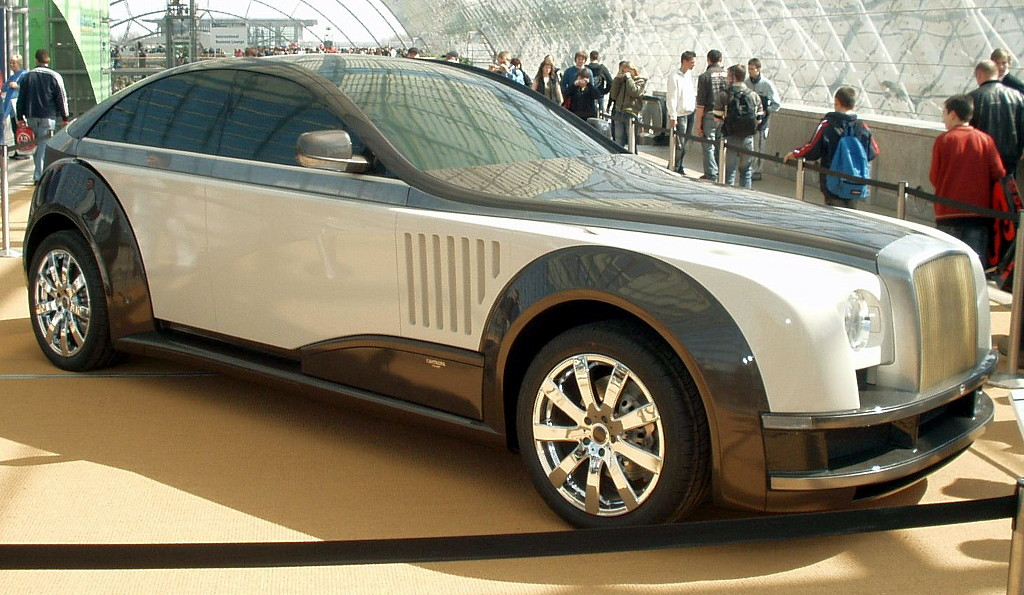
2006 Castagna Imperial Landaulet

List of cars designed by Gioacchino Acampora at Castagna Milano:

- 1995 Alfa Romeo Vittoria, based on Alfa Romeo 75 3.0 V6
- 1995 Maserati Auge concept car, based on Maserati Quattroporte IV and revised in 2002
- 2003 Castagna G.C., also called "Ginevra"
- 2003 Castagna Rossellini, based on Ferrari 550 Maranello
- 2004 Mini SUWagon
- 2004 Mini Woody
- 2005 Castagna Aria, based on Ferrari 575M
- 2005 Bentley Continental GT Shooting Brake
- 2005 Mini CrossUP
- 2005 Mini Tender
- 2006 Castagna Imperial Landaulet
- 2007 Fiat 500 Woody Wagon
- 2007 Castagna Aznom, based on Chevrolet Corvette
- 2008 Fiat Tender Two EV, based on Fiat 500
- 2015 Fiat 500C Ischia
- 2016 Fiat 500L Tiberio Taxi

== Literature ==
- Alessandro Sannia: Enciclopedia dei carrozzieri italiani. Società Editrice Il Cammello, 2017, ISBN 978-88-96796-41-2
