= Trieste-Opicina hillclimb =

Italian road race

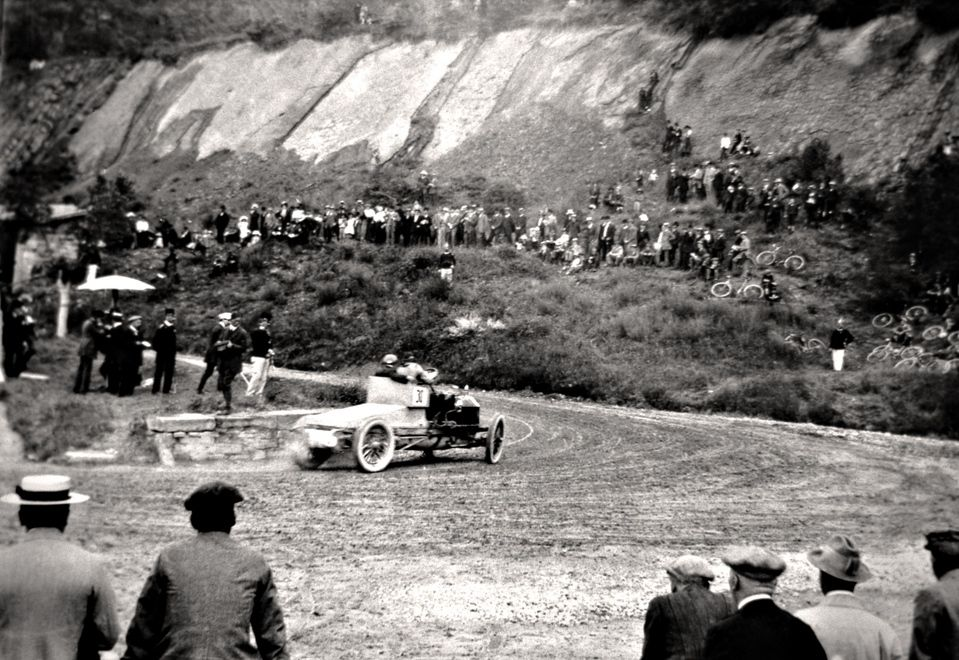
First edition held in 1911. "Curva delle Cave Faccanoni" turn.

Trieste-Opicina (1911–1971) is a hillclimb up the Opicina hill in Trieste, northeastern Italy. Also known as Albo d'Oro automobilistico. The race was suspended twice, in the First and Second World War.

The 8020m version of the race course, with elevation change of 252m, started in the city of Trieste, on the modern day Via Fabio Severo, eastbound. In the outskirts, the road is named Via Alfonso Valerio. The course has a lot of fast sweeps, and only one tight hairpin turn, the lefthander at the "Faccanoni" quarry, which is about half way. From here, the course heads north west. In the last quarter, the road is parallel to Trieste–Opicina tramway tracks. The 90 degree right hander "curva dell'Obelisco" leads to the finish at Opicina.

Hill climbs usually have no run off area, with the hill on one side, and descent on the other. In Trieste, the road is also ligned with buildings for much of the bottom part.

After a serious crash of Austrian Herbert Jerich in a Ford Escort TC and subsequent safety concerns the race was cancelled after its 1971 edition. From 2017, the historic race was recreated as a tour on closed roads around Trieste.

== Winners ==
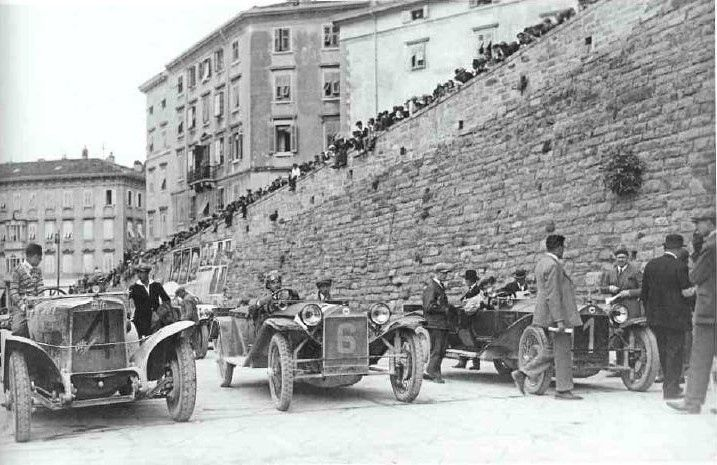
1927: Alfa Romeo RL Super Sport (left) and two Lancia Lambdas at the start line

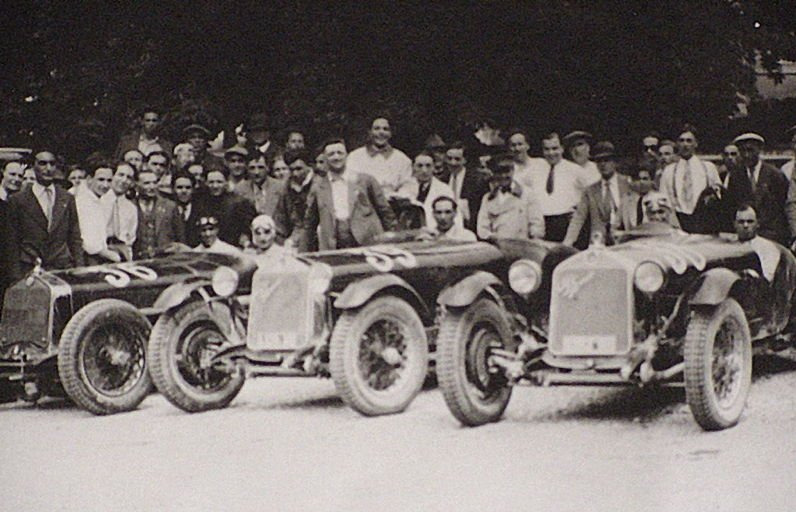
1930 winner Tazio Nuvolari in Alfa Romeo P2 no.36 next to Enzo Ferrari

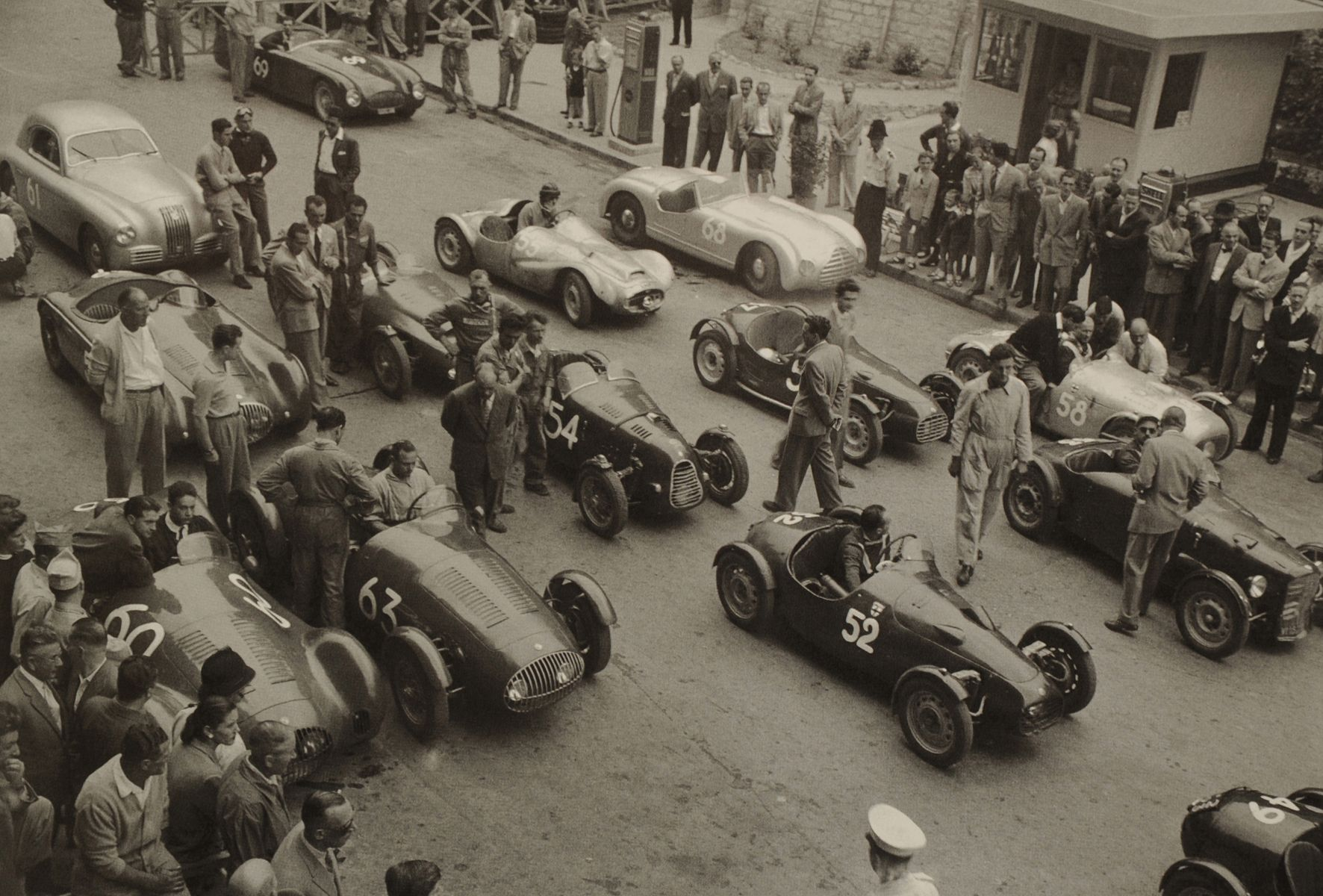
Before the start of 1951 edition

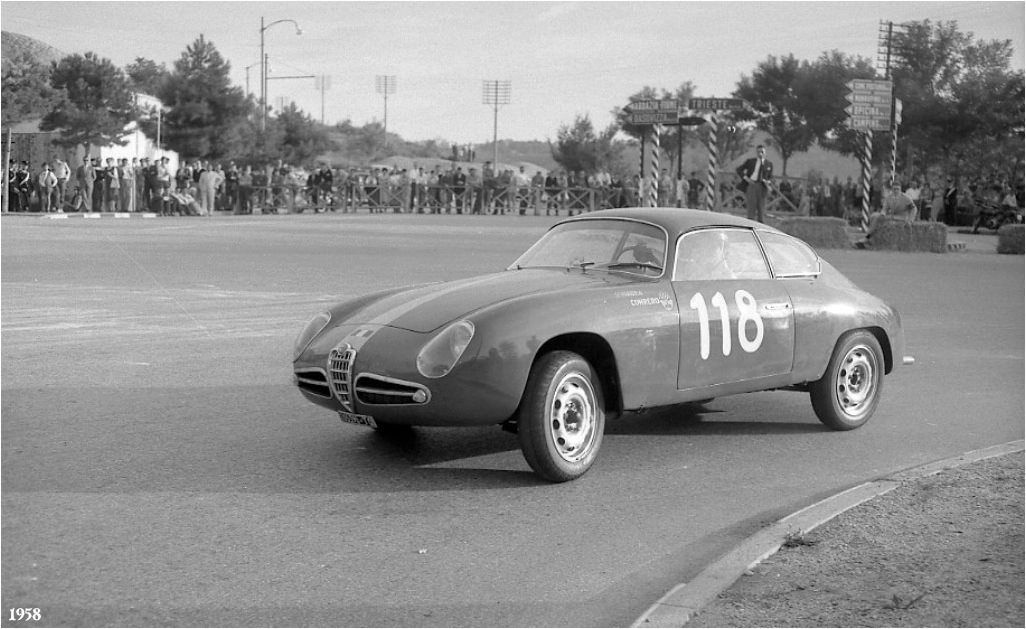
1958 winner Ada Pace in Alfa Romeo Giulietta SV Zagato

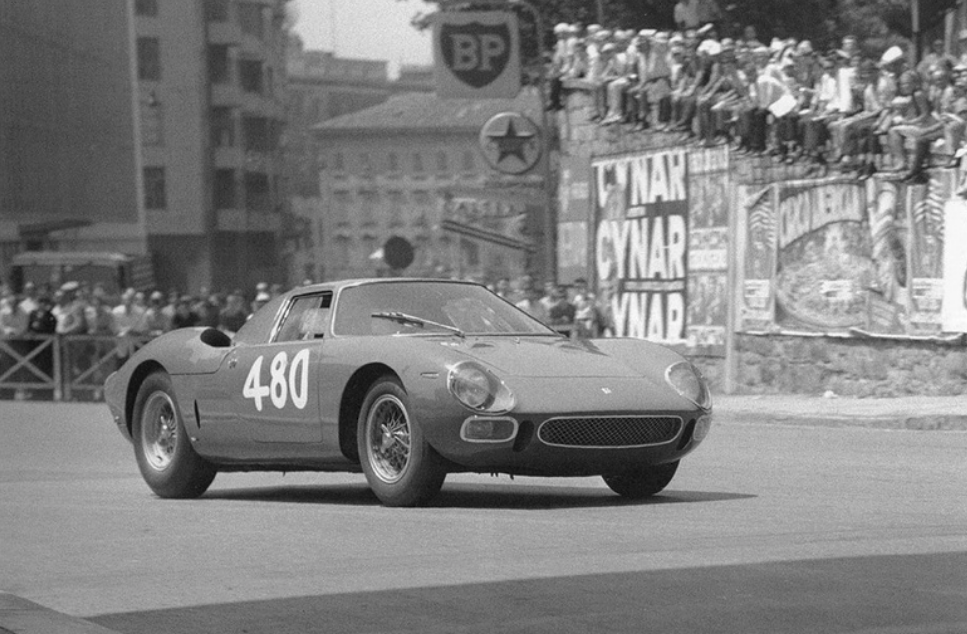
1965 winner Edoardo Lualdi-Gabardi in Ferrari 250 LM

| Date | Winner overall | Automobile | Distance | Time (min) | Average speed |
|---|---|---|---|---|---|
| 4 June 1911 | Otto Hieronimus | Laurin & Klement | 7.4 km (4.6 mi) | 6:07.6 | 72.742 km/h (45.200 mph) |
| 20 June 1926 | Emilio Richetti | Bugatti 2000 | 9.5 km (5.9 mi) | 7:50.0 | 72.766 km/h (45.215 mph) |
| 19 June 1927 | Ettore Franchetti | Diatto 2600 | 9.5 km (5.9 mi) | 7:29.0 | 80.623 km/h (50.097 mph) |
| 30 September 1928 | Gildo Strazza | Lancia Lambda VIII serie | 9.5 km (5.9 mi) | 7:50.4 | 72.713 km/h (45.182 mph) |
| 16 June 1929 | Achille Varzi | Alfa Romeo 6C 1750 SS | 13.5 km (8.4 mi) | 9:43.6 | 84.571 km/h (52.550 mph) |
| 15 June 1930 | Tazio Nuvolari | Alfa Romeo P2 | 9.5 km (5.9 mi) | 5:59.4 | 95.158 km/h (59.128 mph) |
| 14 June 1931 | Luigi Catalani | Alfa Romeo 6C 1750 GS | 9.5 km (5.9 mi) | 6:09.0 | 92.782 km/h (57.652 mph) |
| 12 June 1932 | Luigi Catalani | Alfa Romeo 6C 1500 SS | 9.5 km (5.9 mi) | 6:08.8 | 92.935 km/h (57.747 mph) |
| 25 June 1939 | Guido Kozmann | Lancia Aprilia | 8.715 km (5.415 mi) | 6:35.0 | 79.427 km/h (49.354 mph) |
| 31 October 1948 | Alberto Comirato | Fiat - Comirato 1100 | 9 km (5.6 mi) | 6:03.2 | 89.055 km/h (55.336 mph) |
| 29 October 1950 | Giulio Cabianca | OSCA Mt4 1350 | 9 km (5.6 mi) | 5:22.8 | 100.371 km/h (62.368 mph) |
| 23 September 1951 | Umberto Marzotto | Ferrari 212 Export spider Vignale | 9 km (5.6 mi) | 5:14.4 | 102.922 km/h (63.953 mph) |
| 15 June 1952 | Pietro Palmieri | Ferrari 225 S spider Vignale | 9 km (5.6 mi) | 5:25”0 | 99.962 km/h (62.114 mph) |
| 21 June 1953 | Franco Cornacchia | Ferrari 250 MM berlinetta Pinin Farina | 9 km (5.6 mi) | 5:15.7 | 102.629 km/h (63.771 mph) |
| 20 June 1954 | Franco Bordoni | Gordini 24 S | 9 km (5.6 mi) | 4:47.0 | 112.891 km/h (70.147 mph) |
| 29 June 1955 | Franco Bordoni | Maserati 300S | 9 km (5.6 mi) | 4:42.8 | 114.568 km/h (71.189 mph) |
| 6 October 1957 | Adolfo Tedeschi | Maserati 200SI | 8.85 km (5.50 mi) | 4:32.3 | 117.003 km/h (72.702 mph) |
| 5 October 1958 | Ada Pace | Alfa Romeo Giulietta SV Zagato | 8.85 km (5.50 mi) | 5:03.6 | 104.941 km/h (65.207 mph) |
| 26 July 1959 | Giulio Cabianca | OSCA Mt4 1500 | 8.85 km (5.50 mi) | 4:27.7 | 119.014 km/h (73.952 mph) |
| 24 July 1960 | Mennato Boffa | Maserati Tipo 60 "Birdcage" | 8.85 km (5.50 mi) | 4:22.4 | 121.417 km/h (75.445 mph) |
| 23 July 1961 | Edoardo Lualdi Gabardi | Ferrari 250 GT Berlinetta SWB | 10.15 km (6.31 mi) | 6:15.4 | 97.336 km/h (60.482 mph) |
| 22 July 1962 | Edoardo Lualdi Gabardi | Ferrari 250 GTO | 10.15 km (6.31 mi) | 4,54.8 | 123.948 km/h (77.018 mph) |
| 21 July 1963 | Francesco Ghezzi | Lotus (Formula Junior) | 10.15 km (6.31 mi) | 4:44.6 | 128.391 km/h (79.778 mph) |
| 19 July 1964 | Franco Patria | Simca Abarth 2000 | 10.15 km (6.31 mi) | 4:40.2 | 130.407 km/h (81.031 mph) |
| 18 July 1965 | Edoardo Lualdi Gabardi | Ferrari 250 LM | 10.15 km (6.31 mi) | 4:44.1 | 128.617 km/h (79.919 mph) |
| 31 July 1966 | Giacomo "Noris" Moiolo | Porsche Carrera 6 | 10.15 km (6.31 mi) | 4:34.2 | 133.260 km/h (82.804 mph) |
| 28 May 1967 | Edoardo Lualdi Gabardi | Dino 206 S | 10.15 km (6.31 mi) | 4:23.7 | 138.567 km/h (86.102 mph) |
| 25 May 1969 | Franco Pilone | Simca Abarth 2000 | 10.15 km (6.31 mi) | 4:27.3 | 136.7 km/h (84.9 mph) |
| 24 May 1970 | Giampiero Moretti (MOMO) | Ferrari 512 S | 8.02 km (4.98 mi) | 3:12.5 | 149.985 km/h (93.196 mph) |
| 23 May 1971 | Alessandro Moncini | Porsche 911 RS (Gr. 4) | 8.02 km (4.98 mi) | 4:23.6 | 109.529 km/h (68.058 mph) |

== The Trieste–Opicina motorcycle race (1920–1958) ==
Officially titled “Trieste – Poggioreale”, it is more known as “Trieste–Opicina”, arranged by the Moto Club Trieste.

| Data | Driver | Motorcycle | Distance | Time (min) | Average speed |
|---|---|---|---|---|---|
| 12 December 1920 | Giovanni Ferluga | Indian | 9 km (5.6 mi) | 9:34 | 56.348 km/h (35.013 mph) |
| March 1922 | Romolo Spallanzani | Galloni | 9 km (5.6 mi) | 8:00 | 66.88 km/h (41.56 mph) |
| 11 March 1923 | Guido Mentasti | Norton | 9 km (5.6 mi) | 8:34 | 64.74 km/h (40.23 mph) |
| 25 April 1926 | Ugo Prini | Guzzi | 9 km (5.6 mi) | 7:22 | 74.69 km/h (46.41 mph) |
| 1 May 1927 | Giovanni Ferluga | Harley-Davidson sidecar | 9 km (5.6 mi) | 7:22 | 74.69 km/h (46.41 mph) |
| May 1929 | Marino Fabian | AJS | 9 km (5.6 mi) | 8:02 | 67.47 km/h (41.92 mph) |
| 14 May 1931 | Pietro Marta | Rudge | 9.5 km (5.9 mi) | 6:35 | 86.582 km/h (53.800 mph) |
| 5 May 1932 | Arduino Bertos | NSU | 9 km (5.6 mi) | 5:55 | 91.165 km/h (56.647 mph) |
| June 1933 | Carlo Covacich | Norton | 9 km (5.6 mi) | 5:57 | 90.553 km/h (56.267 mph) |
| June 1947 | Giovanni Bosich | BMW | 9.5 km (5.9 mi) | 6:24 | 89.01 km/h (55.31 mph) |
| 10 October 1948 | Alberto Trenca | Matchless 350 | 9 km (5.6 mi) | 5:57.03 | 90.670 km/h (56.340 mph) |

== See also ==
- Club dei Venti all'Ora

== Literature ==
- Tito Angelo Anselmi; Gabriella De Benedetti (2003). Legenda-Le edizioni dell'Opificio (ed.). Trieste Opicina Sessant'Anni di Epopea. ISBN 9781554075584.
