= Aerauto PL.5C =

Italian roadable aircraft

General information
- Type: Roadable aircraft
- National origin: Italy
- Manufacturer: Carrozzeria Colli
- Designer: Luigi Pellarini
- Number built: 1

History
- First flight: 1949
- Retired: 1953

The Aerauto PL.5C was a roadable aircraft developed in Italy in the early 1950s. It was a high-wing two-seat monoplane whose wings could be folded to quickly transform it into an automobile. It was different from many such projects in that it used its pusher propeller (powered by a Continental C85) for propulsion not only in the air, but on the road as well. Development was abandoned in 1953.

Designed by aircraft engineer Luigi Pellarini, the Aerauto was built by Carrozzeria Colli in Milan.

== Specifications (PL.5C) ==
Data from Jane's All The World's Aircraft 1951–52

General characteristics

- Crew: 1
- Capacity: 1 passenger
- Wingspan: 10.2 m (33 ft 6 in)
- Width: 2.2 m (7 ft 3 in) (wings folded)
- Wing area: 13.2 m^{2} (142 sq ft)
- Empty weight: 460 kg (1,014 lb)
- Gross weight: 700 kg (1,543 lb)
- Powerplant: 1 × Continental air-cooled flat-four engine, 63 kW (85 hp)

Performance

- Maximum speed: 180 km/h (110 mph, 97 kn)
- Cruise speed: 160 km/h (99 mph, 86 kn)
- Range: 800 km (500 mi, 430 nmi)
- Service ceiling: 4,000 m (13,000 ft)
- Rate of climb: 2.72 m/s (535 ft/min)
