= Alfa Romeo Giulietta (1954) =

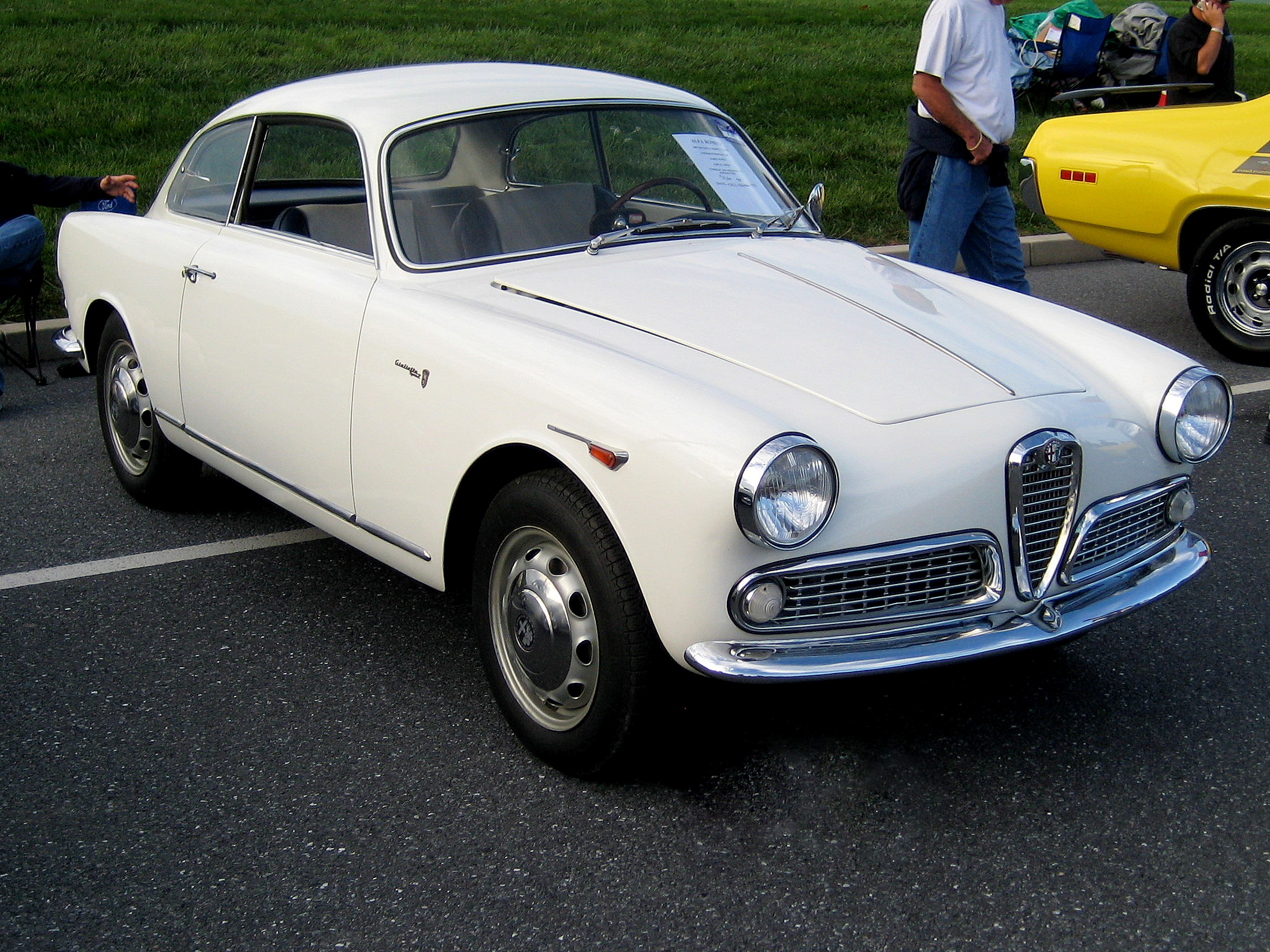
- Alfa Romeo Giulietta Sprint (ca. 1960)

Overview
- Manufacturer: Alfa Romeo
- Production: 1954–1965
- Assembly: Italy: Portello, Milan (Berlina); Grugliasco (Sprint, Bertone); San Giorgio Canavese (Spider, Pinin Farina); South Africa: East London (Car Distributors Assembly: 1960–63 T.I. model)
- Designer: Franco Scaglione at Bertone (Sprint, Sprint Speciale); Pinin Farina (Spider); Ercole Spada at Zagato (SZ)

Body and chassis
- Class: Family car
- Body style: 4-door Saloon; Roadster (Spider); 2+2 coupé (Sprint); 2-seater coupé (SS, SZ)
- Layout: Front-engine, rear-wheel-drive

Powertrain
- Engine: 1.3 L Twin Cam I4 (petrol)
- Transmission: 4-speed manual 5-speed manual (SS and SZ)

Dimensions
- Wheelbase: Berlina/Sprint: 2,380 mm (93.7 in); Spider: 2,250 mm (88.6 in)
- Length: Berlina: 4,033 mm (158.8 in); Sprint: 3,980 mm (156.7 in); Spider: 3,900 mm (153.5 in)
- Width: Berlina: 1,550 mm (61.0 in); Sprint: 1,535 mm (60.4 in); Spider: 1,580 mm (62.2 in)
- Height: Berlina: 1,405 mm (55.3 in); Sprint: 1,320 mm (52.0 in); Spider: 1,335 mm (52.6 in)
- Kerb weight: Berlina: 915 kg (2,017 lb); Sprint: 880 kg (1,940 lb); Spider: 860 kg (1,896 lb); SZ: 770 kg (1,698 lb)

Chronology
- Successor: Alfa Romeo Giulia (105); Alfa Romeo Giulia TZ (Giulietta SZ); Alfa Romeo 105/115 Coupés (Coupé/Sprint)

The Alfa Romeo Giulietta (Tipo 750 and Tipo 101, meaning "Type 750" and "Type 101") is a family of automobiles made by Italian car manufacturer Alfa Romeo from 1954 until 1965 which included a 2+2 coupé, four-door saloon, estate, spider, Sprint, and Sprint Speciale. The 2+2 was Alfa Romeo's first successful foray into the 1.3-litre class. From 1954 to 1965 a total of 177,690 Giuliettas were made, the great majority in saloon (Berlina), Sprint coupé, or Spider body styles, but also as Sprint Speciale and Sprint Zagato coupés, and the rare Promiscua estate.

The Giulietta series was succeeded by the Giulia in 1962.

== Giulietta Sprint, Veloce ==
The first Giulietta to be introduced was the Giulietta Sprint 2+2 coupé at the 1954 Turin Motor Show. Designed by Franco Scaglione at Bertone, it was produced at the coachbuilder's Grugliasco plant near Turin. Owing to overwhelming demand upon the model's introduction, the earliest Giulietta Sprints were hand-built by Alfa Romeo with bodywork made at Bertone and Ghia providing interior and electrical components. Approximately 200–1000 "pre-production" cars were made in this manner, with numerous cosmetic and mechanical differences from the later production cars built at Grugliasco.

In 1956, the initially competition-oriented Sprint Veloce version arrived. Weight dropped from 852 to 780 kg (1,878 to 1,720 lb) thanks to various weight-saving efforts, including removing the roll-down windows and mechanisms in favor of sliding, plexiglass units. The Sprint Veloce also did not receive the chromed hubcaps of the standard Sprint. Thanks to two horizontal twin-barrel Weber 40 DCOE3 carburettors, an electric Bendix fuel pump, and a raised compression ratio of 9.5:1, power climbed to 90 PS CUNA (66 kW; 89 bhp) at 6,500 rpm with torque of 12.0 kg⋅m (118 N⋅m; 87 lb⋅ft) at 4,500 rpm. Alfa Romeo also issued an SAE gross rating of 104 PS (76 kW; 103 bhp) which may be seen in period brochures. The Sprint Veloce did enter competitions, claiming the first three positions in its class at the 1956 Mille Miglia, for instance, but it was frequently bought as a small gran turismo and Alfa accordingly introduced a Confortevole ("comfortable") version, featuring wind-down plexiglass door windows in aluminium frames, chromed hubcaps, and different, larger headlamps. Around 200 Confortevoles were built.

Sometime in late 1956, after the Berlina T.I. and Sprint Veloce had been introduced, the regular Sprint received a small bump in claimed power which increased from 65 to 70 PS CUNA (51 kW; 69 bhp) at 6,000 rpm. In June 1958 the Giulietta Sprint Series II was presented at Monza, going on sale in early 1959. The Series II was given certain exterior modifications, developed by a young Giorgetto Giugiaro. The most notable change is that the front grille was changed to a finer grid pattern, while the flanking openings received full grilles in the same style (incorporating the turn signals), in lieu of the original's chromed eyebrows. The taillights and license plate holder were also modified. At the same time, the trim differences for the Sprint and Sprint Veloce versions disappeared, with all models now receiving roll-down glass windows and chromed hubcaps. The mechanicals were also revised: the compression ratio was increased to 8.5:1 and a re-engineered, split exhaust manifold was installed; power increased to 80 PS CUNA (59 kW; 79 bhp) at 6,300 rpm.

At the end of 1962, the Giulietta Sprint was discontinued in favor of the larger engined, 104 PS (76 kW; 103 bhp) Giulia Sprint which had been introduced in June 1962. Externally, the two types are nearly indistinguishable, although the Giulia did get a new steering wheel and dashboard. The Giulia Sprint (1600) was discontinued when the new Giulia GT was introduced in 1964, but the 1300-engined Giulietta (Tipo 101.02) was returned to production in early 1964 as the "Alfa Romeo 1300 Sprint" as a lower-cost option which also suited the Italian taxation system. The 1300 Sprint continued to be built until late 1965, remaining in price lists until November 1966.

1956 Giulietta Sprint Veloce (Series I with sliding plexiglass windows)

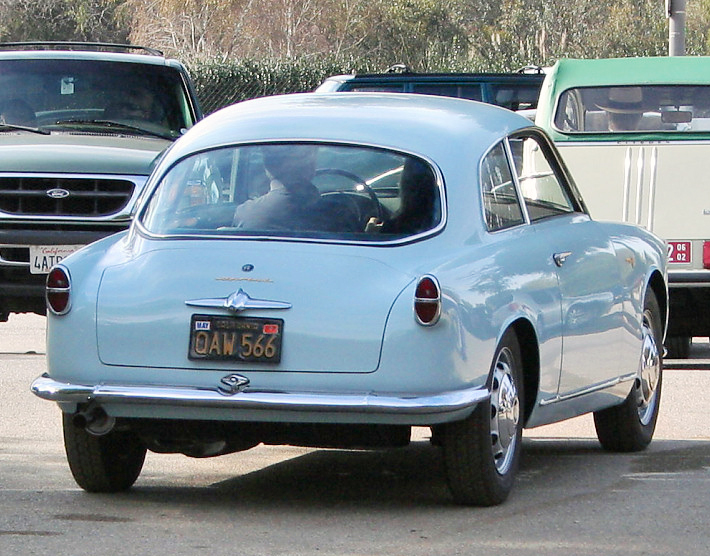
Rear view of Series I Giulietta Sprint (1956)

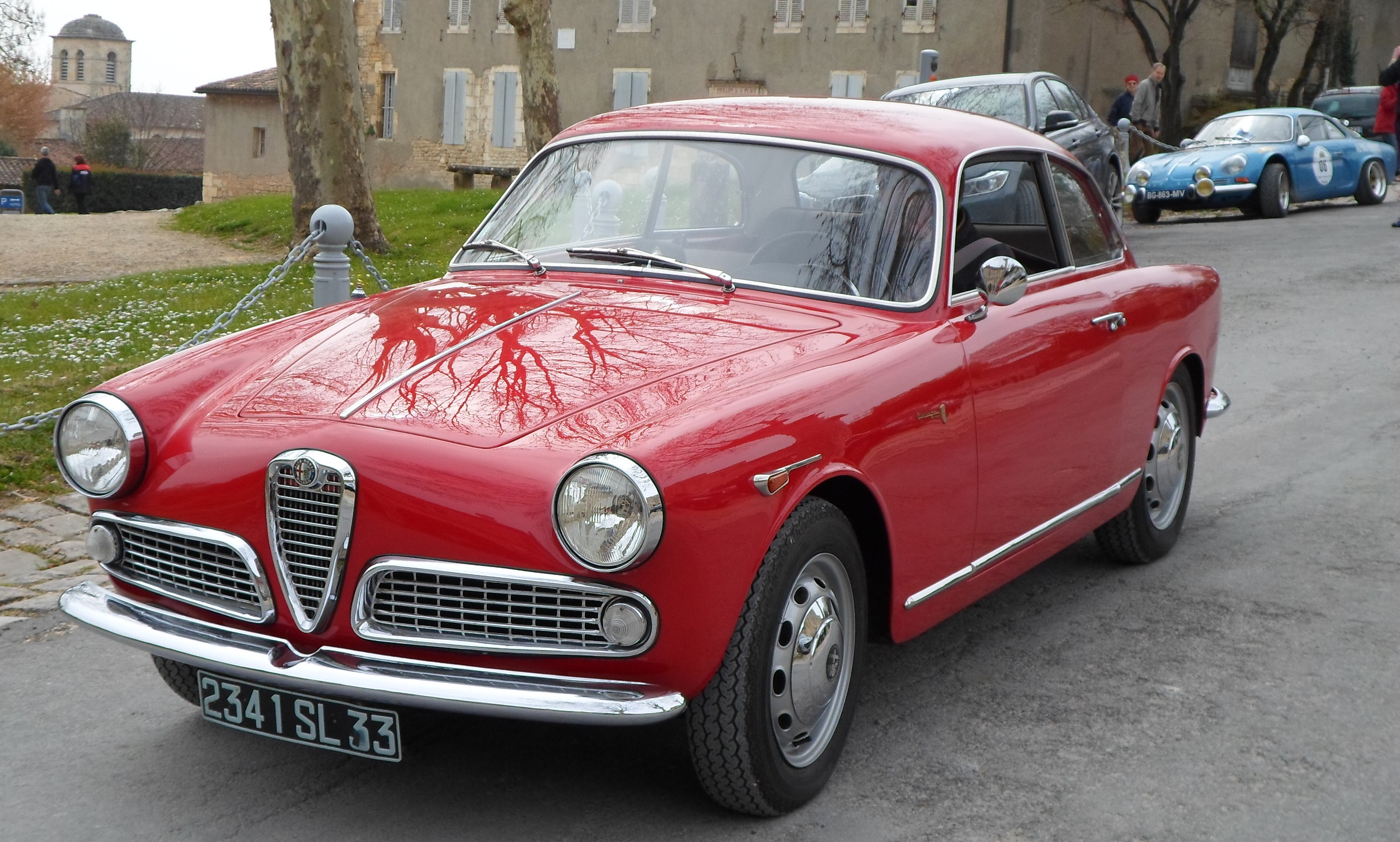
Giulietta Sprint, Series II

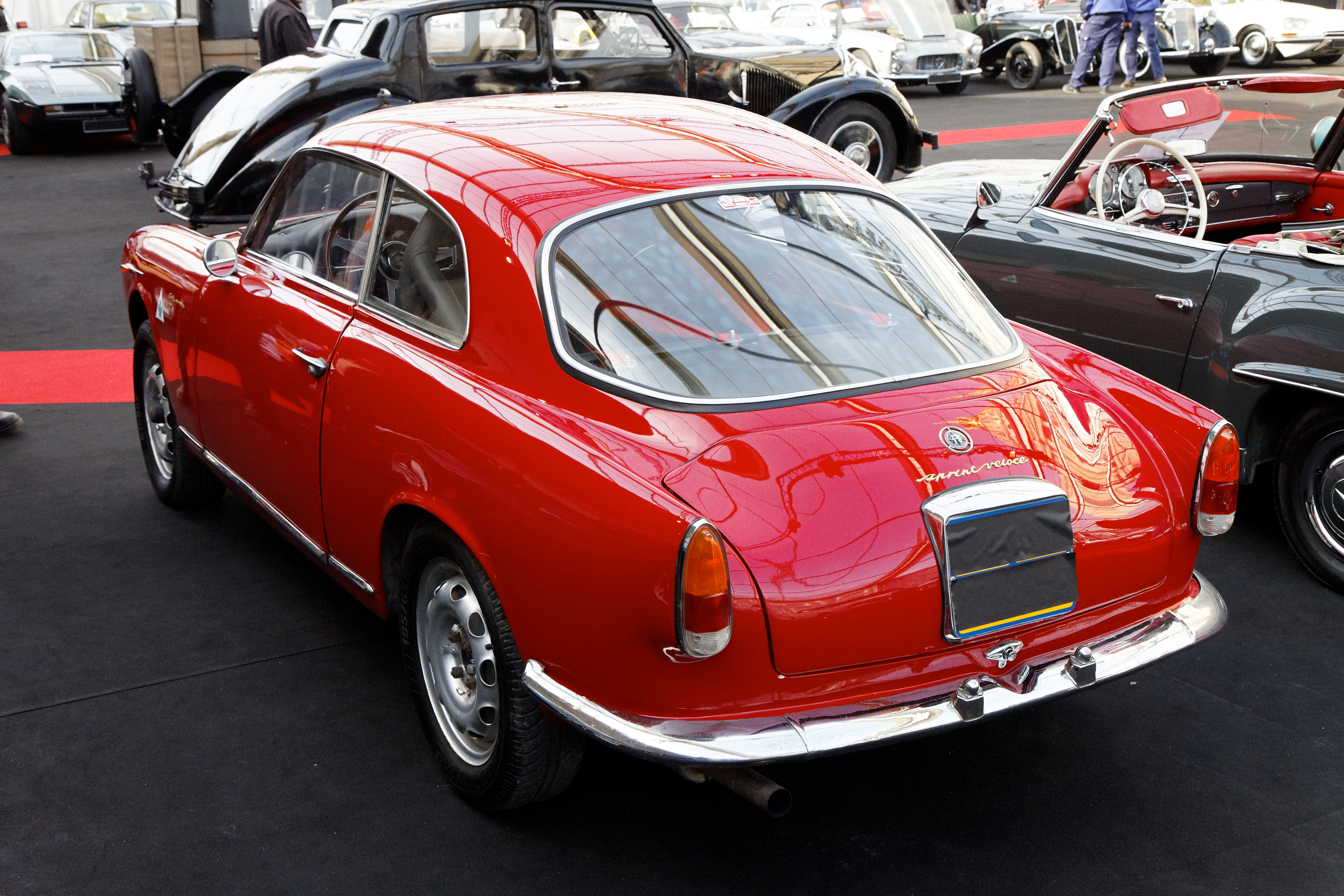
1959 Giulietta Sprint Veloce

=== Giulietta Sprint Speciale ===
The Alfa Romeo Giulietta Sprint Speciale (also called the Giulietta SS, internal model code Tipo 101.20) was an aerodynamic two-door, two-seat coupé designed by Franco Scaglione at Bertone. 1,366 were made from 1957 until 1962. The car had a steel body, and was based on a short-wheelbase Giulietta chassis. It used a 1.3-litre engine brought to 100 PS (74 kW; 99 bhp) thanks to double twin-choke carburettors and a high compression ratio. The bodystyle continued to be used with the larger, 1570 cc engine as the Giulia Sprint Speciale.

=== Giulietta Sprint Zagato ===
The Alfa Romeo Giulietta SZ (for Sprint Zagato, officially the Tipo 101.26, or "Type 101.26") was an aluminium-bodied 2-seater berlinetta, built by Zagato for competition use on the chassis and mechanicals of the Sprint Speciale.

A crashed Sprint Veloce was rebodied by Zagato in late 1956, and was immediately successful in competition. Zagato ended up building 18 rebodied Veloces, called the SVZ and the version gave rise to a full production version. The SVZ was about 120 kg (260 lb) lighter than the Coupé on which it was based, and had the highest tuned, 118 PS (87 kW; 116 bhp) version of the Giulietta engine.

A production competition version of the Giulietta, with lightened bodywork designed by Ercole Spada at Zagato was then premiered at the 1960 Geneve Salon. Handbuilt by Zagato, entirely in aluminium and with plexiglass windows, the lightened Sprint Zagato (SZ) was light, fast, and expensive. Two hundred seventeen were built, the original design with a rounded rear and with the last thirty (some say 46) receiving a longer kamm-style rear end as well as disc brakes up front. The original design is called the "Coda Tonda" (round tail), while the Kamm-design is referred to as the "Coda Tronca" (truncated tail). The Coda Tronca is sometimes also referred to as the "SZ2". The first examples were built in December 1959, and production continued into 1962. Zagato also rebodied a few existing cars with this bodywork, leading to discrepancies in the production numbers.

The SZ was very successful in racing, on a national level as well as internationally. The SZ helped Alfa Romeo secure a victory in the 1.3 litre class of the International Championship for GT Manufacturers in 1962 and 1963. Michel Nicol won the Tour de Corse in 1957.

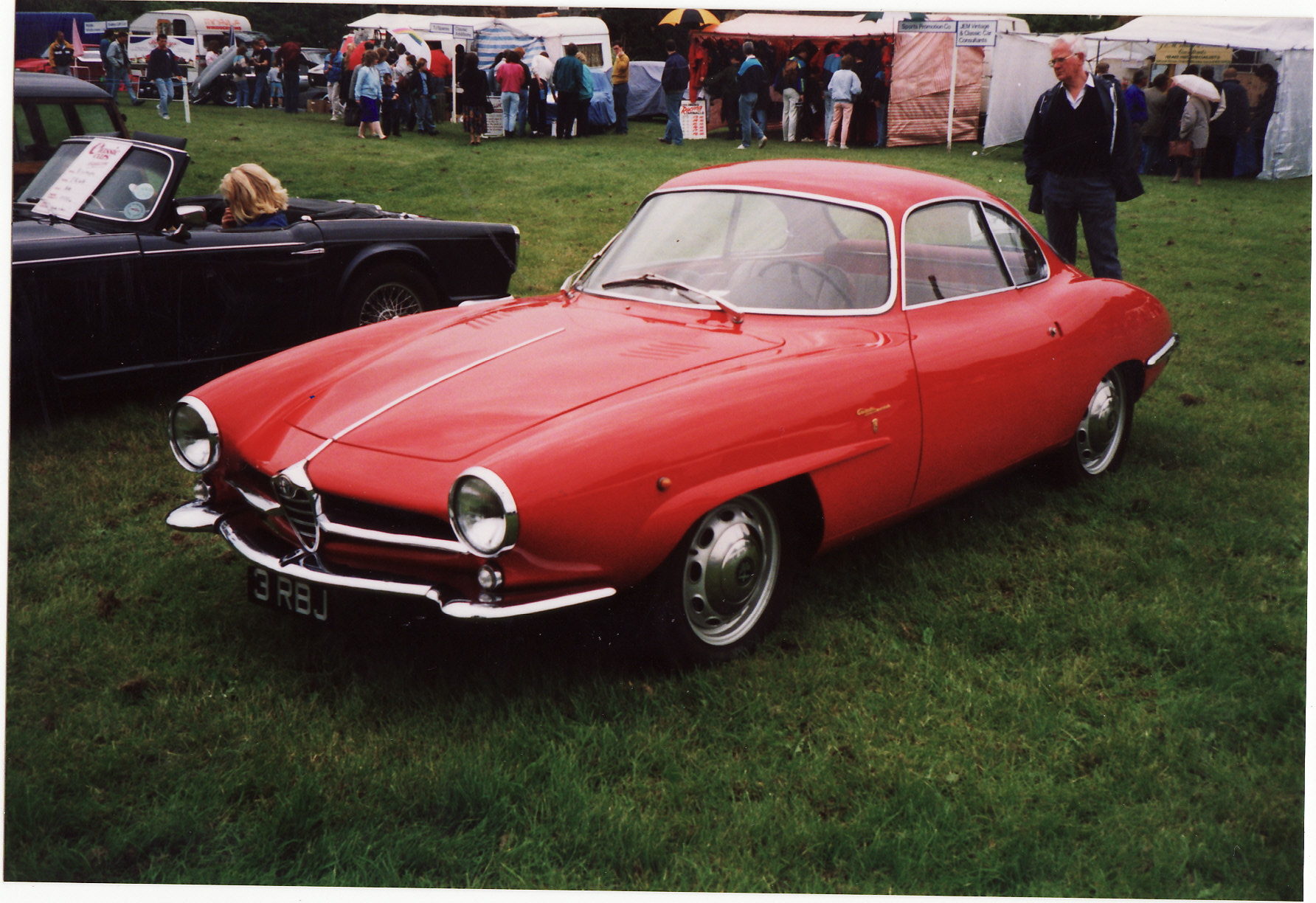
1959 Alfa Romeo Giulietta Sprint Speciale (SS, Tipo 101.20)

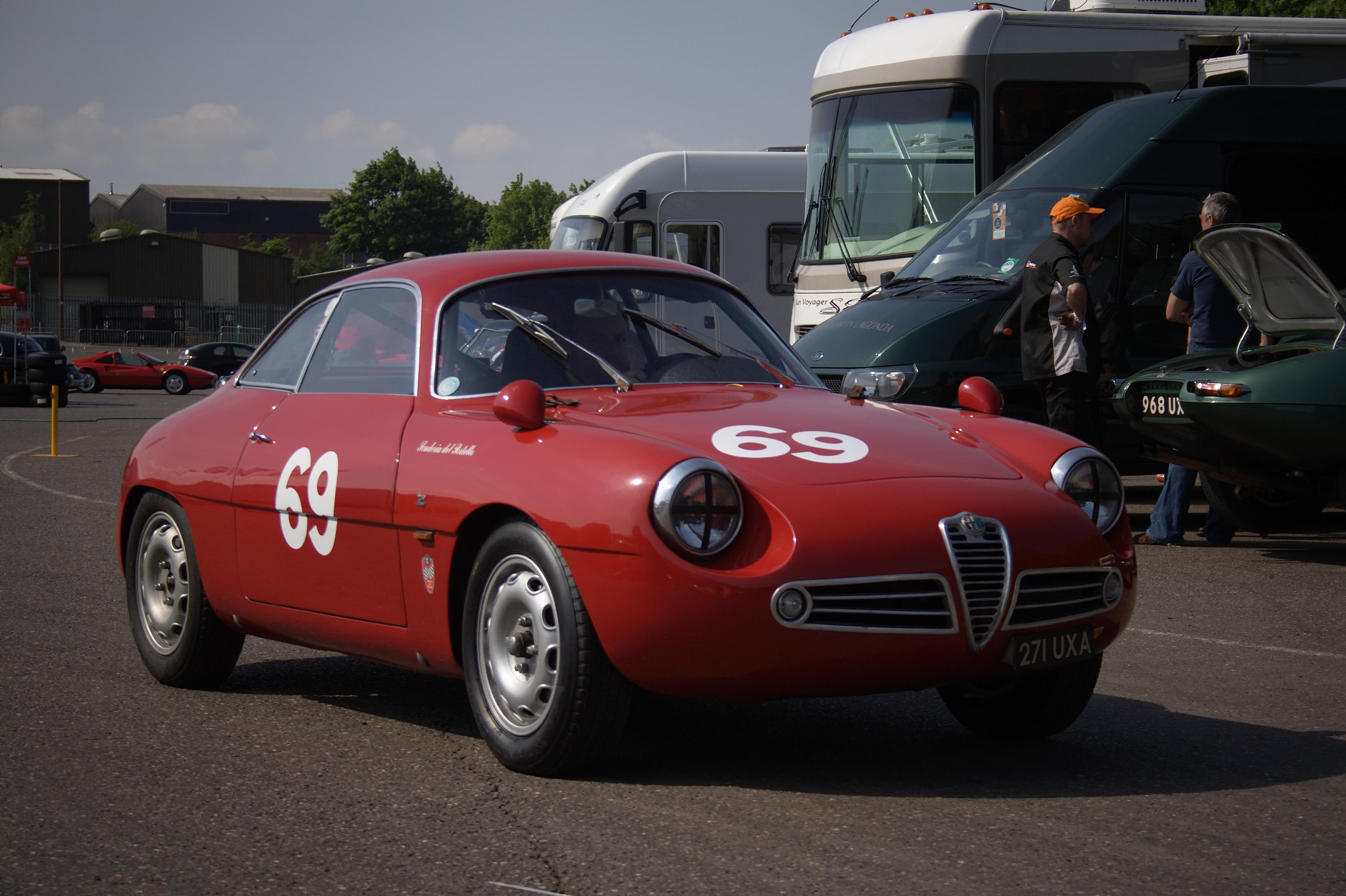
Alfa Romeo Giulietta SZ "Coda Tonda" (Tipo 101.26)

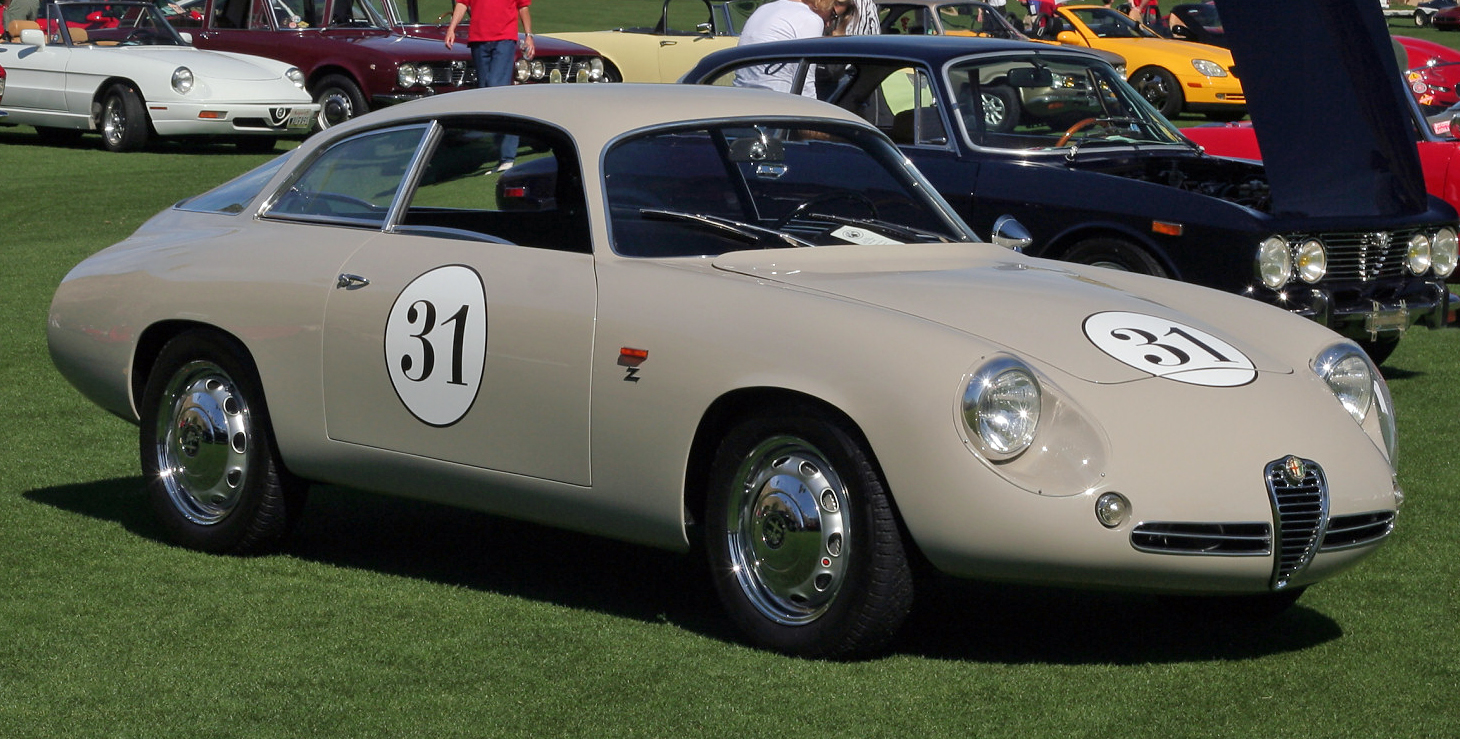
1961 Alfa Romeo Giulietta SZ "Coda Tronca" (SZ2, Tipo 101. 26)

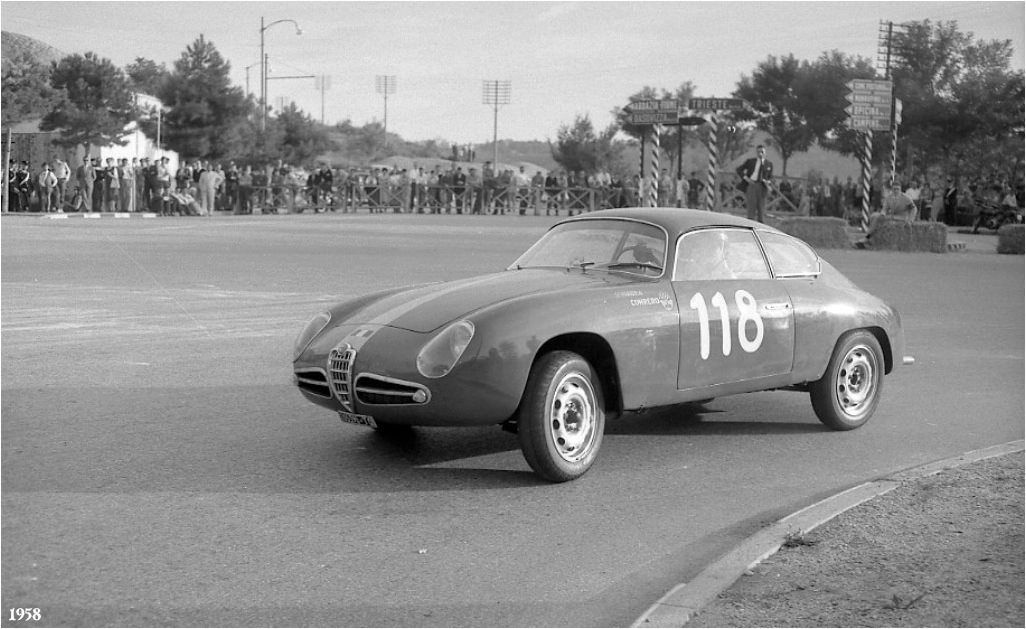
Alfa Romeo Giulietta SVZ, winner of the 1958 Trieste-Opicina hillclimb

== Giulietta Berlina ==
A year later, at the Turin Motor Show in April 1955, the Sprint was joined by the 4-door Berlina saloon which had always been intended as the main offering. This had an engine with a much gentler tune, lower compression ratio (7.5:1) and one single-barrel carburettor, to provide better fuel economy and drivability. Max power was 50 PS CUNA (37 kW; 49 bhp) at 5,200 rpm (53 PS according to some sources). In late summer 1957 the Berlina T.I. (Turismo Internazionale) appeared, using an engine very similar to that of the Giulietta Sprint. Thanks to a Solex, twin-barrel carburettor and a slight bump in compression ratio to 8.0:1, the maximum power was brought up to 65 PS CUNA (48 kW; 64 bhp) at 5,500 rpm. The T.I. also received minor cosmetic changes to the hood, the dial lights and rear lamps.

To streamline production and to lower manufacturing costs, the Giulietta Berlina (and sporting variants as well) underwent a series of gradual minor changes to the bodywork from 1957 until 1959. The engine block castings were also changed from sand casting to die casting, prior to the introduction of the 1570 cc Giulia engine. The carburettors were also subject to revision and in 1958 a new, stronger gearbox with Porsche-type syncromesh was introduced. Still a four-speed, it included provisions for adding a fifth.

Carrozzeria Colli also made a Giulietta station wagon variant called Giulietta Promiscua. Ninety-one examples of this version were built. Carrozzeria Boneschi also made a few station wagon examples called Weekendina.

=== 1959 restyling ===
A new version of the Giulietta Berlina debuted at the Frankfurt Motor Show in 1959. Mechanical changes were limited to shifting the fuel pump from the cylinder head to a lower position below the distributor, and moving the previously exposed fuel filler cap from the tail to the right rear wing, under a flap. The bodywork showed a revised front end, with more rounded wings, recessed head lights, and new grilles with chrome frames and two horizontal bars. The rear also showed changes, with new larger tail lights on vestigial fins, which replaced the earlier rounded rear wings. The interior was much more organized and upholstered in new cloth material; the redesigned dashboard included a strip speedometer flanked by two round bezels, that on the T.I. housed a tachometer and oil and water temperature gauges. The T.I. also received a front side repeater mounted in a small spear, unlike the Normale which kept the earlier small round lamp mounted near the windshield with no decorations; this later moved down and forward, to sit behind the headlight. During 1959 the type designation for all models was changed from 750 and 753 to 101. In 1961 a right-hand drive T.I. finally appeared; the model had been a strong seller in continental Europe and the United States and Alfa had not seen the need for an RHD variant earlier.

In February 1961 the 100,001st Giulietta Berlina rolled off the Portello factory, with a celebration sponsored by Italian actress Giulietta Masina.

=== 1961 restyling ===
In Autumn 1961, the Giulietta was updated a second time. Both Normale and T.I. had revised engines and new exhaust systems; output rose to 62 PS (46 kW; 61 bhp) and 74 PS (54 kW; 73 bhp) respectively. With this new engine the car could reach a speed of almost 160 km/h (99 mph). At the front of the car square mesh side grilles were now pieced together with the centre shield, and at the rear there were larger tail lights. Inside the T.I. had individual instead of bench seats, with storage nets on the seatbacks.

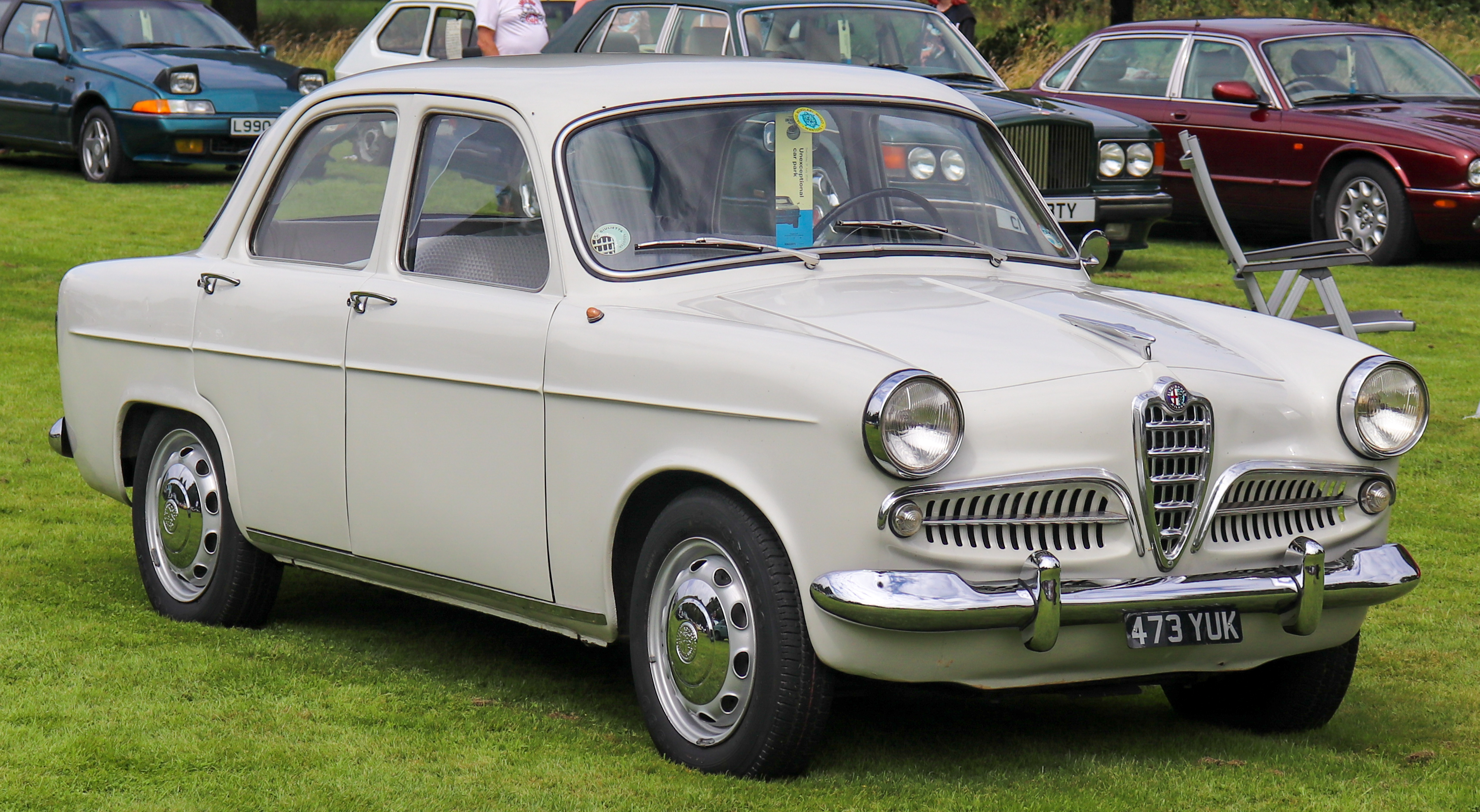
1957 Giulietta Berlina Normale (Series I)

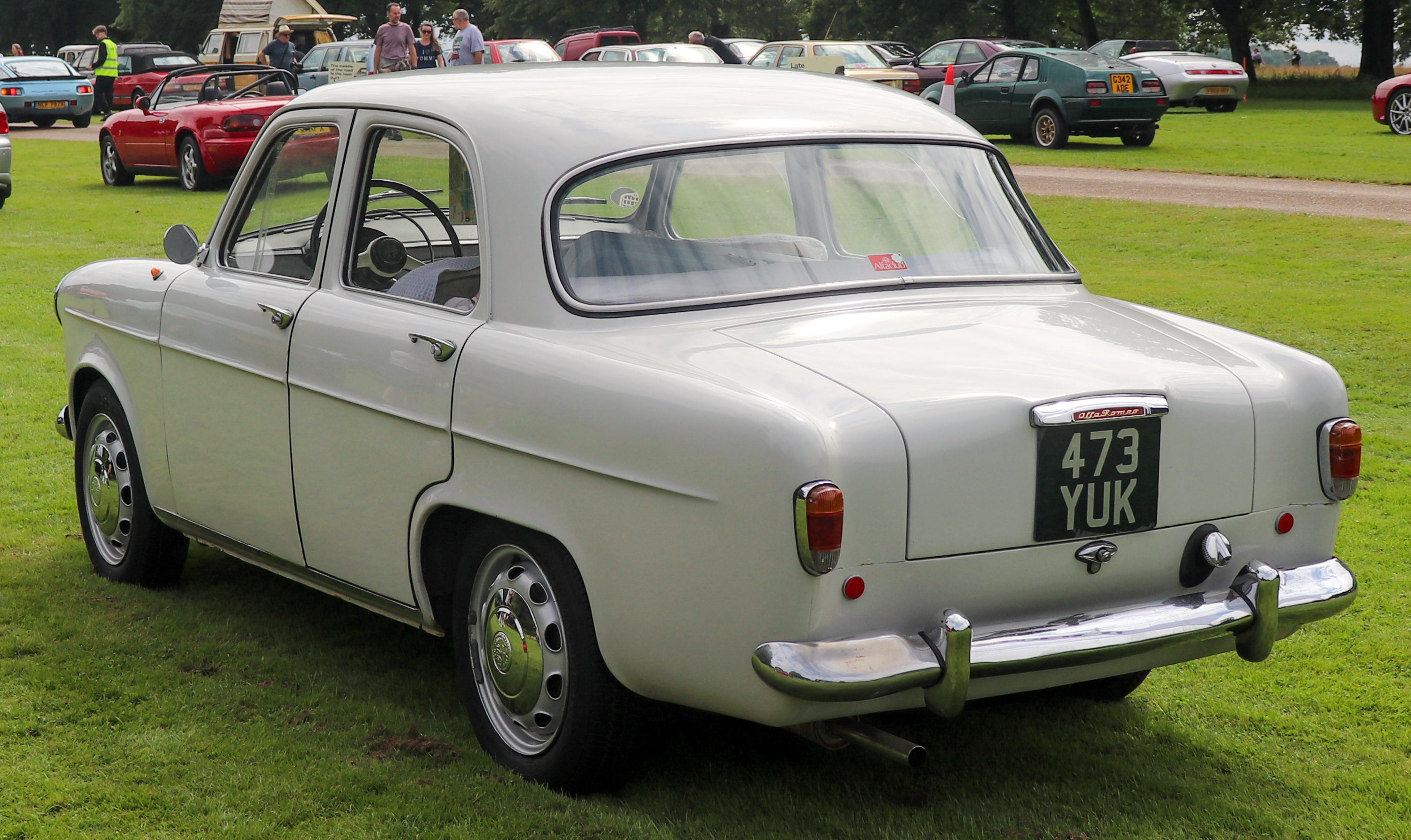
Series I Berlina; rear view

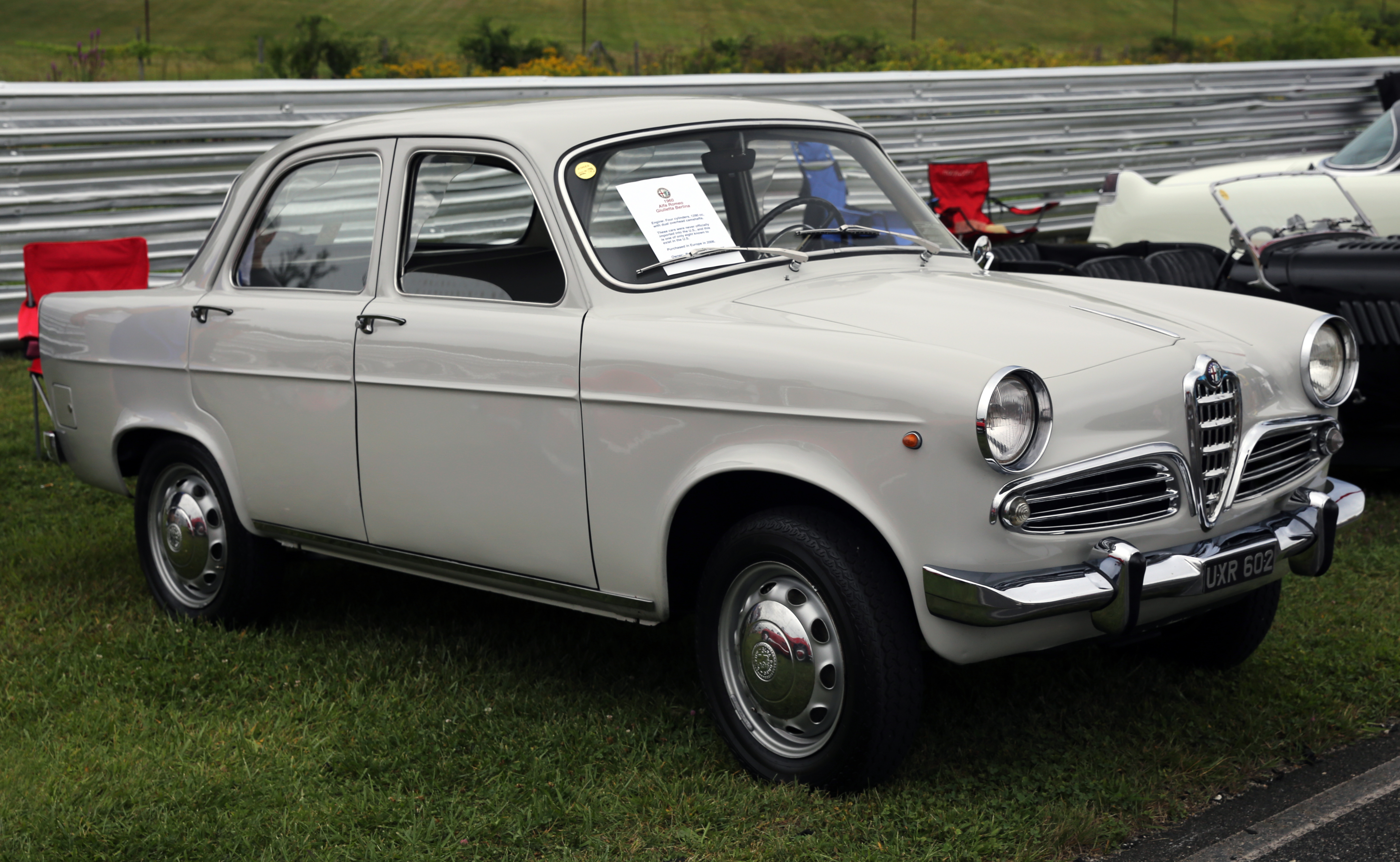
Second series Giulietta Berlina Normale

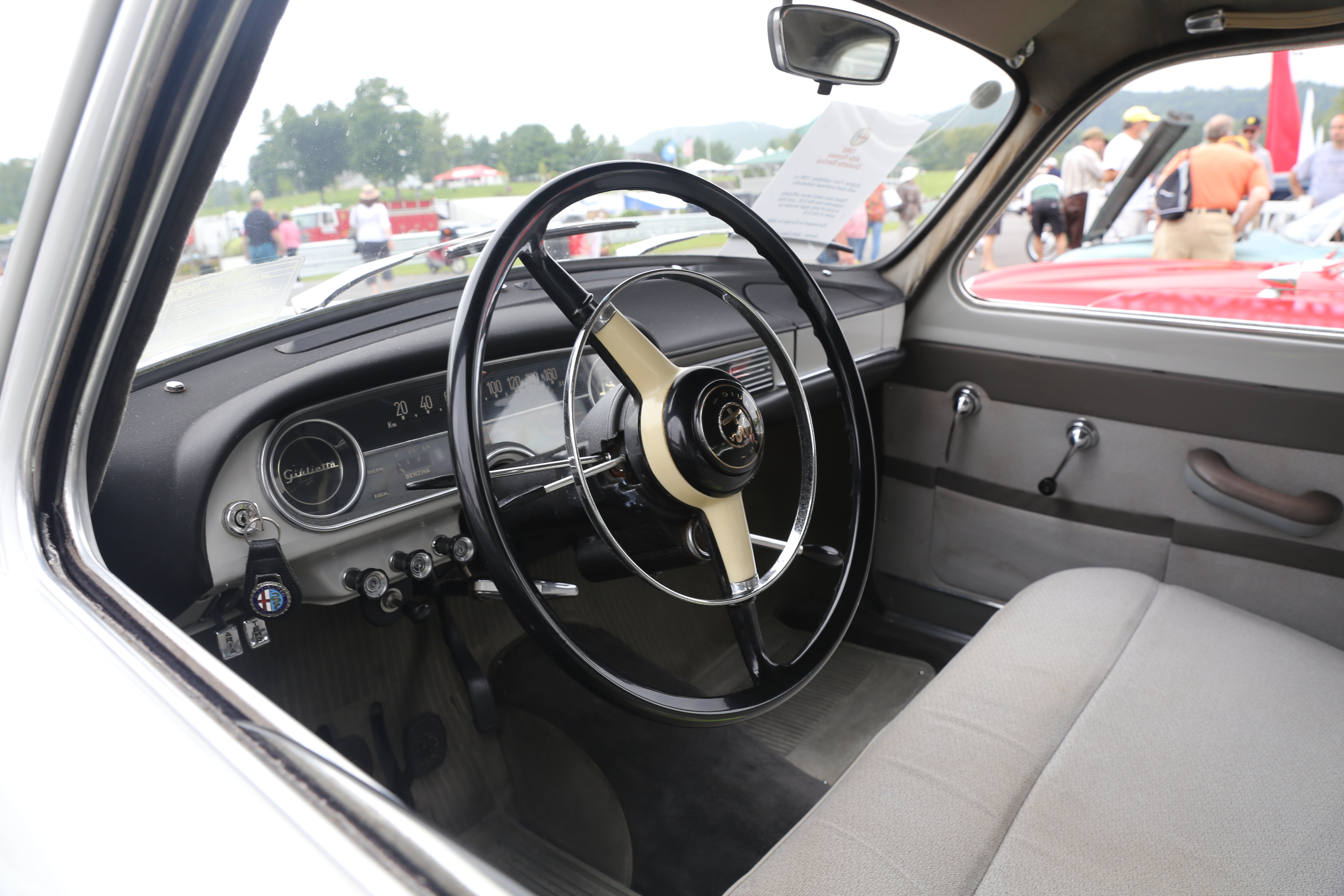
1960 Giulietta Berlina Normale interior (Series II)

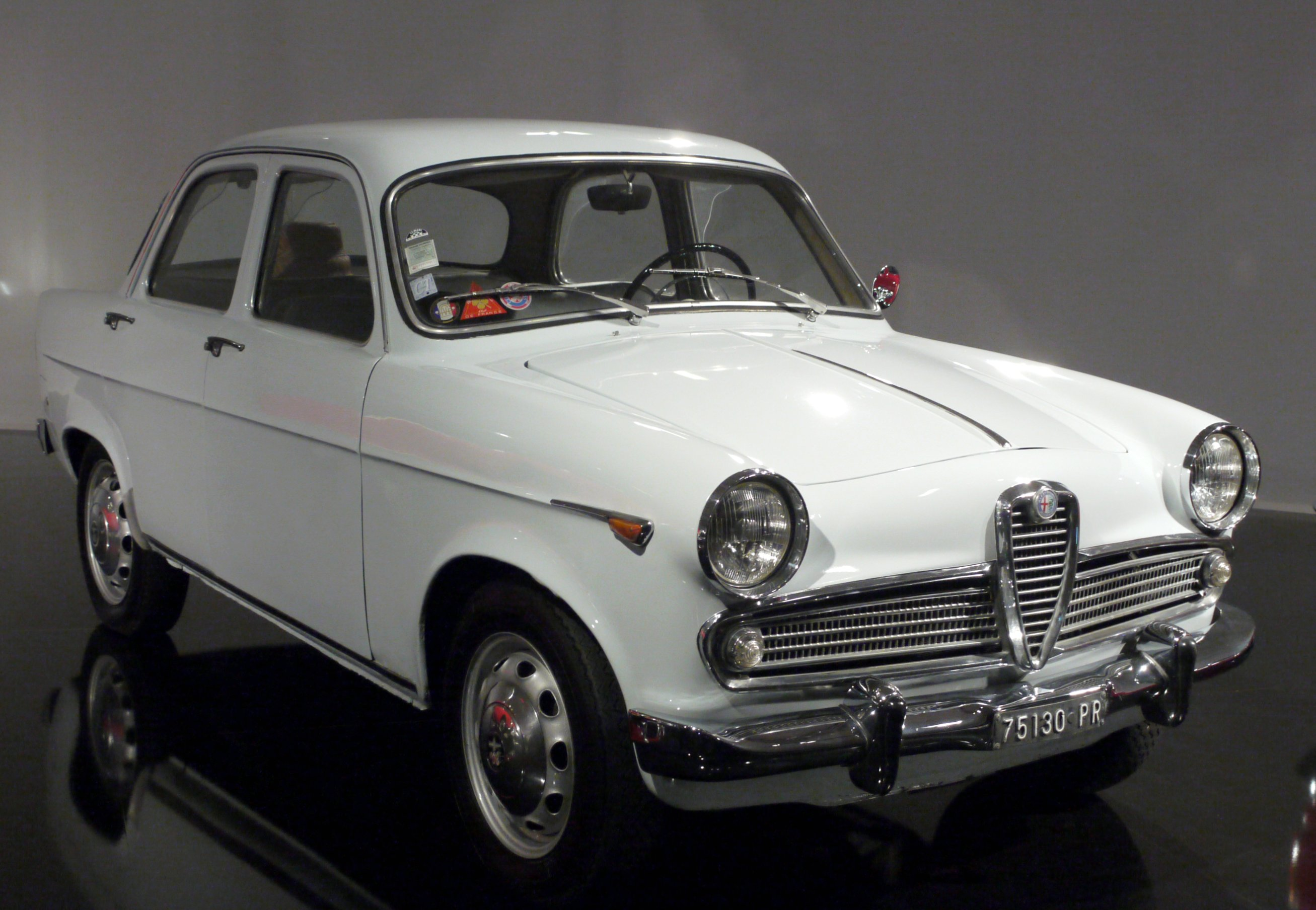
Third series Giulietta T.I.

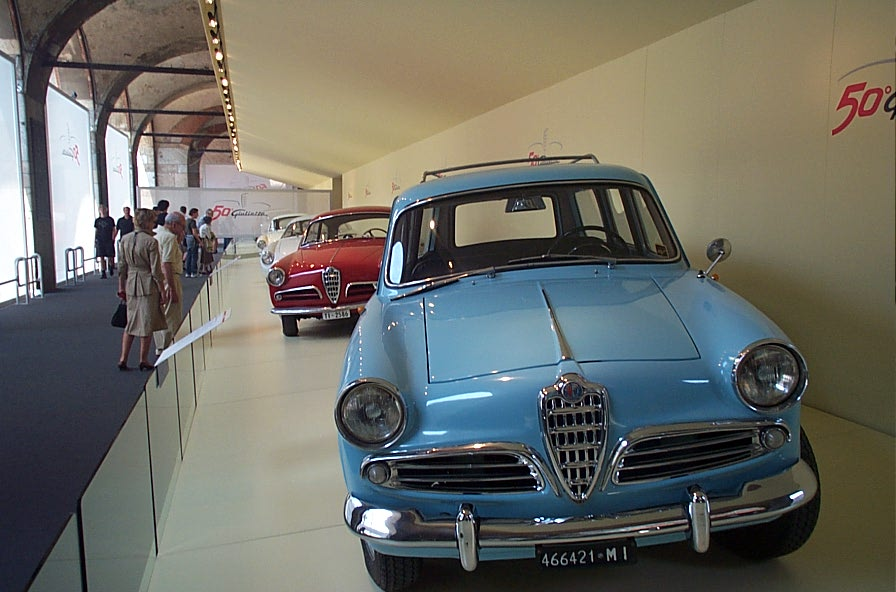
1960 Giulietta Colli Promiscua (estate)

June 1962 saw the introduction of the Alfa Romeo Giulia, which would eventually replace the Giulietta. As until 1964 the Giulia only had a larger 1.6-litre engine, production of the standard Berlina continued until then, whilst the T.I. continued for a full year more. A last T.I. was completed in 1965. The Giulietta sport models had a different fate: Sprint, Sprint Speciale and Spider were fitted with the new 1.6-litre engine, received some updates and continued to be sold under the Giulia name until they were replaced by all-new Giulia-based models during 1965.

== Giulietta Spider ==
Max Hoffman, Alfa Romeo's American East Coast importer requested a convertible version of the Giulietta Sprint, committing to a significant purchase (2,600 Giuliettas overall). Alfa Romeo charged Bertone and Pinin Farina with developing competing designs, with the more sober-looking Pinin Farina design winning out. Bertone's dramatic design, penned by Franco Scaglione, built on the design of the earlier 2000 Sportiva Coupé, with a sharp nose with covered headlights and prominent tailfins. The front design presaged that of the later Duetto. While Hoffman favored the Pinin Farina option, he did purchase the Bertone prototype for his own personal use.

At the October 1955 Paris Salon, the open two-seat Giulietta Spider made its official debut, using the Sprint's 65 PS (48 kW; 64 hp) engine and a shortened, 2,200 mm (86.6 in) wheelbase. Hoffman received the first 600 examples built, meaning that the Spider was available to American buyers for quite some time before Italians were able to get their hands on one. Early production examples were quite different from later cars. While the prototype had a panoramic windshield à la the Lancia Aurelia B24 Spider, early production cars had a simpler, curved front windshield along with roll-down windows but no quarter lights. The Paris Show car also had conical bumper guards at the front, and differing instrumentation which carried over to pre-series cars, most of which also had column-mounted shifters. On 750-series Spiders, the dashboard was made from sheet metal (with a thin black vinyl pad on top) and the glove compartment had no door. The steering wheel was a two-spoke affair with a horn ring. In 1957, doors with fixed quarter lights were introduced, but Alfa Romeo still installed the old style doors on occasion until 1959.

The Spider underwent the same mechanical revisions as the Giulietta Sprint over the years, including the eventual availability of more powerful Spider Veloce variants. The 101-series Giulietta Spider (Series II) debuted at the September 1959, Frankfurt Auto Show. Most easily distinguished by the round reflectors mounted beneath revised taillights and by the addition of a lid for the glove compartment, the 101 also received a 50 mm (2.0 in) longer wheelbase, with correspondingly longer doors for easier access to the cockpit. In 1961 the Series III arrived, with larger taillights, an ashtray near the shifter on the floor, and a cigarette lighter on the dashboard. The Spider was discontinued in 1962, shortly after the introduction of the larger-engined Giulia Spider. The Giulia Spider can be easily identified by a bump in the bonnet with a faux chromed vent at the leading edge, necessary to clear the somewhat taller 1570 cc engine.

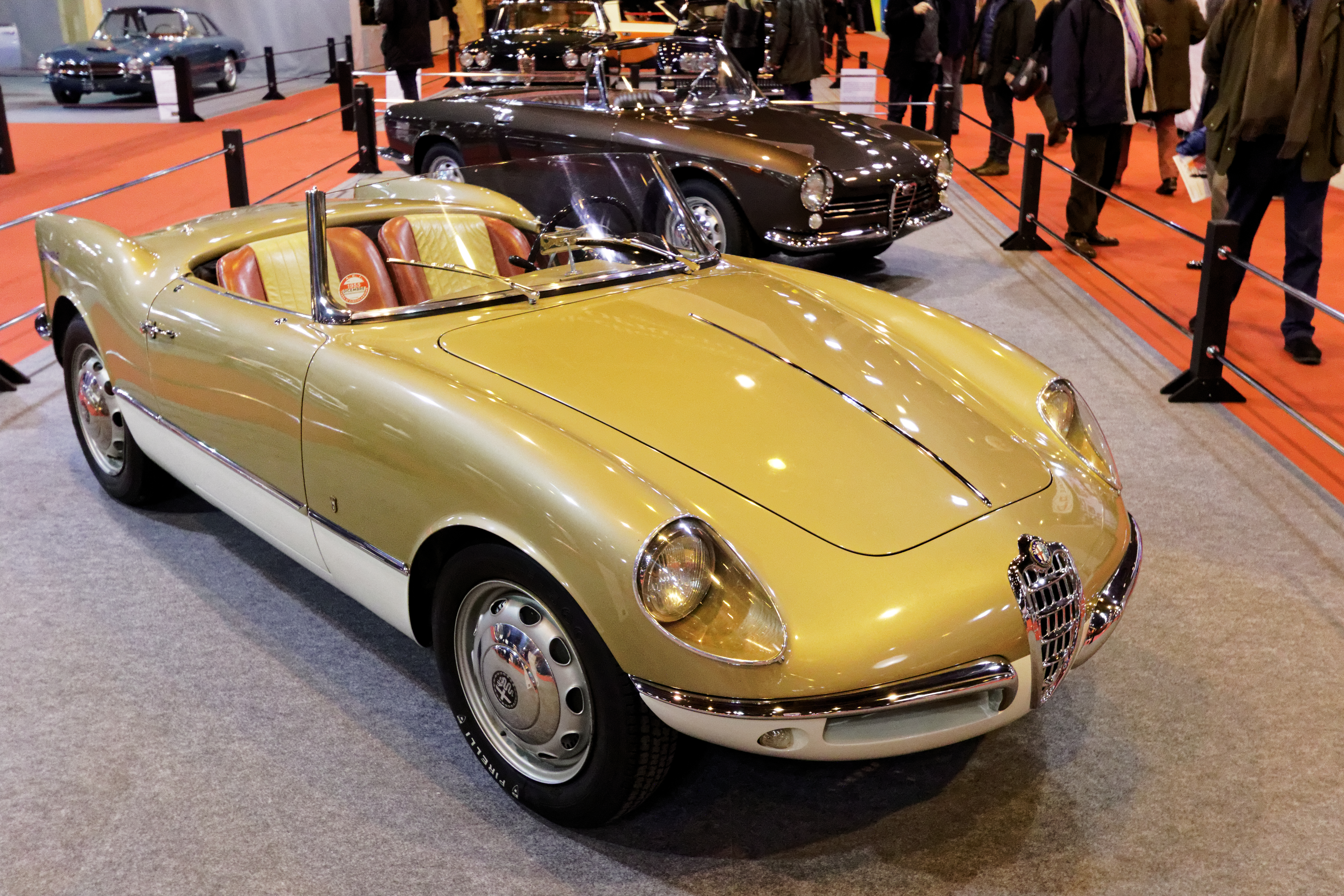
Bertone's Giulietta Spider prototype

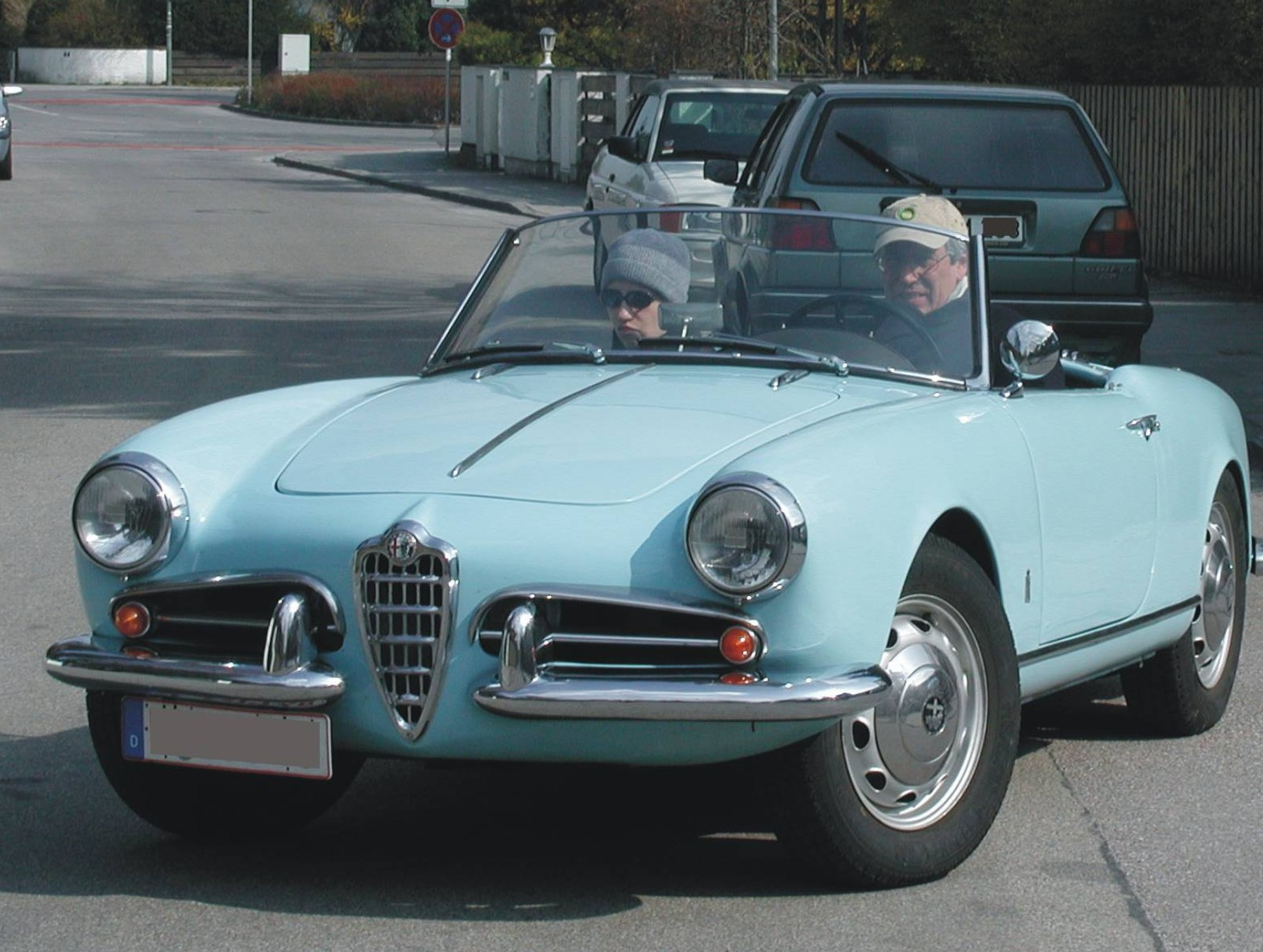
Giulietta Spider

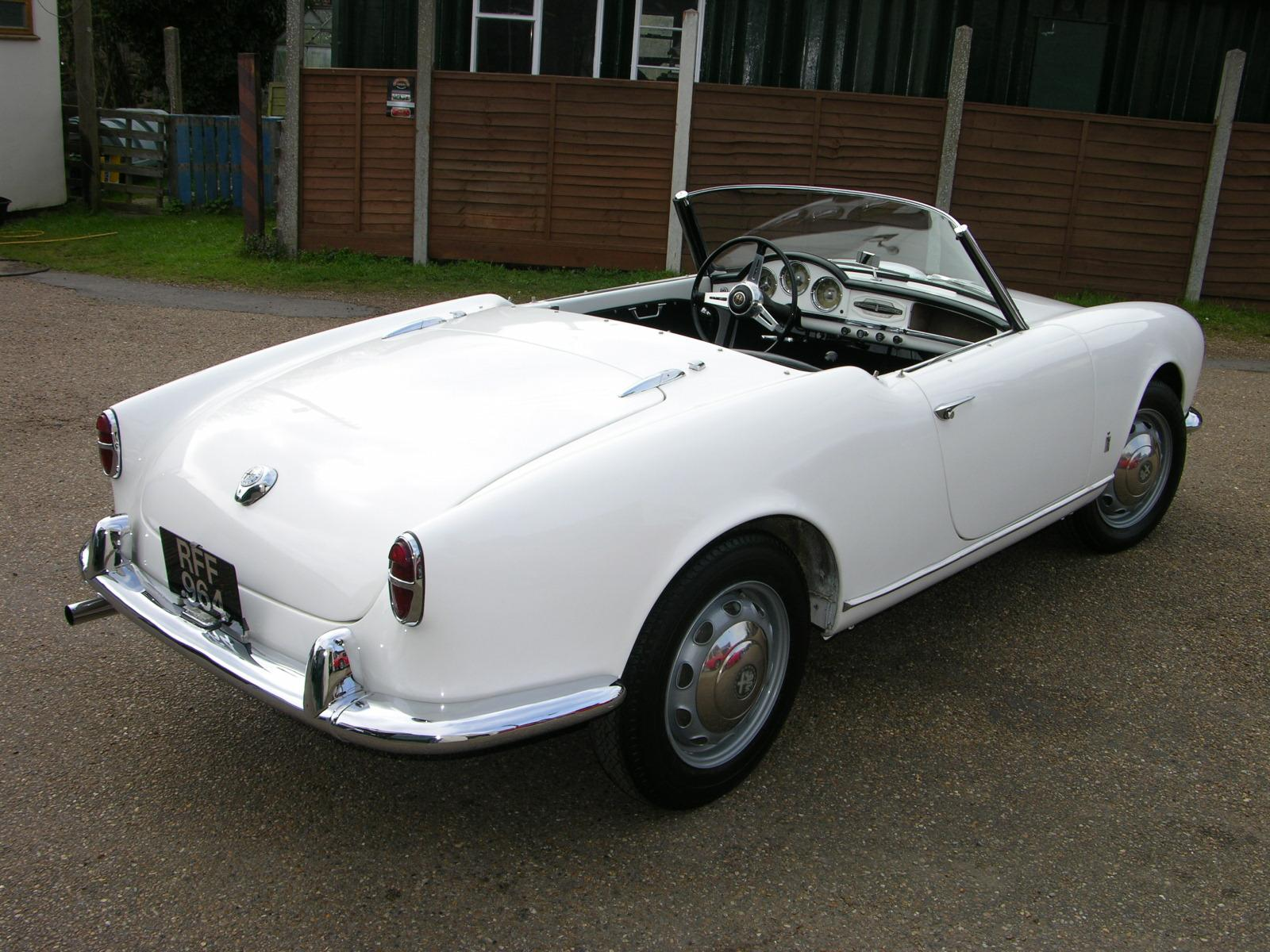
1956 Giulietta Spider (Series I; rear view)

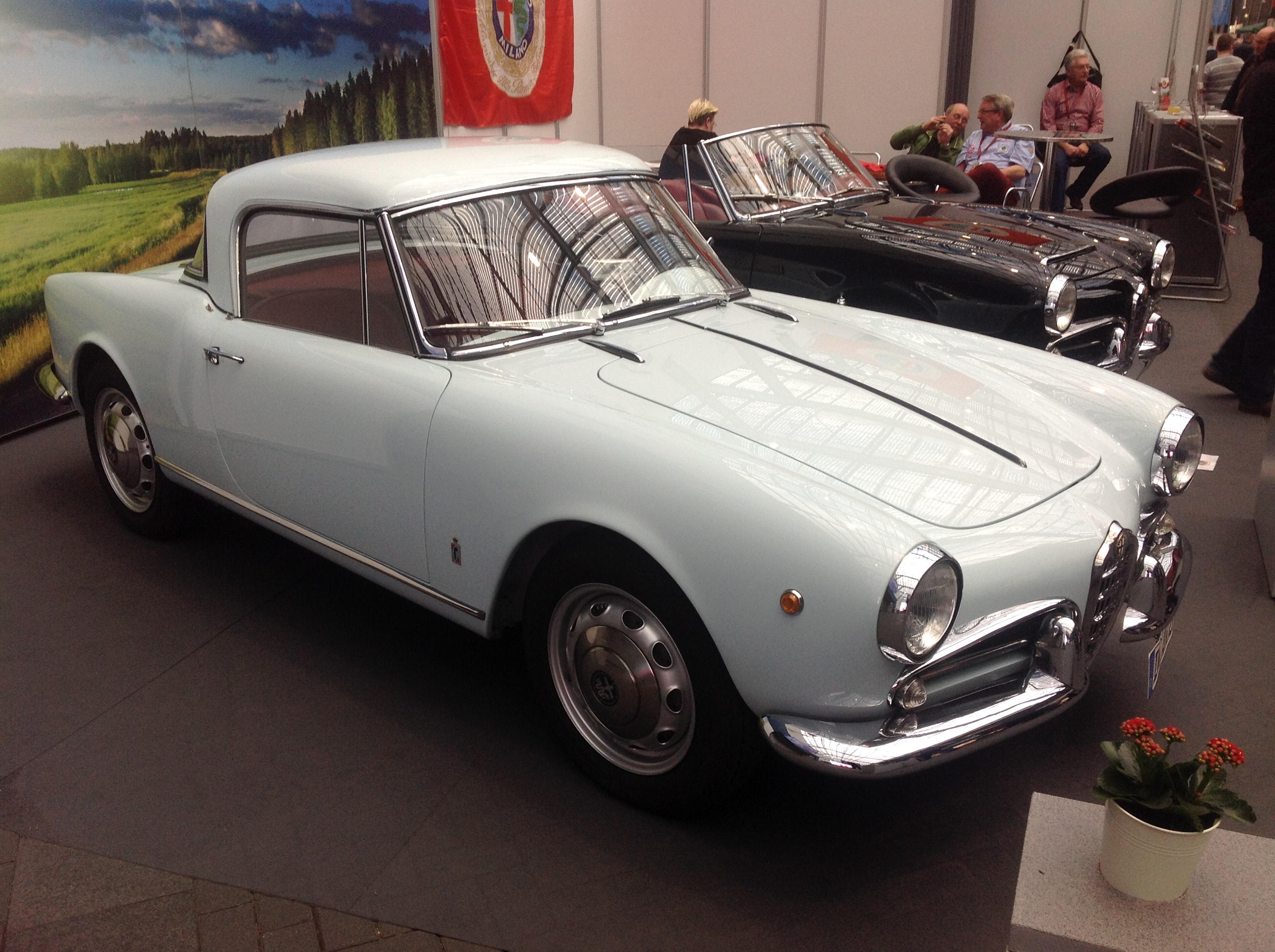
A rare factory hardtop was also available

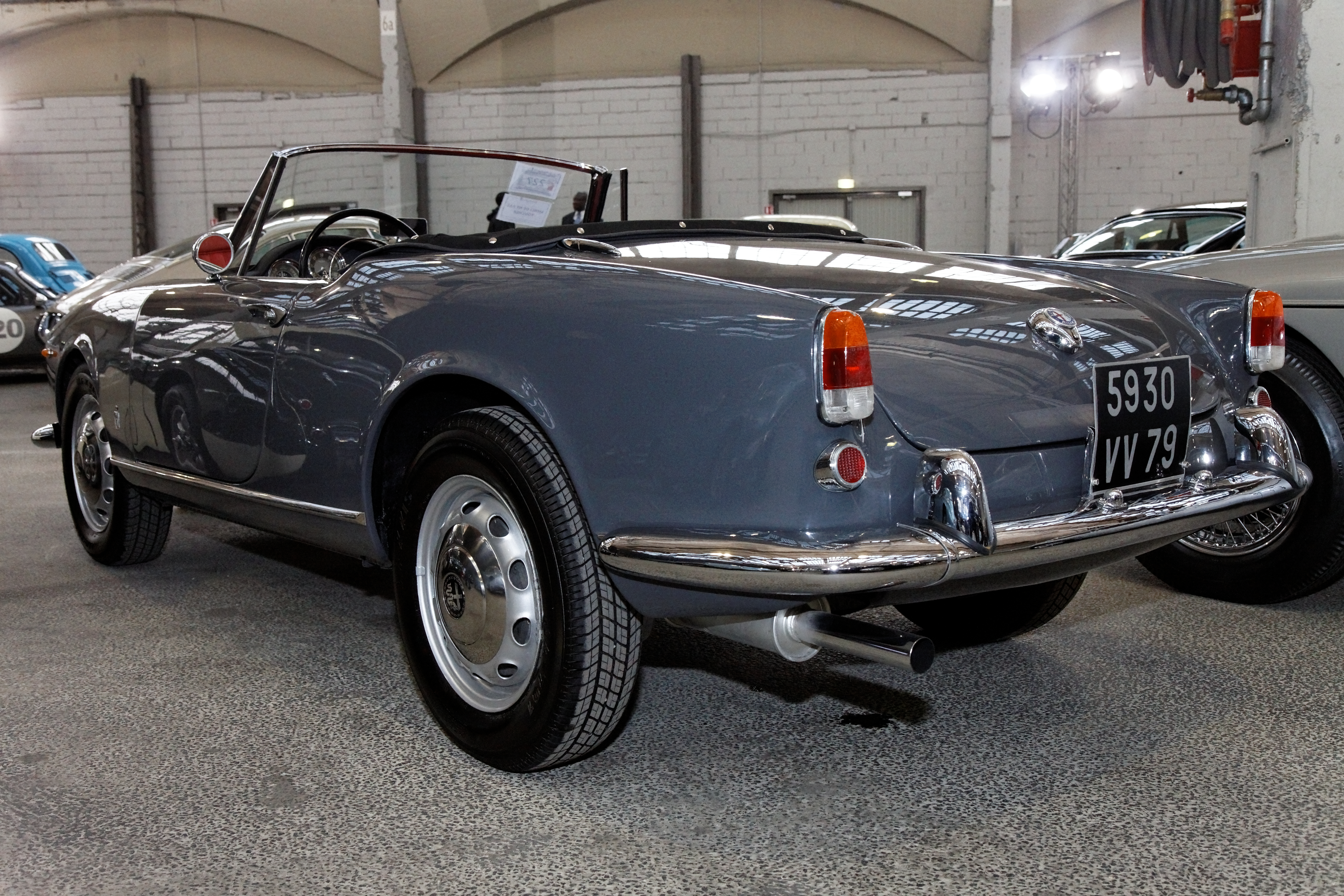
1960 Giulietta Spider (Series II; rear view)

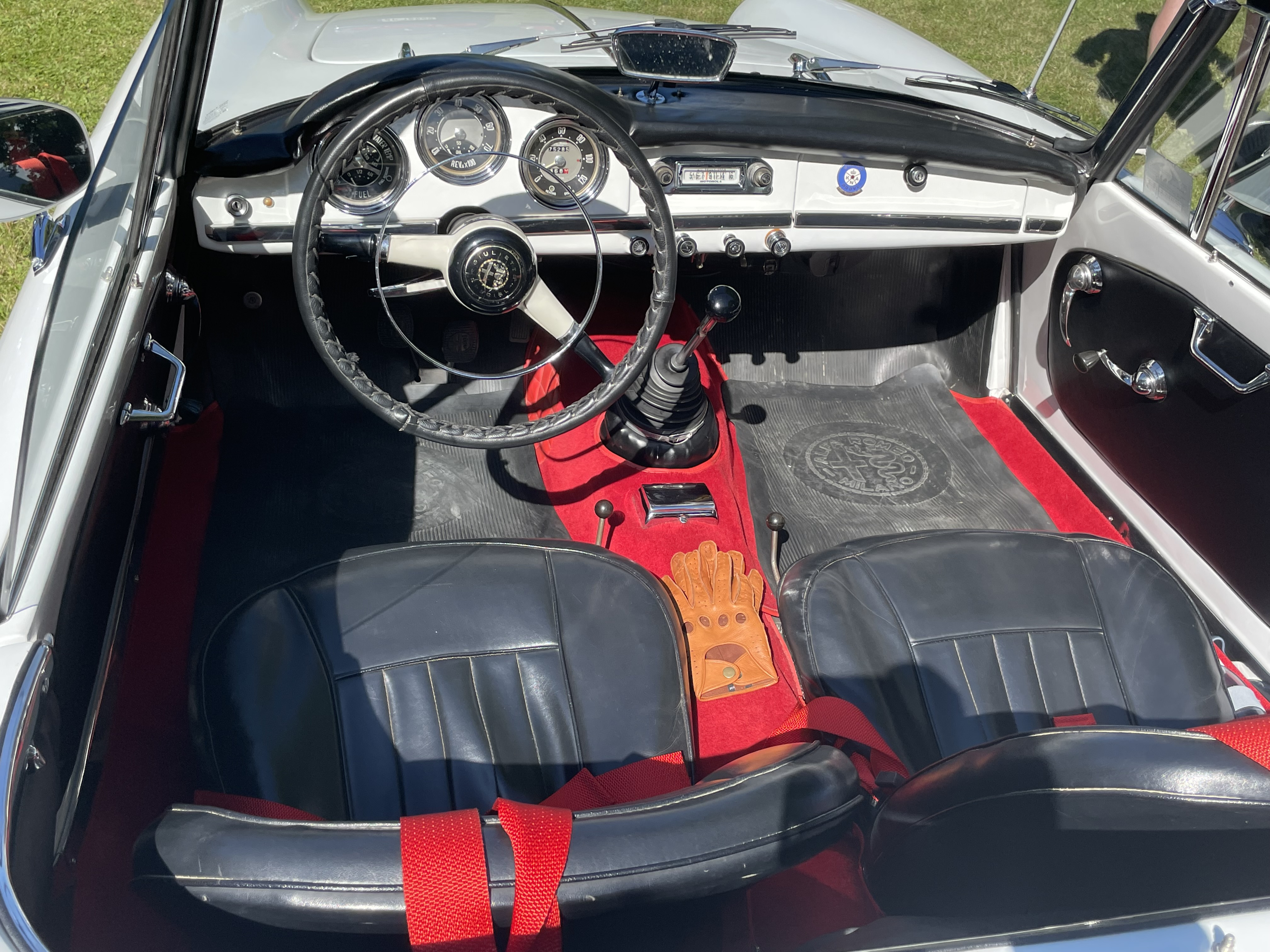
Series III interior, with ashtray and cigarette lighter

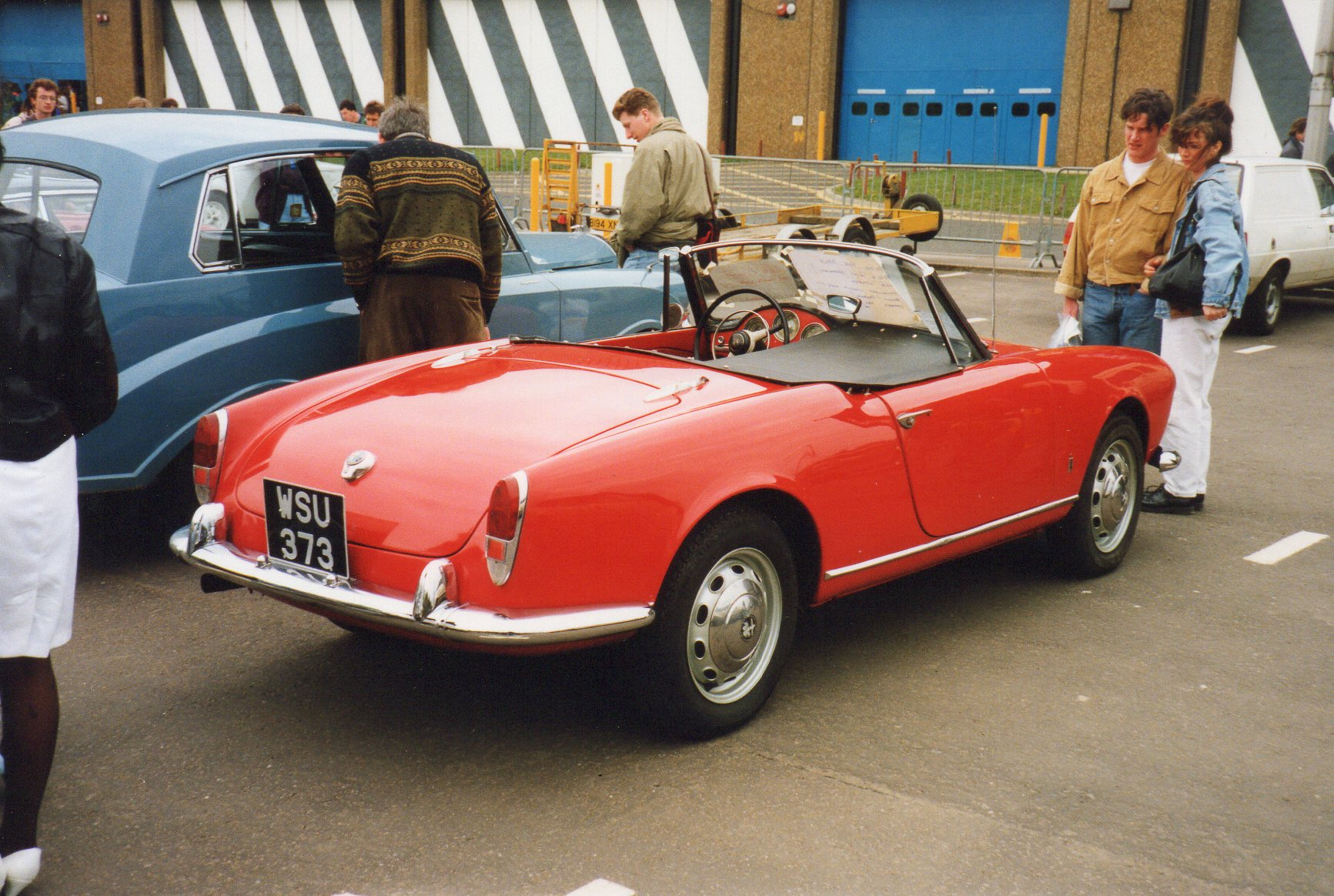
Series III rear view, showing larger taillights of the third type

== Specifications ==
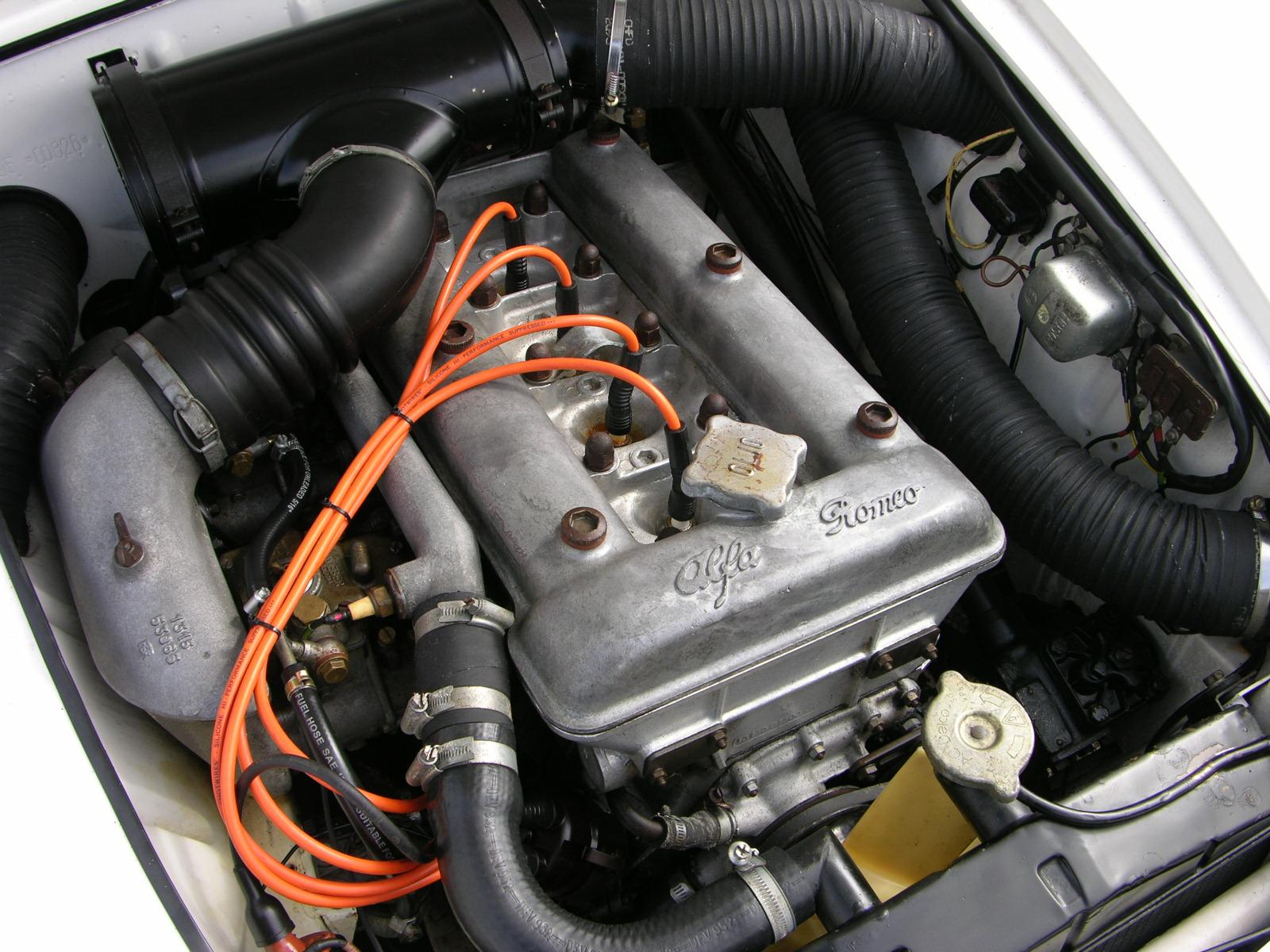
1956 Giulietta engine (Spider Normale)

The Alfa Romeo Giulietta used unibody construction and a front-engine, rear-wheel-drive layout. Front suspension was by control arms, with coaxial coil springs and hydraulic dampers. At the rear there was a solid axle on coil springs and hydraulic dampers. The axle was located by a longitudinal link on each side, and by a wishbone-shaped arm linking the top of the aluminium differential housing to the chassis. All Giuliettas (save for the last SZ examples) had hydraulic drum brakes on all four corners.

=== Engines ===
The Giulietta used an Alfa Romeo Twin Cam straight-four of 1290 cc, with an aluminium alloy engine block and cast iron inserted sleeves. Bore and stroke measured 74.0 mm (2.91 in) and 75.0 mm (2.95 in). The aluminium alloy cylinder head was of a crossflow design and featured hemispherical combustion chambers. The double overhead camshafts were driven by two timing chains, and acted on two valves per cylinder, angled 80°. Power figures vary somewhat depending on source and ratings, with Alfa Romeo typically using Italian CUNA but also SAE Gross at times.

Alfa Romeo Giulietta, types and specifications
| Model | Years | Compr. ratio | Carburettor(s) | Peak power | Top speed | Tipo |
|---|---|---|---|---|---|---|
| Giulietta Berlina (Note: The Giulietta Promiscua typically used the Berlina Normale's underpinnings; it was coded 750C until 1959 and then Tipo 101.22) | 1955–61 | 7.5:1 | 1 downdraught single-choke | 50–53 PS (37–39 kW; 49–52 bhp) at 5,200 rpm | 135 km/h (84 mph) | 750C/101.00 |
| Giulietta Berlina | 1961–63 | 7.5:1 | 1 downdraught single-choke | 62 PS (46 kW; 61 bhp) at 6,000 rpm | 140 km/h (87 mph) | 101.28 |
| Giulietta T.I. | 1957–61 | 8.0:1 | 1 downdraught twin-choke | 65 PS (48 kW; 64 bhp) at 5,500 rpm | 150 km/h (93 mph) | 753/101.11; RHD: 101.09; US: 101.13 |
| Giulietta T.I. | 1961–64 | 8.5:1 | 1 downdraught twin-choke | 74 PS (54 kW; 73 bhp) at 6,200 rpm | 155 km/h (96 mph) | 101.29; RHD: 101.09 |
| Giulietta Sprint | 1954–56 | 8.0:1 | 1 downdraught twin-choke | 65 PS (48 kW; 64 bhp) at 6,000 rpm | 160 km/h (99 mph) | 750B |
| Giulietta Sprint | 1956–58 | 8.0:1 | 1 downdraught twin-choke | 70 PS (51 kW; 69 bhp) at 6,000 rpm | 160 km/h (99 mph) | 750B |
| Giulietta Sprint | 1958–62; 1964–65 | 8.5:1 | 1 downdraught twin-choke | 80 PS (59 kW; 79 bhp) at 6,300 rpm | 165 km/h (103 mph) | 750B/101.02; US: 101.05 |
| Giulietta Sprint Veloce | 1956–62 | 9.5:1 | 2 sidedraught twin-choke | 90 PS (66 kW; 89 bhp) at 6,000 rpm | 180 km/h (112 mph) | 750E/101.06; US: 101.24 |
| Giulietta Spider | 1955–56 | 8.0:1 | 1 downdraught twin-choke | 65 PS (48 kW; 64 bhp) at 6,000 rpm | 160 km/h (99 mph) | 750D |
| Giulietta Spider | 1956–58 | 8.0:1 | 1 downdraught twin-choke | 70 PS (51 kW; 69 bhp) at 6,000 rpm | 160 km/h (99 mph) | 750D |
| Giulietta Spider | 1958–62 | 8.5:1 | 1 downdraught twin-choke | 80 PS (59 kW; 79 bhp) at 6,300 rpm | 165 km/h (103 mph) | 750D/101.03; US: 101.04 |
| Giulietta Spider Veloce | 1956–62 | 9.5:1 | 2 sidedraught twin-choke | 90 PS (66 kW; 89 bhp) at 6,000 rpm | 180 km/h (112 mph) | 750F/101.07; US: 101.25 |
| Giulietta Sprint Speciale | 1959–63 | 9.7:1 | 2 sidedraught twin-choke | 100 PS (74 kW; 99 bhp) at 6,500 rpm | 193 km/h (120 mph) | 101.20; US: 101.17 |
| Giulietta Sprint Zagato | 1960–63 | 9.7:1 | 2 sidedraught twin-choke | 100 PS (74 kW; 99 bhp) at 6,500 rpm | 200 km/h (124 mph) | 101.26 |

== Production ==
Overall production figures were:

- Berlina 39,057
- Berlina TI 92,728
- Sprint 24,084
- Sprint Veloce 3,058
- Spider 14,300
- Spider Veloce 2,796
- Promiscua (wagon) 91

| Year | 1954 | 1955 | 1956 | 1957 | 1958 | 1959 | 1960 | 1961 | 1962 | 1963 | 1964 | 1965 | Sum |
|---|---|---|---|---|---|---|---|---|---|---|---|---|---|
| Berlina | 0 | 1,430 | 6,348 | 8,939 | 5,773 | 4,357 | 5,114 | 5,292 | 1,474 | 330 | 0 | 0 | 39,057 |
| Berlina TI | 0 | 0 | 0 | 1,268 | 9,948 | 10,599 | 16,589 | 19,855 | 14,740 | 11,164 | 5,244 | 1 | 89,408 |
| Berlina TI guida destra | 0 | 0 | 0 | 0 | 0 | 0 | 430 | 210 | 138 | 2 | 0 | 0 | 780 |
| Berlina TI CKD | 0 | 0 | 0 | 0 | 0 | 0 | 0 | 640 | 1,567 | 333 | 0 | 0 | 2,540 |
| Promiscua | 0 | 0 | 0 | 1 | 0 | 71 | 19 | 0 | 0 | 0 | 0 | 0 | 91 |
| Spider | 0 | 1 | 1,007 | 2,048 | 1,552 | 1,773 | 3,893 | 2,744 | 1,182 | 0 | 0 | 0 | 14,200 |
| Spider Veloce | 0 | 0 | 18 | 32 | 835 | 368 | 1,203 | 270 | 70 | 0 | 0 | 0 | 2,796 |
| Sprint | 12 | 1,415 | 1,855 | 2,115 | 1,504 | 3,606 | 5,558 | 4,962 | 1,157 | 289 | 1,282 | 329 | 24,084 |
| Sprint Veloce | 0 | 0 | 252 | 458 | 401 | 363 | 539 | 884 | 261 | 0 | 0 | 0 | 3,158 |
| Sprint Speciale | 0 | 0 | 0 | 5 | 11 | 195 | 200 | 742 | 213 | 0 | 0 | 0 | 1,366 |
| SZ (Sprint Zagato) | 0 | 0 | 0 | 1 | 0 | 0 | 61 | 112 | 36 | 0 | 0 | 0 | 210 |
| Sum | 12 | 2,846 | 9,480 | 14,867 | 20,024 | 21,332 | 33,606 | 35,711 | 20,838 | 12,118 | 6,526 | 330 | 177,690 |
Guida destra = right-hand drive; CKD = complete knock-down;

== See also ==
- Alfa Romeo Giulietta Sprint Speciale
