= Carrozzeria Colli =

Italian coachbuilding company

The Milanese coachbuilder Carrozzeria Colli was established by Giuseppe Colli in 1931 and included his four sons, Mario, Candido, Beniamino and Tarcisio. The company was specialized in using aluminium its works. The first automobiles it made were racing cars using Fiat 1100 mechanicals and chassis, also Fiat 500, Lancia Astura and Aprilia were used as basis. During the World War II the company worked for airforces and after the war made car bodies. After the war they made a couple of Alfa Romeo 6C 2500SS, (Fiat 6C 1500cc) Lancia Aprilia based cars and for the 1947 Villa d'Este a Fiat 500 barchetta.

Colli made one very special prototype in 1946, the Aerauto PL.5C roadable aircraft. From the 1950s it worked with Alfa Romeo making cars such as the 6C 3000CM and its own single variant of Disco Volante. The company also converted Alfa Romeo Giuliettas and Giulias into estate cars in the 1960s. In 1955 Colli constructed the very shortly used Arzani-Volpini Formula One car utilising a twin-supercharged Maserati 1500 inline-four engine.

Colli made car bodies until 1973.

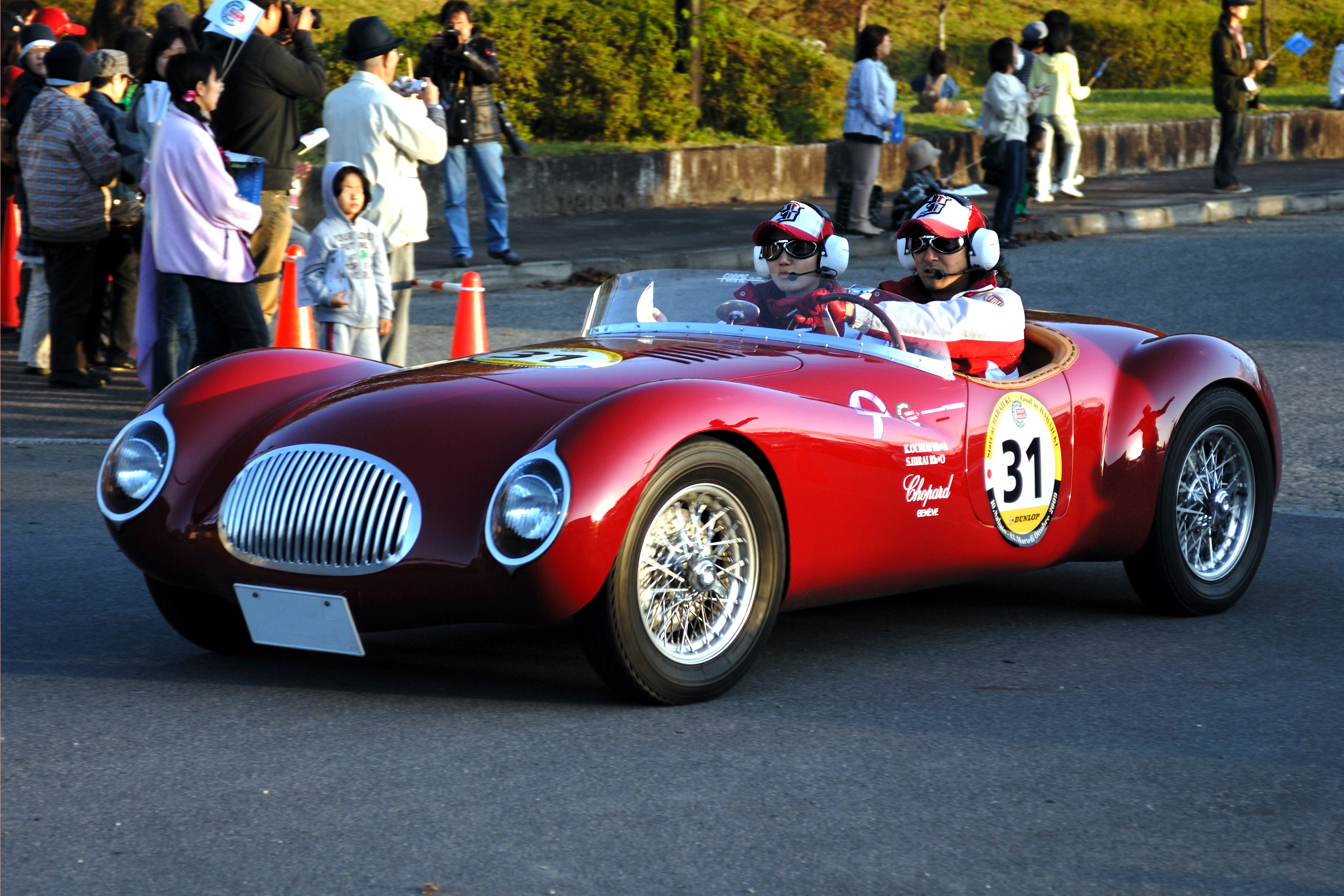
Fiat Roselli 1100 Sport by Colli

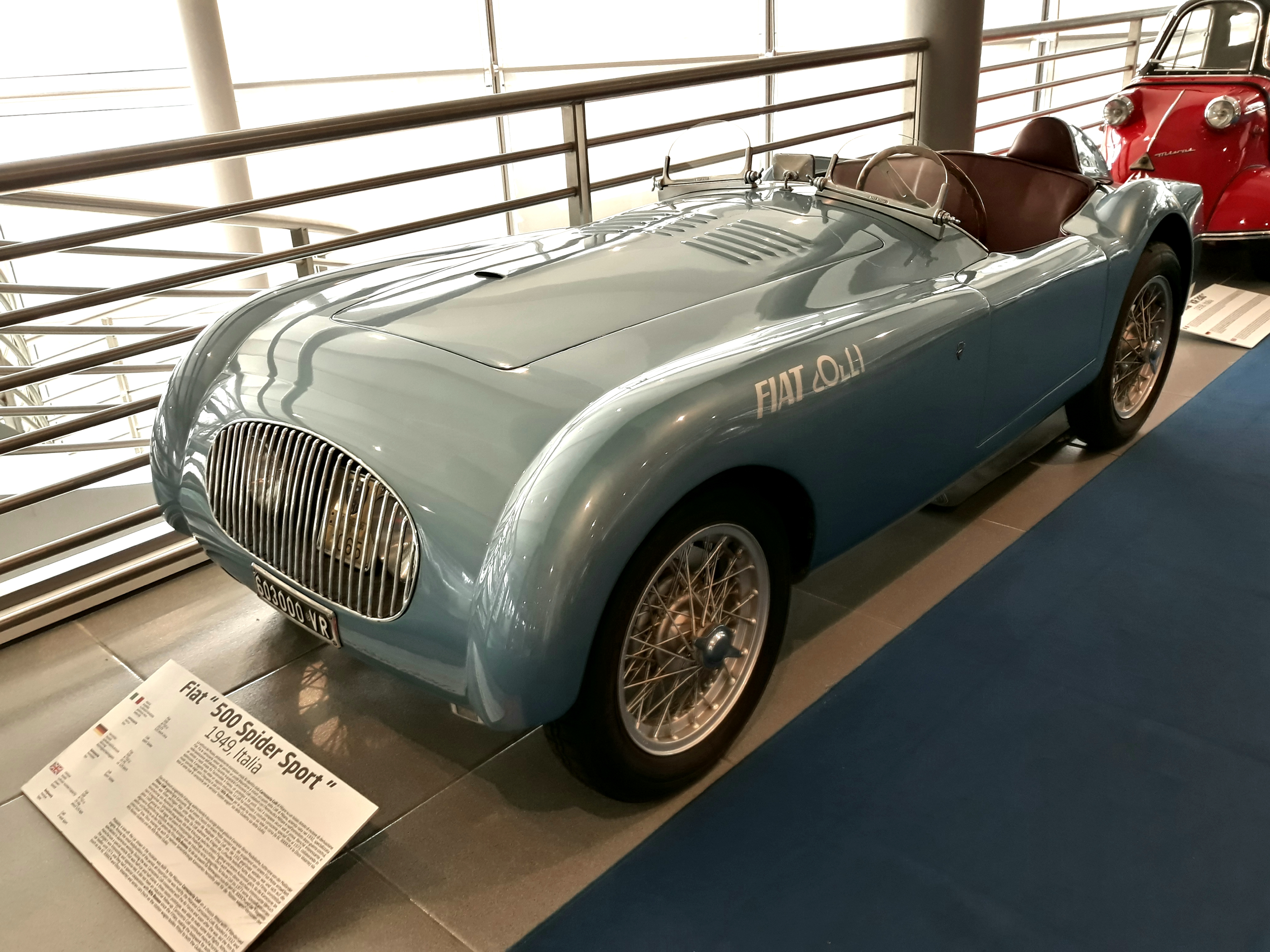
1949 Fiat 500 Spider Sport by Colli

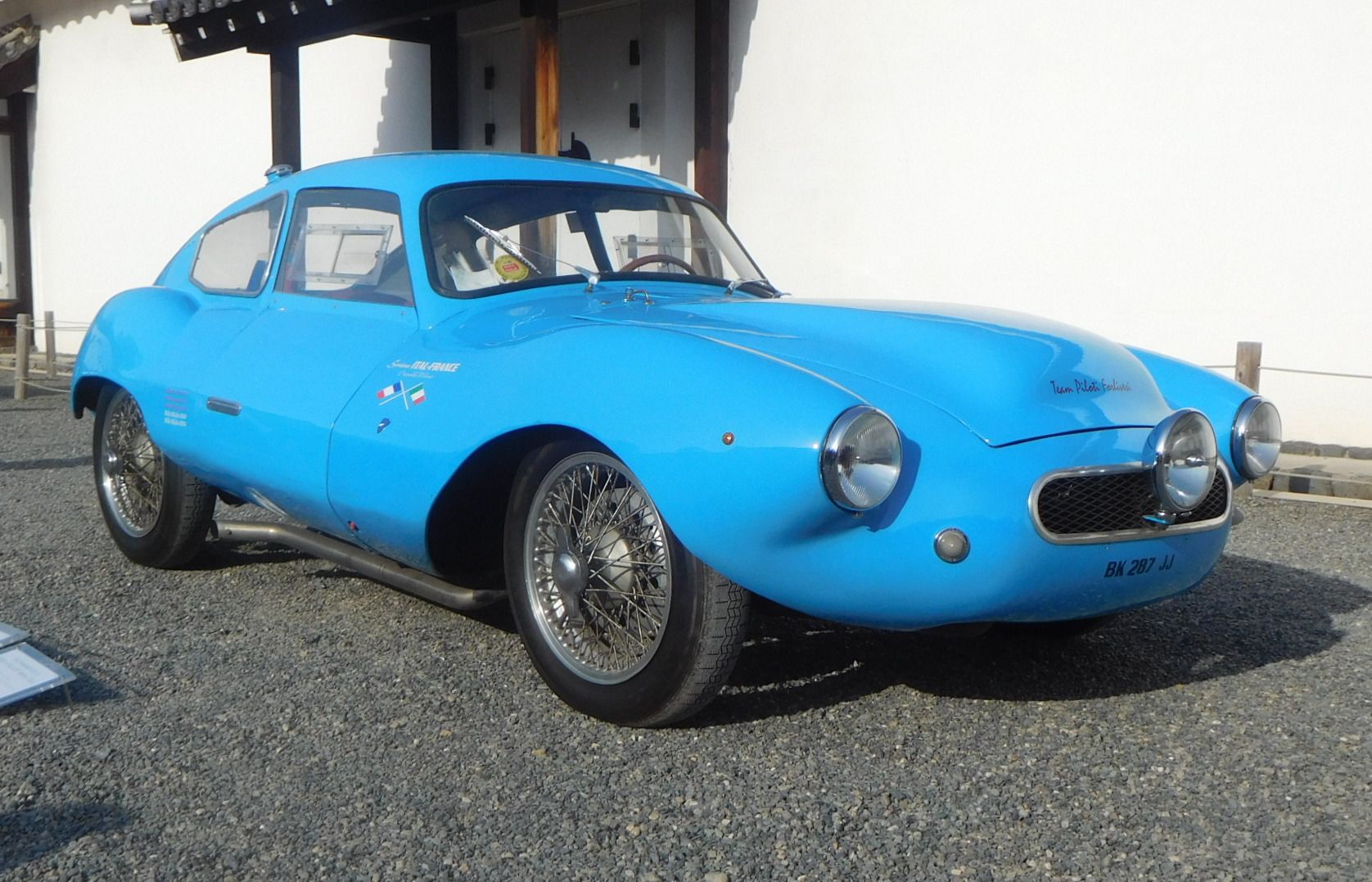
1952 Panhard Gilco "Disco Volante" MM by Colli

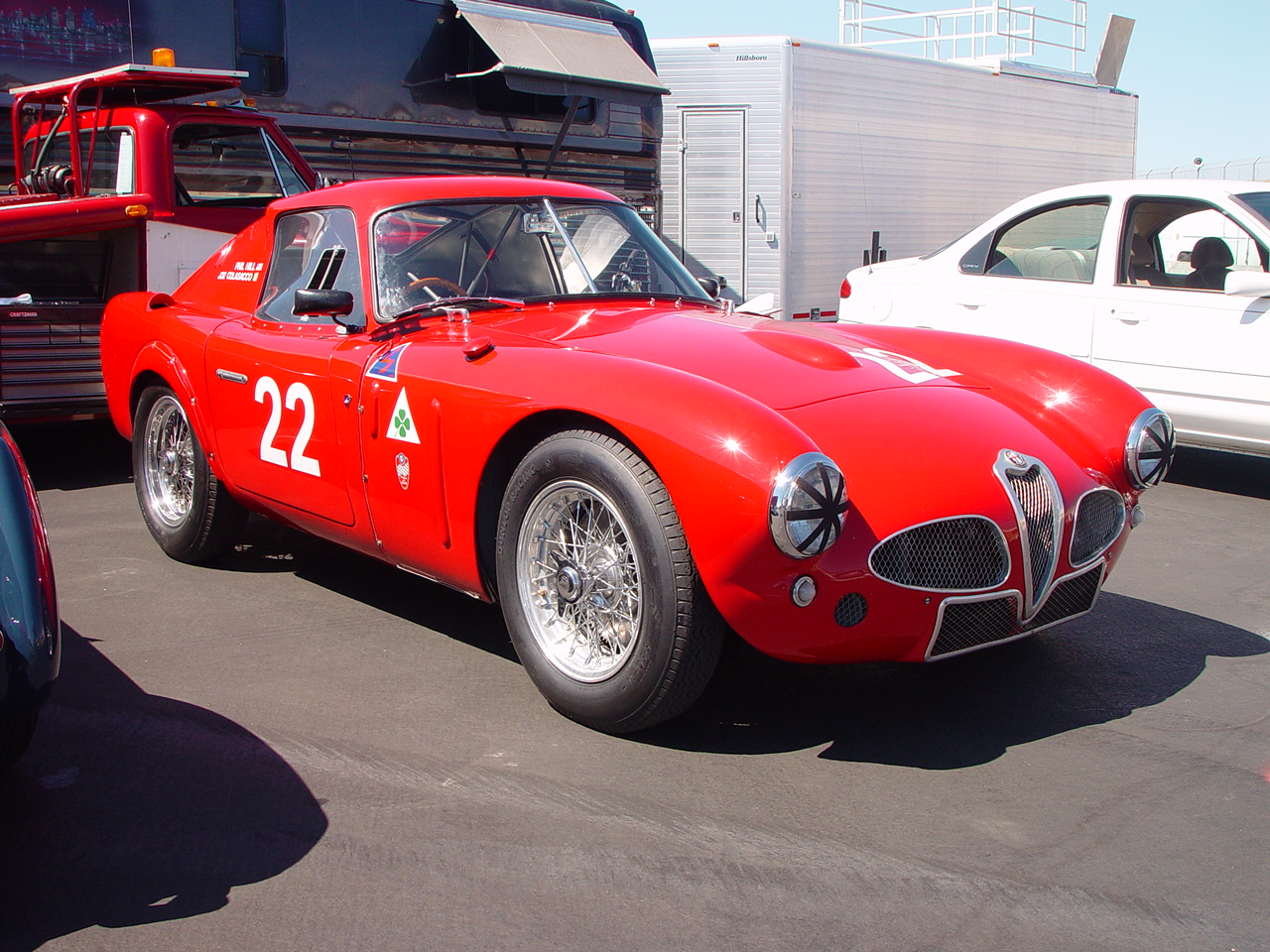
1953 Alfa Romeo 6C 3000 CM Coupe by Colli

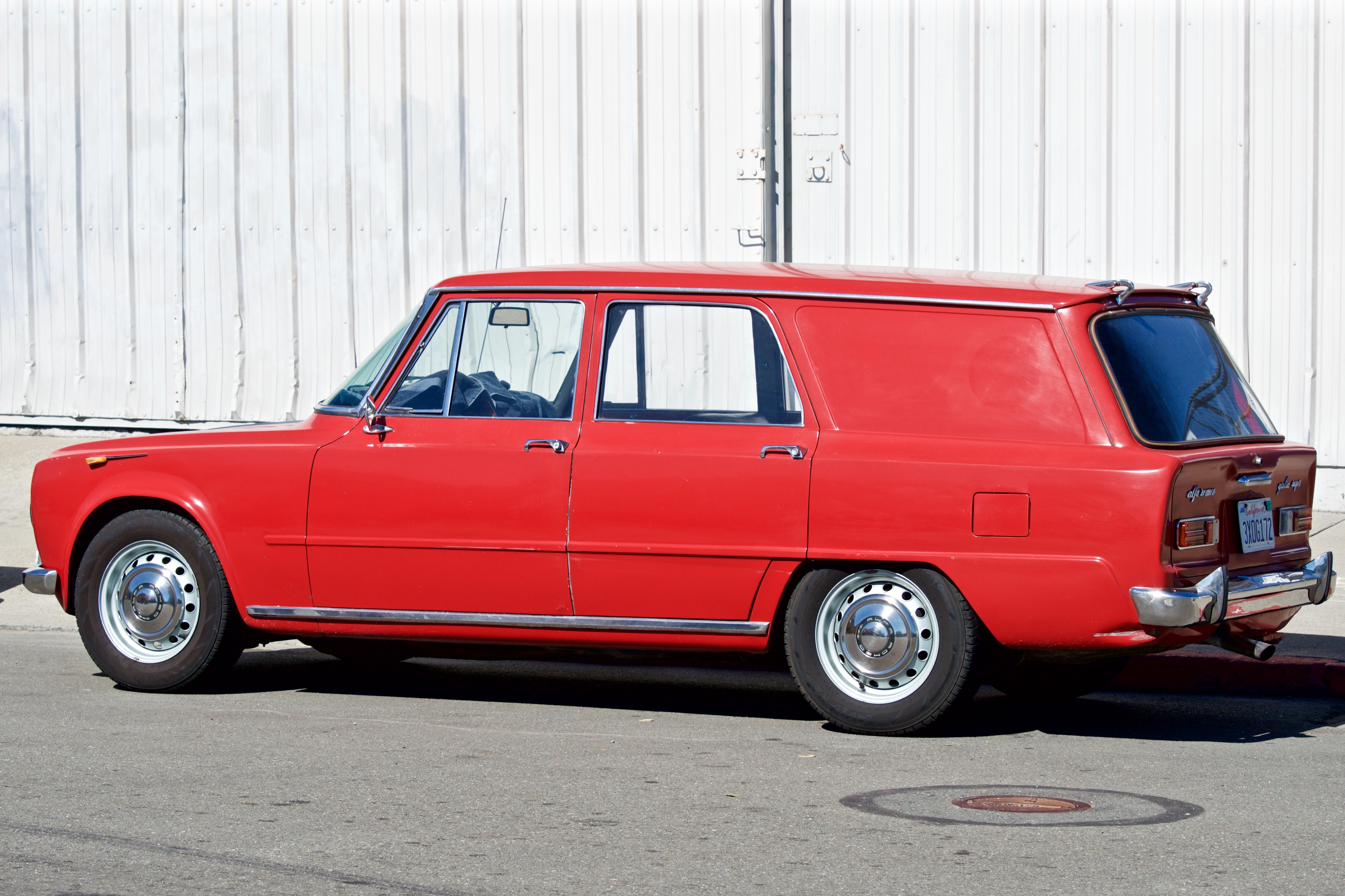
Alfa Romeo Giulia converted into a Giardiniera (station wagon) by Colli
