= Club dei Venti all'Ora =

- Abbreviation: C20HTS
- Formation: 1961
- Type: No-profit
- Legal status: Association
- Purpose: Classic Car club
- Location: Trieste (Italy)
- Members: private persons
- President: Andrea Sandrin (2026-2028)
- Parent organization: Fédération Internationale des Véhicules Anciens (FIVA)
- Website: http://www.clubdeiventiallora.org/

The "Club dei Venti all'Ora" is an Italian club of historic vehicle enthusiasts, founded in Trieste, Italy on March 5, 1961. A small and close-knit group of enthusiasts felt the need for uniting like-minded individual who had in common their love for "antique jewelry on four wheels". On January 8, 1966 "Club dei Venti all'Ora” was one of the first similar associations being affiliated to the newborn Italian Veteran Car Club (which subsequently became ASI, Automotoclub Storico Italiano).

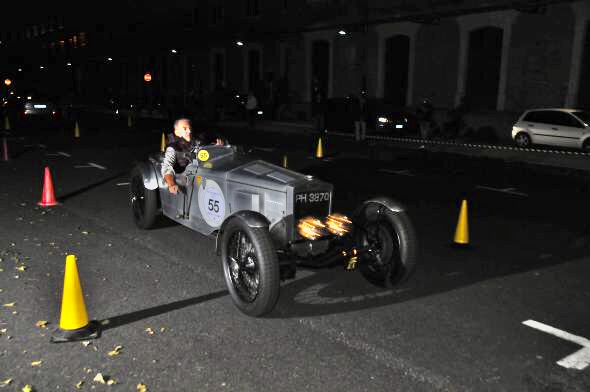
One of the Club-members in a night sprint included in the Trieste Opicina Historic 2013, the main event organized by the C20HTS

== Objectives ==
The Club is a non-profit organization and its goals are to promote love and interest for historic vehicles among the present and future generations, fostering research and encouraging the proper preservation and/or restoration of vintage vehicles.

Above all, the Club aims to support all its Members when using their vehicles or the purpose they were built for. Events and meetings are therefore planned and organized, favoring the social aspects of the sport and including lesser-known but highly interesting itineraries on mostly uncrowded roads of the Friuli Venezia Giulia and Istria regions. The Club also has a section dedicated to International Events.

== Activity ==
Meetings, raids, cultural itineraries and visits, conferences and regularity events or mild road competition. The Club was the organizational force behind seven editions of the Concours d’elegance "Castello di Miramare" and is now internationally known thanks to the historical re-enactment of the Trieste–Opicina Hillclimb–race, originally staged in Triest between 1911 and 1971. The Club is now the only keeper of the flame and custodian of the spirit of the now-defunct road race.
