= Alfa Romeo Portello Plant =

First Alfa Romeo factory

Coordinates: 45.490795°N 9.141494°E

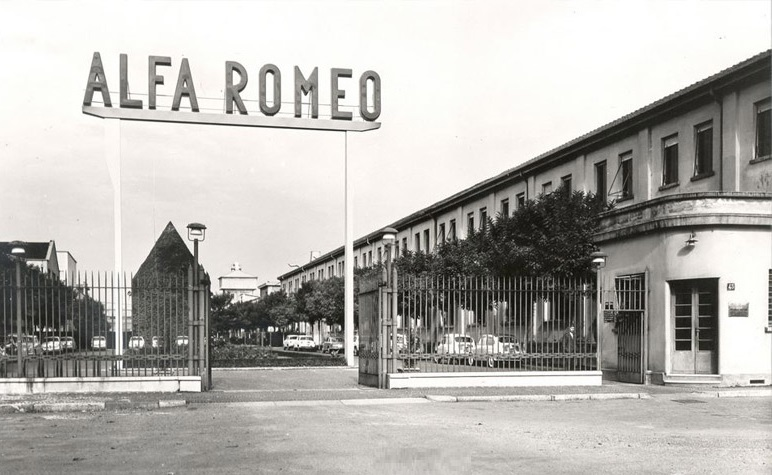
The entrance to the Alfa Romeo Portello plant in via Gattamelata in the 1960s.

The Alfa Romeo Portello Plant in Portello, Milan, Italy was the first Alfa Romeo factory, and the main factory between 1908 and the 1960s. The factory was closed in 1986 following FIAT's buyout of Alfa Romeo, but all major production had already been transferred 20 years earlier to the Alfa Romeo Arese Plant. The history of the factory is primarily involved in automobile manufacture, but over the years other products were manufactured as well.

== History ==
The first industrial plant was founded by the French company Darracq, which had decided to open a branch in Italy. The site chosen for that purpose was directly adjacent to areas that had hosted the 1906 International fair in Milan. The location was on Via Gattamelata in Milan, on the way to Gallarate, in the then extreme north-western outskirts of the city.

The same area was chosen by other car companies to establish their headquarters or branches, first Isotta Fraschini, then Citroën, FIAT, Carrozzeria Touring, Zagato and the Cesare Sala Bodyworks. The latter was essentially forced to choose that area because their activities were closely linked to those of Alfa.

In 1997 Gabriele Salvatores shot his 1997 film Nirvana (film) in the Plant. The factory buildings were subsequently demolished to make room to a green area. The city park inaugurated in 2011 as Parco del Portello. (Or Parco Industria Alfa Romeo)

== List of cars produced ==
Image	Brand	Model	Production start/end	Nr. produced	Note
	Darracq	8/10 HP and 14/16 HP	1906/1909		In 1909 the Darracq company ceased operation and the plant was purchased by a group of Milanese businessmen.
	A.L.F.A.	24 HP	1910/1913		The platform of the 24HP was the basis for a family of cars built before 1921 as the 12HP, 15HP, 40-60 HP, 15-20 HP and 20-30 HP.
	A.L.F.A.	12 HP	1910/1911		
	A.L.F.A.	15 HP	1911/1913		
	A.L.F.A.	40-60 HP	1913/1914		
	A.L.F.A.	15-20 HP	1913/1914		
	A.L.F.A. - Alfa Romeo	20-30 HP	1914/1921	124	Produced until 1918 as A.L.F.A.
	Alfa Romeo	G1	1921/1923		
	Alfa Romeo	RL	1922/1927		
	Alfa Romeo	RM	1923/1925	circa 500	
	Alfa Romeo	6C	1925/1954		
	Alfa Romeo	8C	1931/1939		
	Alfa Romeo	1900	1950/1959	17,243	The 1900 was assembled under license in Belgium by "Empire" from 1953 to 1954 and in Argentina by "Industrias Kaiser Argentina" from 1960 to 1962.
	Alfa Romeo	Matta	1951/1955	2,161	
	Alfa Romeo	Alfa Romeo Giulietta	1955/1963	circa 132,000	The Spider and coupe versions were built at the Pininfarina plant respectively at San Giorgio Canavese (Turin) and Grugliasco (Torino). They were also assembled in South Africa in East London from 1960 to 1963.
	Alfa Romeo 2000	2000	1958/1961	6,961	The 2000 was built in Brazil until 1969 by the Fabrica Nacional de Motores, Brazilian subsidiary of Alfa Romeo, with the name of FNM 2000
	Alfa Romeo (Renault)	Dauphine	1959/1963		The Alfa Romeo produced this car under license on behalf of Renault. The differences from the French model were limited to the electrical system 12V (Magneti-Marelli) and the presence of the trademark "Alfa Romeo" on the trunk.
	Alfa Romeo	2600	1961/1968	11,453	The 2600 was also assembled in South Africa in East London from 1963 to 1968.
	Alfa Romeo	Giulia	1962/1965		In 1965 production was transferred to the new Alfa Romeo Arese Plant in Milan.
