= ALFA 15/20 HP =

Italian car model made- 1914-1920

A.L.F.A. 15-20 HP
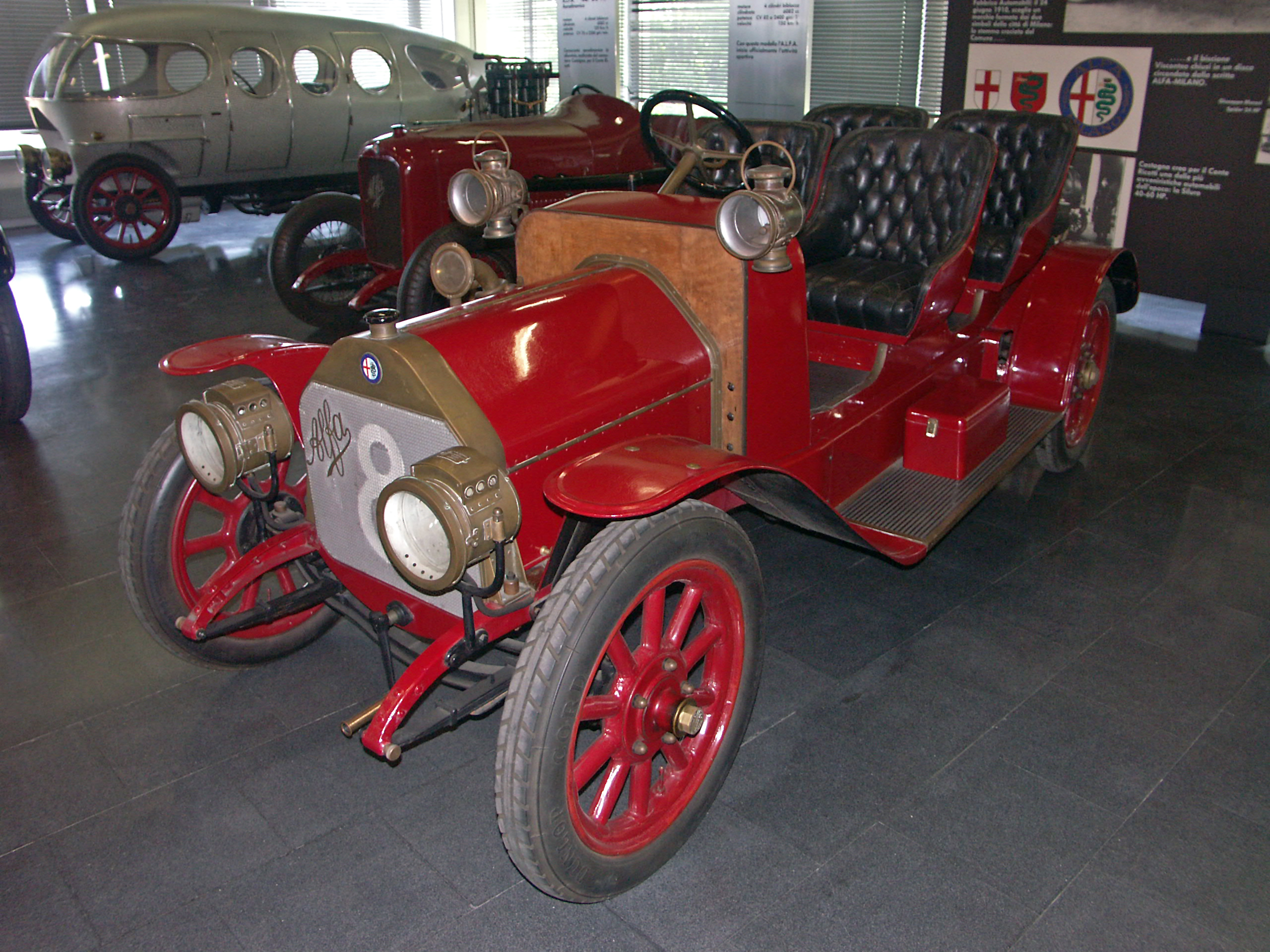

Overview
- Manufacturer: A.L.F.A.
- Production: 1914–1920
- Assembly: Portello, Milan, Italy

Body and chassis
- Layout: Front-engine, rear-wheel drive

Powertrain
- Engine: 2.4 L I4
- Transmission: 3-speed manual

Dimensions
- Wheelbase: 2,920 mm (115.0 in)
- Length: 3,780 mm (148.8 in)
- Width: 1,400 mm (55.1 in)
- Curb weight: 920 kg (2,028 lb)

Chronology
- Predecessor: A.L.F.A 15 HP
- Successor: Alfa Romeo 20/30 HP

The A.L.F.A 15 -20 HP is a car produced by A.L.F.A, manufacturer that later became Alfa Romeo.

== History ==
The model was derived from 15 HP and was fitted with a four-cylinder engine and 2,413 cc of displacement. Compared to its ancestor, the engine capacity was unchanged compared with a rise of power delivered. In fact the engine of 15-20 HP had a compression ratio of 4.3: 1 and developed a maximum power of 28 CV at 2,400 rpm. Bore and stroke were, respectively, 80 mm (3.1 in) and 120 mm (4.7 in). It was front engined rear wheel drive car. It had a gearbox with three gears.

The 15-20 HP was available in two types of body, torpedo and sedan. Compared to that of the ancestor model, the track increased by 50 mm (2.0 in) and reached the 1,350 mm (53.1 in). The model could reach a speed up to 100 km/h (62 mph) and could accelerate from 0 to 100 km/h (62 mph) at 100 seconds.

It was designed by Giuseppe Merosi and it was on sale, at launch, to 9,500 lire. In 1920, after the end of World War I, the price was whipped up to 24,000 liras. The production was in fact interrupted between 1915 and 1919 for the war. It went out of production in 1920. It was not until 1923, when the Alfa launched similar car, the RM.

== Bibliography ==
- Sannia, Alessandro (2010). Alfa Romeo - 100 anni di leggenda. Milano: Gribaudo. ISBN 978-88-7906-972-4.
- Owen, David (1985). Grandi Marche - Alfa Romeo. Milano: Edizioni Acanthus.
