= ALFA 24 HP =

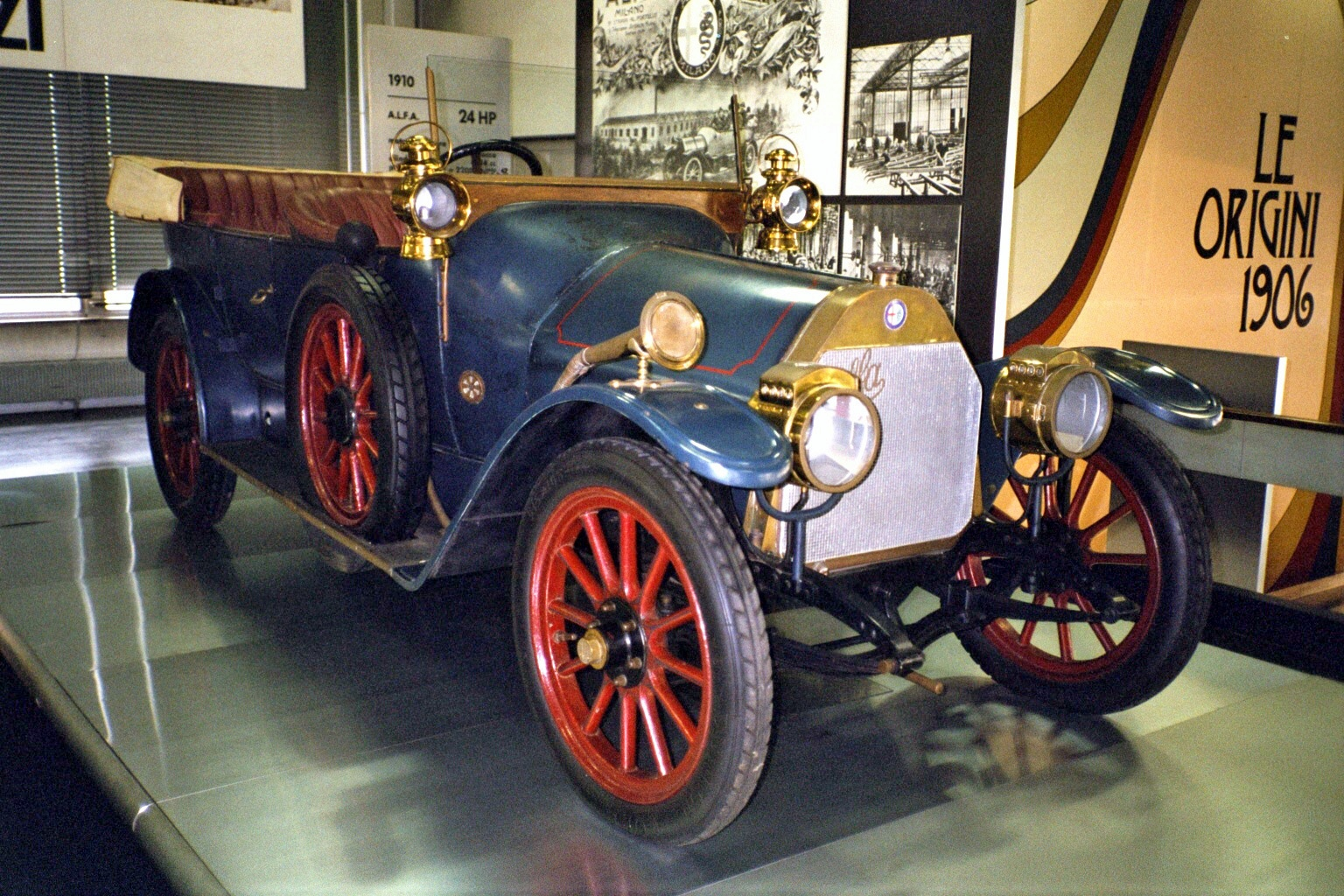
- 1910 ALFA 24 HP Torpedo Castagna in Museo Storico Alfa Romeo

Overview
- Manufacturer: ALFA
- Production: 1910–1914
- Assembly: Italy: Portello, Milan
- Designer: Giuseppe Merosi

Body and chassis
- Body style: Torpedo; Limousine; Baquet (tipo corsa)
- Layout: Front-engine, rear-wheel drive

Powertrain
- Engine: 4.1 L I4
- Transmission: 4-speed manual

Dimensions
- Wheelbase: 3,200 mm (126.0 in)
- Length: 4,250 mm (167.3 in)
- Width: 1,550 mm (61.0 in)
- Height: 1,700 mm (66.9 in)
- Curb weight: 1,000 kg (2,205 lb) (torpedo)

Chronology
- Predecessor: Darracq 14/16 HP
- Successor: 20/30 HP

The ALFA 24 HP is a 4.1-litre four-cylinder passenger car, the first model produced by Italian car manufacturer ALFA (Anonima Lombarda Fabbrica Automobili), which in 1919 would become Alfa Romeo. It was introduced in 1910, the year ALFA was founded, and produced until 1914 in ALFA's Portello factory near Milan. The model's name comes from its tax horsepower rating, then frequently used as vehicle designation.

The 24 HP was commercially successful and continued to be developed for a decade. In 1914 some updates transformed the 24 HP into the ALFA 20-30 HP, produced in 1914 and 1915—with some hundred cars assembled after the war in 1920. In turn the 20-30 HP evolved into the 1921–22 Alfa Romeo 20-30 ES Sport, the first car to be badged Alfa Romeo from its introduction.

In total the 24 HP and 20-30 HP were produced in 680 examples.

== History ==
=== Background and development ===
ALFA was born from Società Italiana Automobili Darracq—Milano (SIAD), an unlucky attempt by French manufacturer Darracq and some Italian investors of creating an Italian branch to locally build and sell Darracq cars under license. In Autumn 1909 SIAD managing director Cavalier Ugo Stella tasked technical director Giuseppe Merosi with developing from a blank sheet a new model, designed from the outset for the Italian market—unlike the unsuccessful small Darracqs. Merosi worked on what would become the 24 HP before ALFA was even established: in January the foreign management of the Portello factory was replaced by Italians, and only in June 1910 SIAD changed its denomination to ALFA. Before the Fall of 1910 the first prototype of the 24 HP was completed and tested. Alongside the 24 HP in 1911 Alfa introduced the 12 HP, somewhat simpler in its construction and equipped with a smaller 2,413 cc engine, later evolved into the 15 HP and then into the 15-20 HP.

=== Racing debut ===
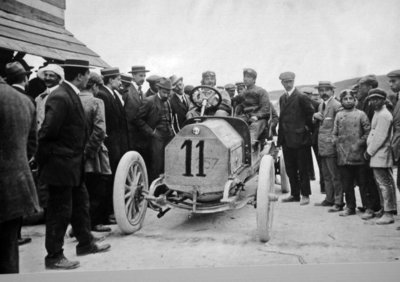
Ronzoni at 1911 Targa Florio

On 14 May 1911 the 24 HP made its racing debut at the 6th Targa Florio. A pair of special 24 HP tipo corsa (racing type) were built for the occasion, with 2-seat baquet bodywork, an additional 30-litre fuel tank behind the seats, two spare tyres, and an engine tuned to 45 bhp (34 kW) at 2,400 rpm. Weighing 870 kg (1,918 lb) (as opposed to 1,000 kg (2,205 lb) for a torpedo-bodied standard 24 HP), the car had a top speed of 110 km/h (68 mph). Both drivers (Nino Franchini and Ugo Ronzoni) had to retire on the third and last lap of the course—the first because of an accident, the second because of physical exhaustion.

=== Production and evolution ===
The 24 HP was sold solely as bare chassis. It was made in five series, named with letters from A to E. The series E introduced in 1914 showed the most significant revisions, so much that the model was renamed ALFA 20-30 HP.

==== 24 HP A, B, C and D ====
- Series A and B, produced in 1910–11 and 1912 respectively, were of 50 cars each. The engine produced 42 bhp (31 kW) at 2,200 rpm, and these cars could reach 100 km/h (62 mph).
- Series C and D, produced in 1913 and 1914 respectively, were roughly of 100 cars each. These adopted the more powerful engine of the 1911 tipo corsa; output was now 45 bhp (34 kW) at 2,400 rpm and top speed 105 km/h (65 mph). The axle tracks were also widened front and rear—1.45 m (57 in) instead of the previous 1.35 m (53 in)

==== ALFA 20-30 HP ====
ALFA 20-30 HP
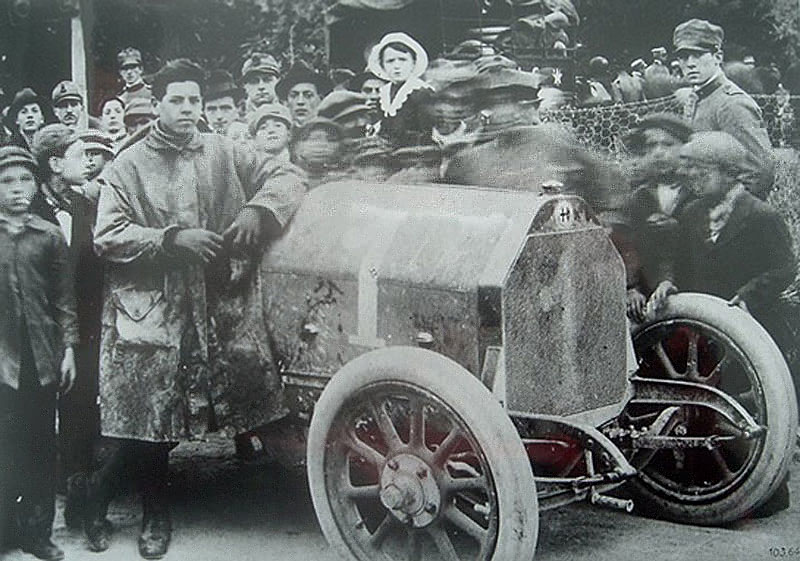
- Giulio Ramponi and an A.L.F.A 24 HP (or 20-30 HP) around 1919/20

Overview
- Manufacturer: ALFA, Alfa Romeo
- Production: 1914–1915, 1920

Chronology
- Predecessor: ALFA 24 HP
- Successor: Alfa Romeo 20-30 ES Sport

The ALFA 20-30 HP of 1914 and 1915, or ALFA 24 HP series E, was an update of the earlier 24 HP. The in-block camshaft was now chain- instead of gear-driven, the engine produced 49 bhp (37 kW) at 2,400 rpm, and top speed was 115 km/h (71 mph).

Although Italy initially remained neutral until 1915, with the outbreak of First World War in 1914 international demand for motor cars declined sharply. As Alfa Romeo turned to wartime production, in 1915 frames and parts for almost 100 20-30 HP cars were set aside unused. They were assembled five years later when the company, which by then had been taken over by Nicola Romeo and renamed Alfa Romeo, restarted automobile production after the war. 95 examples were built in 1920, becoming the first cars badged Alfa Romeo, together with the ALFA 15-20 HP assembled the same year, which had followed a similar fate.

During 1920 the 20-30 HP was developed into the larger displacement, shorter wheelbase Alfa Romeo 20-30 ES Sport, the first car to be badged Alfa Romeo from its introduction. The 20-30 ES was produced in 1921 and 1922 in 124 examples.

==== Production numbers ====
ALFA 24 HP and derivatives, production by year
Year	1910	1911	1912	1913	1914		1915	1916–19	1920	Model total
Series	A		B	C	D	E		World War I	E	Model total
24 HP	10	40	50	103	97	—	—	World War I	—	300
20-30 HP	—	—	—	—	—	100	185	World War I	95	380
Grand total										680

== Specifications ==
The 24 HP and its derivatives were based on a ladder chassis of C-shaped stamped steel rails.

Its engine was a 4,084 cc or 249.2 cu in (bore and stroke 100 x 130 mm, compression ratio 4.15:1) sidevalve inline-four cylinder, fed by a single vertical carburettor. Cylinder block and cylinder head were en bloc, and made of cast iron; the crankcase was cast aluminium, incorporating the four engine mountings. The single in-block camshaft was driven by a gear train on the original 24 HP, and by a more silent chain on its evolution, the 20-30 HP.

The driveline comprised a dry multi-plate clutch, a four-speed gearbox and a one-piece propeller shaft, spinning inside a tube attached to the rear differential housing. At its open end, towards the gearbox, this tube forked out into two ends which, linked to the chassis, located the rear axle. The gearbox was positioned towards the middle of the chassis, almost underneath the driver, rather than in block with the engine—to which it was connected by a short propshaft. Front and rear solid axles were sprung on longitudinal semi-elliptic leaf springs. Brakes were drums on the rear wheels, with both pedal and hand controls. The wheels had wooden spokes.
