= Alfa Romeo Giulia =

Alfa Romeo Giulia (Type 105)
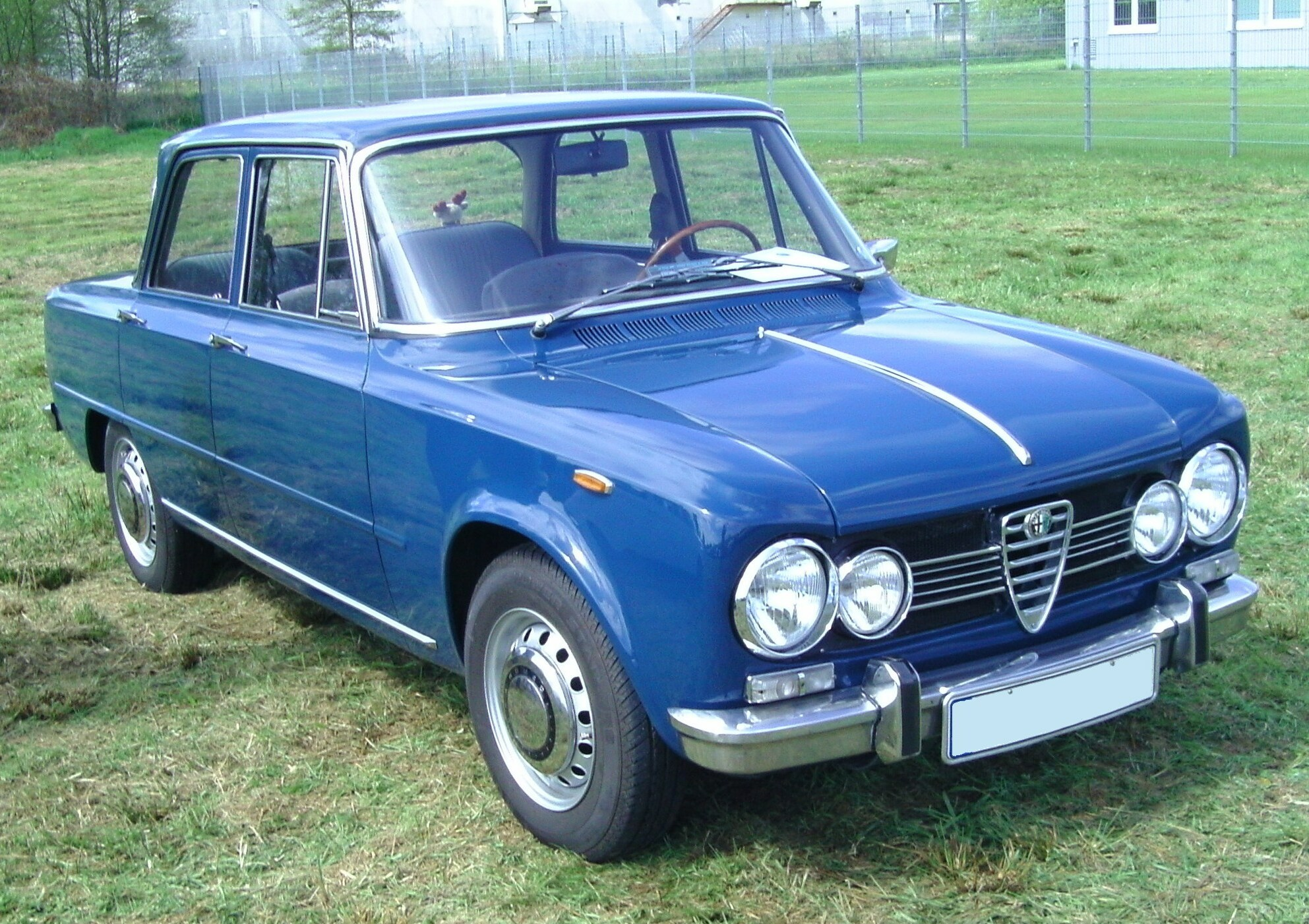
- Alfa Romeo Giulia Super

Overview
- Manufacturer: Alfa Romeo
- Production: 1962–1978
- Assembly: Italy: Portello Plant, Milan (1962–1965); Italy: Arese Plant, Arese (MI) (1965–1978); Portugal: Setúbal (Movauto); South Africa: Rosslyn, Gauteng; Rhodesia: Willowvale, Salisbury (Willowvale Motor Industries)
- Designer: Giuseppe Scarnati

Body and chassis
- Class: Large family car (D)
- Body style: 4-door notchback saloon
- Layout: Front-engine, rear-wheel-drive
- Related: Alfa Romeo 105/115 Series Coupés; Alfa Romeo 1750/2000 Berlina; Alfa Romeo Gran Sport Quattroruote; Alfa Romeo Spider

Powertrain
- Engine: 1.3 L Twin Cam I4 (petrol); 1.6 L Twin Cam I4 (petrol); 1.8 L Perkins 4.108 I4 (diesel)
- Transmission: 4-speed manual (Giulia 1300); 5-speed manual

Dimensions
- Wheelbase: 2,510 mm (98.8 in)
- Length: 4,140 mm (163.0 in)
- Width: 1,560 mm (61.4 in)
- Height: 1,430 mm (56.3 in)
- Kerb weight: 978–1,130 kg (2,156–2,491 lb)

Chronology
- Predecessor: Alfa Romeo Giulietta (750/101)
- Successor: Alfa Romeo Giulietta (116)

Alfa Romeo Giulia (Italian pronunciation: [ˈdʒuːlja]) is the name of three not directly related model (line)s from Italian carmaker Alfa Romeo. The first were the four-door Type 105 entry-level compact executive sports sedans produced from 1962 to 1978; the second are the updated (mainly up-engined) Spider, Sprint, and Sprint Speciale Alfa Giuliettas, and in 2015, Alfa Romeo revived the Giulia name, again for a compact executive car (type 952).

Alfa Romeo was one of the first mainstream manufacturers to put a powerful engine in a light-weight 1 tonne (2,205 lb) four-door car for mass production. The Type 105 Giulia was equipped with a light alloy twin overhead camshaft four-cylinder engine similar to that of the earlier Giulietta (750/101) range, available in 1.3-litre (1,290 cc) and 1.6-litre (1,570 cc) versions. Various configurations of carburetors and tuning produced power outputs from about 80 to about 110 bhp (55 to 75 kW), coupled in most cases to 5-speed manual transmission.

Giulia sedans were noted for lively handling and impressive acceleration among small European four-door sedans of their era, especially considering modest engine sizes offered. The popular Super version with the twin carburettor 1.6 litre engine had a top speed of 170 km/h (106 mph) and accelerated from 0 to 100 km/h (62 mph) in about 12 seconds, better than many sports cars of the late 1960s and early 1970s.

The styling of the three-box four-door sedan was square and boxy, softened only by detailing of the front and bonnet, roofline, and boot. Using a wind tunnel during development helped designers to find a remarkably aerodynamic shape with a drag coefficient of Cd=0.34, particularly low for a saloon of the era.

The Giulia Spider was succeeded by the Alfa Romeo Spider (105/115) in 1966.

== Models ==
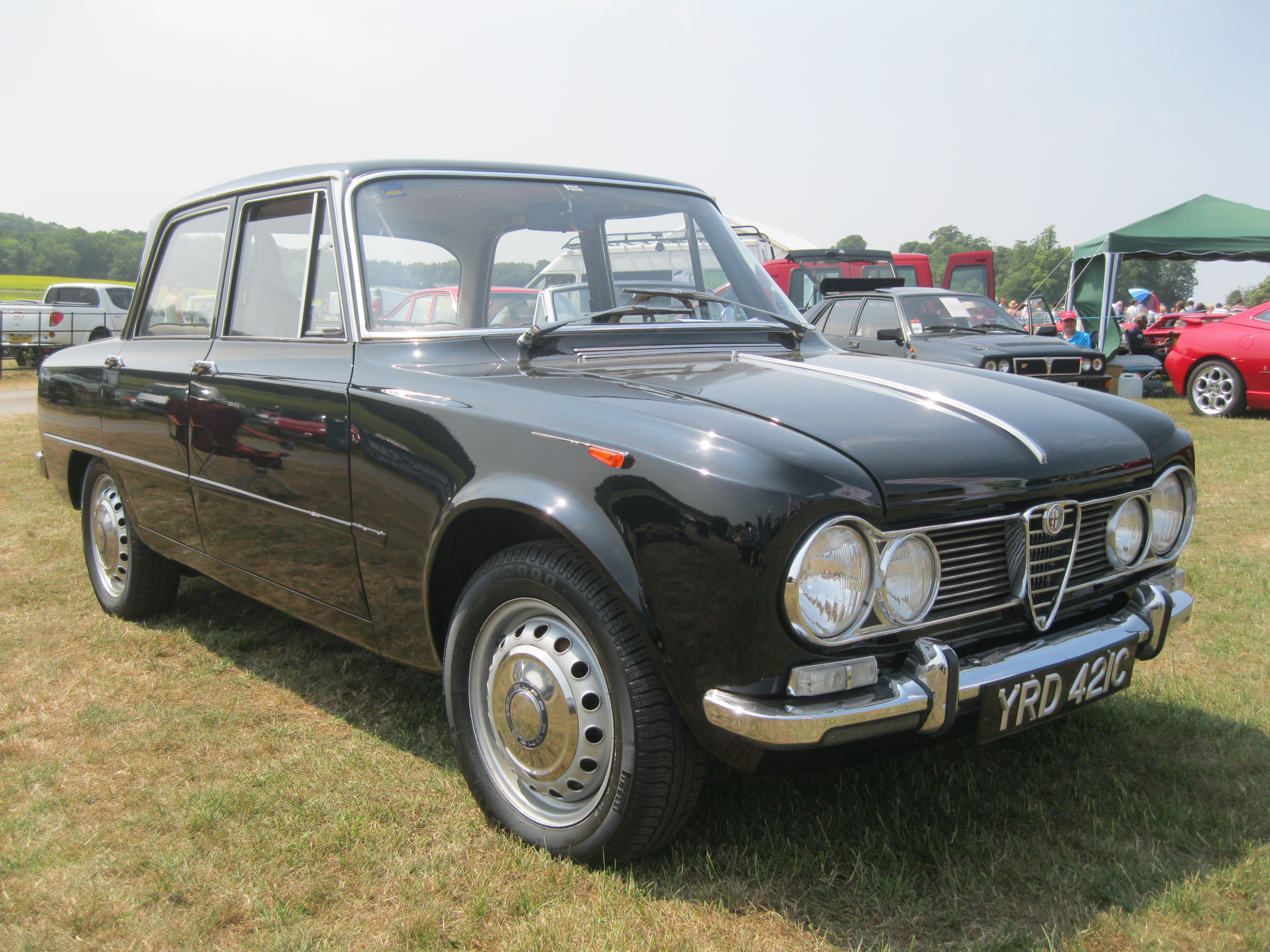

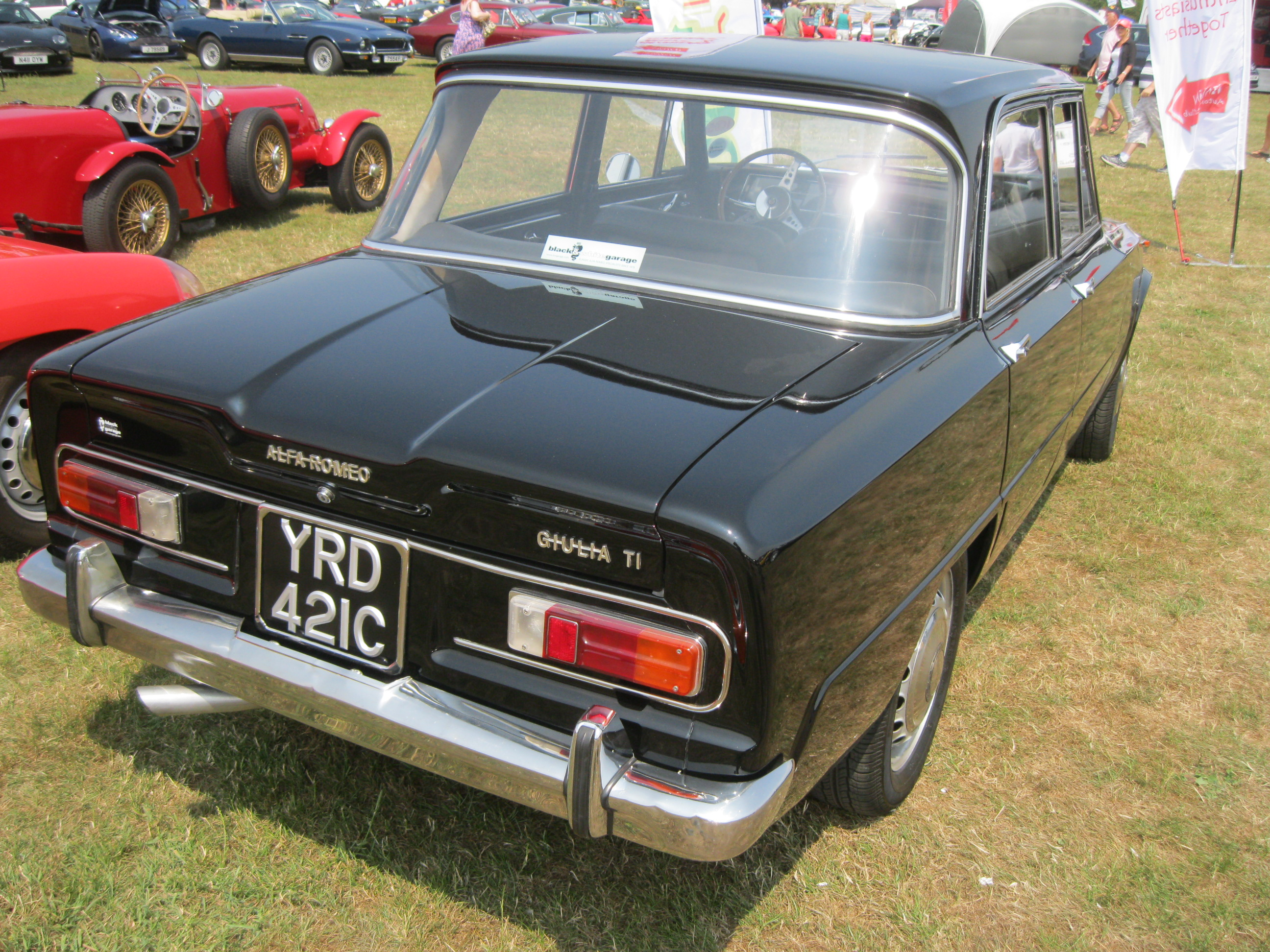
1965 Giulia TI; the C-shaped chrome trim around the tail lights is typical of the earliest Giulias.

Note: chassis and engine type numbers displayed in italic for each model are sourced from Fusi 1978, pages 841–848.

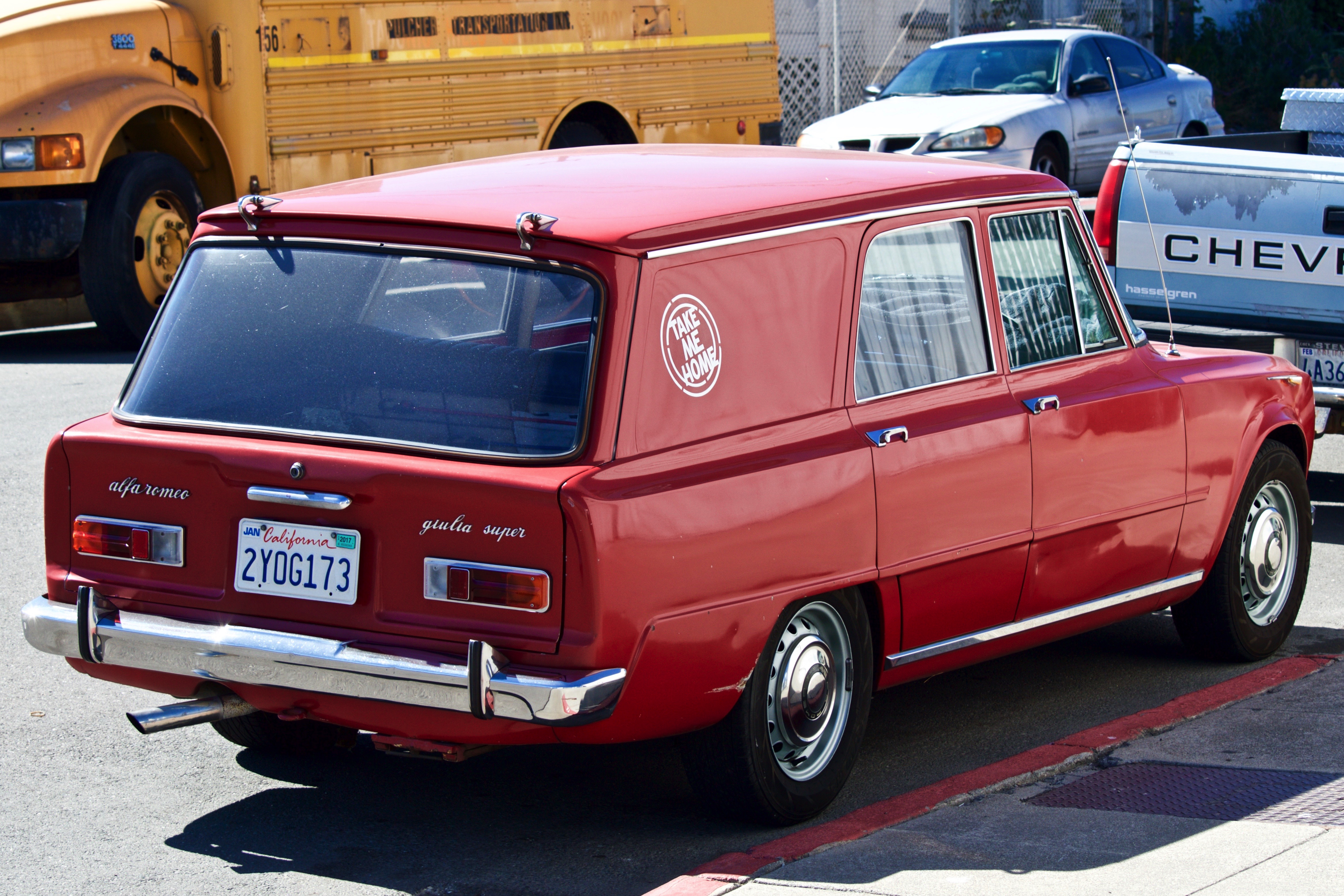
Alfa Romeo Giulia Super Promiscua (station wagon conversion by Carrozzeria Colli).

=== Giulia TI ===
Tipo: 105.14 (LHD, column shifter), 105.08 (LHD, floor shifter), 105.09 (RHD, floor shifter). Engine: 00514.

Unveiled on 27 June 1962 at the Autodromo Nazionale Monza, the Alfa Romeo Giulia TI was the very first of the Giulia family of cars to be introduced. Its 1,570 cc Alfa Romeo Twin Cam engine was fitted with a single Solex 33 PAIA 7 twin-choke down-draft carburettor, and produced 92 DIN-rated PS (68 kW; 91 hp) or 106 SAE-rated PS at 6,200 rpm. The "TI" nomenclature referred to a class of Italian saloon car racing known as "Turismo Internazionale", and had previously been applied to higher-performance versions of the 1900 and Giulietta saloons in the 1950s. However, for the Giulia saloon, the TI was at first the only version available, and later, with the introduction of the TI Super and Super, the TI became the base version in the 1.6-litre engine class. A distinguishing feature of the original Giulia were drum brakes on all corners, the front ones of the three-shoe type like on late Giuliettas; four-wheel Dunlop disc brakes and a brake servo were phased in during August 1963, after 22–23 thousand cars had been built. The car was marketed as a six-seater, thanks to a standard column-mounted shifter and a split bench front seat—though Italian car magazine Quattroruote found it rather a comfortable four-seater. Other notable interior features of the early models were mottled cloth and vinyl upholstery, a grey, trapezoid instrument panel including a strip speedometer, and a black steering wheel with two ivory-coloured spokes and a chrome half horn ring.

In May 1964 a floor shifter became available (chassis tipo 105.08), to be ordered solely in conjunction with the newly introduced separate front seats. Around the same time a right hand drive model variant entered production (tipo 105.09), with floor shifter only. In February 1966 several changes were made. The floor shifter became standard; the interior received new seats, a new dashboard with triple round instruments (two large ones and the smaller fuel gauge in the centre) in place of the strip speedometer, and new door cards. From outside these later TIs can be recognized by L-shaped chrome strips around the tail lights which supplanted the previous C-shaped ones. Production of the Giulia TI ceased during 1967; it was replaced by the Giulia 1600 S as the entry-level 1.6-litre model.

=== Giulia TI Super ===
Tipo: 105.16. Engine: 00516.

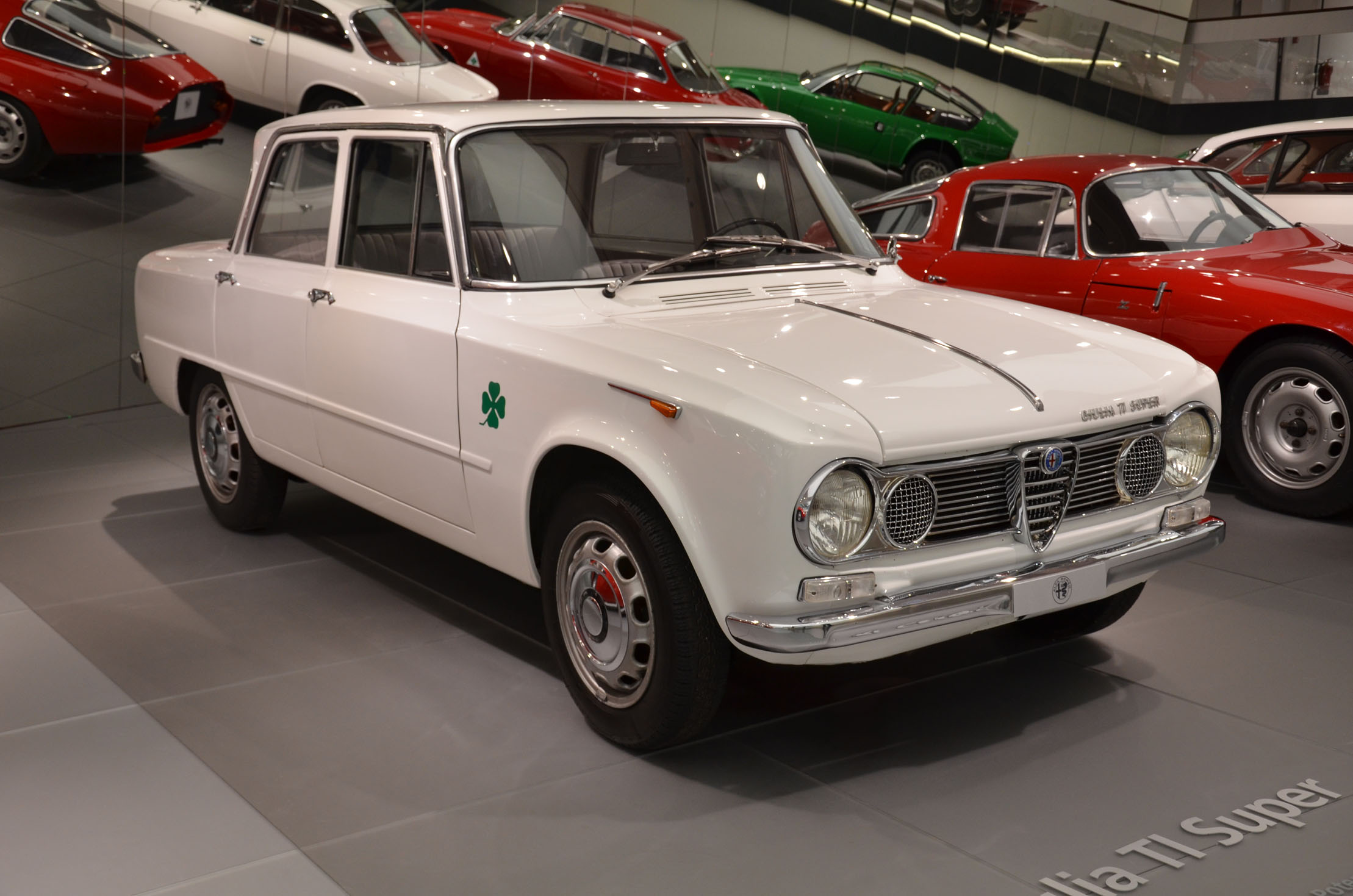
An Alfa Romeo Giulia TI Super, on display in the Alfa Romeo Museum

The Alfa Romeo Giulia TI Super was a special road-going sports model produced in limited numbers, fitted with a more powerful engine and a number of weight saving components, and intended for racing use. It was introduced to the press at the Monza race track on 24 April 1963. In total only 501 were made, 178 in 1963 and 323 1964. On 2 May 1964 the TI Super received international FIA and Italian CSAI homologation for racing, and was then extensively campaigned in the European Touring Car Challenge. Today the Giulia TI Super is rare and considered very desirable by collectors.

The TI Super's 1,570 cc engine was the same installed on the Giulia Sprint Speciale coupé—though bearing a different type code. It was fitted with two twin-choke horizontal Weber 45 DCOE 14 carburettors and, as on the Sprint Speciale, produced 112 DIN-rated PS (82 kW; 110 hp) or 129 SAE-rated PS at 6,500 rpm, pushing top speed to over 185 km/h (115 mph). Dry weight was 910 kilograms (2,006 lb) compared to 1,000 kg (2,205 lb) of the standard Giulia TI. Parts contributing to the weight reduction were mesh grilles replacing the inner pair of head lamps, bumpers without overriders, fixed front quarter windows, Plexiglas rear windows, and magnesium alloy wheels with hubcaps, very similar in appearance to the standard steel wheels of the TI. Braking was by discs all around, although the first cars used drums. Cars built from August 1964 used the bodyshell of the TI with mounting points for the brake servo, but were never fitted with one. On the inside both the gear shifter and the handbrake lever were moved to the floor. The TI's instrument cluster with its strip speedometer was replaced by a three-instrument binnacle comprising speedometer, tachometer and a multi-gauge instrument (fuel level, water temperature, oil temperature and oil pressure). The steering wheel was a three-spoke aluminium lightweight item with centre horn button. Front racing-type bucket seats and safety belts were standard, while the heater, door armrests, the grab handle in front of the passenger, the glove box lid, and ashtrays were deleted. Visually the Giulia TI Super was made immediately recognizable by green quadrifoglios (four-leaf clovers) on the front wings and tail panel, and "Giulia TI Super" scripts on the engine bonnet and tail. All cars produced were painted white, save for two examples—one red and one grey.

Contrary to popular belief, the Giulias used by the Italian police forces (the Pantere of the Polizia di Stato and Gazzelle of the Carabinieri) were not tuned TI Supers but rather standard models; early ones were fitted with mesh in place of the inner headlights like the TI Super simply to make the siren mounted behind sound louder. Only two TI Supers were actually owned by the Polizia, and used at the police schools of Nettuno and Cesena.

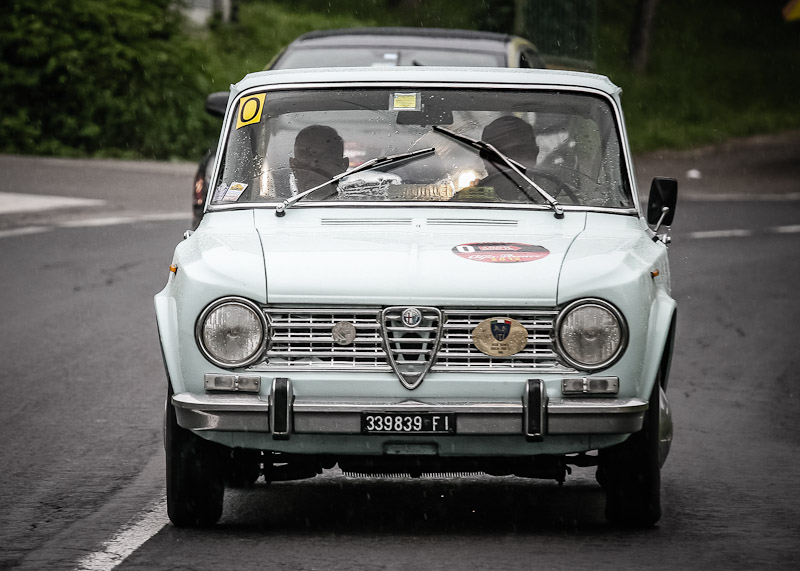
The single-headlamp front end of early 1.3-litre Giulias, here a 1300 ti.

=== Giulia 1300 ===
Tipo: 105.06. Engine: 00506.

The Giulia 1300 marked the Giulia's entry in the then crowded 1.3-litre class, and featured simplified trim and equipment. It was introduced on 11 May 1964 at the Autodromo Nazionale Monza and produced until 1971, in left hand drive only. At first the Giulia 1300 was sold alongside the slightly cheaper Giulietta TI, the last of the outgoing 101-series Giulietta saloons, in its last year of production. In fact the Giulia used a twin cam engine derived from the Giulietta TI's. Equipped with a single Solex 32 PAIA 7 down-draft twin-choke carburettor, this updated 1,290 cc four-cylinder produced 78 DIN-rated PS (57 kW; 77 hp) or 89 SAE-rated PS at 6,000 rpm. Top speed was 155 km/h (96 mph). A four-speed gearbox with floor change fitted as standard; the 1300 would remain the only Giulia model not fitted with a five-speed gearbox. Braking was by discs all around, without a servo at first, later with a servo.

Visually the 1300 was distinguished by a new grille design housing single instead of twin head lamps, rectangular side repeaters without ornamentation, and all-metal hubcaps. It also did without bumper over-riders, most pieces of exterior chrome trim, and rear back-up lamps. Inside dashboard and steering wheel came from the TI (though the latter was all-black), there were rubber mats instead of carpets, and several convenience features such as the passenger grab handle and rear ashtrays were omitted. In September 1967 the Giulia 1300 was updated, adopting a black mesh grille with three horizontal chrome bars, the vertical louvres at the base of the windshield first seen on the Giulia Super, the second series Giulia TI three round instrument dashboard, and the 1300 ti's three-spoke steering wheel.

=== Giulia Super ===
Tipo 105.26 was introduced at the 1965 Geneva Motor Show. It transferred the technology from the racing TI Super to a road car, to make the most successful Giulia saloon. 1,570 cc engine with two double-choke Weber 40DCOE carburettors for a milder, but torquier tune than the TI Super - 98 PS (72 kW; 97 hp) at 5500 rpm. New dashboard with two large round instruments (speedo and tacho) and clock. Sportier steering wheel with three aluminium spokes and centre horn push, similar to that of the Ti Super, later changed for one with the horn pushes in the spokes. All-around disc brakes with servo were fitted as standard from the outset. The serpent crest of the Sforza family appears in a badge on the C-pillar and is a distinguishing feature of the Super saloon. For 1968, there was a suspension update, including revised geometry and a rear anti-roll bar. The wheels were changed in size from 5J x 15 to 5J x 14, and tires from 155/15 Pirelli Cinturato to 165/14 Pirelli Cinturato. For 1970, updates included dual-circuit brakes, centre-mounted handbrake lever to replace under-dash "umbrella handle", larger external door handles, and top-hinged pedals (the latter in left hand drive models only; right hand drive continued with bottom-hinged pedals to the end of production). In 1972, Tipo 105.26 was rationalised into the Giulia 1.3 - Giulia 1.6 range (see below).

Version	Years of production
Giulia 1600 TI	1962–1967
Giulia 1600 TI Super	1963–1964
Giulia 1300	1964–1971
Giulia Super	1965–1972
Giulia 1300 ti	1966–1972
Giulia 1300 Super	1970–1972
Giulia 1600 S	1968–1970
Giulia Super 1.3	1972–1974
Giulia Super 1.6	1972–1974
Giulia Nuova Super 1.3	1974–1977
Giulia Nuova Super 1.6	1974–1977
Giulia Nuova Super Diesel	1976–1977

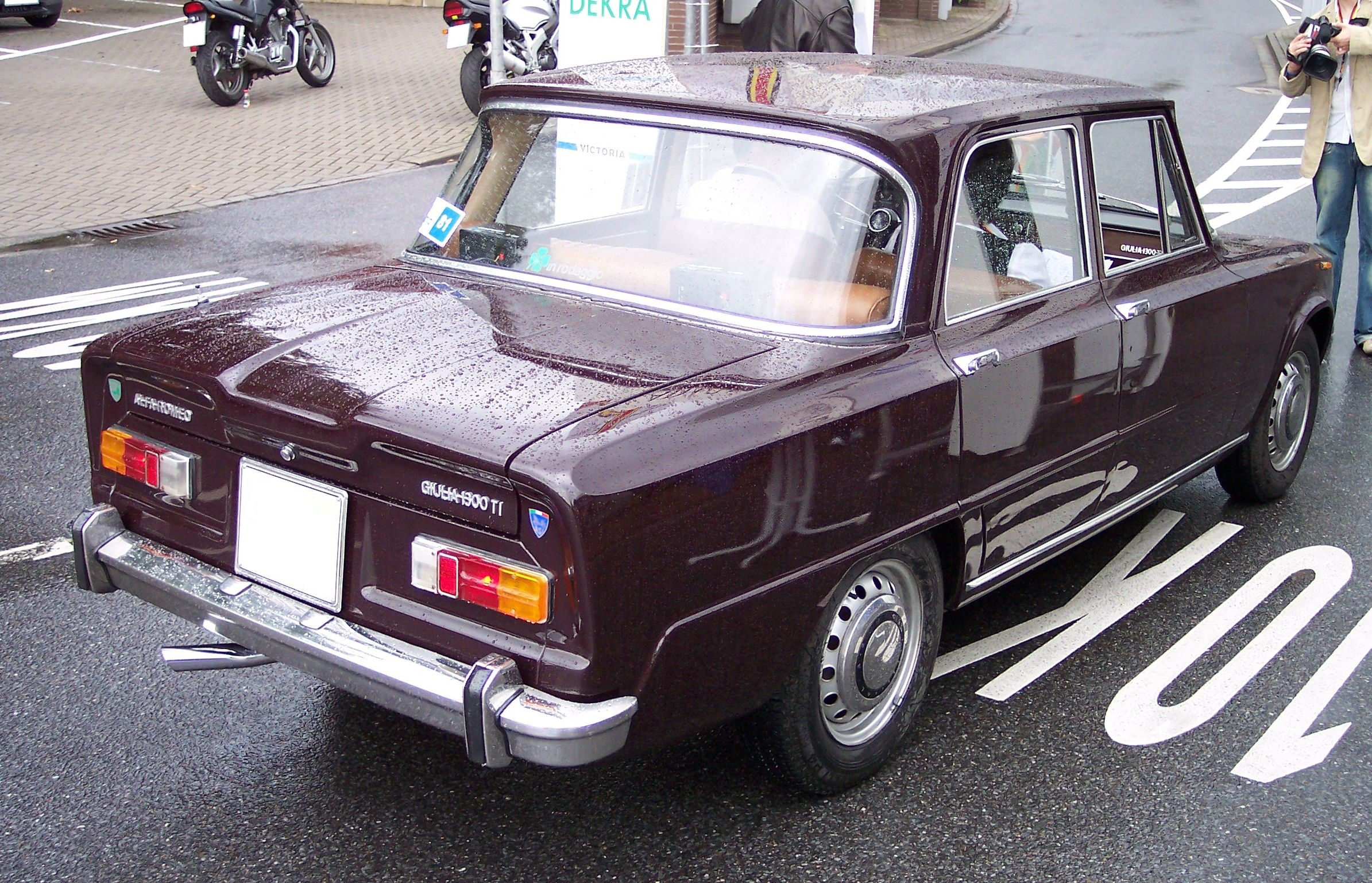
Giulia 1300 TI (1970–1972 model)

=== Giulia 1300 ti ===
Tipo 105.39 was built from 1965 to 1972. Right hand drive model replaced in 1970 by the 1300 Super (see below). It mounted a 1,290 cc engine with single down-draft carburettor for 82 PS (60 kW; 81 hp) at 6000 rpm. Unlike the re-deployed 101-series Giulietta engine of the austerity-model 1300, the 1300 ti motor was a 105 series engine, basically that of the sportier GT1300 Junior coupe with different camshaft timing (but the same camshafts) and induction system. Other features were the five-speed gearbox, a three-spoke bakelite steering wheel with plastic horn push covering the centre and spokes, and the dashboard initially with strip speedo like that of the TI. For 1968, updates included a dashboard based on that of the Super, but with a simpler instrument binnacle, still featuring two large round instruments (speedo and tacho) and a separate fuel gauge, and the same suspension, wheel and tire updates applied to the Giulia Super in the same year. 1970 updates included dual-circuit brakes, centre handbrake, larger external doorhandles and top-hinged pedals (on left hand drive cars only), again as applied to the Super for that year.

=== Giulia 1600 S ===
Tipo 105.85 was basically a Giulia TI re-introduced in 1968 as a lower-level model to come between the 1300 and 1300 ti on one hand, and the Super on the other. It had a re-interpretation of the 1,570 cc single-carburettor engine for 95 PS (70 kW; 94 hp) at 5500 rpm and similar trim to the 1300 ti. Replaced in 1970 by the 1300 Super (see below) which offered similar performance in a lower tax bracket. The last cars from 1970 featured the top-hinged pedals, centre handbrake and dual-circuit brakes as for the Super and 1300 ti.

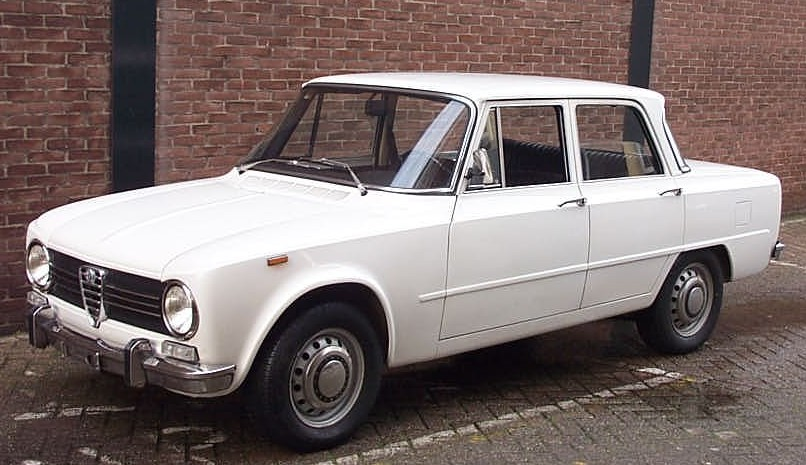
Giulia Super 1300 (1971)

=== Giulia 1300 Super ===
Tipo 115.09 was introduced in 1970. It was basically a 1300 ti fitted with the engine from the GT 1300 Junior coupe that featured two double-choke horizontal carburettors; the engine actually had the GT 1300 Junior type number. This model was rationalised into the Giulia Super 1.3 - Giulia Super 1.6 range in 1972.

=== Giulia Super 1.3 and Giulia Super 1.6 ===
In 1972 a rationalisation of the Giulia range saw the Super 1300 (Tipo 115.09) and the Super (Tipo 105.26) re-released as the Super 1.3 and Super 1.6. The two models featured the same equipment, interior and exterior trim, differing only in engine size (1,290 cc and 1,570 cc) and final drive ratio. The 1300 ti was dropped. A small Alfa Romeo badge on the C-pillar is a distinguishing feature, as are hubcaps with exposed wheel nuts.

=== 1600 Rallye ===
In December 1972, Alfa-Romeo South Africa released the 1600 Rallye. This locally developed more powerful 1600 cc version of the 1300 Super, using the 1300s single-headlight body shell. The car was largely ready for competition and was only planned to be built in limited numbers, and was fitted with racing-style rear-view mirrors, rally lamps, fully adjustable seats, and a limited-slip differential. Claimed power was 125 hp (93 kW; 127 PS) SAE.

=== Giulia Nuova Super ===
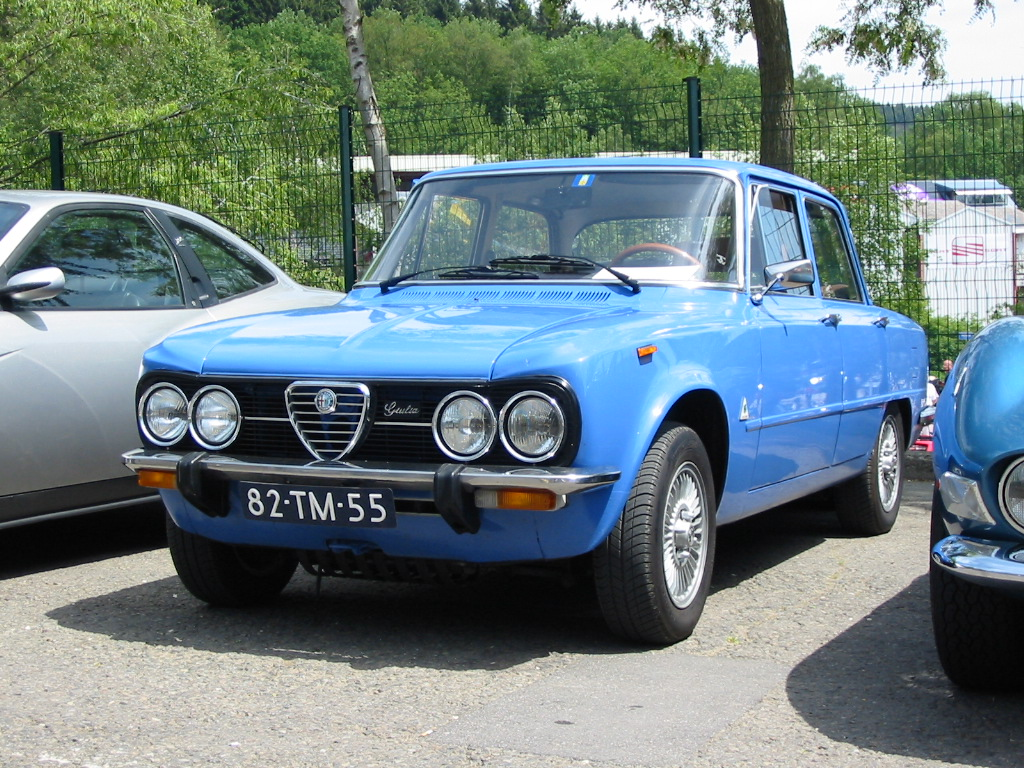
Giulia Nuova Super (1974)

The Giulia Super range was re-released in 1974 as the Nuova Super range, including the Giulia Nuova Super 1300 and 1600 This and featured a new black plastic front grille and a flat boot (trunk) lid without the characteristic centre spine. Otherwise the cars differed little from their Giulia Super predecessors and bore the same Tipo numbers with an S suffix. Production ceased in 1977.

==== Giulia Nuova Super Diesel ====
Tipo: 115.40. Engine: 108U.

Introduced in June 1976, the Giulia Nuova Super Diesel became the first ever diesel engined Alfa Romeo passenger car. It was fitted with a naturally aspirated Perkins type 4.108 1,760 cc four cylinder, the same engine used on the Alfa Romeo F12 van. With an output of 55 SAE-rated PS (40 kW; 54 hp) at 4,000 rpm and a 138 km/h (86 mph) top speed, the diesel version was the slowest of all Giulias. In total 6,537 examples were made up to 1977. The diesels were not quite in line with Alfa Romeo's sporting image, but Alfa's president stated that Italy's fiscal legislation so favoured diesels that the company was simply forced to offer such an option.

== Engines and performance ==
Unless noted otherwise, DIN rated horsepower and torque is given.

Alfa Romeo Giulia, engines and performance
Model	Years	Engine	Compr. ratio	Fuel system	Power	Torque	Top speed
Giulia 1300	1964–71	1,290 cc Twin Cam	8.5:1	1x twin carb.	78 PS (57 kW; 77 hp) at 6,000 rpm	102 N⋅m (75 lb⋅ft) at 4,700 rpm	155 km/h (96 mph)
Giulia 1300 ti	1966–72	1,290 cc Twin Cam	9.0:1	1x twin carb.	82 PS (60 kW; 81 hp) at 6,000 rpm	104 N⋅m (77 lb⋅ft) at 4,900 rpm	160 km/h (99 mph)
Giulia 1300 Super	1970–72	1,290 cc Twin Cam	9.0:1	2x twin carbs.	89 PS (65 kW; 88 hp) at 6,000 rpm	140 N⋅m* (103 lb⋅ft) at 3,200 rpm	165 km/h (103 mph)
Giulia Super 1.3	1972–74	1,290 cc Twin Cam	9.0:1	2x twin carbs.	89 PS (65 kW; 88 hp) at 6,000 rpm	140 N⋅m* (103 lb⋅ft) at 3,200 rpm	165 km/h (103 mph)
Giulia Nuova Super 1300	1974–77	1,290 cc Twin Cam	9.0:1	2x twin carbs.	89 PS (65 kW; 88 hp) at 6,000 rpm	140 N⋅m* (103 lb⋅ft) at 3,200 rpm	165 km/h (103 mph)
Giulia TI	1962–67	1,570 cc Twin Cam	9.0:1	1x twin carb.	92 PS (68 kW; 91 hp) at 6,200 rpm	130 N⋅m (96 lb⋅ft) at 4,000 rpm	165 km/h (103 mph)
Giulia TI Super	1963–64	1,570 cc Twin Cam	9.7:1	2x twin carbs.	112 PS (82 kW; 110 hp) at 6,500 rpm	n/a	185 km/h (115 mph)
Giulia 1600 S	1969–70	1,570 cc Twin Cam	9.0:1	1x twin carb.	95 PS (70 kW; 94 hp) at 5,500 rpm	n/a	170 km/h (106 mph)
Giulia Super	1965–69	1,570 cc Twin Cam	9.0:1	2x twin carbs.	98 PS (72 kW; 97 hp) at 5,500 rpm	136 N⋅m (100 lb⋅ft) at 3,000 rpm	175 km/h (109 mph)
Giulia Super	1969–72	1,570 cc Twin Cam	9.0:1	2x twin carbs.	102 PS (75 kW; 101 hp) at 5,500 rpm	162 N⋅m* (119 lb⋅ft) at 2,900 rpm	175 km/h (109 mph)
Giulia Super 1.6	1972–74	1,570 cc Twin Cam	9.0:1	2x twin carbs.	102 PS (75 kW; 101 hp) at 5,500 rpm	162 N⋅m* (119 lb⋅ft) at 2,900 rpm	175 km/h (109 mph)
Giulia Nuova Super 1600	1974–77	1,570 cc Twin Cam	9.0:1	2x twin carbs.	102 PS (75 kW; 101 hp) at 5,500 rpm	162 N⋅m* (119 lb⋅ft) at 2,900 rpm	175 km/h (109 mph)
Giulia Nuova Super Diesel	1976–77	1,760 cc Perkins 4.108 diesel	22:1	Injection pump	55 PS* (40 kW; 54 hp) at 4,000 rpm	101 N·m* (74 lb⋅ft) at 2,200 rpm	138 km/h (86 mph)

Notes

- * SAE rated

== Giulia Spider, Sprint and Sprint Speciale ==
The Spider, Sprint and Sprint Speciale Giulias introduced together with the Giulia sedan in 1962 were rebadged and updated versions of earlier Giulietta models (series 101), now with a 92 CV (68 kW; 91 hp) 1.6 litre instead of a 1.3 litre engine. Easiest to distinguish from a Giulietta is the Spider (tipo 101.23), which featured a bonnet bulge to clear the slightly taller engine. The Giulia Sprint 1600 (tipo 101.12) arrived in June 1962. The Sprint coupé was also available for a short time with the 1.3 litre engine as the Sprint 1300 - essentially a Giulietta Sprint with a different name. This version carries a small "1300" script on the lower bootlid, while Giulia 1600 Sprints have a "1600" badge just behind the rear wheel. Most models were discontinued in 1964, although the Sprint Speciale continued until 1966. The Spider was complemented by a Spider Veloce in 1964 (tipo 101.18), using the engine seen in the Giulia Sprint Speciale and Giulia TI Super, producing 112 CV (82 kW; 110 hp). The Giulia Spider continued to be available until the mid-1966 introduction of the Spider 1600 Duetto.

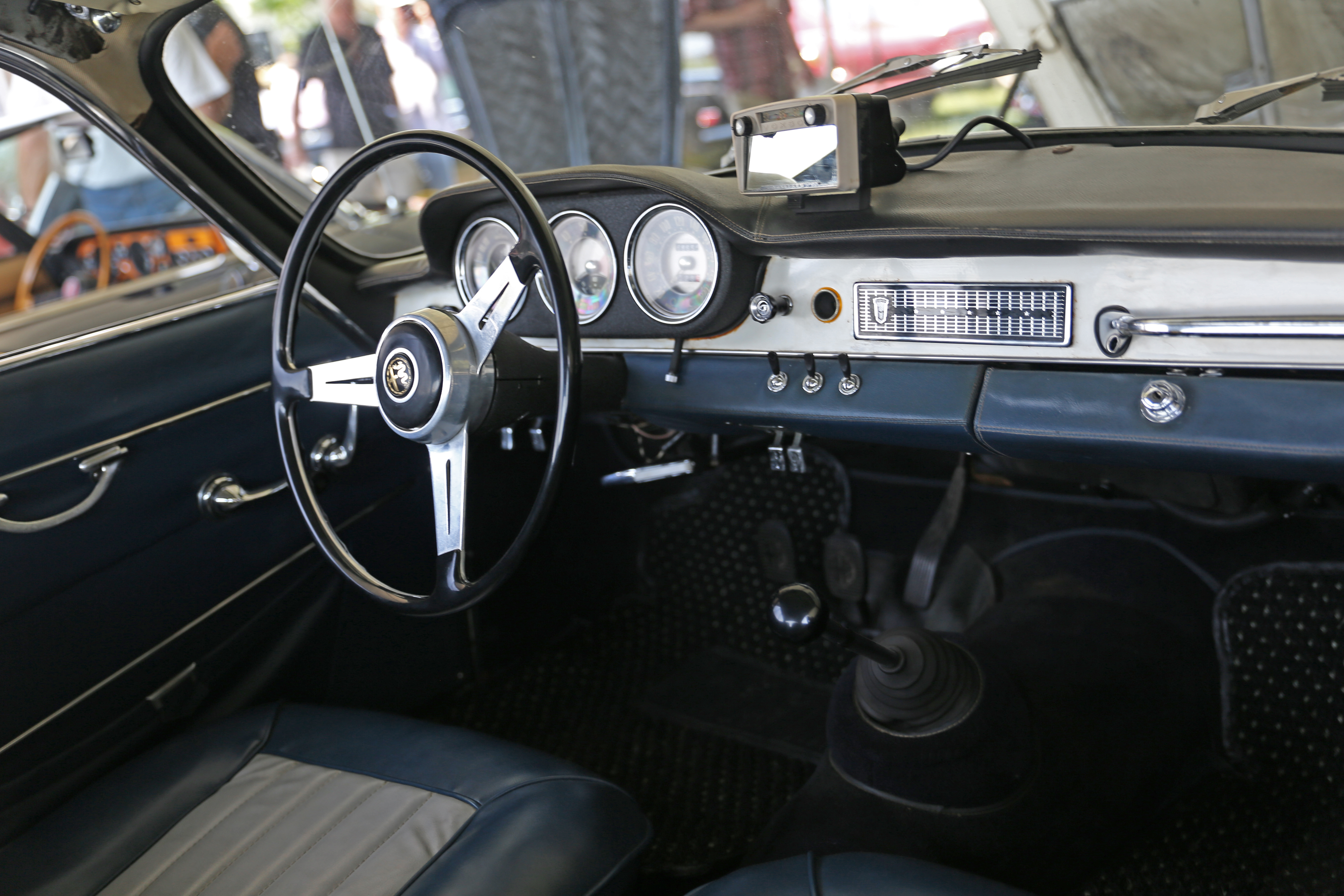
The new dashboard and steering wheel of the Giulia Sprint 1600

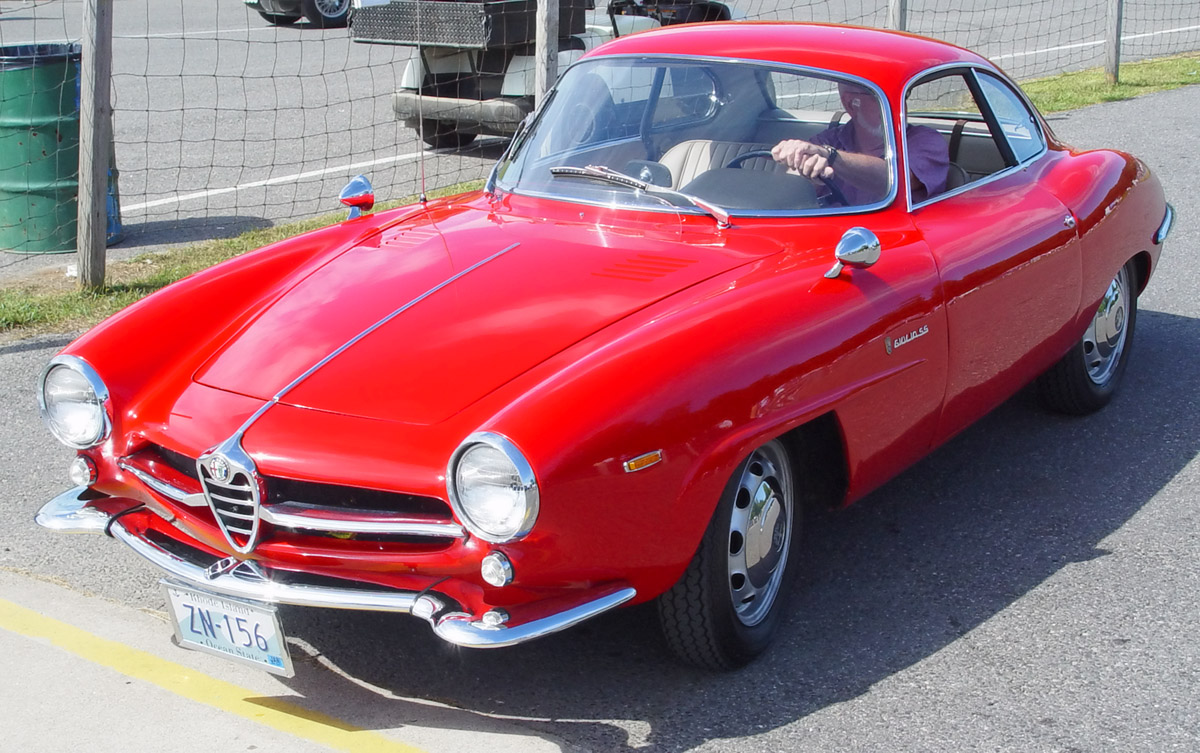
Giulia Sprint Speciale

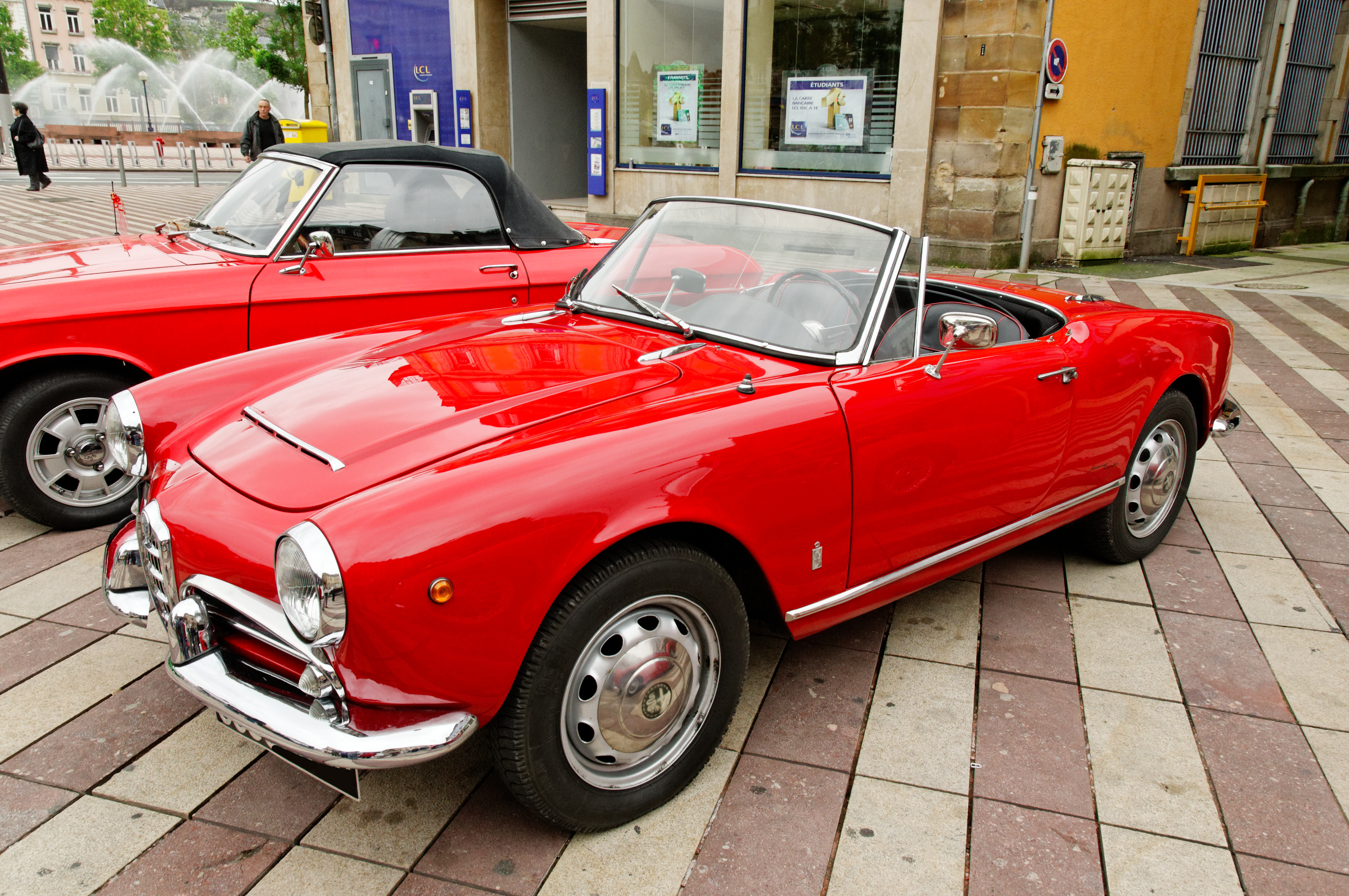
Giulia Spider

== Giulia Sprint GT ==
In 1963 the Alfa Romeo Giulia Sprint GT (tipo 105) was first shown. This coupé (and rare convertible sister, the Giulia GTC) proceeded to be developed through numerous series with engines from 1.3 up to 2 liters. Production ended in 1976. There was also a range of competition models called the GTA as well as a Zagato-bodied iteration called the Junior Z.

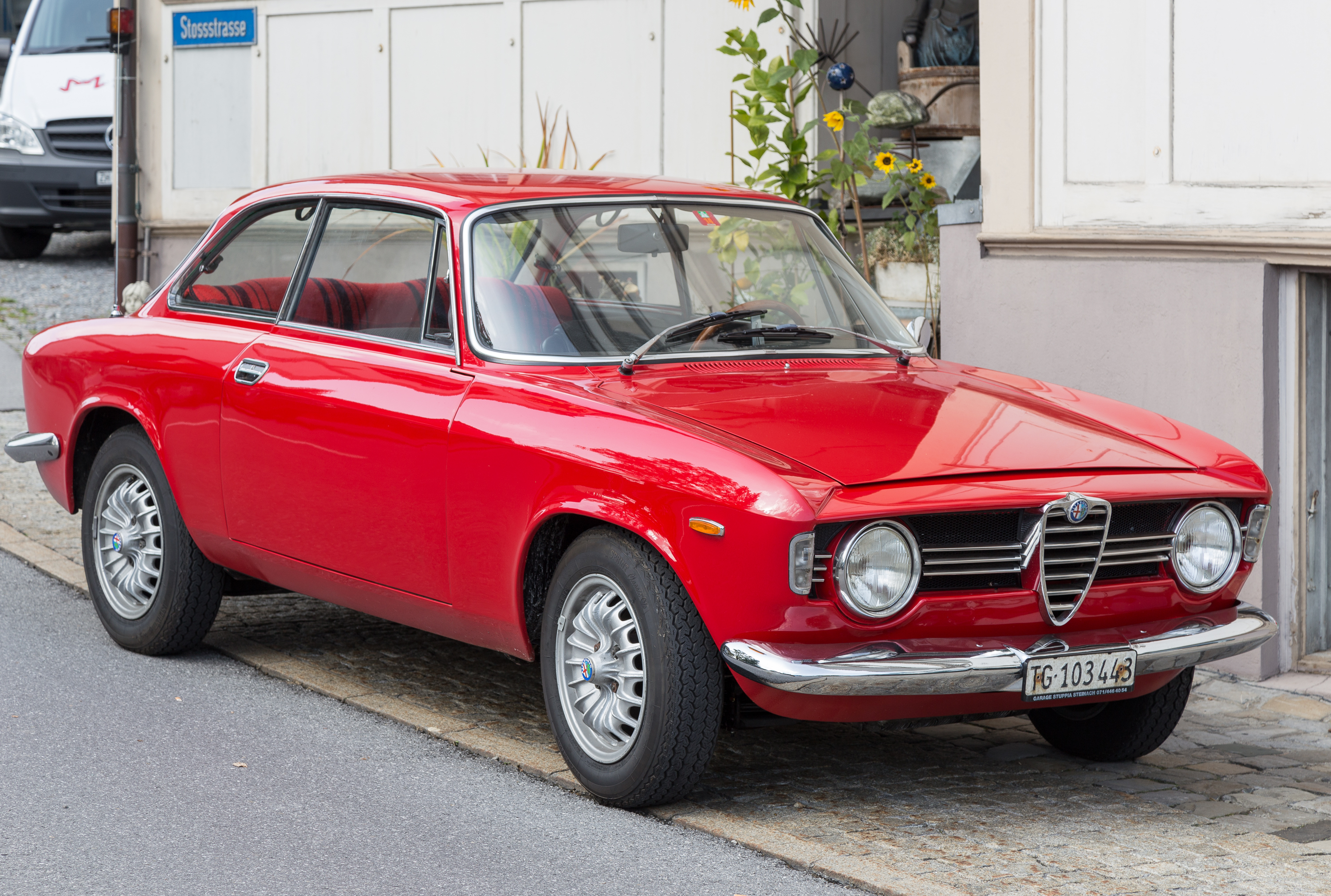
Giulia Sprint GT

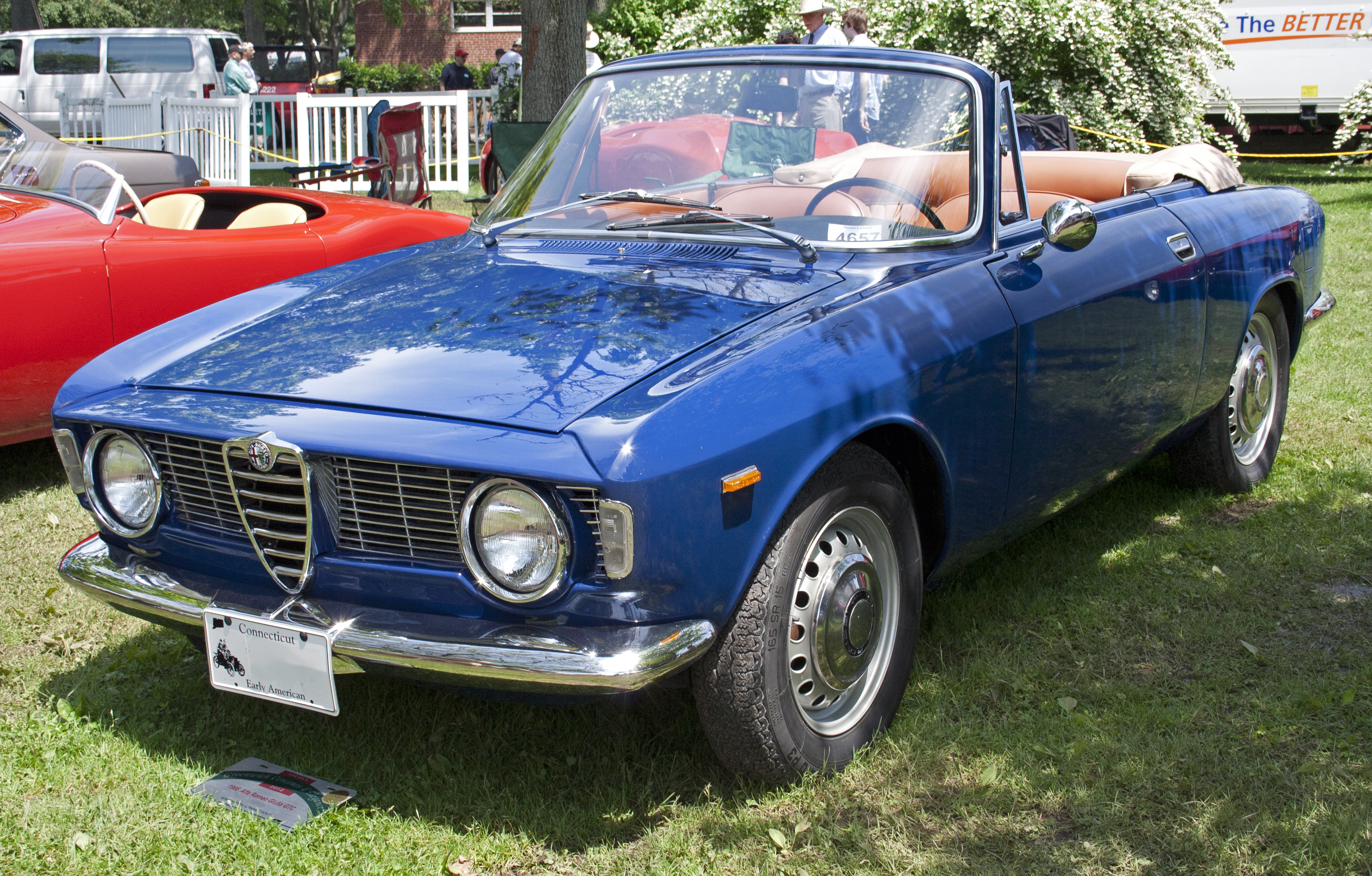
Giulia GTC Spider

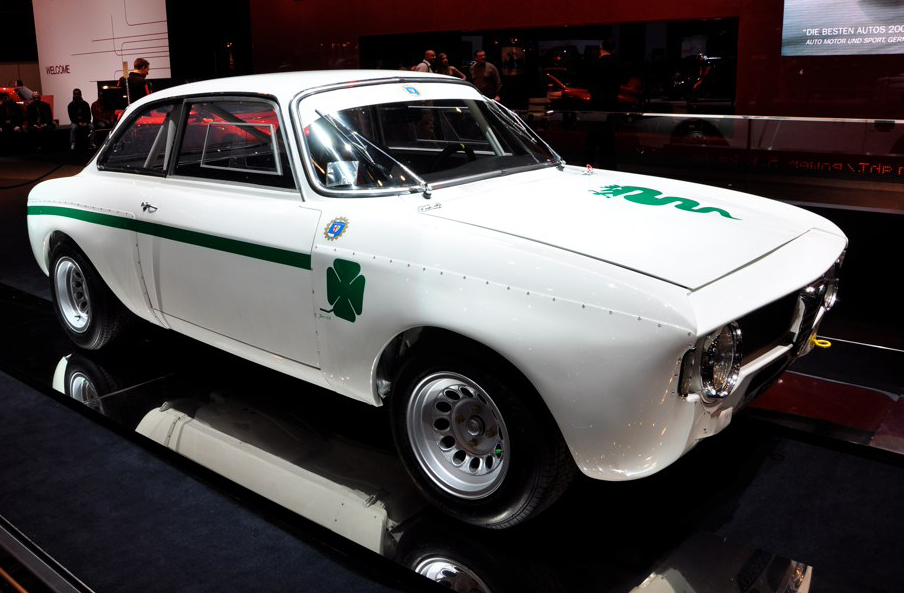
GTA 1300 Junior

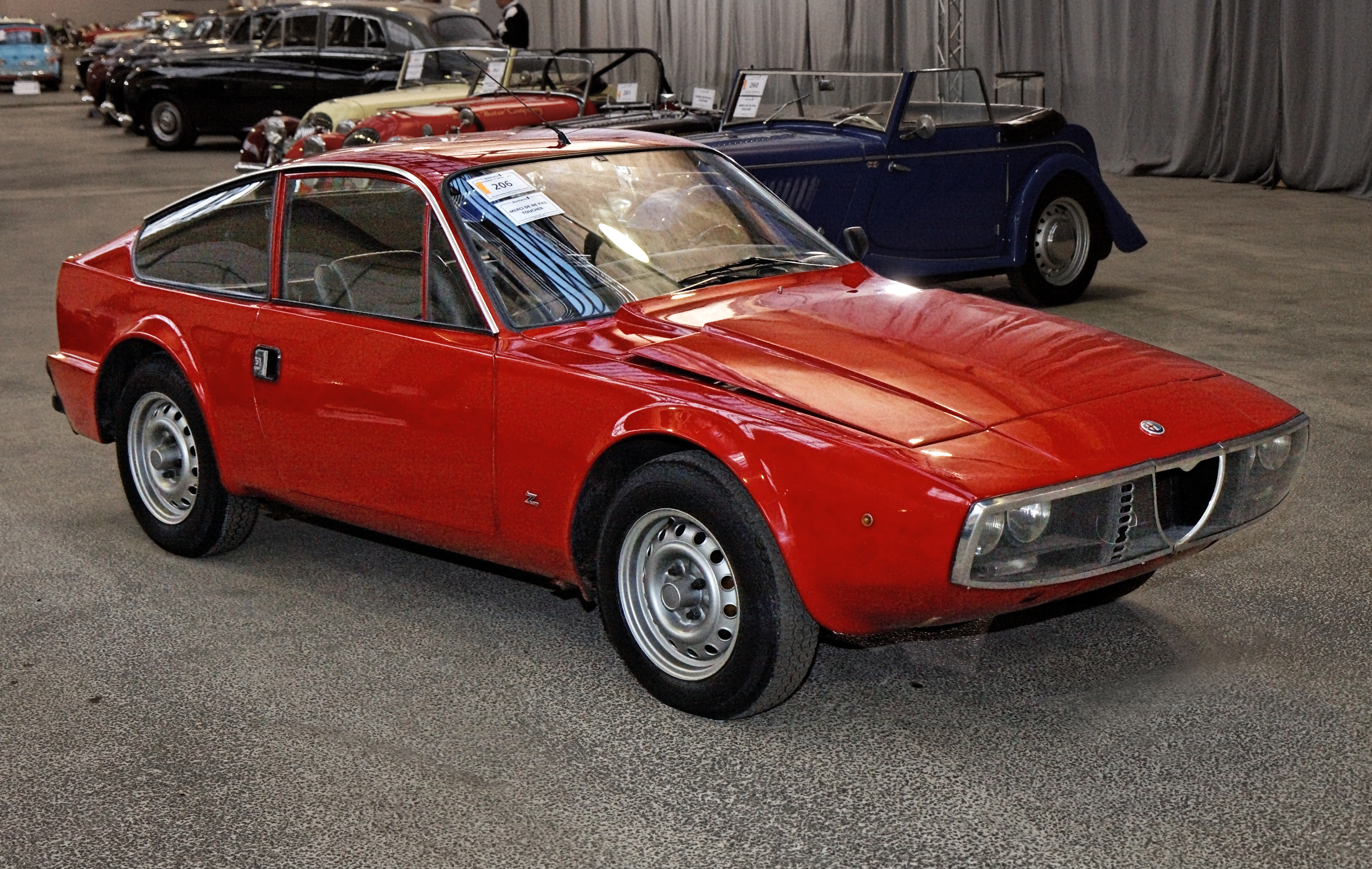
Junior Z

== Production ==
Year	1962	1963	1964	1965	1966	1967	1968	1969	1970	1971	1972	Sum
TI CKD	172	1,650	1,011	10	60	0	0	0	0	0	0	2,903
TI guida destra	0	301	960	151	0	0	0	0	0	0	0	1,412
TI Super	0	178	323	0	0	0	0	0	0	0	0	501
TI Cambio Volante	6,854	25,673	9,270	1,132	251	47	0	0	0	0	0	43,227
TI Cambio Cloche	0	0	9,996	8,011	4,743	856	0	0	0	0	0	23,606
1600 Sprint	3,702	3,388	17	0	0	0	0	0	0	0	0	7,107
1600 Spider	3,145	3,542	1,878	285	0	0	0	0	0	0	0	8,850
1600 Spider guida destra	0	333	67	0	0	0	0	0	0	0	0	400
Sprint GT	0	848	9,767	8,880	133	0	0	0	0	0	0	19,628
Sprint GT guida destra	0	0	674	651	29	0	0	0	0	0	0	1,354
Sprint GT CKD	0	0	398	522	0	0	0	0	0	0	0	920
Sprint GTC Cabriolet	0	0	106	548	247	0	0	0	0	0	0	901
Sprint GTC Cabriolet guida destra	0	0	0	54	45	0	0	0	0	0	0	99
Sprint Speciale	0	620	676	103	1	0	0	0	0	0	0	1,400
TZ 1	0	3	62	42	4	1	0	0	0	0	0	112
1300 Berlina	0	0	11,947	13,384	1,208	1,304	82	136	294	3	0	28,358
Spider veloce	0	0	290	801	0	0	0	0	0	0	0	1,091
Super	0	0	0	20,657	14,224	19,190	6,734	16,523	14,695	16,241	9,561	117,825
Super guida destra	0	0	0	355	453	697	70	345	357	532	356	3,165
Super CKD	0	0	0	60	939	143	522	516	360	480	580	3,600
GTA	0	0	0	356	21	61	0	12	0	0	0	450
GTA guida destra	0	0	0	50	0	0	0	0	0	0	0	50
GT Veloce	0	0	0	769	6,128	5,577	27	0	0	0	0	12,501
GT Veloce guida destra	0	0	0	0	583	822	2	0	0	0	0	1,407
GT Veloce CKD	0	0	0	0	190	142	0	0	0	0	0	332
1300 TI	0	0	0	766	23,465	27,381	31,742	31,187	25,382	681	80	140,684
1300 TI guida destra	0	0	0	0	0	238	296	340	245	0	0	1,119
1300 TI CKD	0	0	0	0	366	297	460	467	820	0	0	2,410
4R Zagato	0	0	0	12	51	29	0	0	0	0	0	92
Spider Duetto	0	0	0	0	3,265	2,677	3	0	1	0	0	5,946
Spider Duetto guida destra	0	0	0	0	98	281	0	0	0	0	0	379
GT 1300 Junior	0	0	0	0	3,175	12,367	11,905	14,854	12,968	14,175	6,628	76,072
GT 1300 Junior guida destra	0	0	0	0	1	471	607	602	486	544	240	2,951
GT 1300 Junior CKD	0	0	0	0	0	182	220	218	240	640	100	1,600
GTA 1300 Junior	0	0	0	0	0	0	320	82	8	22	15	447
Spider 1300 Junior	0	0	0	0	0	0	1,743	759	524	749	584	4,359
Spider 1300 Junior guida destra	0	0	0	0	0	0	97	81	1	0	0	179
1600 S	0	0	0	0	0	0	332	1,597	283	0	0	2,212
1600 S guida destra	0	0	0	0	0	0	0	3	0	0	0	3
Super Promiscua	0	0	0	0	0	0	5	9	0	0	0	14
Super Promiscua guida destra	0	0	0	0	0	0	1	1	0	0	0	2
GT 1300 Junior Zagato	0	0	0	0	0	0	0	0	566	358	184	1,108
1300 Super	0	0	0	0	0	0	0	0	4,452	37,713	23,555	65,720
1300 Super guida destra	0	0	0	0	0	0	0	0	0	257	263	520
1300 Super CKD	0	0	0	0	0	0	0	0	0	1,220	1,120	2,340
GT 1600 Junior	0	0	0	0	0	0	0	0	0	0	3,609	3,609
GT 1600 Junior guida destra	0	0	0	0	0	0	0	0	0	0	426	426
GT 1600 CKD	0	0	0	0	0	0	0	0	0	0	460	460
Spider 1600	0	0	0	0	0	0	0	0	0	0	928	928
Coupé Zagato	0	0	0	0	0	0	0	0	0	0	99	99
Total	13,873	36,536	47,442	57,599	59,680	72,763	55,168	67,732	61,682	73,615	48,788	594,878
Guida destra = right-hand drive; CKD = complete knock-down; Promiscua = Station wagon

== 2015 Alfa Romeo Giulia (952) ==
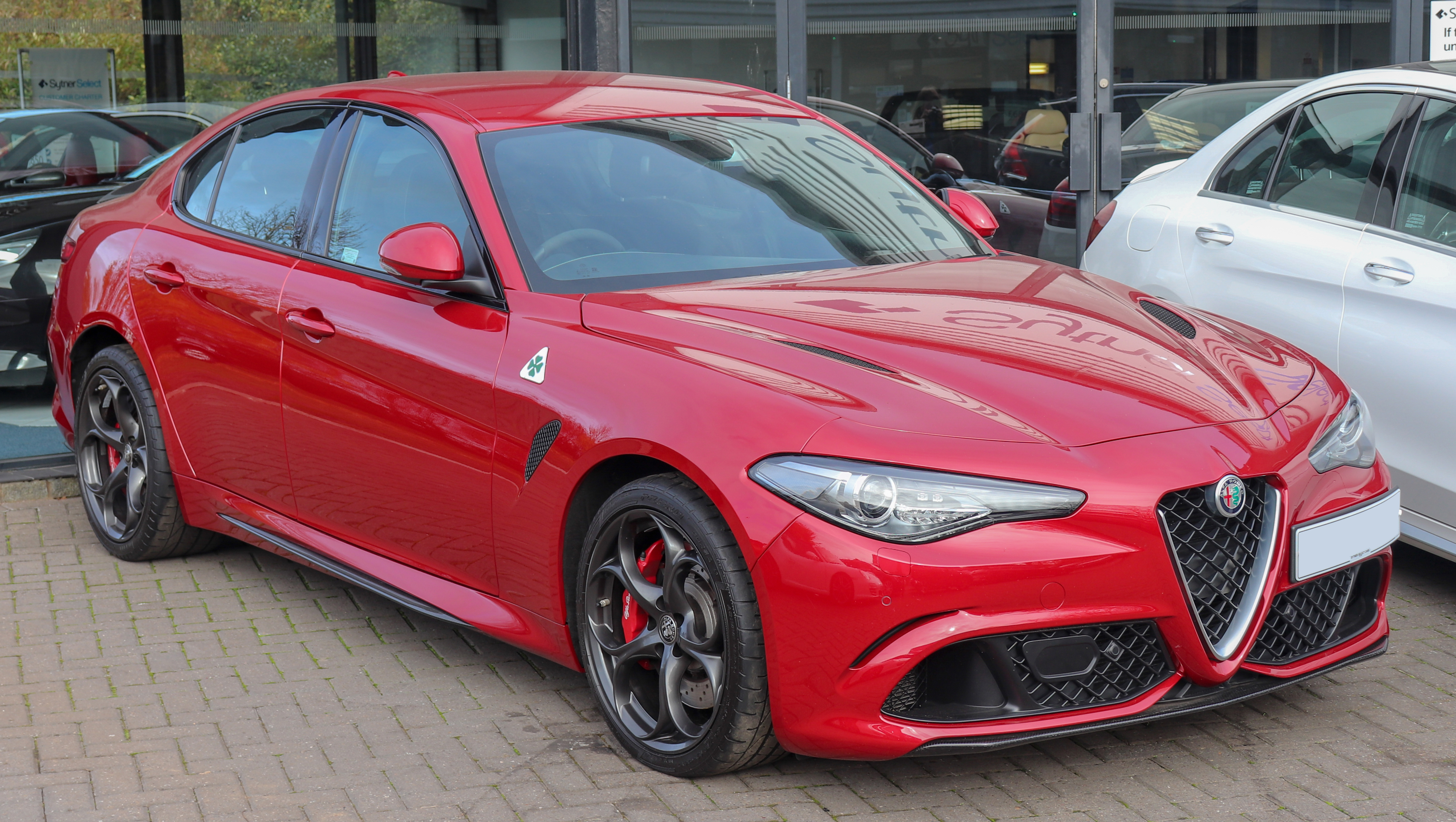
Alfa Romeo Giulia (2015)

The Giulia (952) compact executive car was unveiled on 24 June 2015 at the Museo Storico Alfa Romeo in Arese. The all-new model is the first product of the company's revival plan, which will see the brand return to a rear wheel drive platform with the option of all wheel drive. The new model was shown in the high-performance "Quadrifoglio" specification.

Following the success of the Giulia, Alfa Romeo unveiled the Stelvio - Alfa Romeo's first ever SUV - at the 2016 Los Angeles Auto Show. Production started at the Cassino Plant end of 2016, attaining top-Alfa sales by 2018.

The Giulia Quadrifoglio has been highly praised by the motoring press when compared against its nearest rivals, including the highly specified later generations of BMW M3, it has gone on to be voted "Best Super Saloon" 4 years running deposing BMW of the prime position between 2016 and 2020 (UK - Autocar Magazine)

== See also ==
- Alfa Romeo Sprint GT (Veloce)
- Alfa Romeo Spider
- Alfa Romeo Giulia TZ
- Alfa Romeo Giulia Sprint Speciale
- Alfa Romeo GTA
- Alfa Romeo Montreal
