= Alfa Romeo RM =

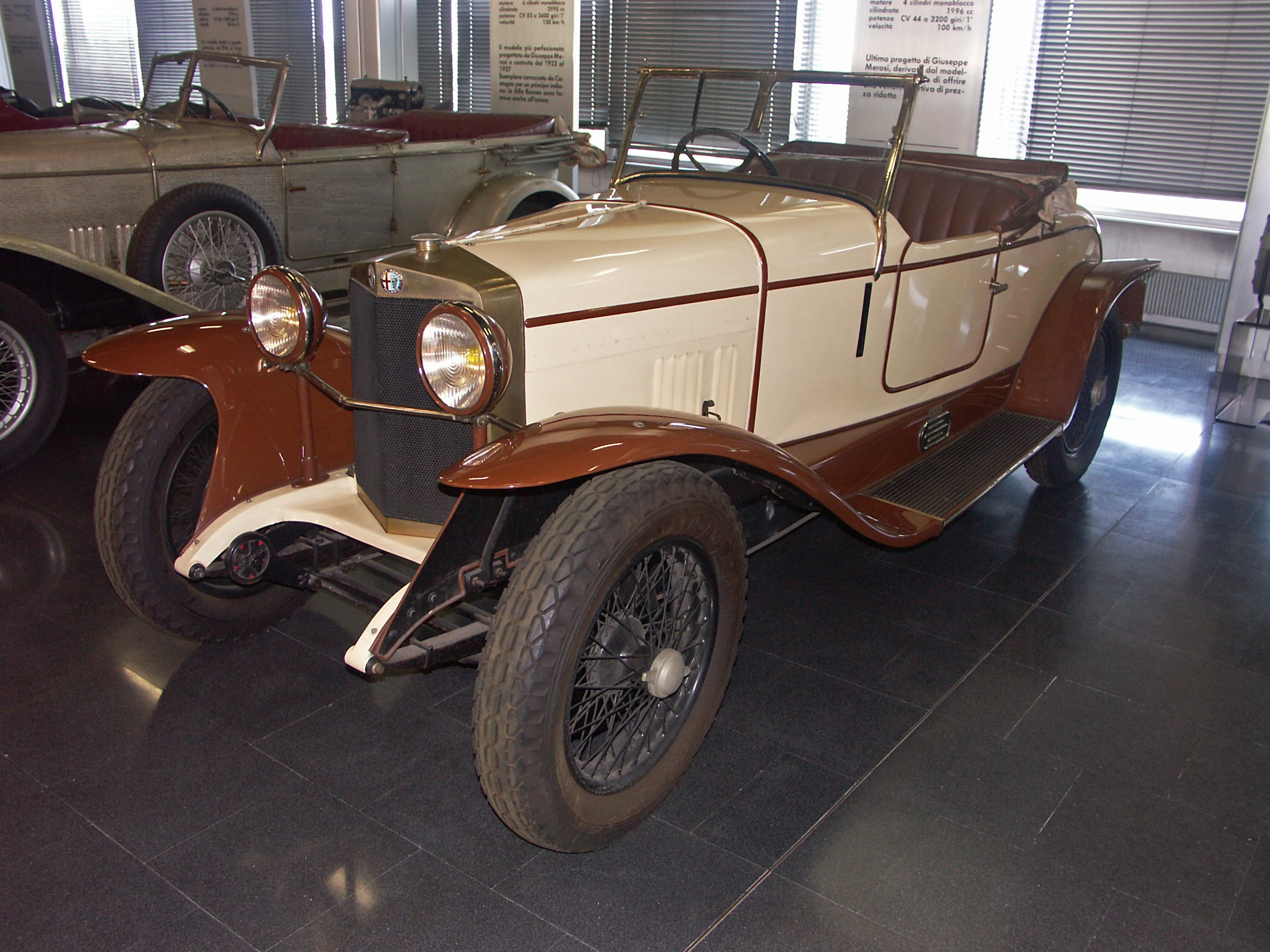
- Alfa Romeo RM Sport with Castagna body

Overview
- Manufacturer: Alfa Romeo
- Production: 1923–1925
- Assembly: Portello, Milan, Italy

Body and chassis
- Body style: limousine convertible
- Layout: FR layout

Powertrain
- Engine: 1.9 L I4; 2.0 L I4
- Transmission: 4-speed manual

Dimensions
- Wheelbase: 2,900 mm (114.2 in) (RM Sport)
- Length: 4,250 mm (167.3 in)
- Width: 1,680 mm (66.1 in)
- Height: 1,650 mm (65.0 in)
- Curb weight: 1,450 kg (3,197 lb)

Chronology
- Predecessor: Alfa Romeo RL
- Successor: Alfa Romeo 6C

The Alfa Romeo RM was produced between 1923 and 1925, based on the RL model. It was introduced for the first time at the 1923 Paris Motor Show and total production was around 500 cars. The RM had a 2.0 L inline-four engine which produced between 40 and 48 PS (29 and 35 kW). As were most of Alfa Romeo's cars, this was also used in motorsports. Three versions were made: Normal, Sport and Unificato. Sport had a raised compression ratio, and Unificato had longer wheelbase and a slightly bigger engine. The RM's top speed was around 90 km/h (56 mph).

Models
| Model | Engine displacement | Max power | Years produced |
|---|---|---|---|
| RM Normal | 1944 cc | 40 PS (29 kW) | (1923) |
| RM Sport | 1944 cc | 44 PS (32 kW) | (1924) |
| RM Unificato | 1996 cc | 48 PS (35 kW) | (1925) |

== Alfa Romeo half-track ==
A very rare half-track version based on the RM was built in the 1920s. The half-track used the RM's inline-four engine modified to work with dry sump lubrication. The track used was licensed from Citroën Kégresse; only one example is known to survive.
