= ALFA 15 HP =

A.L.F.A. 15 HP
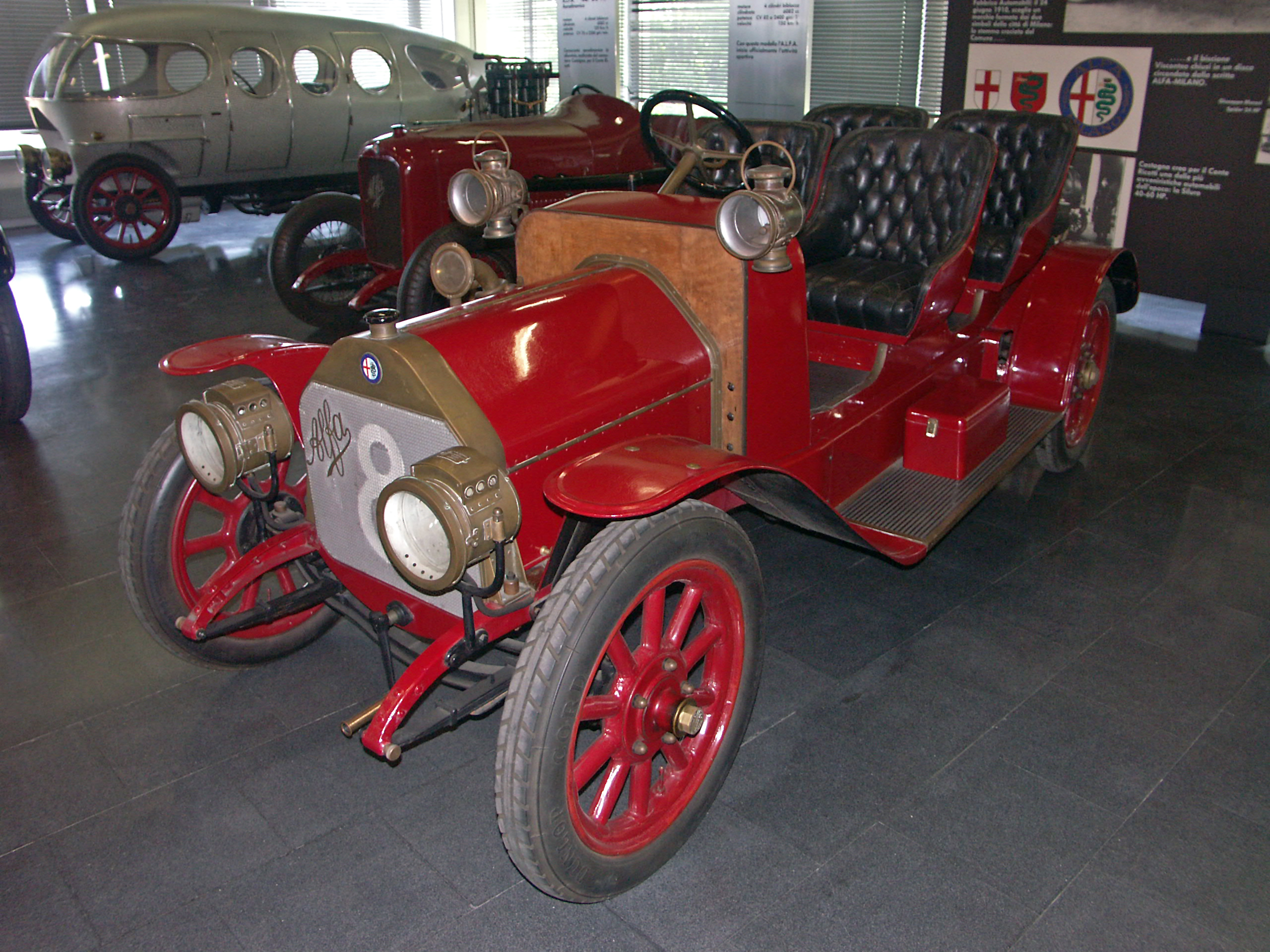

Overview
- Manufacturer: A.L.F.A.
- Production: 1911–1913
- Assembly: Portello, Milan, Italy

Body and chassis
- Layout: Front-engine, rear-wheel drive

Powertrain
- Engine: 2.4 L I4
- Transmission: 3-speed manual

Dimensions
- Wheelbase: 2,920 mm (115.0 in)
- Length: 3,780 mm (148.8 in)
- Width: 1,400 mm (55.1 in)
- Curb weight: 920 kg (2,028 lb)

Chronology
- Predecessor: A.L.F.A 12 HP
- Successor: A.L.F.A 15-20 HP

The A.L.F.A 15 HP is a medium size car produced by A.L.F.A., a company that later became Alfa Romeo, from 1911 to 1913.

The model was derived from the A.L.F.A. 12 HP and had a four-cylinder engine with 2,413 cc of displacement. Compared to the predecessor, the displacement was unchanged, but power output was increased. The 15-HP engine had a compression ratio of 4.2:1 and developed a maximum output of 24 hp (18 kW) at 2,400 rpm. Bore and stroke were, respectively, 80 and 120 mm (3.1 and 4.7 in). It was a front-engine, rear-wheel-drive car. The 15 HP had a three-speed gearbox, and was equipped with a parking brake. The track was 1,300 mm (51.2 in). The 15 HP was available in two types of body: torpedo and saloon. The car had a top speed of 95 km/h (59 mph). It was designed by Giuseppe Merosi and was priced at 9,500 lire.

== Sources ==
- Owen, David (1985). Grandi Marche - Alfa Romeo. Milano: Edizioni Acanthus.
