= ALFA 20/30 HP =

Alfa Romeo 20/30 HP
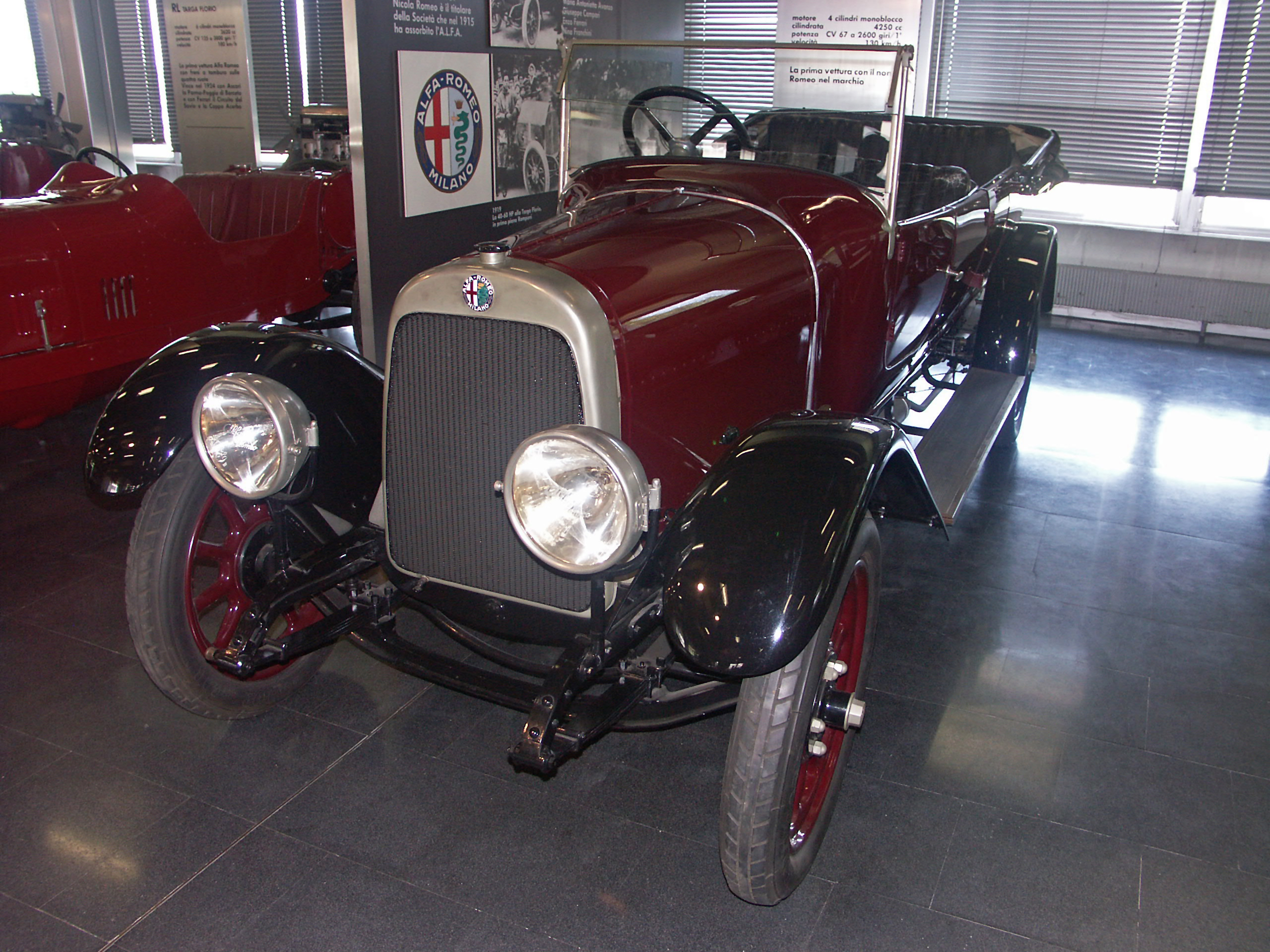
- Alfa Romeo 20/30 HP ES

Overview
- Manufacturer: Alfa Romeo
- Production: 1914–1922
- Assembly: Italy: Portello, Milan
- Designer: Giuseppe Merosi

Body and chassis
- Body style: Berlina; Torpedo
- Layout: FR layout

Powertrain
- Engine: 4.1 L I4 sidevalve 4084 cc 4.2 L I4 sidevalve 4250 cc
- Transmission: 4-speed manual

Chronology
- Predecessor: 24 HP

The ALFA (later Alfa Romeo) 20/30 HP was a four-cylinder passenger car produced from 1914 to 1922 with three cars using this nameplate: a 4-6-seater tourer, improved version 20/30 HP E in 1914 and 1921 the 20/30 HP ES Sport, a 4-seater sportscar.

== The Alfa 20/30 HP ==
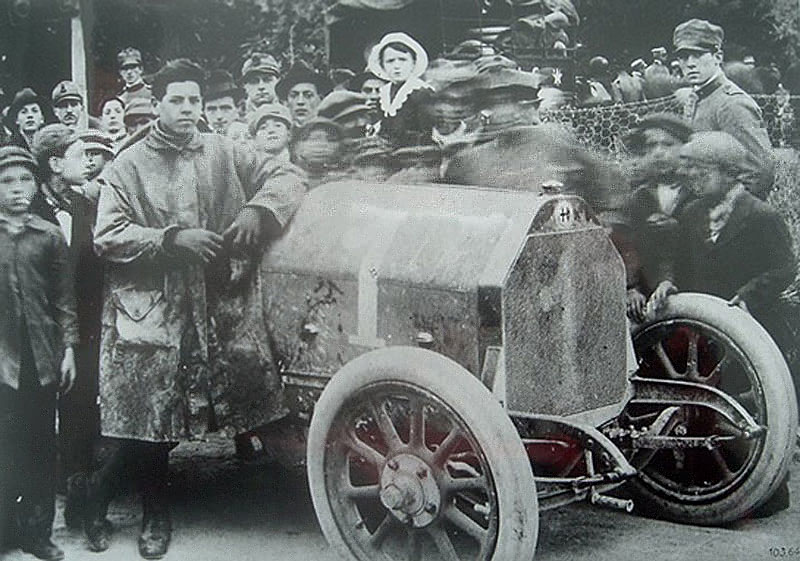
Giulio Ramponi in an A.L.F.A 24 series E in 1920

The Alfa Romeo "Torpedo" 20/30HP was the first car under the ALFA brand to formally carry the Alfa Romeo name. It was equipped with a 4250 cc sidevalve inline-four engine producing 67bhp. The car was intended for a launch amongst the upper classes of Italy, so the price was notably high- around three times that of the Ford Model T, a large sum of money when one considers the post-World War I economy.

The ALFA 20/30 HP was almost identical to the 24 HP of 1910 and was often simply called the HP 24 Serie E. The 24 HP's engine was reused completely, save for a sidechain on the camshaft to reduce noise. The maximum power was increased to 49bhp at 2400rpm, and the top speed increased to 115 km/h (71 mph). The vehicle was available in two body variants: A Berlina chassis and a torpedo variant.

At the outbreak of World War I on August 3, 1914, Italy declared itself neutral. ALFA plants, as such, had not been directly affected by war, or by manufacturing related to the war effort. Production numbers between 1914 and 1915 totaled 285 finished 20/30 HP models. In 1915, the production totals decreased to 95 frames for the 20/30 HP, which were only completed in 1920.

== Alfa Romeo 20/30 ES Sport ==
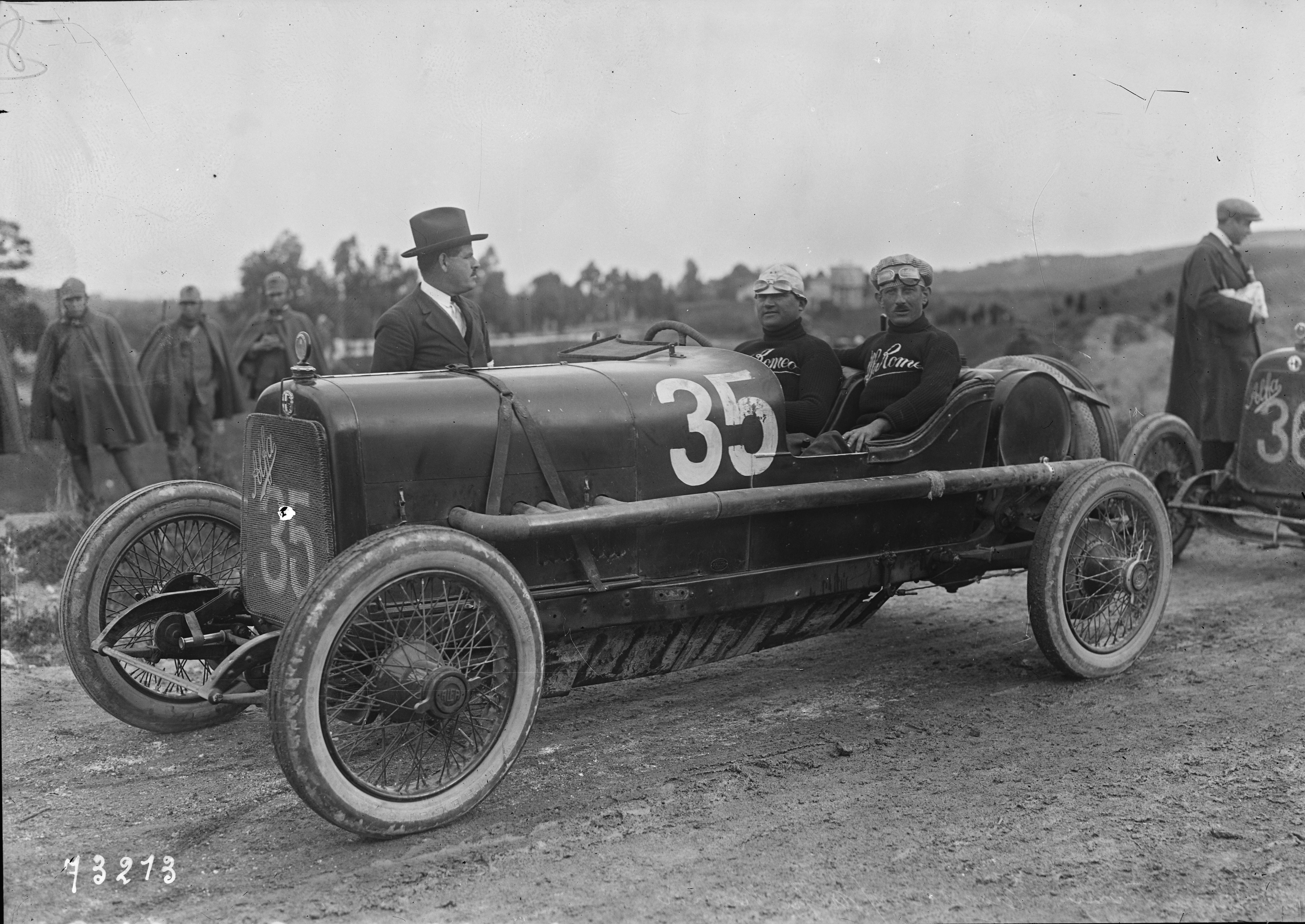
Antonio Ascari in his Alfa Romeo 20-30 ES at the 1922 Targa Florio

The ES Sport was based on the 1914 20/30 E model, the "S" being added to emphasize the sportiness of the car. Notably, the ES had electric lights and an electric starter. The chassis was shortened from previous models as well.

Price was a major negative factor, and only 124 were ever produced. Notably, it is with the ES that Enzo Ferrari began his racing career with teammates Antonio Ascari and Ugo Sivocci.

- Engine: 4 cylinders inline
- Displacement: 4250 cc
- Power: 67 bhp at 2600 rpm
- Top speed: 130 km/h (81 mph)
