= ALFA 12 HP =

A.L.F.A. 12 HP
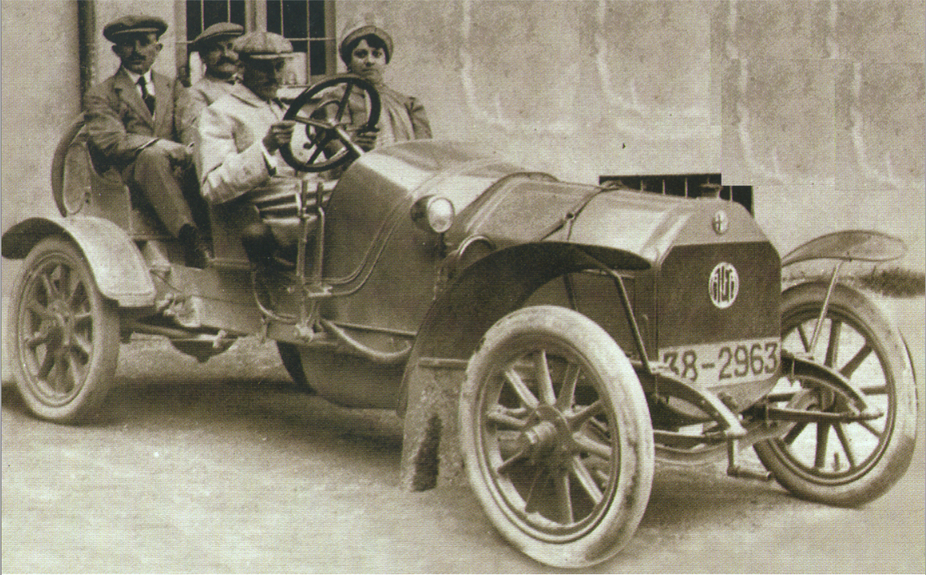

Overview
- Manufacturer: A.L.F.A.
- Production: 1910–1911
- Assembly: Portello, Milan, Italy

Body and chassis
- Layout: Front-engine, rear-wheel drive

Powertrain
- Engine: 2.4 L I4
- Transmission: 4-speed manual

Dimensions
- Wheelbase: 2,920 mm (115.0 in)
- Length: 3,780 mm (148.8 in)
- Width: 1,400 mm (55.1 in)
- Curb weight: 920 kg (2,028 lb)

Chronology
- Successor: A.L.F.A 15 HP

The A.L.F.A. 12 HP was the second car produced by ALFA, a manufacturer who would later become Alfa Romeo.

The car was launched in the markets following the success of the 24 HP, first car made by A.L.F.A. It was a smaller car with a four-cylinder engine, 2,413 cc of displacement and 22 hp of power at 2,100 rpm (12 HP in model name referred instead to the fiscal horsepower. Bore and stroke were, respectively, 80 and 120 mm (3.1 and 4.7 in). The engine was at the front, while the traction was at the back. It had a four speed gearbox and drum brakes. Both engine and body were derived from 24 HP model. The track was 1,300 mm (51.2 in) and it was available as a torpedo and saloon bodystyles. It was designed by Giuseppe Merosi. The car reached a top speed of 90 km/h (56 mph) and was on sale at 9,500 lire.

== Bibliography ==
- Sannia, Alessandro (2010). Alfa Romeo - 100 anni di leggenda. Milano: Gribaudo. ISBN 978-88-7906-972-4.
- Owen, David (1985). Grandi Marche - Alfa Romeo. Milano: Edizioni Acanthus.
