= Portello (district of Milan) =

- Quartiere of Milan
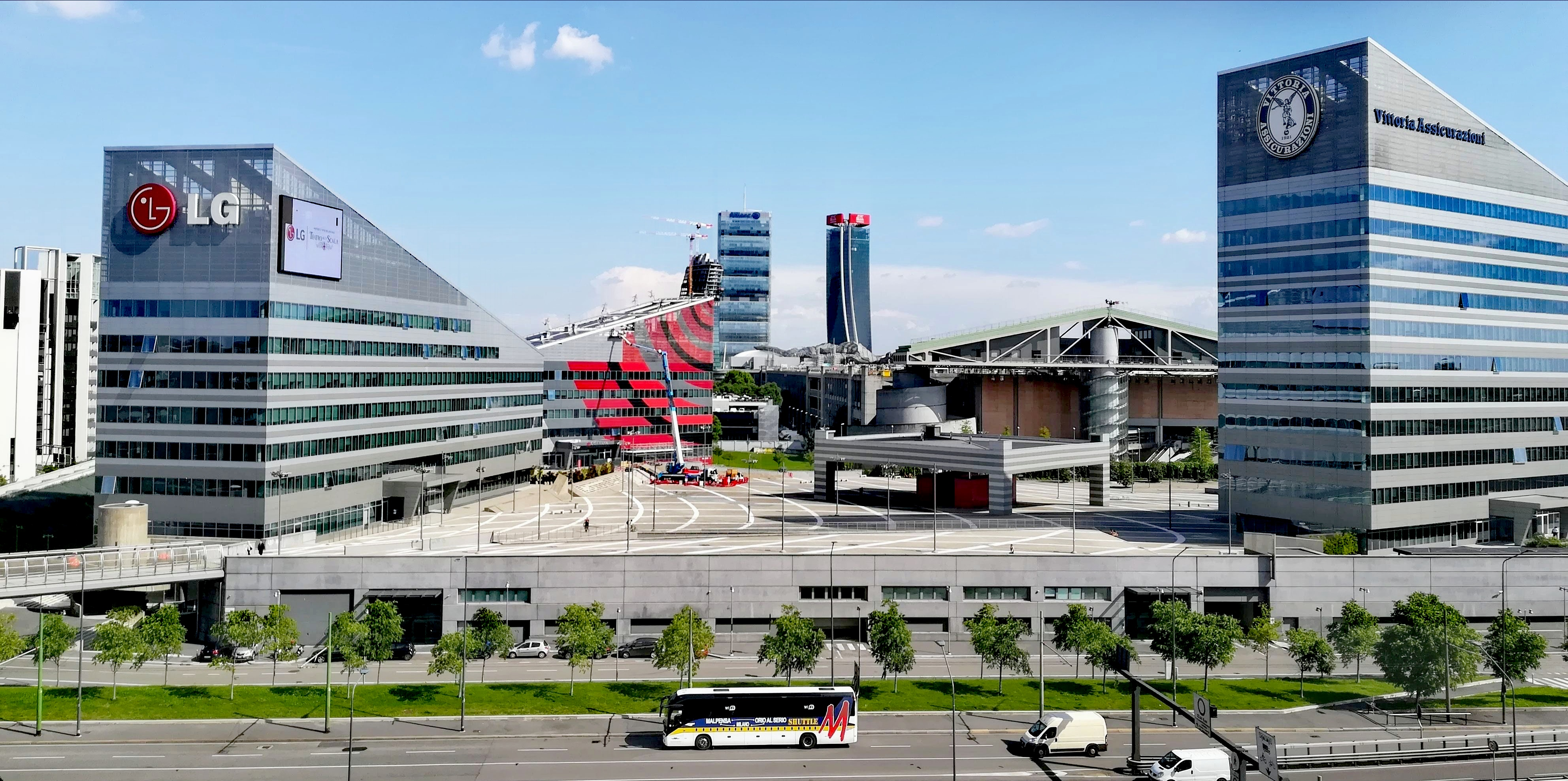

- Location within Milan Location within Italy
- Coordinates: 45°29′4.06″N 9°8′51.63″E
- Country: Italy
- Region: Lombardy
- Province: Milan
- Comune: Milan
- Zone: 8
- Time zone: UTC+1 (CET)
  - Summer (DST): UTC+2 (CEST)

Portello is a district ("quartiere") of Milan, Italy, part of the Zone 8 administrative division of the city, located north-west of the centre. It is best known as a car-manufacturing area, as it used to house facilities of Alfa Romeo (now dismissed), Darracq, Citroën, and Fiat. The district also includes one of the major shopping malls in north-western Milan. It is crossed by the Circonvallazione ring road. Portello is adjacent to the new CityLife district.

== History ==
Portello was one of the major urban requalification process in Milan, as the former Alfa Romeo area (385,000 m^{2}) is now being restructured. The project includes a major park called Parco Vittoria and what will become the largest plaza in Milan (20,000 m^{2}), as well as commercial, service and housing infrastructures.

The name of the district comes from the "Strada del Portello" (Portello road), an ancient rural road that used to connect Milan to Rho, and that was later replaced by the new Strada del Sempione ("Simplon Road") leading to the Simplon Pass; the old Portello road is now known as "Via Traiano". In turn, the road was named after the Portello city gate, that was part of the city walls and that was located in the surroundings of the modern Cadorna railway station.

== Parco Vittoria ==
The design of Parco Vittoria, by architects Charles Jencks and Andreas Kipar, includes several unusual elements, and it is based on the general theme of time. It will comprise a large round lake, with a strip-shaped promontory that will allow pedestrians to walk to the center of the lake itself. A helix shaped hill (called "The Spiral of Time") will provide a panoramic view of the city; an artistic representation of the double DNA helix will be placed on top of the hill. Both the lake and the hill will be part of a park section called "Time Garden", partitioned into three areas dedicated to prehistory, history and present times.

== Grand Prix racing ==
The district hosted a city circuit in which 1947 Italian Grand Prix was held.

== See also ==
- Alfa Romeo Portello Plant
