= Lancia Appia =

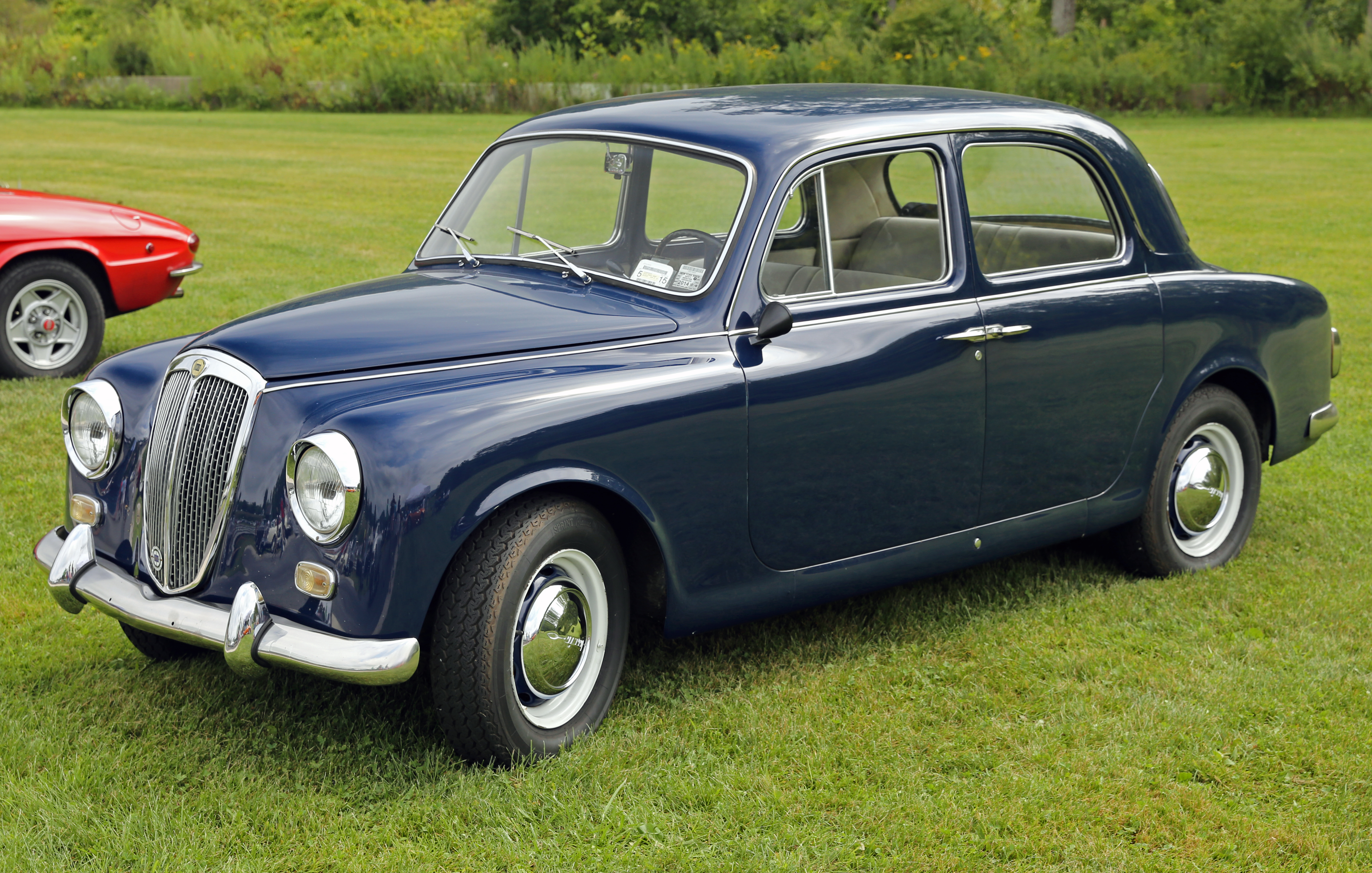
- Lancia Appia Berlina, second series

Overview
- Manufacturer: Lancia
- Production: 1953–1963
- Designer: Pinin Farina (Coupé); Giovanni Michelotti at Vignale (Convertibile and Lusso); Zagato (Appia Zagato)

Body and chassis
- Class: Small family car
- Body style: 4-door saloon; 2-door saloon (Vignale); 2-door coupé (Pinin Farina); 2-door coupé (Zagato); 2-door convertible (Vignale); 3-door estate (Viotti); 2-door Panel van; 2-door Pickup; 2-door Ambulance
- Layout: Front-engine, rear-wheel-drive
- Related: Lancia Aurelia

Powertrain
- Engine: 1.1 L Lancia V4 (petrol)
- Transmission: 4-speed manual

Dimensions
- Wheelbase: 2,480 mm (97.6 in) S. 1; 2,510 mm (98.8 in) S. 2, S. 3
- Length: 3,865 mm (152.2 in); 4,010 mm (157.9 in) S. 2; 4,020 mm (158.3 in) S. 3
- Width: 1,420 mm (55.9 in); 1,485 mm (58.5 in) S. 2; 1,390 mm (54.7 in) S. 3
- Height: 1,422 mm (56.0 in); 1,405 mm (55.3 in) S. 2; 1,450 mm (57.1 in) S. 3
- Kerb weight: 820–920 kg (1,808–2,028 lb)

Chronology
- Predecessor: Lancia Ardea
- Successor: Lancia Fulvia

The Lancia Appia is a passenger car introduced in 1953 by Italian car manufacturer Lancia as a replacement for the Ardea, and which remained in production for ten years. The Appia was the last in a long line of Lancia production cars dating back to the Lancia Lambda (introduced in 1922) to use sliding pillar front suspension. All three series produced had a 1089cc Lancia V4 engine.

In addition to the saloon, a number of special bodied Appias were produced, including a coupé by Pinin Farina, a convertible and 2-door saloon by Vignale and an aluminium-bodied GT by Zagato, as well as light commercial vehicle variants. In total 107,000 Appia were built: 98,000 saloons, 3,863 commercial vehicles, and 5,161 chassis supplied to coachbuilders. Following a custom started in the postwar years, the new model was named after a Roman consular road, the Via Appia.

== The saloon ==
=== Background ===
In 1950 Lancia had introduced its first all-new postwar model, the Lancia Aurelia, a small but expensive luxury car with sophisticated engineering features like the first ever V6 engine, inboard rear brakes and a transaxle gearbox. Alongside it Lancia was still producing the Lancia Ardea, a pre-war design that although once innovative was in need of replacement. The new small Lancia was designed under engineer Vittorio Jano. Initially an updated version of the Ardea's 17° V4 engine was considered, but a clean-sheet design was ultimately chosen. At little over 10°, the new V4 had the narrowest angle of any V4 engine, and used solutions unprecedented at Lancia, like dual in-block camshafts in place of overhead ones. As the Ardea resembled a scaled-down Aprilia, the Appia mimicked the Aurelia's appearance, substituting its exotic parts with more cost-effective ones, such as a solid axle and a four-speed gearbox in block with the engine. For its mechanical features—sliding pillar front suspension, V4 engine, rear-wheel drive, absence of a centre pillar—the Appia can be considered the last in a line of Lancias which stretched back to the 1922 Lambda.

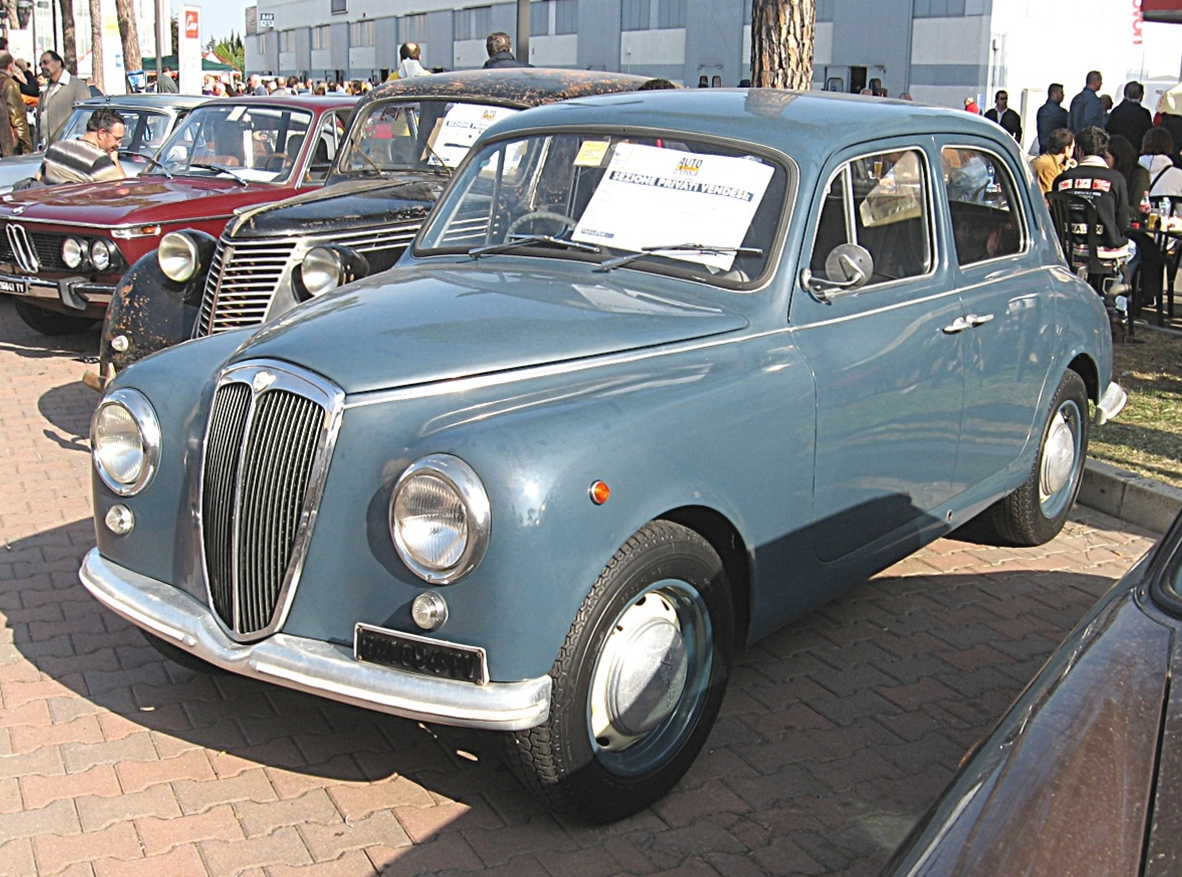
First series Appia Berlina

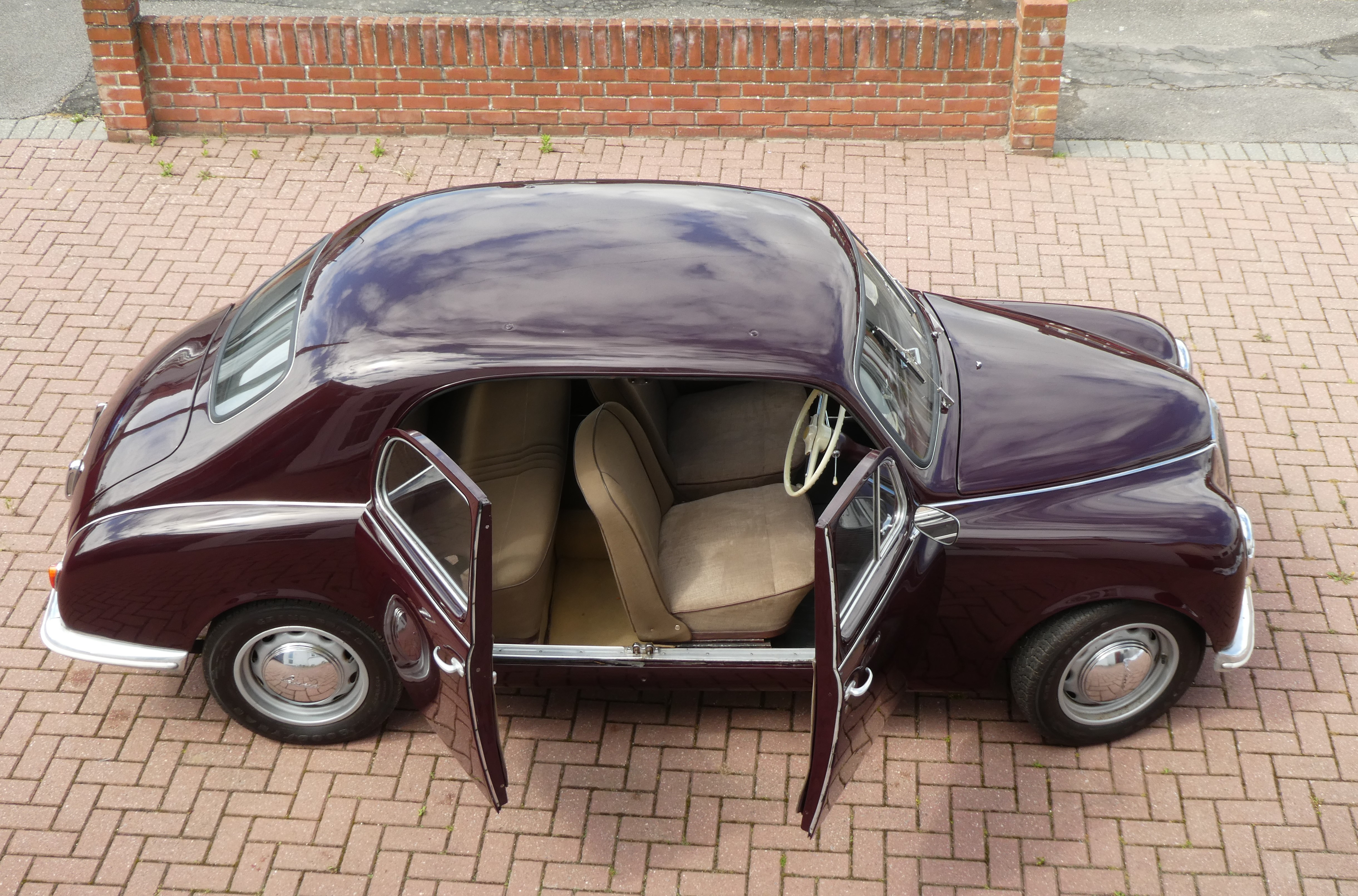
First series Berlina, demonstrating the door opening

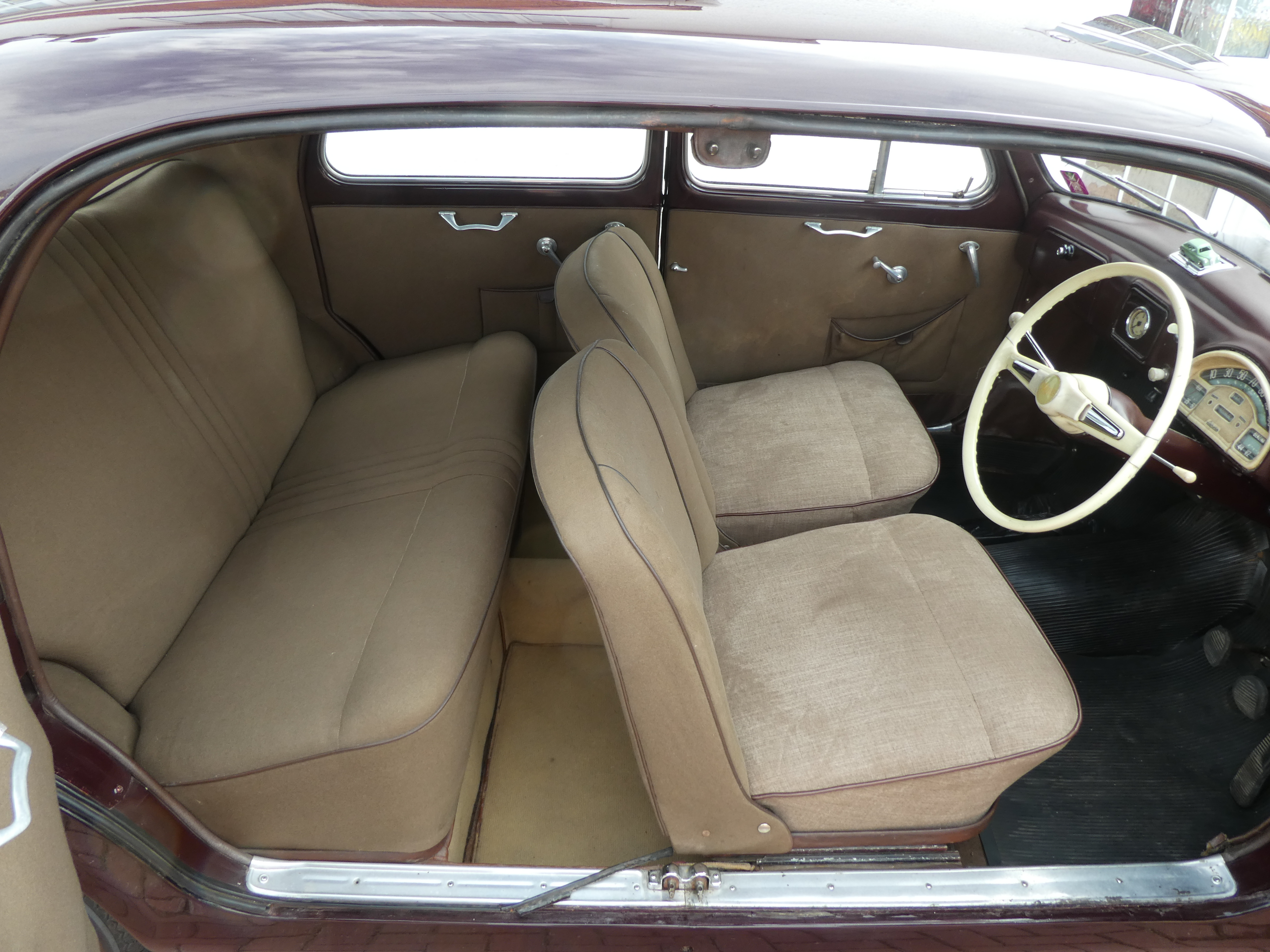
First series Berlina interior

=== First series ===
The Appia Berlina (saloon/sedan) was introduced in April 1953 at the Turin Motor Show. The chassis code is C10 for the right hand drive saloon—the standard version, as was customary at Lancia—and C10S (from Sinistra, Italian for "left") for the left hand drive variant, available on request. Under the Appia's bonnet there is a 38 PS 1.1-litre engine, which according to the manufacturer could push the car to 120 km/h (75 mph). The body style is similar to the Lancia Aurelia. To save weight the doors and rear fenders of the first few thousand examples were aluminium. The bumpers were also aluminium, making them easily dented. Rubber stripping was added later, to protect them from minor impacts. In a design inaugurated by the 1933 Lancia Augusta, rear doors were aft-hinged suicide doors, eliminating the B-pillar. A spare tyre, the fuel filler and the battery were located in the trunk/boot. The interior featured bucket front seats, a column-mounted shifter, ivory plastic steering wheel and switches, and panno Lancia wool cloth upholstery in grey or beige. Running on 155HR15 Pirelli Cinturato tyres. In total 20,025 first series saloons were made, from 1953 to 1956. Of these, the majority—10,257—were right hand drive, and the remaining 9,768 left hand drive.

The Appia sold in smaller numbers than projected. In 1956, Italian car magazine Quattroruote attributed this to the price, competition from the Fiat 1100/103 and Alfa Romeo Giulietta, and a host of minor flaws, e.g., the aluminium bumpers (which however were shared with early Aurelias) — indicating a hasty, low-priority development when Lancia was diverting many of its limited resources to its sports car racing efforts.

=== Second series ===
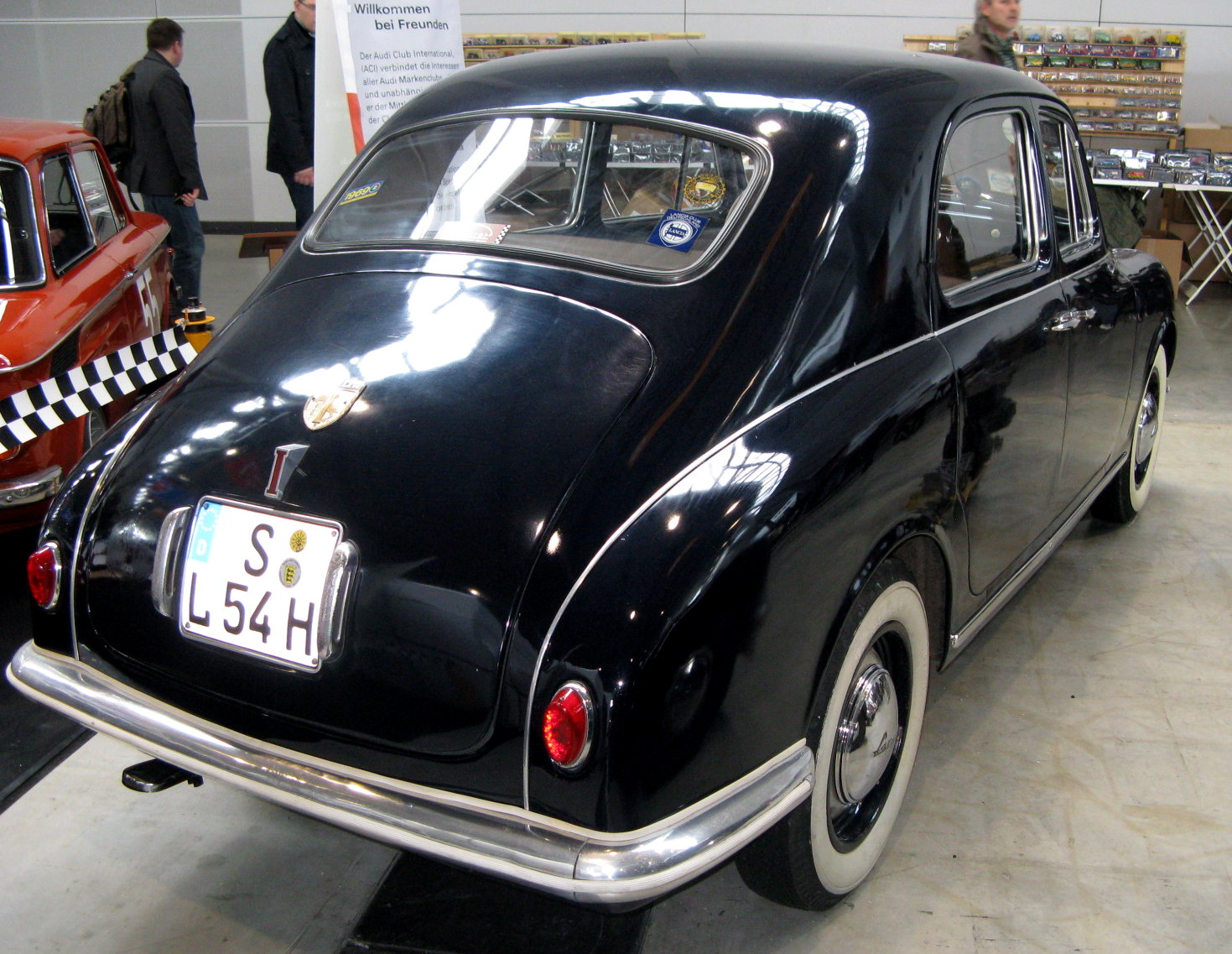

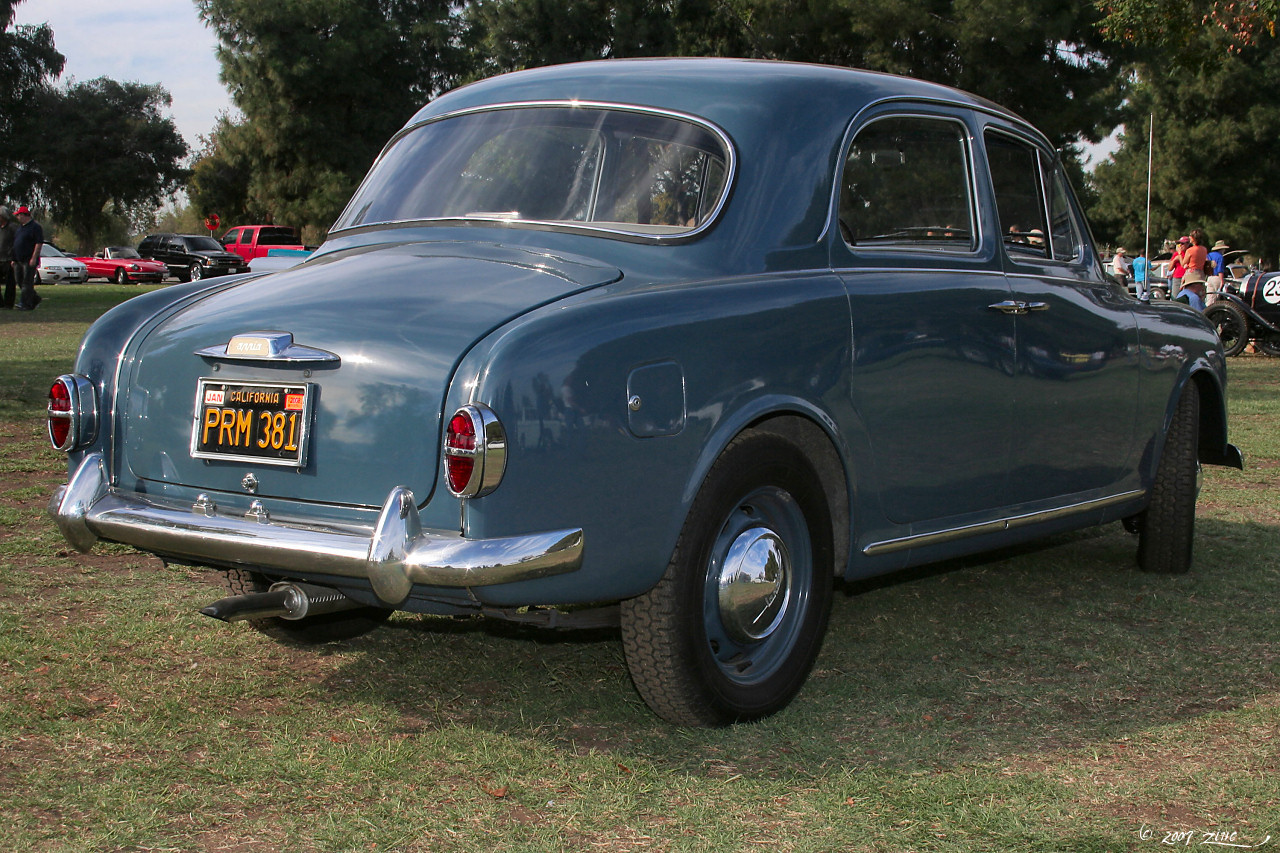
Comparison of first (top) and second series rear views

In April 1955 engineer Antonio Fessia joined Lancia as technical director, and started off fixing the Appia's shortcomings. Jano left shortly after, when Lancia withdrew from Formula 1. The resulting second series Appia, introduced at the Geneva Motor Show in March 1956, had a more powerful engine, a modernized body and better interior room, although the bucket seats were replaced with a bench seat and there was a considerable weight increase, which largely cancelled out the increase in power . The C10 and C10S type codes were kept. The rear part of the body had been redesigned to enlarge the boot, and the wheelbase was stretched by 3 cm (1.2 in) to provide better rear seat accommodation; this resulted in a 14.5 cm (5.7 in) growth in length. From the front the second series could be recognized from its rectangular instead of round turn signal lamps and the steel bumpers with overriders. The fuel filler cap was moved outside, under a locking flap on the right hand side rear wing. Fessia's changes to the engine included lowering the compression ratio, redesigning the cylinder head incorporating hemispherical combustion chambers and a new arrangement of the valves, new pistons, a new carburettor and different camshaft profiles. Output increased to 43 PS, and top speed to 120 km/h (75 mph). In the cabin a front bench seat took place of the two single ones, the binnacle held two round instruments, and steering wheel and switchgear went from ivory to black.

Despite—previously critical—Quattroruote having declared the Appia "finally accomplished and convincing", sales did not take off yet. In May 1958 daily production still lingered at 27 cars per day, far short of the 50 anticipated during the car's development. In total 22,425 second series saloons were made, only 3,180 of them C10 right hand drive cars.

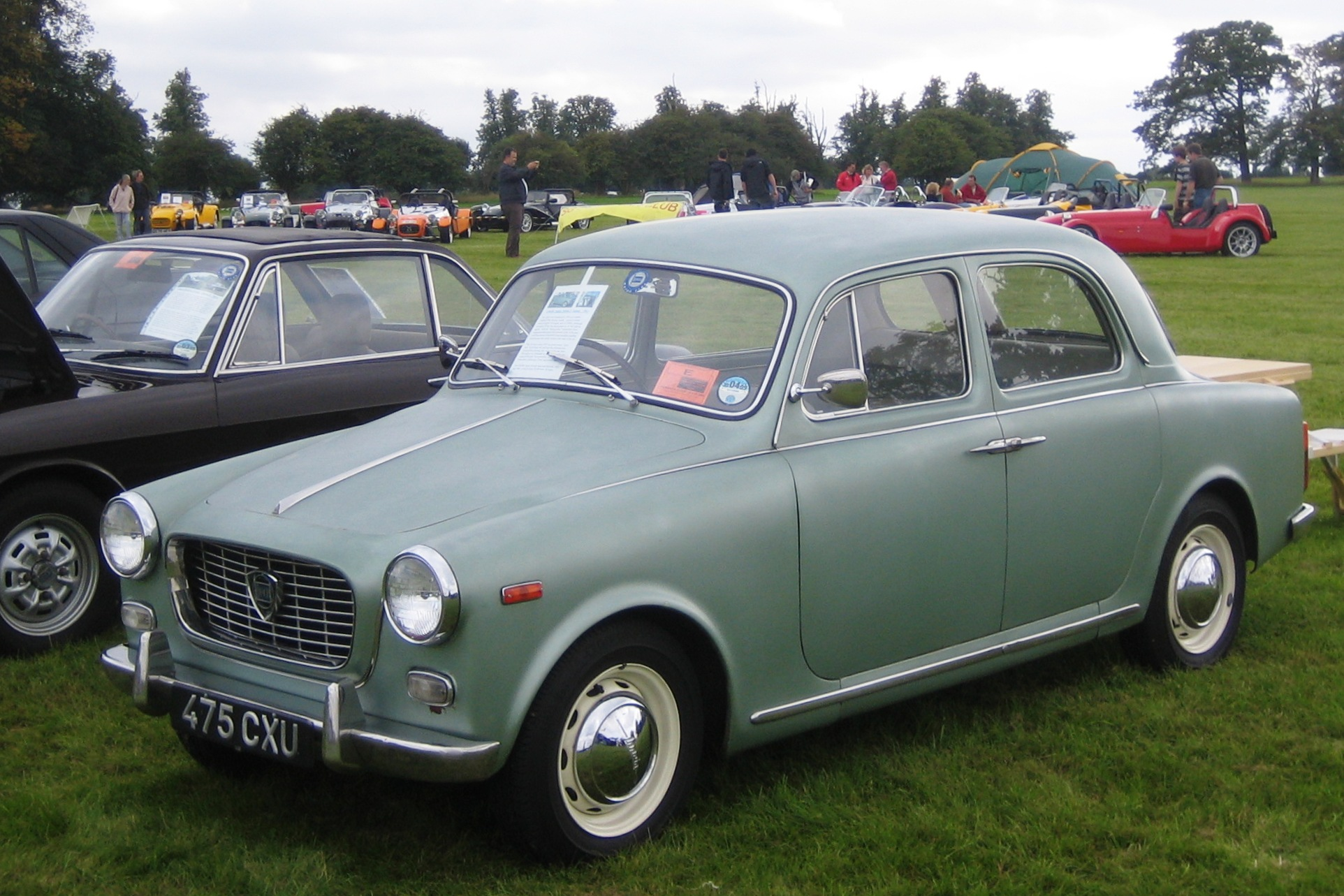
Third series saloon

=== Third series ===
In March 1959, the third series Appia was introduced at the Geneva Motor Show with a new front end. Lancia's traditional radiator shell-style grille was ultimately abandoned, in favour of an horizontal one inspired by the Lancia Flaminia flagship. Engine power went up again to 48 PS, as did top speed, to 132 km/h (82 mph). The braking system was improved with twin leading shoe front drum brakes and a "Duplex" dual hydraulic circuit during the 1960 model year. Model designations were different from the previous two series: 808.807 for the LHD variant, and 808.808 for the RHD one. In its third iteration the Appia was finally mature, and 55,577 saloons were made, the vast majority in left hand drive.

=== Replacing the Appia ===
At the end of the 1950s, with third series Appia sales soaring, Lancia CEO Fidanza advocated preparing a fourth series with an all-new body. Fessia, a strong proponent of front-wheel drive, was reluctant about updating the old design, and moreover one that was Jano's brainchild. In the end Fessia had the upper hand, as Fidanza had come to grips with the board and resigned. The Lancia Fulvia was developed and introduced in 1963, a clean-sheet design reprising the longitudinal front-wheel drive layout of Fessia's larger Flavia, but with Lancia's final narrow vee V4 engine.

== Commercial variants ==
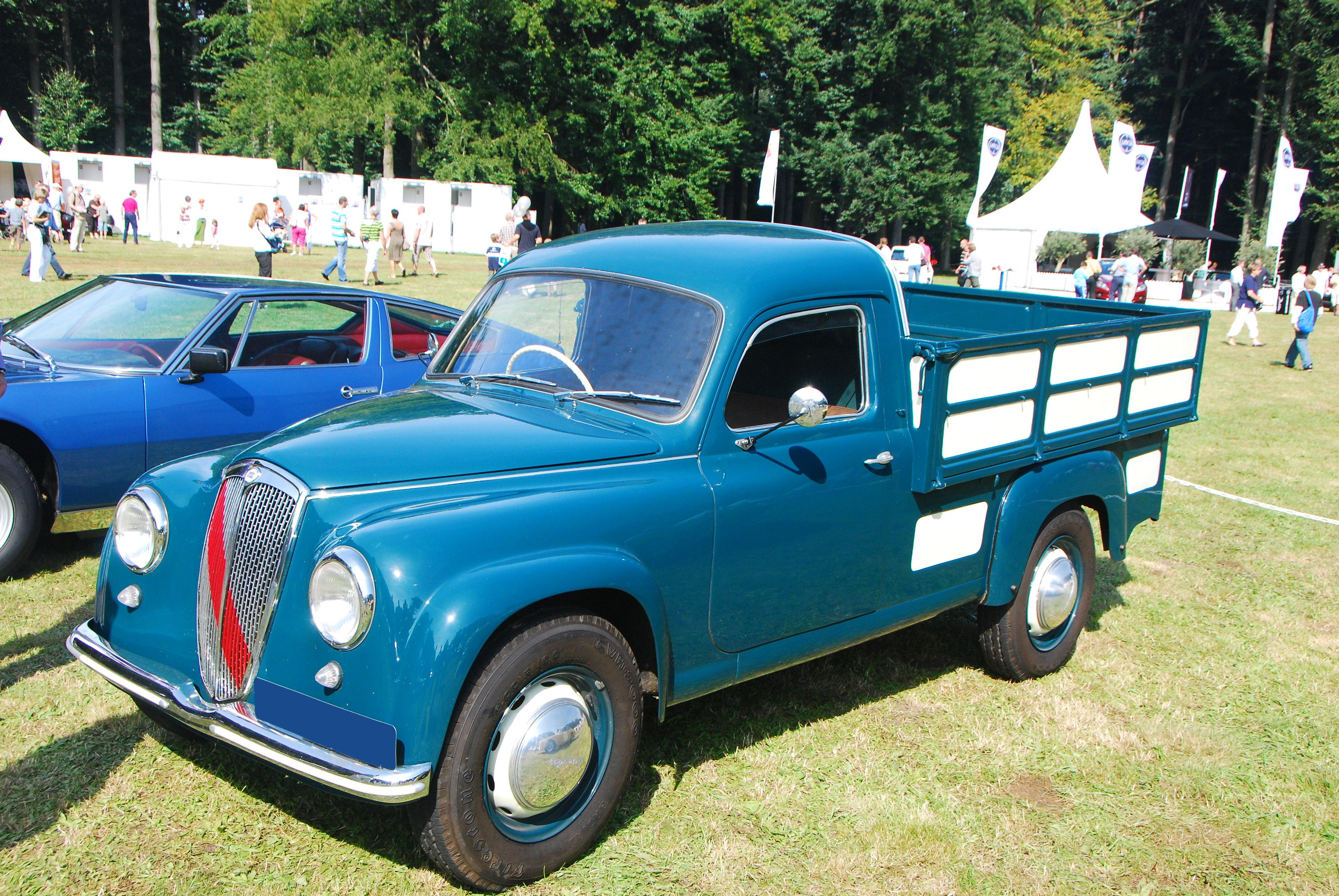
Appia C83 pick-up

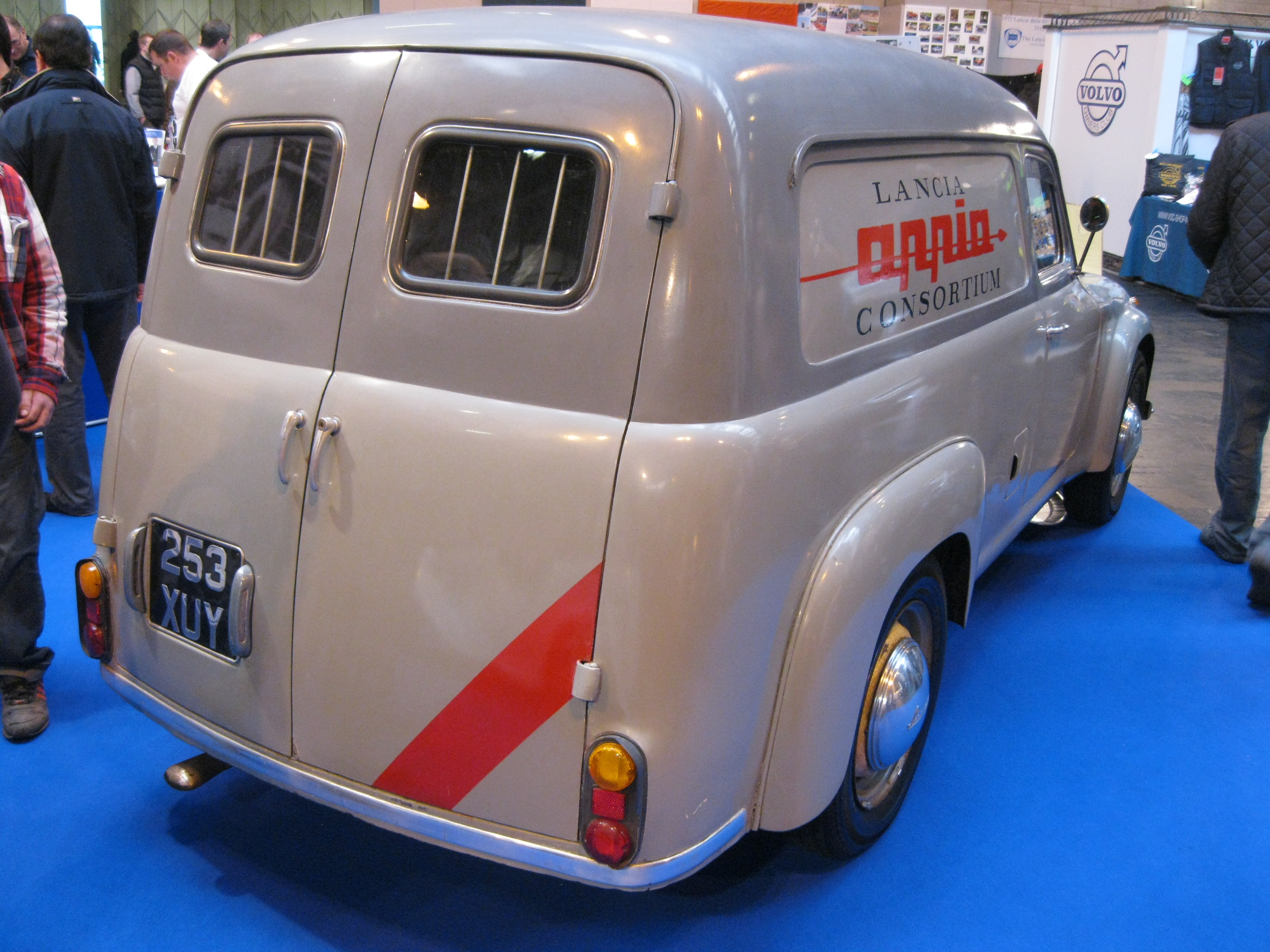
Appia C10 van

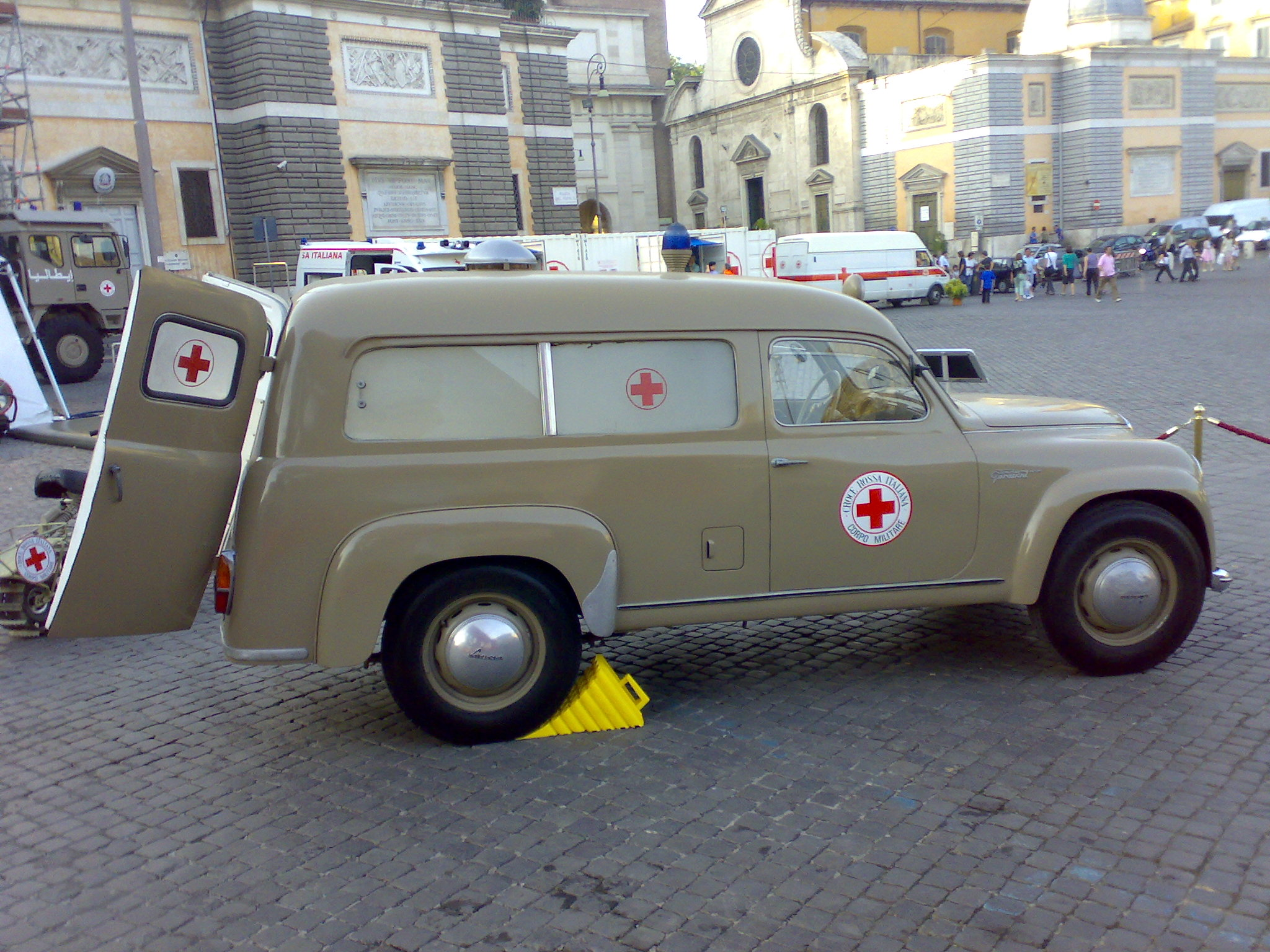
Appia C86S ambulance

Starting with 1954 Lancia also built light commercial bodies on the Appia chassis, replacing the analogous versions of the earlier Ardea. Three models were offered: the Furgoncino panel van (chassis code C80 or C80S for left hand drive), Camioncino pick-up (C83 or C83S), and an ambulance based on the Furgoncino, the Autolettiga (C86 or C86S). In respect to the saloon, all had shorter final drives, lower horsepower engines, widened axle tracks, upsized 16-inch wheels and larger tyres—and consequently bodywork altered to accept these modifications. With the introduction of the second series Appia in 1954 all three models received upgrades similar to the saloon's, while keeping the body style almost untouched. Commercial variants were not upgraded to third series specifications, as during 1959 they were phased out in favour of a forward control full-fledged van using Appia drivetrains, the Lancia Jolly.

Appia commercial vehicles, dimensions and weights
	C80/C80S Furgoncino	C83/C83S Camioncino	C86/C86S Autolettiga
Wheelbase	2,560 mm (100.8 in)	2,660 mm (104.7 in)	2,560 mm (100.8 in)
Length	4,064 mm (160.0 in)	4,370 mm (172.0 in)	4,064 mm (160.0 in)
Width	1,582 mm (62.3 in)	1,620 mm (63.8 in)	1,582 mm (62.3 in)
Height	1,715 mm (67.5 in)	1,650 mm w/o tarp. (65.0 in); 2,020 mm w/ tarp. (79.5 in)	1,715 mm (67.5 in)
Kerb weight	1,080 kg (2,381 lb)	1,150 kg (2,535 lb)	1,220 kg (2,690 lb)
Payload	940 kg (2,072 lb)	1,140 kg (2,513 lb)	—

== Coachbuilt variants ==
First series Appias were only offered in factory body styles. This changed with the second and third series Appias, which were also built as a platform chassis intended for coachbuilt bodies. Towards the end of 1955 a first batch of 14 chassis based on the brand new second series Appia were built and handed over to some of the most prominent coachbuilders of the time: Allemano, Boano, Ghia Aigle, Motto, Pinin Farina, Vignale and Zagato. Initially all fourteen chassis were coded tipo 812.00, based on standard saloon mechanicals; five of were upgraded to a more powerful 53 PS engine and floor-mounted shifter, and given the new type designation 812.01. At the April 1956 Turin Motor Show, a month after the successful introduction of the second series Appia in Geneva, five specially bodied Appias were shown: a coupé and a two-door saloon by Vignale, a coupé each from Pinin Farina, Boano and Zagato. Between Spring 1956 and Spring 1957 the coachbuilders presented their one-off interpretations of the Appia at various motor shows. Later more 812.01 chassis were built, bringing the total of unique to thirteen.

Of the coachbuilders who had worked on the first fourteen chassis, two were selected by Lancia to produce special Appia body styles: Pinin Farina for the coupé, and Vignale for the convertible. Their nearly definitive proposals debuted at the March 1957 Geneva Motor Show, and soon went into limited series production. Built by their respective designers on chassis supplied by Lancia, these were included in Lancia's own catalogue and regularly sold through Lancia dealerships. In the later years other variants were added to the official portfolio: Vignale's Lusso, Zagato's GTE and Sport, and Viotti's Giardinetta. All of these variants were built on the 812.01 type chassis with the more powerful engine and floor shifter; when the third series saloon debuted its mechanical upgrades were transferred to the chassis, and the engine gained one horsepower 54 PS. In early 1960 a revised, more powerful engine was adopted, putting out 60 HP thanks to a new Weber carburettor and an inlet manifold with a duct per each cylinder. In total 5,161 Appia chassis for coachbuilders were made.

Lancia Appia chassis, type codes and models
Type	Prod. number	Series	Application	Notes
812.00	14	2	1956 prototypes	Standard saloon engine, column shifter; 5 converted to 812.01
812.01		2, 3	All series 2 coachbuilt variants, plus some series 3: Coupés, all Convertibiles, Zagato GT/GTS/GTE	Introduced the more powerful engine and the floor shifter. 13 with one-off bodies, 5 of them converted from 812.00
812.02	477	3	Appia Lusso (Vignale)	Strengthened chassis
812.03		3	Appia GTE	Last GTEs built
812.04	730	3	Appia Coupé (Pinin Farina/Viotti)	Last Coupés built
812.05	200	3	Appia Sport (Zagato)	Short wheelbase
808.21	300	3	Appia Giardinetta (Viotti)	Standard saloon engine, column shifter

=== Appia Coupé ===
Lancia Appia Coupé
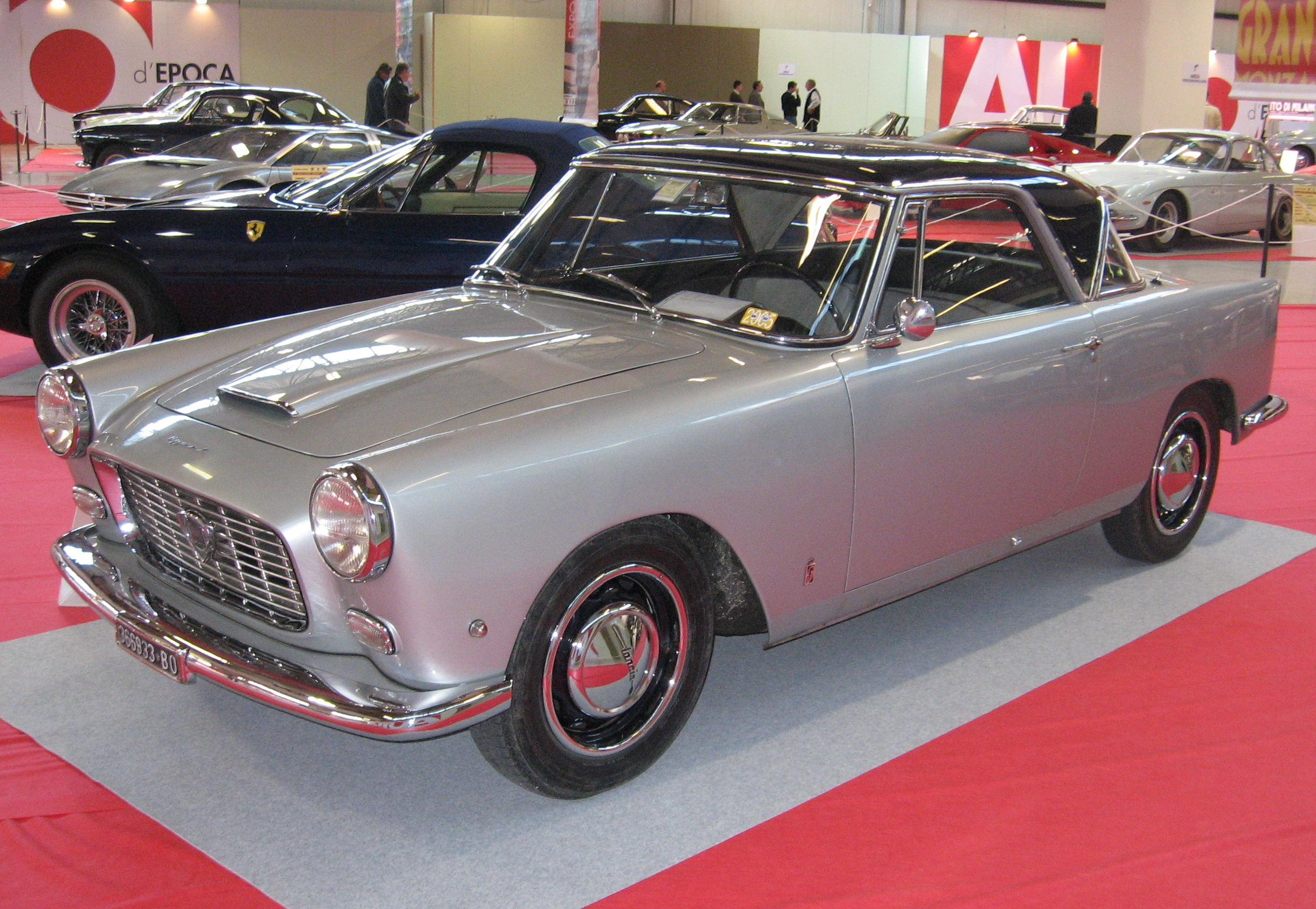

Dimensions
- Wheelbase: 2,510 mm (98.8 in)
- Length: 4,130 mm (162.6 in)
- Width: 1,490 mm (58.7 in)
- Height: 1,310 mm (51.6 in)
- Kerb weight: 925 kg (2,039 lb)

Pinin Farina built a 2+2 coupé version between 1957 and 1963. Pinin Farina's first proposal, from the 1956 Turin Motor Show, was a 4-seater coupé based on an 812.00 chassis and reminiscent of the Lancia Florida prototype, which Lancia's management did not find satisfactory. Therefore, Pinin Farina set off to work on a second prototype, a 2+2 on one of the five more powerful 812.01 chassis, shown with Lancia's blessing at the March 1957 Geneva Motor Show. Shortly after the Motor Show the car went into small series production, christened Appia Coupé. The Coupé was characterised by a wide grille—which previewed Pinin Farina's own Lancia Flaminia as well as the third series Appia berlina, by a V-shaped B-pillar parting the side window from the wrap-around rear window, and by a two-tone paint scheme. The tail lights were trapezoidal element inset in the rear fins. Bodies were steel, with a fibreglass boot lid.

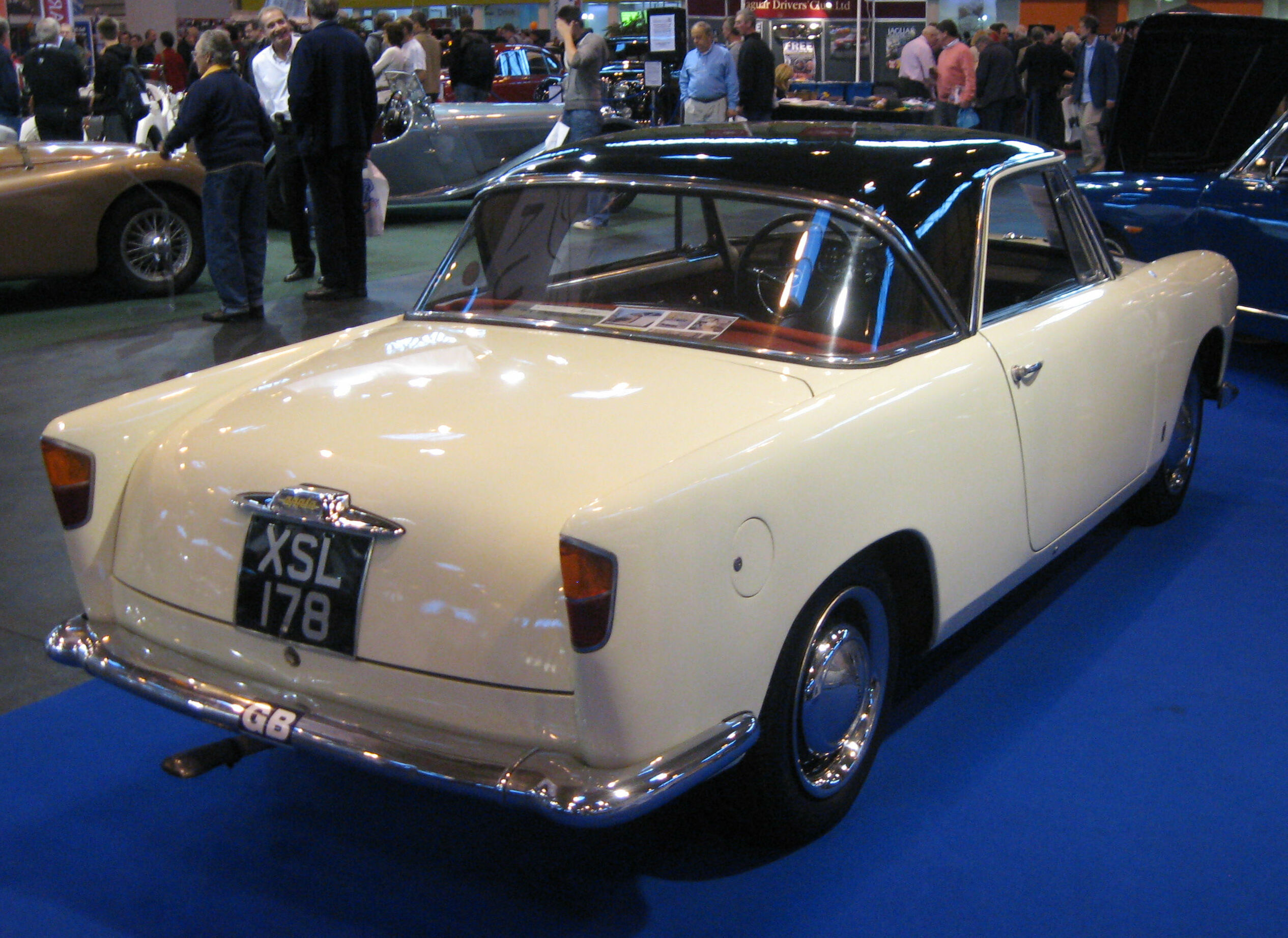
1958 Appia Coupé, showing the first design of tail lights

With the introduction of the third series Appia in 1959 the coupé was updated too, to a slightly stronger 54 engine. Third series coupés can be distinguished by the rear tail lights, grouped in a single unit making up the edge of the rear—more vertical—tail fins. In the spring of 1960 the updated 60 HP engine was adopted. Later in the production run production was moved to Carrozzeria Viotti. Viotti-built cars were identical to Pinin Farina's, although late ones were based on a reinforced 812.04 chassis and had fibreglass instead of aluminium dashboards, and steel instead of fibreglass boot lids. Production amounted to 302 second series cars all built by Pinin Farina, and some 785 third series cars made by Pinin Farina and Viotti. 1,087 cars were built overall, from 1957 to 1963.

=== Appia Convertibile and Lusso ===
Lancia Appia Convertibile and Lusso
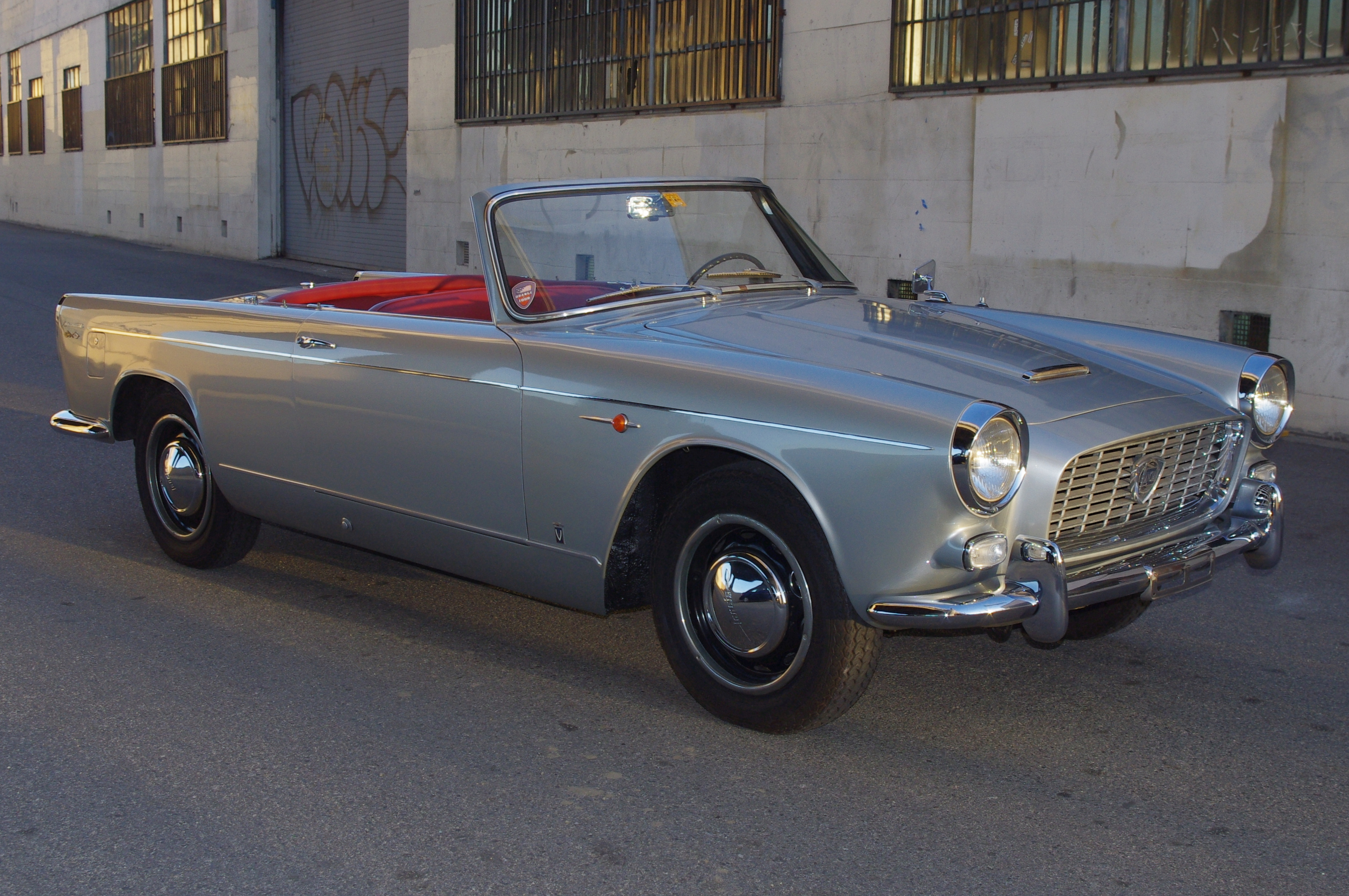
- Lancia Appia Convertibile Vignale

Dimensions
- Wheelbase: 2,510 mm (98.8 in)
- Length: Convertibile: 4,150 mm (163.4 in); Lusso: 4,340 mm (170.9 in)
- Width: Convertibile: 1,510 mm (59.4 in); Lusso: 1,520 mm (59.8 in)
- Height: Convertibile: 1,300 mm (51.2 in); Lusso: 1,395 mm (54.9 in)
- Kerb weight: Convertibile: 920 kg (2,028 lb); Lusso: 930 kg (2,050 lb)

Vignale's creations from the 1956 Turin Motor Show — on two of the eight 812.00 chassis built — were a coupé named Appia Sport, reminiscent of Vignale's own Lancia Aurelia "Raggio Azzurro", and the Gran Lusso, an elegant 2-door saloon.

Vignale was then chosen to build a cabriolet version of the Appia. The Lancia Appia Convertibile, designed by Giovanni Michelotti, was introduced at the 1957 Turin Motor Show and produced up to 1962. Initially a two-seater, it was later revised to accept two rear occasional seats, thus becoming a 2+2 from the summer of 1968. All Convertibles were built on an 812.01 chassis; at first based on the second series Appia platform with a 53 PS engine, upgraded in 1959 to the third series platform and 54 PS engine, and finally in 1960 to the more powerful 60 PS engine. From 1957 to 1962, 1,584 convertibles were built.

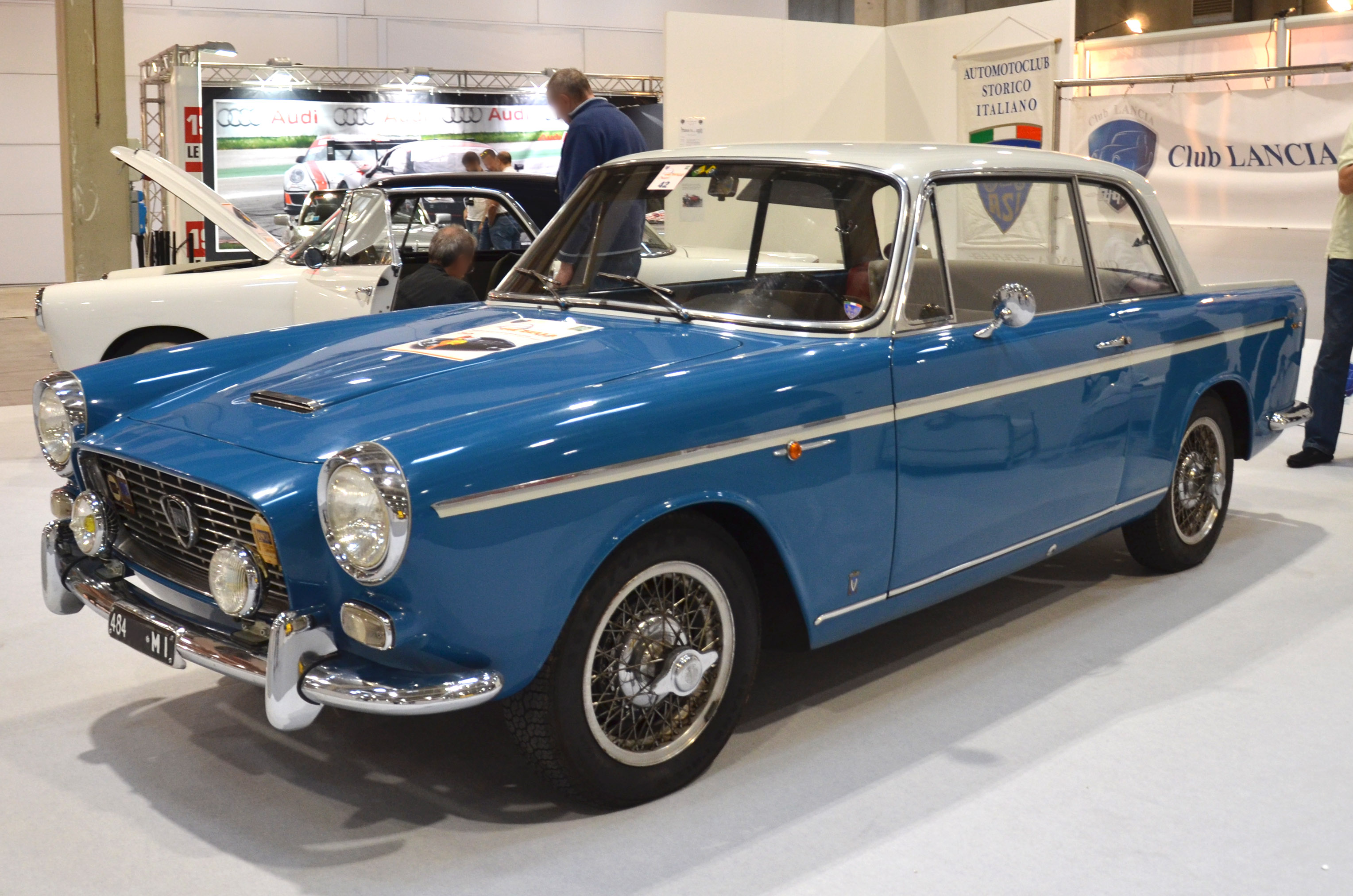
Lancia Appia Lusso Vignale

At the 1958 Turin Motor Show, Vignale introduced another special Appia variant, the Lancia Appia Lusso or Berlina Lusso. This was a two-door saloon with frameless doors and ample windows, again with styling by Michelotti derived from the 1956 Lancia Gran Lusso. All Vignale Lusso were built on a specific version of the Tipo 812.02 chassis, a strengthened series three platform. Front wings and bonnet were shared with the Convertibile, but the Lusso was longer, larger and taller. In total 477 Appia Lusso were made in the Vignale factory from 1959 to 1962.

=== Appia Zagato ===
Zagato built four coupé versions based on the Berlina between 1957 and 1962, for a grand total of 721 vehicles. Zagato's creations catered to Lancia's sportiest clientele, who would privately race their cars. All of Zagato's Appias were bodied stretching an aluminium skin over a boxed steel framework.

==== Appia Cammello and prototypes ====
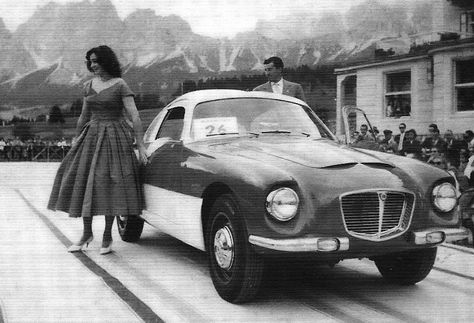
Cammello, 1956

The harbinger of all Zagato Appias was the prototype built on a type 812.01 chassis, serial number 1005, and first displayed at the 1956 Turin Motor Show. It was immediately nicknamed Appia Cammello, "Camel", because of the double humps it carried not only on the roof—Zagato's signature double bubble—but also on the engine bonnet and boot lid. Originally painted in two-tone blue and white, and fully finished with bumpers and over-riders, this prototype was victorious at that year's Cortina concours d'elegance. Later it was outfitted for racing—applying an amaranto (dark red) livery, removing the bumpers and fitting more conventional looking bonnet and boot lid—and entered at the 1957 Mille Miglia.

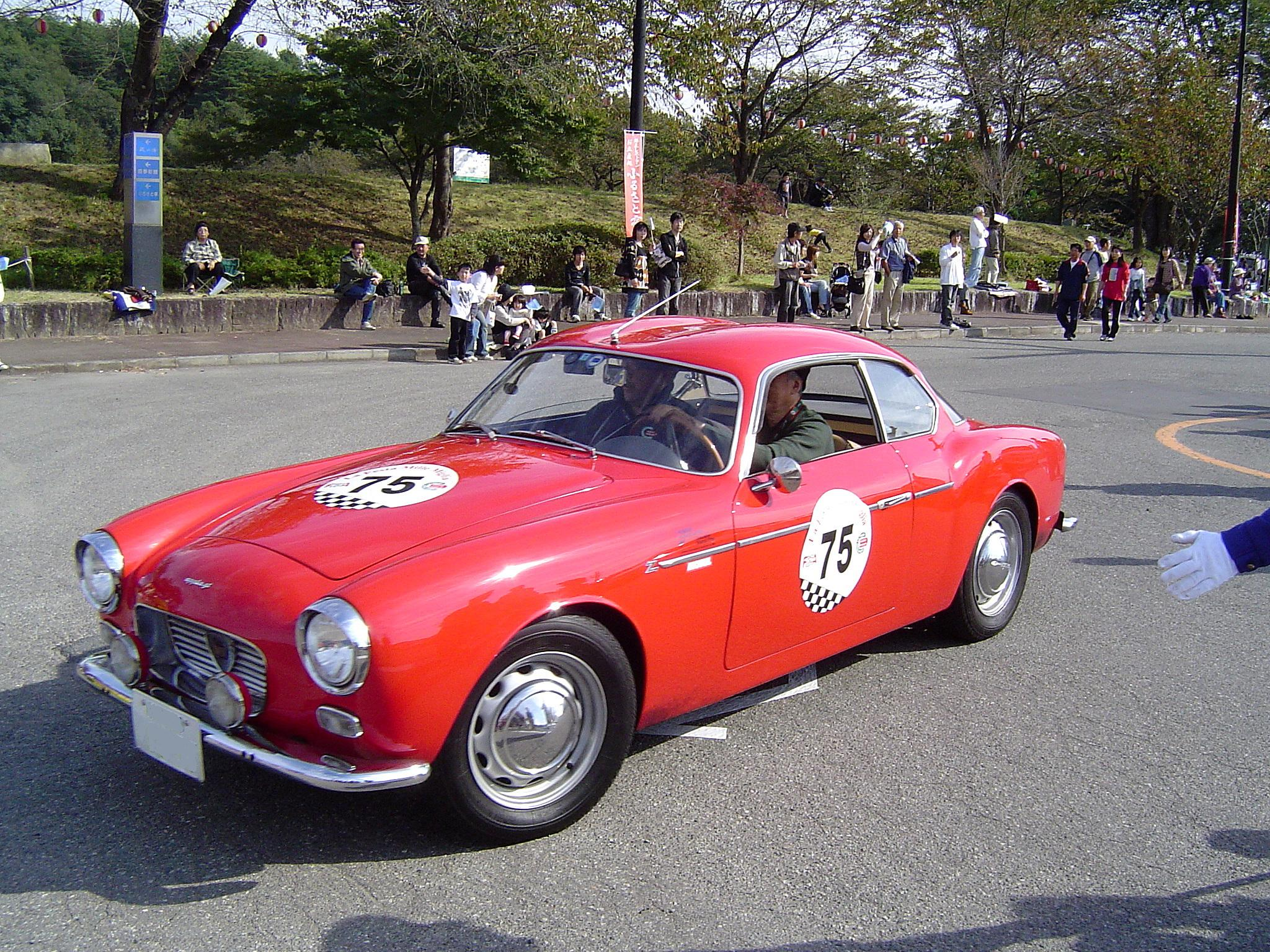
Lancia Appia GT Zagato

==== Appia GT and GTS ====
During early 1957, Zagato built some 30 more Appias, which remained somewhat similar to the first Cammello, but lost the humps on the bonnet and boot lid, donned thin vertical fins over the rear wings and Plexiglas-covered headlamps, and gained a new grille which would set the template for all future Appia Zagato. All these cars differed a lot from one another. After this first run of prototypes two models were more or less standardised and built in roughly 150 examples. These were the Appia GT, with open headlights carried over from the saloon, and the same 53 PS engine found on other coachbuilders' models; and the sportier Appia GTS, with faired in headlights, a more streamlined body, often a double bubble roof, and a tuned 60 PS engine. The interior carried over the standard car's steering wheel but added tube-framed leatherette sport seats; on the GTS a wood-rimmed steering wheel and bucket seats were optional.

At the 1957 Mille Miglia three Zagato Appias scored a remarkable 1-2-3 finish in their class: the winner was Luciano Mantovani on a GTS, runner up Enrico Anselmi on another GTS, third the aforementioned Cammello piloted by Giorgio Lurani.

==== Appia GTE ====
Lancia Appia GTE
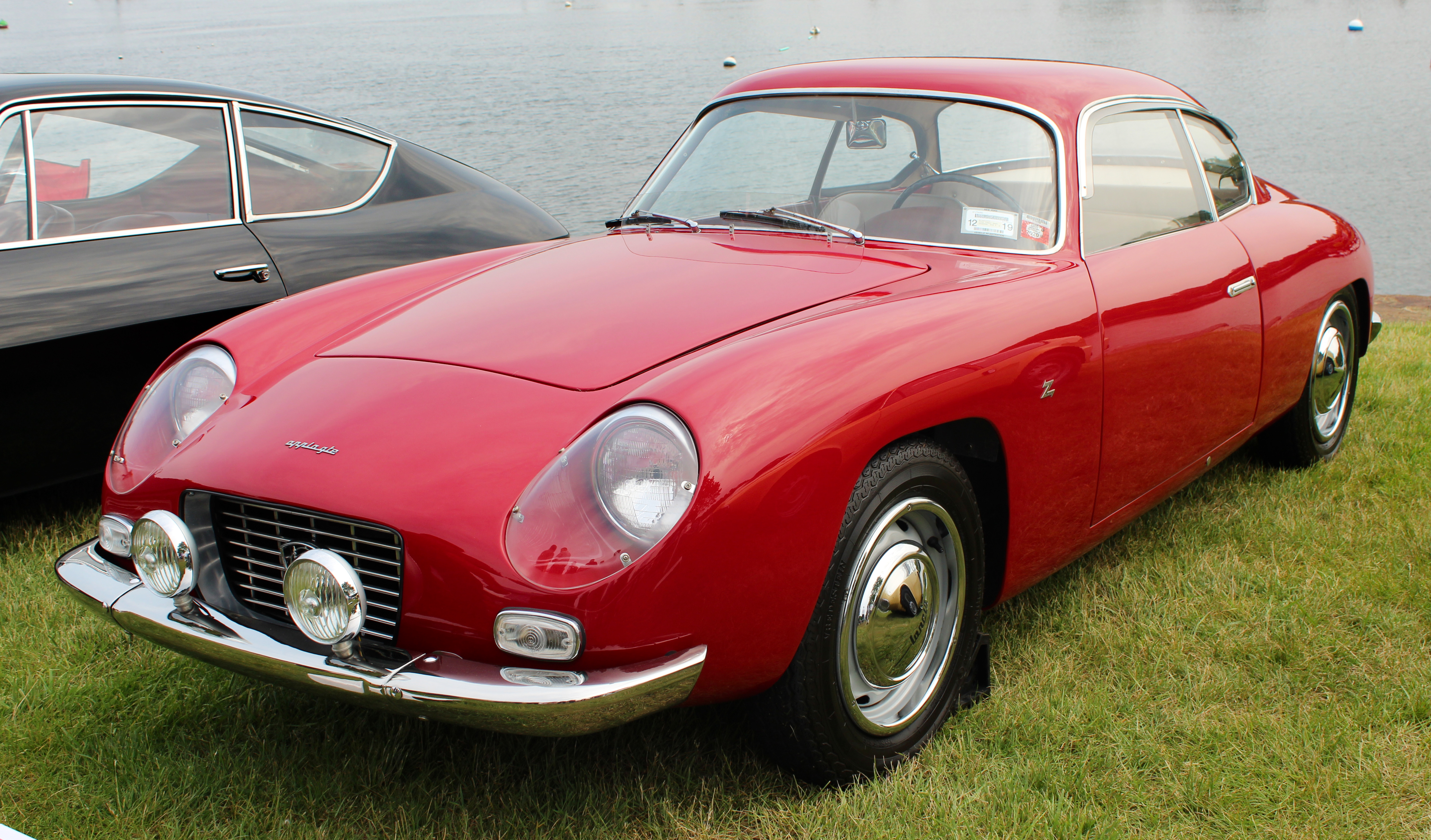

Dimensions
- Wheelbase: 2,510 mm (98.8 in)
- Length: 4,190 mm (165.0 in)
- Width: 1,420 mm (55.9 in)
- Height: 1,240 mm (48.8 in)
- Kerb weight: 820 kg (1,808 lb)

At the November 1958 Turin Motor Show, the new Lancia Appia GTE (standing for Gran Turismo Esportazione) was introduced, with deliveries starting in January 1959. The GTE marked an important change in the relationship between Zagato and Lancia: it was the first Zagato car to be included in Lancia's price lists and sold by Lancia dealers. For Lancia Zagato went from a buyer of chassis to an official supplier of specially bodied finished cars. First shown to the public at the 1958 Turin Motor Show, the first GTEs were delivered in early 1959. GTE bodywork was more low slung and streamlined than its predecessors'. The car had a continuous waistline, without the previous humps over the rear wheels; the nose was longer, and the under elongated Plexiglas covers the headlights were set deeply into the wings. At the rear the tail lights were partially sunken in and crowned by protrusions in the bodywork.

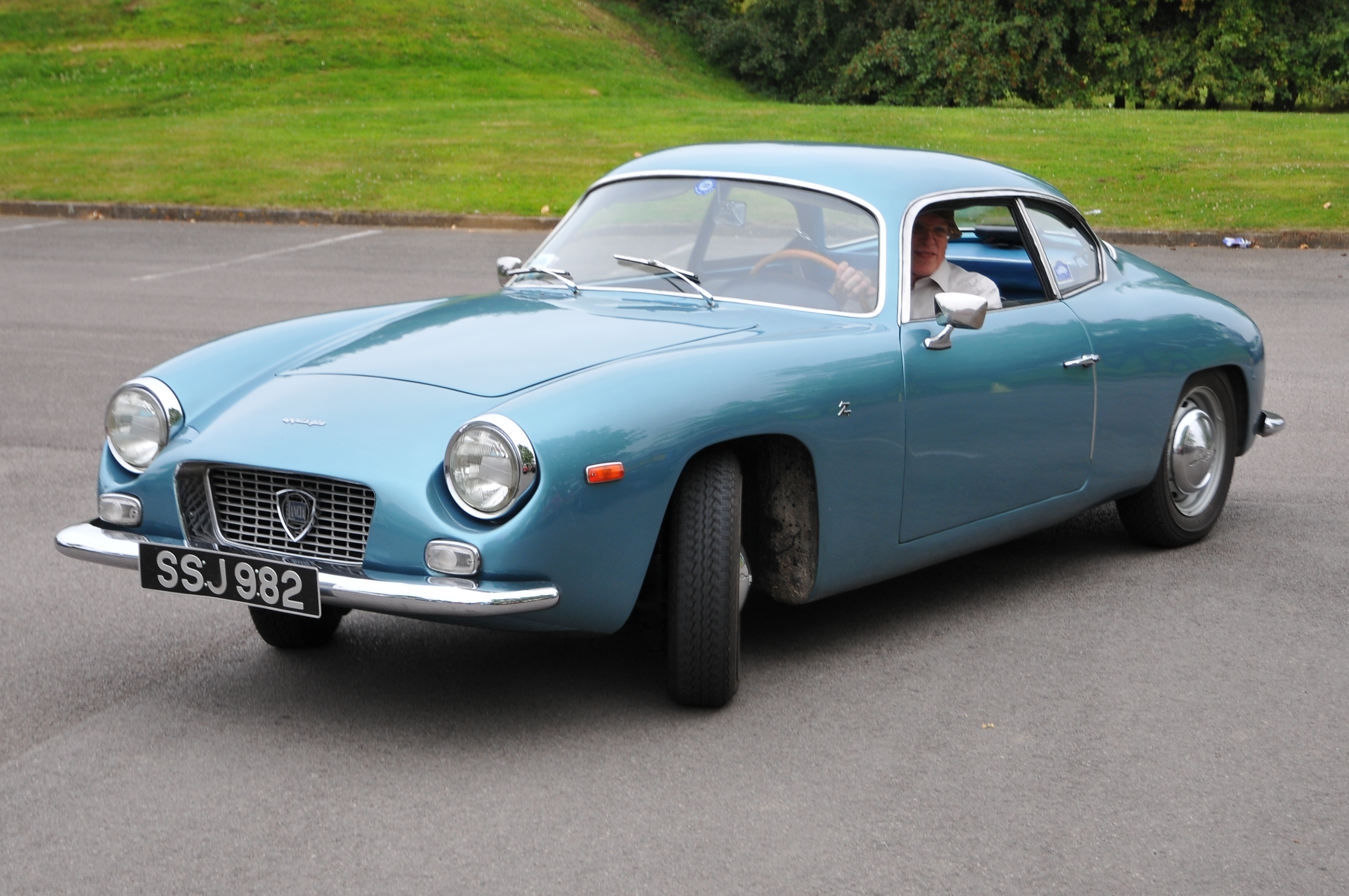
Late open headlight Appia GTE

The GTE went through numerous updates. In the Spring 1959 chassis upgraded to third series specifications were phased in. From the autumn newly enacted Italian traffic laws prohibited headlights cover. GTEs for Italy and some export countries had open headlights, and modified bodywork setting them further forward. During 1960 the improved 60 PS engine was adopted. When the Appia Sport was introduced it did not supersede the GTE, but rather some of its features were carried over, such as new headlights and protruding in place of flush pushbutton door handles. The last GTEs were built on a specific 812.03 chassis; the very last example was completed in April 1962. It is estimated that total GTE production amounts to 167 with the earlier 53 PS engine, and 134 with the later 60 PS one.

==== Appia Sport ====
Lancia Appia Sport
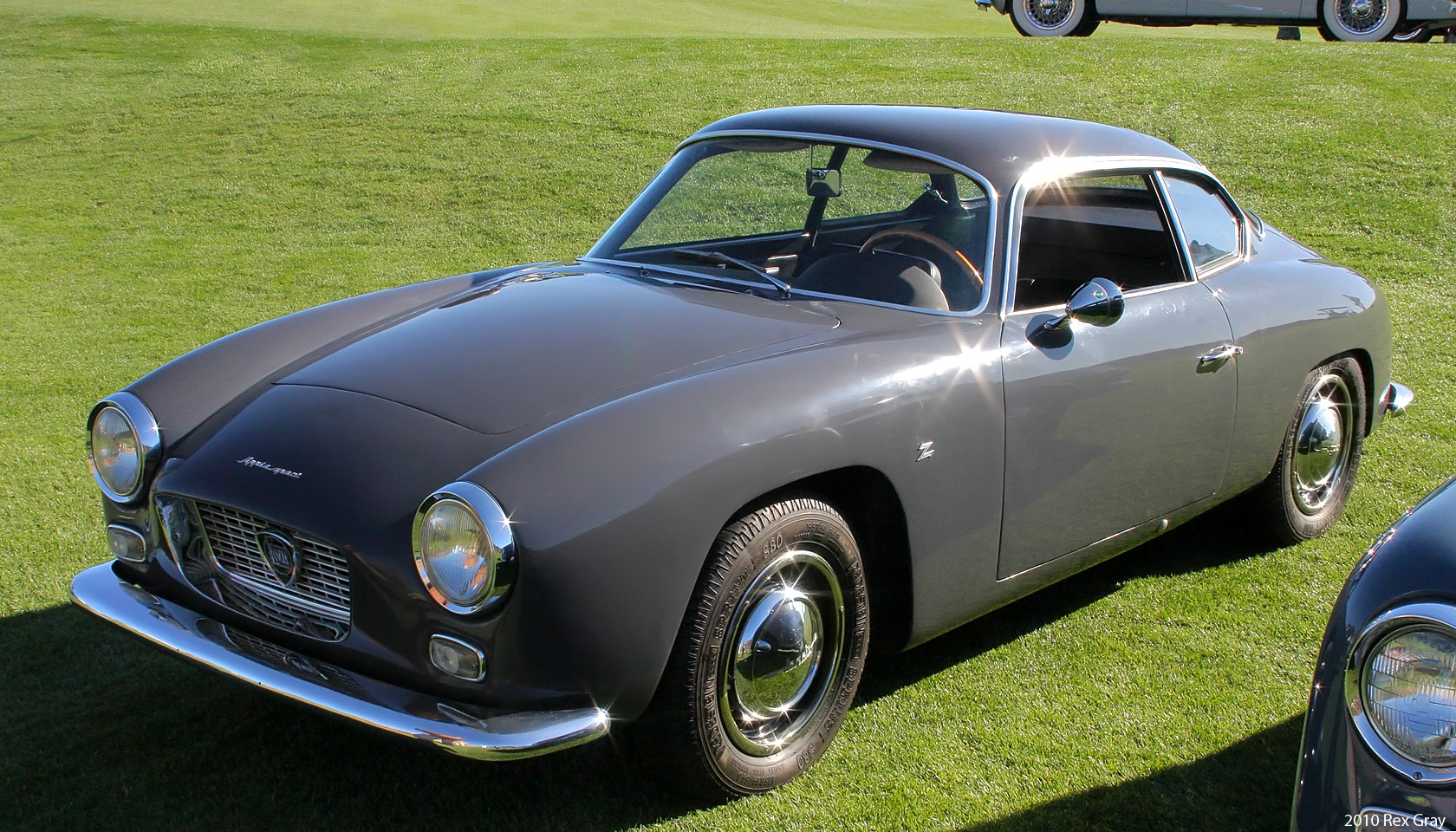
- 1961 Lancia Appia Sport

Dimensions
- Wheelbase: 2,350 mm (92.5 in)
- Length: 3,990 mm (157.1 in)
- Width: 1,410 mm (55.5 in)
- Height: 1,230 mm (48.4 in)
- Kerb weight: 820 kg (1,808 lb)

The last and ultimate of Zagato's Appias was the Appia Sport, built from 1961 to 1963 on a short wheelbase chassis coded 812.05. The Sport's premiere took place at the March 1961 Geneva Motor Show, and production began concurrently; it did not replace the standard wheelbase GTE, which remained on sale alongside it up to 1962. At 2,350 mm (92.5 in) the Sport's wheelbase was 160 mm (6.3 in) shorter than the GTE's, resulting in a 200 mm (7.9 in) shorter overall length. Adapting the GTE bodywork to the smaller dimensions was the first job of a young Ercole Spada, just hired at Zagato. From the front the Sport was similar to an open headlight GTE, but had a much rounder rear end, tail lights fully sunken into the bodywork, and a fastback roofline. The Sport is the only Appia Zagato for which production numbers are certain, as the coachbuilder started keeping detailed registers of its production only in 1960: production began in March 1961 concurrently to the model launch, with chassis #1001, and ended in January 1963 with chassis #1201, the 200th car. It is also the most standardised of all Zagato Appias, though differences in exterior and interior trim from one car to another were still present, depending on part availability at the time and on the client's desires.

A Lancia Appia Zagato was raced in the 1959 12 Hours of Sebring, among the drivers was newsman Walter Cronkite.

=== Appia Giardinetta ===
Lancia Appia Giardinetta

Dimensions
- Wheelbase: 2,510 mm (98.8 in)
- Length: 4,075 mm (160.4 in)
- Width: 1,540 mm (60.6 in)
- Height: 1,485 mm (58.5 in)
- Kerb weight: 1,030 kg (2,271 lb)

Towards the end of 1958, Lancia turned to Carrozzeria Viotti to build a 3-door estate based on the third series Appia. Named Appia Giardinetta—Viotti's trademark designation for estate cars—the production version was unveiled at the November 1959 Turin Motor Show. Chassis was extensively modified, receiving a new 808.21 type code: a three-door layout was chosen, adding a centre pillar (the Appia saloon had none) to strengthen the body, and the rear part of the platform was altered to lower the boot opening. Despite looking very similar, little more than lamps and interior details were carried over from the saloon's bodywork. The body was widened 6 cm (2.4 in), which in turn required a wider dashboard, new bumpers, grille, and windscreen. Inside leatherette and rubber mats took place of Lancia's traditional wool cloth and carpets; the rear seats folded down forming a completely flat 1.5 m-long (4 ft 11 in) loading area. The complexity of this development and lack of economies of scale reflected on the list price, which was approximately 25% higher than the saloon's. Due to the additional weight, the manufacturer's claimed top speed for the Giardinetta was down to 120 km/h (75 mph). In total just 300 Giardinettas were made.

== Specifications ==
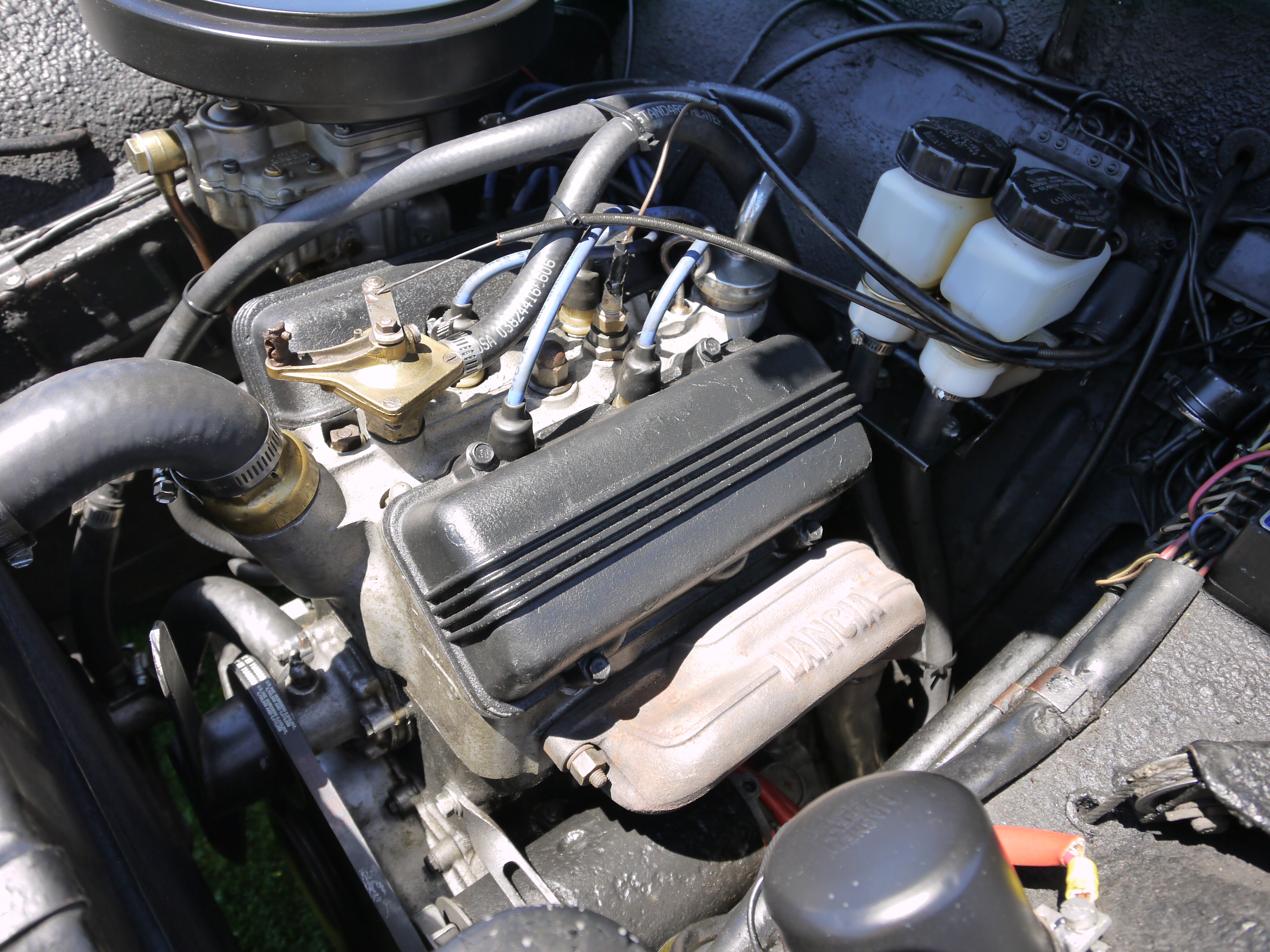
Lancia V4 engine in an Appia Convertibile

=== Body and chassis ===
The Appia Berlina used unibody construction. Front suspension was of Lancia's sliding pillar type, with hydraulic dampers. At the rear there was a solid axle on leaf springs, with hydraulic dampers; the axle had an aluminium differential housing and a stamped steel structure. All Appias were equipped with hydraulic brakes, and drums an all four wheels. Series three cars gained a dual braking circuit and twin leading shoe, finned aluminium front drums with cast iron wear rings; the rears remained solid cast iron. When leaving the factory they would originally fit Pirelli Cinturato 155HR15 tyres (CA67).

=== Engine and transmission ===
The Appia had a V4 engine with a 10.14° angle between the cylinder banks and a single head for all four cylinders. All models had a bore and stroke of 68 mm × 75 mm (2.7 in × 3.0 in), for a total displacement of 1,089 cc (66.5 cu in). The valvetrain comprised two angled poppet valves per cylinder, actuated by pushrods and rocker arms; there were two in-block camshafts, the left hand one for all exhaust and the right hand one for all intake valves, driven by a chain with hydraulic tensioner. The cylinder heads were aluminium, as were crankcase and oil pan, integrated in a single casting; the cylinder block was cast iron.

Lancia Appia engines
Series	Model	Prod. years	Engine	Compr. ratio	Power	Torque	Carburettor
S. 1	Berlina	1953–56	V4 OHV; 1,089 cc	7.4:1	38 PS (28 kW; 37 hp)	71 N⋅m (52 lb⋅ft) at 3,000 rpm	Solex 32/30 BI single-choke
S. 1	Commercial	1954–56	V4 OHV; 1,089 cc		33 PS (24 kW; 33 hp)		Solex 32/30 BI single-choke
S. 2	Berlina	1956–59	V4 OHV; 1,089 cc	7.2:1	43.5 PS (32.0 kW; 42.9 hp)	76 N⋅m (56 lb⋅ft) at 3,000 rpm	Solex C32 PBIC single-choke
S. 2	Chassis	1956–59	V4 OHV; 1,089 cc	8.0:1	53 PS (39 kW; 52 hp)	86 N⋅m (63 lb⋅ft) at 3,500 rpm	Weber 36 DCLD 3 twin-choke
S. 2	Commercial	1956–59	V4 OHV; 1,089 cc	7.2:1	36.5 PS (26.8 kW; 36.0 hp) at 4,500 rpm	76 N⋅m (56 lb⋅ft) at 2,000 rpm	Solex 32/30 BI single-choke
S. 3	Berlina	1959–63	V4 OHV; 1,089 cc	7.8:1	48 PS (35 kW; 47 hp) at 4,900 rpm	85 N⋅m (63 lb⋅ft) at 3,200 rpm	Solex C32 PBIC single-choke
S. 3	Chassis	1959–60	V4 OHV; 1,089 cc	8.0:1	54 PS (40 kW; 53 hp) at 4,900 rpm	87 N⋅m (64 lb⋅ft) at 3,500 rpm	Weber 36 DCLD 3 twin-choke
S. 3	Chassis	1960–63	V4 OHV; 1,089 cc	8.8:1	60 PS (44 kW; 59 hp) at 4,900 rpm	85 N⋅m (63 lb⋅ft) at 3,500 rpm	Weber 36 DCD 5 twin-choke

The transmission was a four-speed gearbox, the top three synchronised. The clutch was dry single plate, mechanically actuated.

=== Performance ===
An S1 Berlina saloon tested by the British The Motor magazine in 1954 had a top speed of 76.1 mph (122.5 km/h) and could accelerate from 0–60 mph (97 km/h) in 32.5 seconds. A fuel consumption of 29.0 miles per imperial gallon (9.7 L/100 km; 24.1 mpg_{‑US}) was recorded. The car was not at the time available on the UK market but an Italian price of 1,328,600 Lire was reported (converted to £780).

== Production numbers ==
Lancia Appia, production by year
Type	1953	1954	1955	1956	1957	1958	1959	1960	1961	1962	1963	Total
Appia Berlina^{[α]}	5,286	10,215	4,497	5,334	8,357	7,982	10,101	17,066	13,860	12,250	3,052	98,000
Chassis for coachbuilders^{[β]}	—	—	—	29	834	681	890	1,307	692	411	17	4,861
Appia Giardinetta^{[γ]}	—	—	—	—	—	—	31	269	—	—	—	300
Commercial variants^{[δ]}	—	693	1,079	546	712	671	162	—	—	—	—	3,863
Grand total												107,024

Notes

- ^{α} includes types C10, C10S, 808.07, 808.08
- ^{β} includes types 812.00, 812.01, 812.02, 812.03, 812.04, 812.05
- ^{γ} includes type 808.21
- ^{δ} includes types C80, C80S, C83, C83S, C86, C86S
