= Lancia V4 engine =

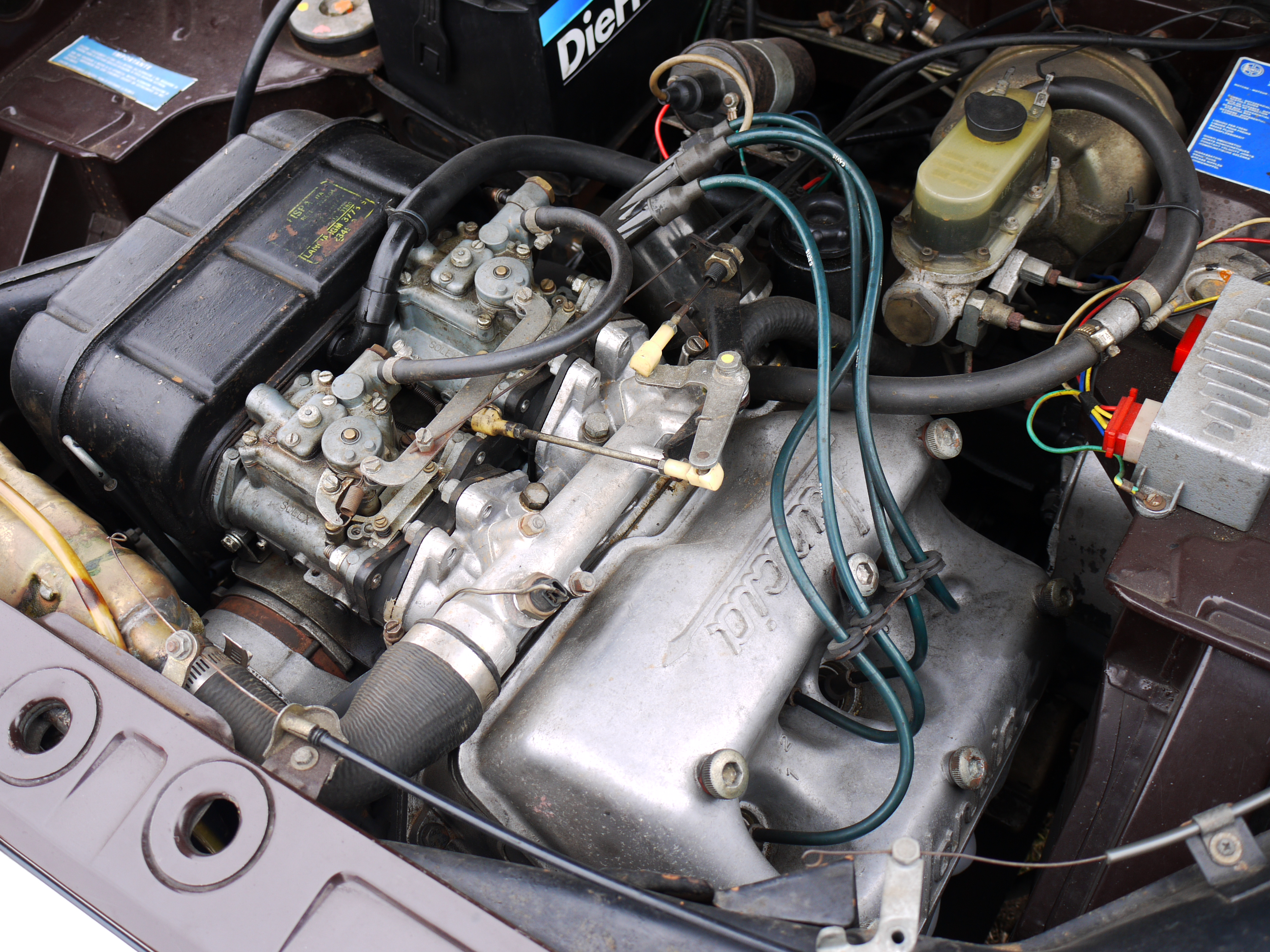
- In Lancia's Fulvia model, the 1.3 litre V4 engine was mounted at a 45° angle.

Overview
- Manufacturer: Lancia
- Production: 1922-1976

Layout
- Configuration: All V4s at: 10°, 11°, 13°, 20°
- Displacement: 903 cc (55.1 cu in); 1,090 cc (67 cu in); 1,091 cc (66.6 cu in); 1,196 cc (73.0 cu in); 1,199 cc (73.2 cu in); 1,216 cc (74.2 cu in); 1,231 cc (75.1 cu in); 1,298 cc (79.2 cu in); 1,352 cc (82.5 cu in); 1,486 cc (90.7 cu in); 1,584 cc (96.7 cu in); 1,927 cc (117.6 cu in); 2,119 cc (129.3 cu in); 2,370 cc (145 cu in); 2,568 cc (156.7 cu in)
- Cylinder bore: 65 mm (2.56 in); 69.85 mm (2.75 in); 72 mm (2.83 in); 74.61 mm (2.94 in); 75 mm (2.95 in); 78 mm (3.07 in); 79.37 mm (3.12 in); 82 mm (3.23 in); 82.55 mm (3.25 in)
- Piston stroke: 67 mm (2.64 in); 68 mm (2.68 in); 69.7 mm (2.74 in); 75 mm (2.95 in); 78 mm (3.07 in); 82 mm (3.23 in); 85 mm (3.35 in); 90 mm (3.54 in); 120 mm (4.72 in)
- Cylinder head material: Aluminum
- Valvetrain: SOHC or DOHC
- Compression ratio: 9.0:1

Combustion
- Fuel system: Carburetor
- Fuel type: Gasoline
- Oil system: Wet sump
- Cooling system: Water-cooled

Output
- Power output: 28.8–132 PS (21–97 kW)

Chronology
- Successor: Lancia Flat-4 engine

Italian automobile company Lancia was the first to manufacture cars with V4 and V6 engines in series-production. This started with a number of V4-engine families, that were produced from the 1920s through 1970s.

The Lancia V4 pioneered the narrow-angle V engine design, more recently seen in Volkswagen's VR5 and VR6 engines which VW called a shortened inline engine. By using very shallow V-angles — between 10° and 20° — both rows of cylinders could be housed in an engine block with a single cylinder head, like a straight engine. A determining characteristic was the use of overhead camshafts (either single or double), in which a camshaft would serve the same function for all cylinders — in both cylinder banks.

== Lambda ==
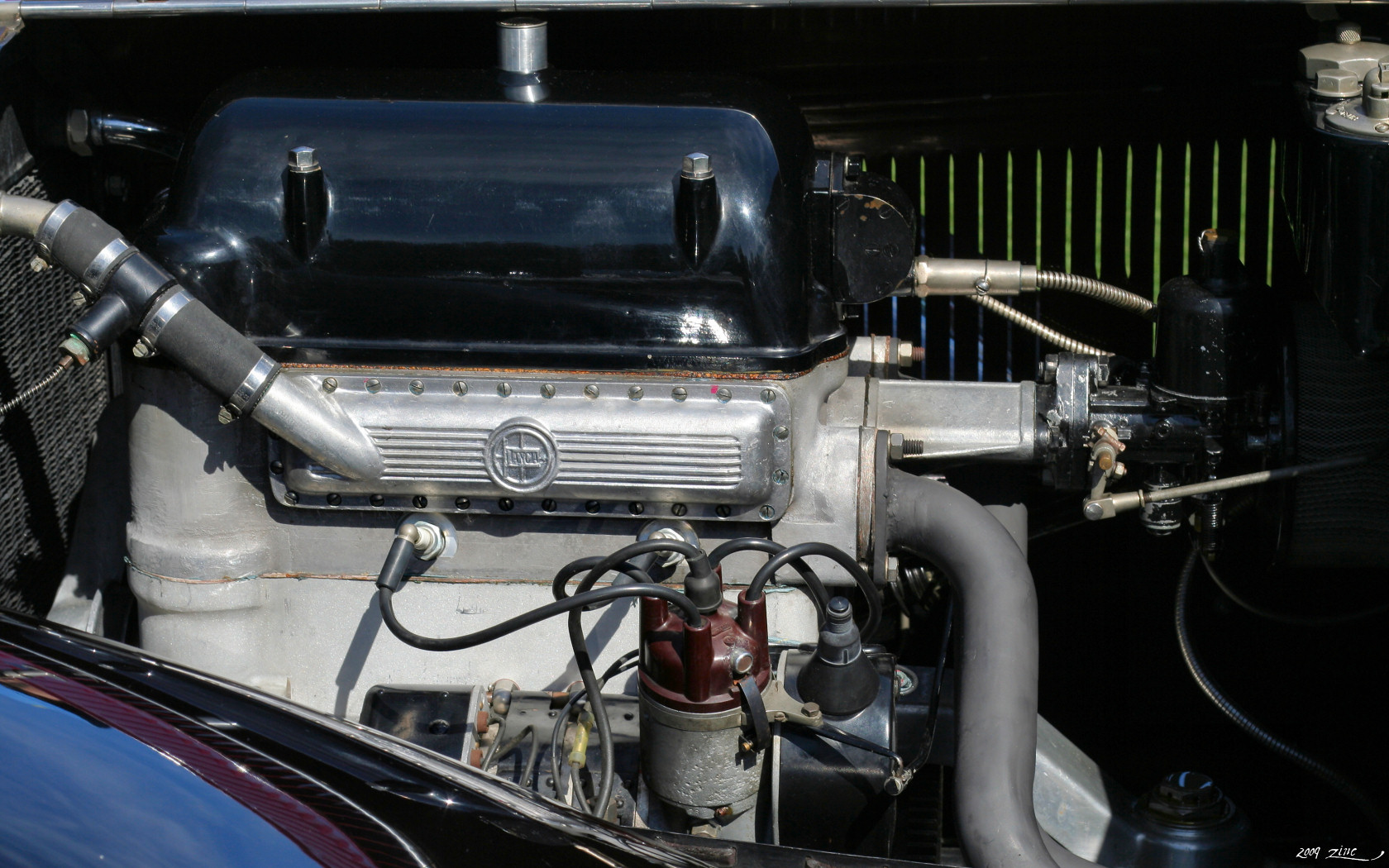
Lancia Lambda V4 engine

The first V4 was used in the Lambda from 1922 through 1931. It was a 20° narrow-angle aluminium design. All three engine displacements shared the same long 120 mm (4.72 in) stroke, and all were SOHC designs with a single camshaft serving both banks of cylinders.

Engines:

- 2.1 L (2,119 cc) 75 mm (2.95 in), 49 PS (36 kW; 48 hp) at 3250 rpm
- 2.4 L (2,370 cc) 79.37 mm (3.12 in), 59 PS (43 kW; 58 hp) at 3250 rpm
- 2.6 L (2,568 cc) 82.55 mm (3.25 in), 69 PS (51 kW; 68 hp) at 3500 rpm

== Artena ==
The Lambda engine was updated for the Artena. Bore was set at 82.55 mm (3.25 in) as in the 2.6 L Lambda, but stroke was reduced to a more conventional 90 mm (3.54 in). Total displacement was 1.9 L (1,927 cc), with 55 PS (40 kW; 54 hp) produced at 4000 rpm.

== Augusta ==
An all-new V4 was designed for the Augusta. Produced from 1934 through 1938, the Augusta's engine displaced 1.2 L (1,196 cc) with a 69.85 mm × 78 mm (2.75 in × 3.07 in) bore and stroke. Power output was 35 PS (26 kW; 35 hp) at 4000 rpm.

== Aprilia ==
The engine was redesigned again for 1936's Aprilia. The first-series cars used a 1.4 L (1,352 cc) version with a 72 mm × 82 mm (2.83 in × 3.23 in) bore and stroke. Output was 47 PS (35 kW; 46 hp) at 4300 rpm.

A second series was unveiled for 1939 with an enlarged 1.5 L (1,486 cc) engine. It did not share its predecessor's dimensions, with bore and stroke now at 74.61 mm × 85 mm (2.94 in × 3.35 in). Power output was nearly the same at 48 PS (35 kW; 47 hp).

== Ardea ==
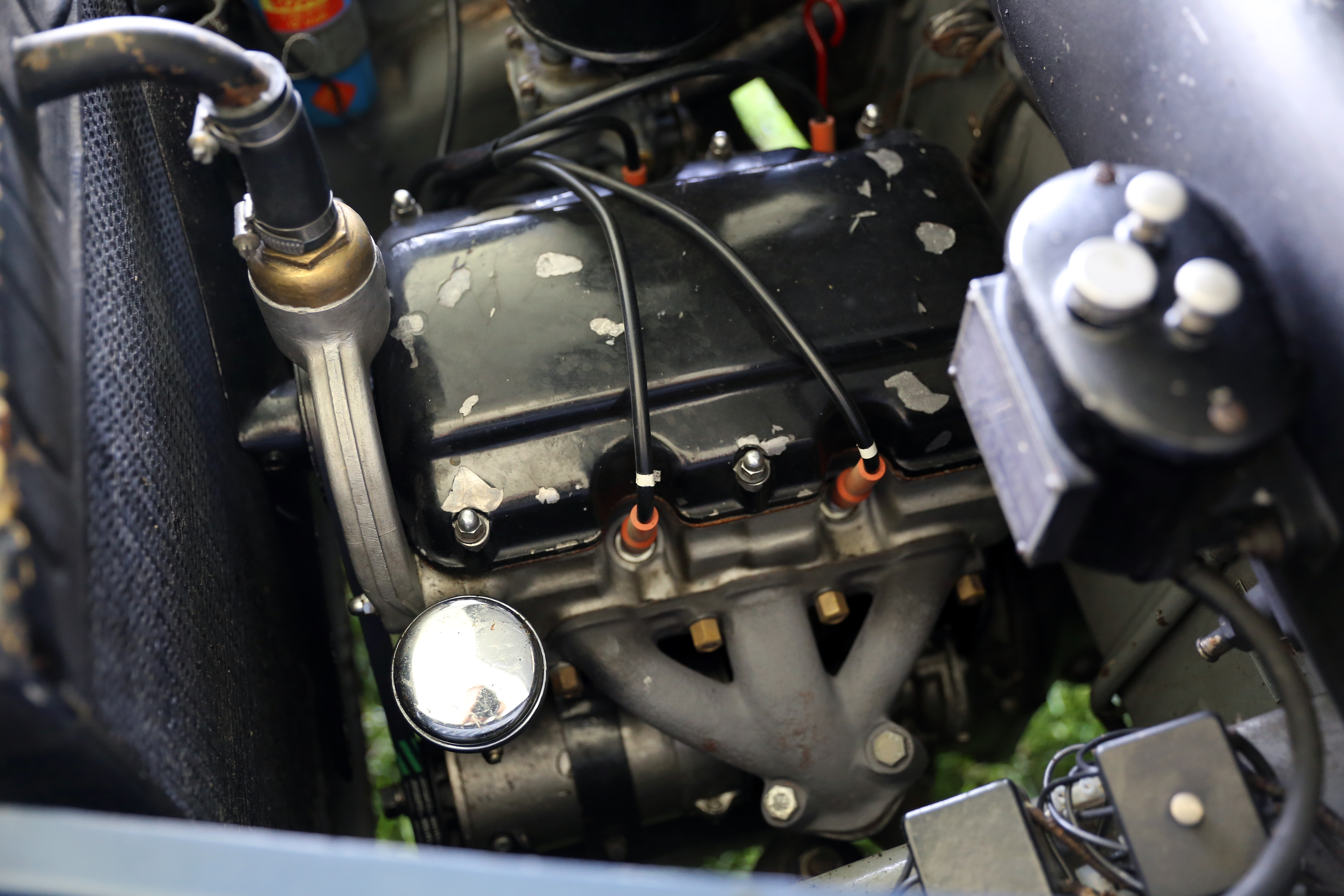
Tipo 100B engine in a 1952 Ardea

A small V4 (tipo 100) powered the compact 1939 Ardea. It was a 20° narrow-angle engine displacing just 0.9 L (903 cc). Bore and stroke were new again at 65 mm × 68 mm (2.56 in × 2.68 in), and output was just 28.8 PS (21.2 kW; 28.4 hp) at 4600 rpm. For the 1949 tipo 100B power was increased to 30 PS (22 kW; 30 hp).

== Appia ==
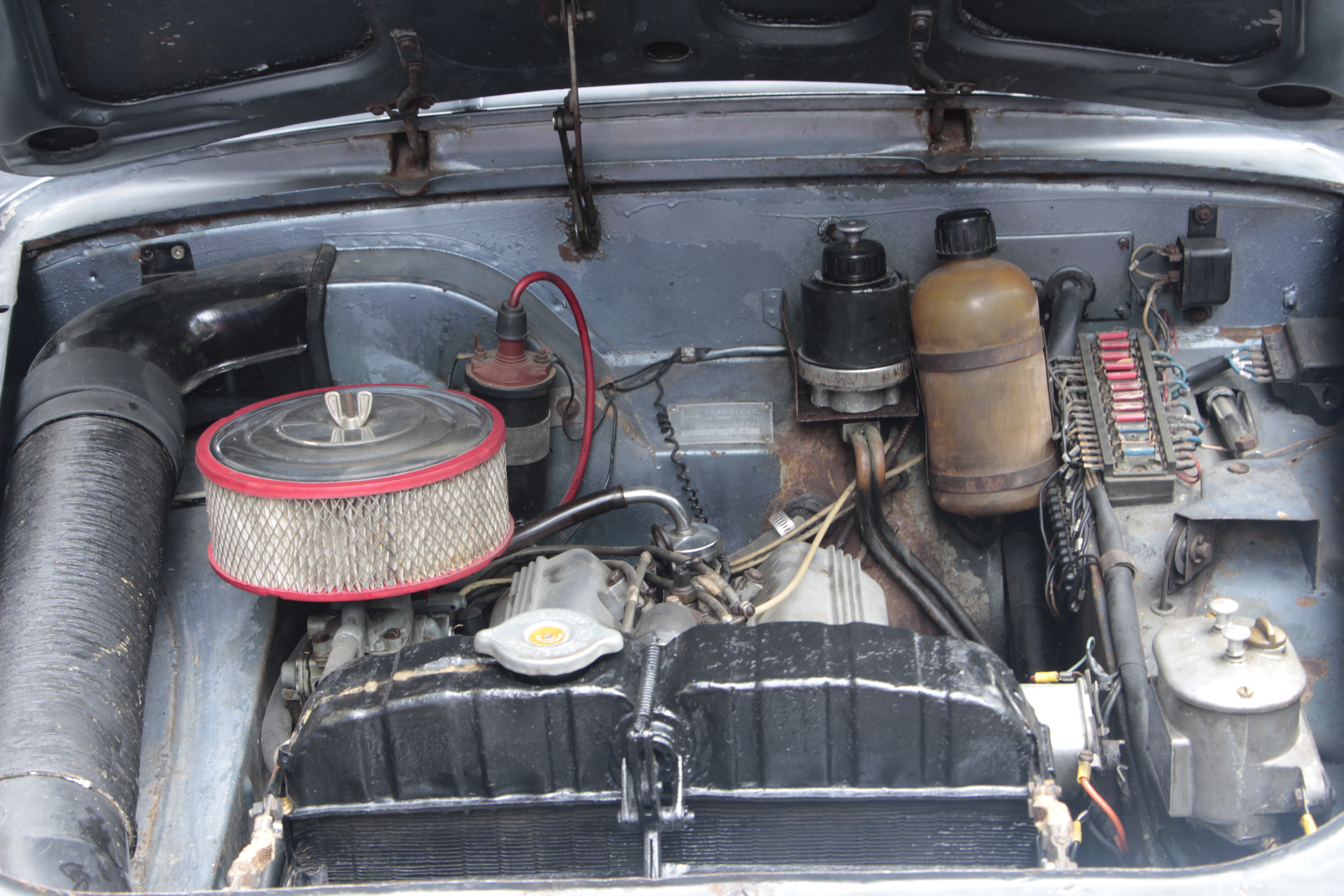
Lancia V4 in a third series Appia Berlina

The V4 returned after the war with the 1953 Appia. It featured an even narrower 10° cylinder bank and just 1.1 L (1,090 cc) of displacement, fitting below Italy's 1.1-liter tax threshold. An initial 38 PS (28 kW; 37 hp) of power grew to 43 PS (32 kW; 42 hp) in 1956. 48 PS (35 kW; 47 hp) was available in 1959.

== Fulvia ==
Lancia's final V4 series were used in the Fulvia, remaining in production up until 1976. Designed by Ettore Zaccone Mina, it used a narrow angle (13°) and was mounted well forward at a 45° angle. The engine was a true DOHC design with one camshaft operating all intake valves and another operating all exhaust valves.

Displacement began at just 1.1 L (1,091 cc) with 59 PS (43 kW; 58 hp) with a 72 mm × 67 mm (2.83 in × 2.64 in) bore and stroke. A higher (9.0:1) compression ratio raised power to 71 PS (52 kW; 70 hp) soon after.

The engine was bored to 76 mm (2.99 in) to enlarge engine displacement to 1.2 L (1,216 cc) for the Coupé model. This, and some tuning, raised output to 80 PS (59 kW; 79 hp), further enhanced up to 88 PS (65 kW; 87 hp) for the HF model.

The engine was re-engineered with a slightly narrower bank angle and longer 69.7 mm (2.74 in) stroke for 1967. Three displacements were produced: 1.2 L (1,199 cc) 74 mm (2.91 in) bore, 1.2 L (1,231 cc) 75 mm (2.95 in) bore, and 1.3 L (1,298 cc) 77 mm (3.03 in) bore. The latter engine is most common, with the first unit only sold in Greece. Three levels of performance were available: 87 PS (64 kW; 86 hp) for common 1.3 Liter (commonly imported in USA and described as "highly tuned" by Road & Track at the time); 90 PS (66 kW; 89 hp) for its 1.3s evolution and 101 PS (74 kW; 100 hp) for the Rallye HF.

The engine was redone again for a new HF with an even narrower 11° cylinder bank and longer 75 mm (2.95 in) stroke for its final incarnation. A bore of 82 mm (3.23 in) gave it a displacement of 1.6 L (1,584 cc), and power shot up to between 114 and 132 PS (84 and 97 kW; 112 and 130 hp) depending on tune.

== See also ==
- Volkswagen VR6 engine, for a more technically detailed article about narrow-angle V-engines
