= Lancia Ardea =

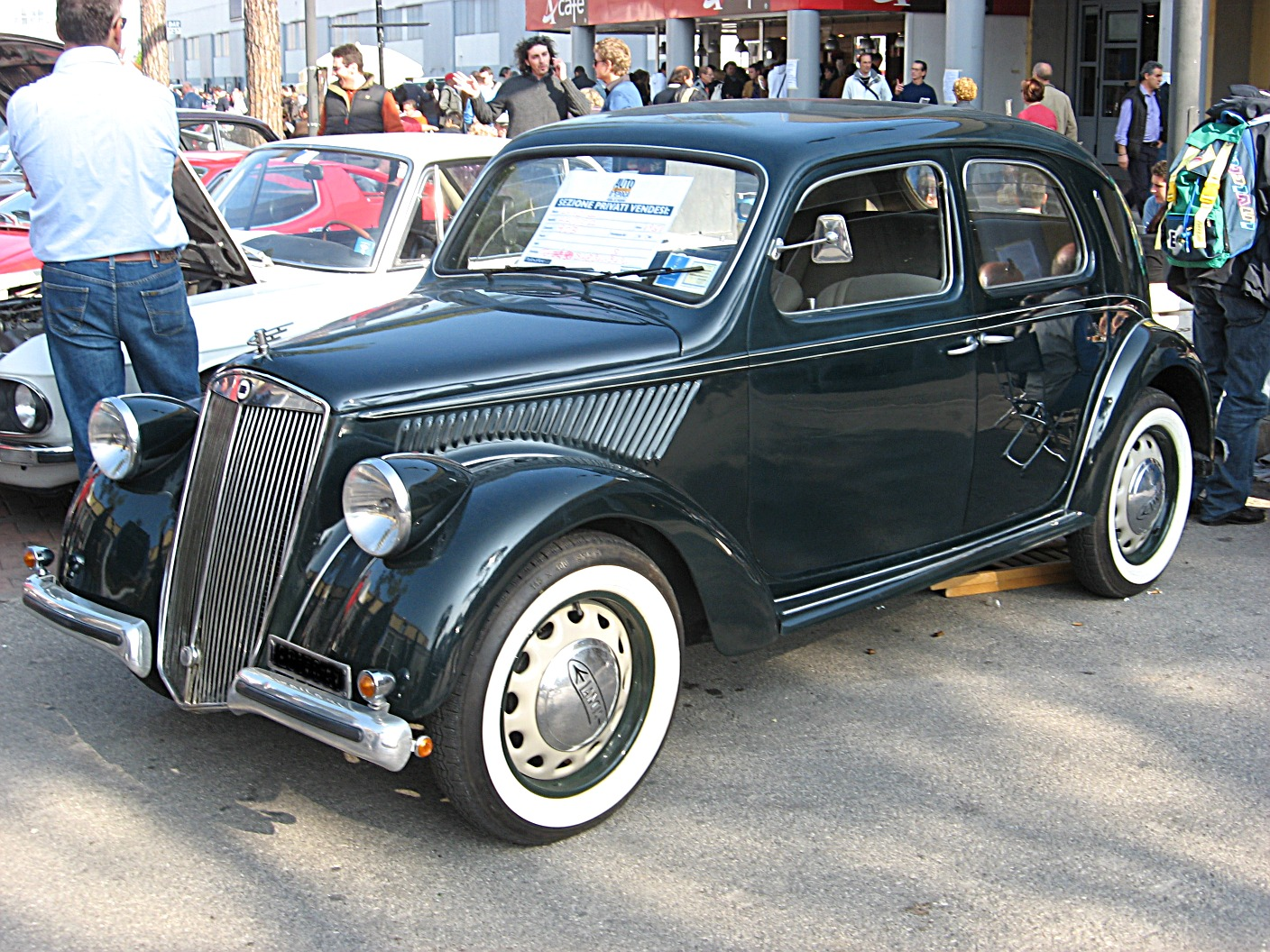

Overview
- Manufacturer: Lancia
- Production: 1939–1953 approx 32 000 vehicles

Body and chassis
- Class: Small family car (C)
- Body style: 4-door saloon; 2-door pickup (Camioncino); 3-door van (Furgoncino); 4-door taxi (Tassì Roma)
- Layout: Front-engine, rear-wheel-drive

Powertrain
- Engine: 903 cc Lancia V4; Max. Power output 26 bhp (19 kW) at 4600 rpm
- Transmission: 4-speed manual (1939–1948); 5-speed manual (1948–1953)

Dimensions
- Wheelbase: 2,440 mm (96.1 in); 2,500 mm (98.4 in) (pick-up/van); 2,950 mm (116.1 in) (taxi)
- Length: 3,615 mm (142.3 in)
- Width: 1,380 mm (54.3 in)
- Kerb weight: 780 kg (1,720 lb) (saloon)

Chronology
- Predecessor: Lancia Augusta
- Successor: Lancia Appia

The Lancia Ardea is a small family car produced by Italian car manufacturer Lancia between 1939 and 1953. Its unusually short bonnet reportedly contained the smallest V4 engine ever commercialized in a small family car.

Nearly 23,000 of the Ardeas produced were standard bodied saloons but between 1940 and 1942 approximately 500 Ardeas were manufactured with lengthened bodies and a squared off rear cabin for use in Rome as taxis. After the war more than 8,500 commercial adaptations of the Ardea known as 'furgoncini' (light van versions) and the 'camioncini' (car based light trucks) were also produced.

The third series Ardea, produced from 1948, was the first mass-produced car with a 5-speed manual transmission. Ardea was named either after Ardea town (Lazio), or Via Ardeatina, Roman road leading from Rome to that town.

== The cabin ==
Instrumentation included a centrally mounted speedometer, the fuel level and the oil pressure. A third dial directly below the driver's sight line was a clock, unusually on this size of car. The three floor pedals followed the pattern still 'conventional' for a manual transmission car (clutch, brake, gas) but to the left of the clutch pedal was a small foot-operated dipper switch for the headlights. Control knobs lined up along the base of the fascia included a hand throttle.

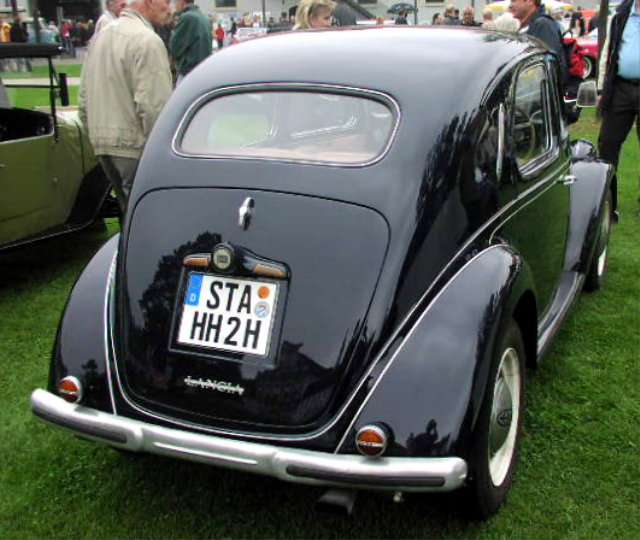
Lancia Ardea

Early Italian images of Ardea interiors confirm that Lancias of the period were still right hand drive, a position elsewhere taken to imply driving on the left side of the road. However, right-hand drive is practical even where drivers drive on the right-hand side of the road as it allows a better view of the edge of the road, which is useful when driving on rough roads in mountainous districts. This did mean that drivers of cars with centrally located floor mounted gear shifts, such as the Ardea, needed to learn how to shift with the left hand. During the 1920s Italian leader Benito Mussolini required all Italian drivers to drive on the right, but Lancia would continue, through the 1950s, to supply right hand drive cars in areas viewed by other automakers as left hand drive markets.

== History ==
Four versions of the Ardea were built:

- 1st series, produced between 1939 and 1941, 2,992 built.
- 2nd series, produced between 1941 and 1948, 4,438 built. 12 Volt electric system introduced.
- 3rd series, produced between 1948 and 1949, 3,600 built. 5-speed gearbox introduced.
- 4th series, produced between 1949 and 1953, 11,700 built. New cylinder head, aluminium, higher compression ratio, more power: 30 bhp.

== Variants ==
Alongside the type 250 4-door saloon other body variants of the Ardea were offered.

=== Chassis ===
The Ardea was offered as bare chassis (type 350) between 1939–1941 to be bodied by independent coachbuilders. The chassis had the 2440 mm wheelbase of the saloon.

=== Ardea furgoncino and camioncino ===
The Aurelia chassis type 550 van (furgoncino, literally "small van") was built in 9 examples already in 1941, but regular production begun only in 1945. The Ardea chassis type 650 pick-up (camioncino, literally "small pickup") was introduced in 1948. In 1949 they were upgraded to fourth series specifications (5-speed gearbox and more powerful 101B engine), and continued to be built until they were superseded by equivalent versions of the Appia in 1954. Unlike on the earlier Augusta, whose commercial variants were bodied by third-party coachbuilders, these Ardeas were factory-built by Lancia.

=== Tassì Roma ===
The Tassì Roma, chassis type 450, was an Ardea derivative with special 6-window saloon body, intended for use as a taxicab. It paired the Ardea's running gear with a larger chassis (longer 2,950 mm or 116.1 in wheelbase and wider tracks) which allowed for better passenger accommodation. From 1939 to 1941 about 500 were made—501 or 511 depending on the source.

== Bibliography ==
- Amatori, Franco; et al. (1992). Storia della Lancia — Impresa Tecnologie Mercati 1906–1969. Milan: Fabbri Editori. pp. 125, 127, 365–367.
