= Lancia Lambda =

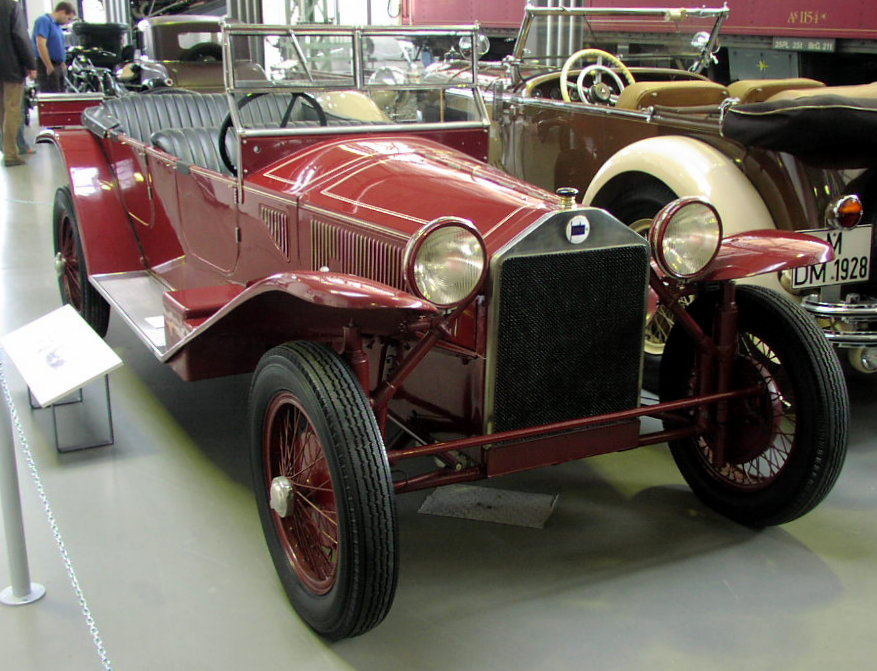
- Lancia Lambda Torpedo 1923

Overview
- Manufacturer: Lancia
- Production: 1922–1931

Body and chassis
- Body style: Torpedo (S.1-S.9); Berlina (Weymann) (S.8-S.9)
- Layout: FR layout

Powertrain
- Engine: 2119 cc Lancia V4; 2370 cc Lancia V4; 2568 cc Lancia V4
- Transmission: 3-speed manual (S.1-S.4); 4-speed manual (S.5-S.9)

Dimensions
- Wheelbase: 310 cm (122.0 in) (S.1-S.9); 342 cm (134.6 in) (S.6-S.9)
- Curb weight: 1,200 kg (2,646 lb)-1,350 kg (2,976 lb)

Chronology
- Predecessor: Lancia Kappa (1919)
- Successor: Lancia Artena

The Lancia Lambda is an innovative automobile produced from 1922 through 1931. It was the first car to feature a load-bearing unitary body, (but without a stressed roof) and it also pioneered the use of an independent suspension (the front sliding pillar with coil springs). Vincenzo Lancia even invented a shock absorber for the car and it had excellent four wheel brakes. Approximately 13,000 Lambdas were produced.

Nine versions of the Lambda were built:

- 1st series, produced 1923, 400 built.
- 2nd series, produced between 1923 and 1924, 1,100 built. Minor modifications for engine.
- 3rd series, produced 1924, 800 built. Engine modified.
- 4th series, produced between 1924 and 1925, 850 built. Modified windscreen.
- 5th series, produced 1925, 1,050 built. 4-speed gearbox.
- 6th series, produced between 1925 and 1926, 1,300 built. Car is sold now with bare chassis and with two wheelbases.
- 7th series, produced between 1926 and 1928, 3,100 built. New bigger engine.
- 8th series, produced between 1928 and 1930, 3,903 built. Again bigger engine.
- 9th series, produced 1931, 500 built. Last series sold only bare chassis.

== Engines ==
The narrow-angle aluminium Lancia V4 engine was also notable. All three displacements shared the same long 120 mm (4.7 in) stroke, and all were SOHC designs with a single camshaft serving both banks of cylinders. The first engine had a 13° V angle, the second 14° and the third 13° 40'.

Model	Engine	Displacement	Power	Fuel system
S.1-S.6	V4 SOHC	2121 cc	49 PS (36 kW) at 3250 rpm	single carburetor
S.7	V4 SOHC	2375 cc	59 PS (43 kW) at 3250 rpm	single carburetor
S.8-S.9	V4 SOHC	2569 cc	69 PS (51 kW) at 3500 rpm	single carburetor

== Gallery ==
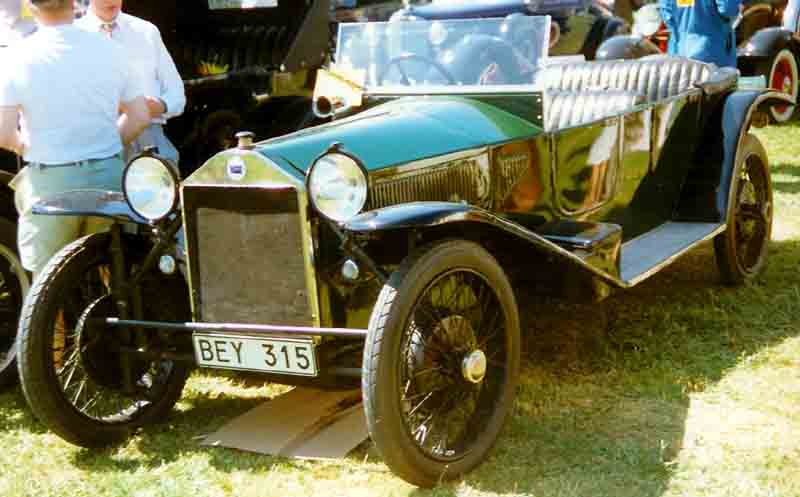
Lancia Lambda (1923)

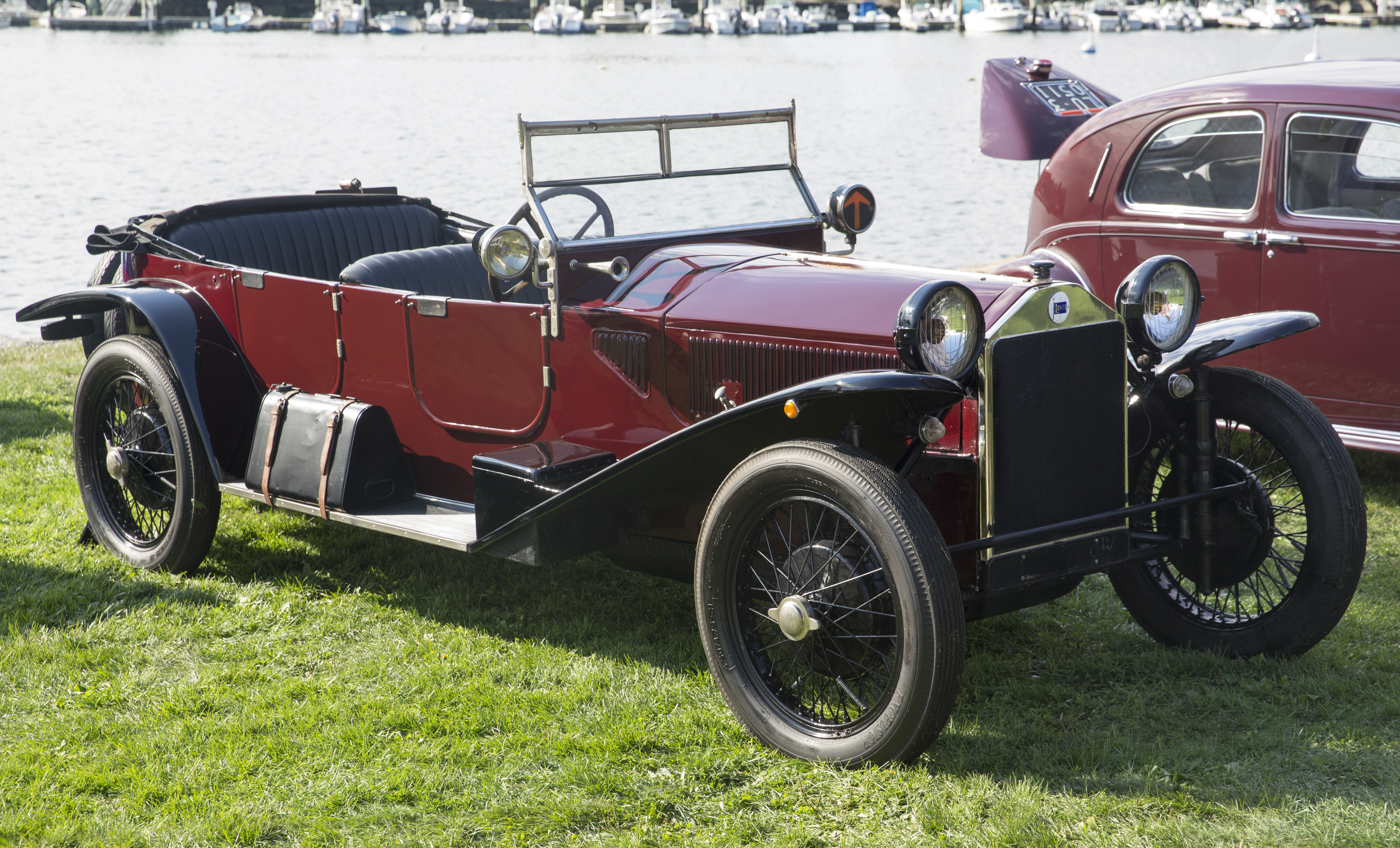
Lancia Lambda (1924)

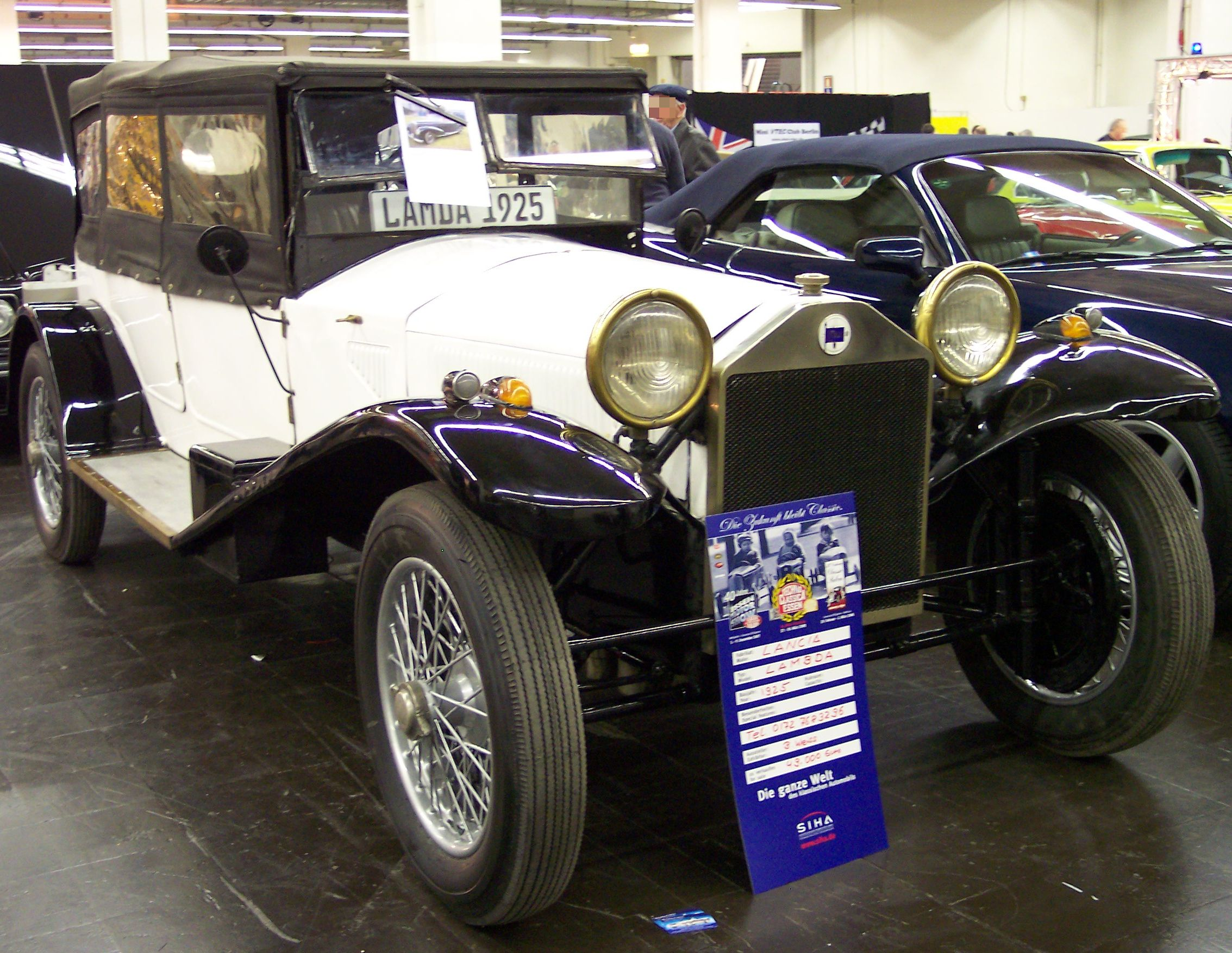
Lancia Lambda (1925)

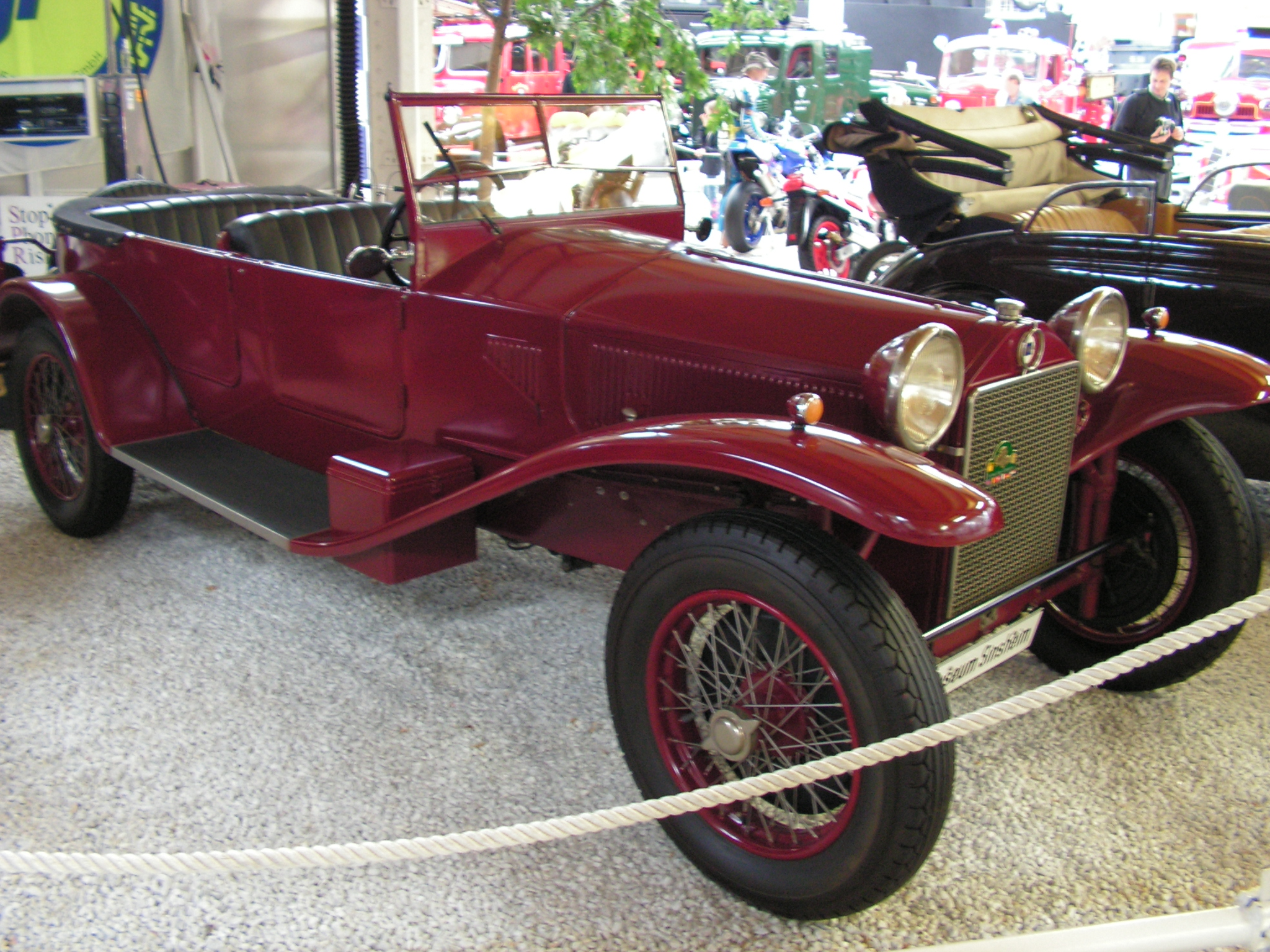
Lancia Lambda (1926)

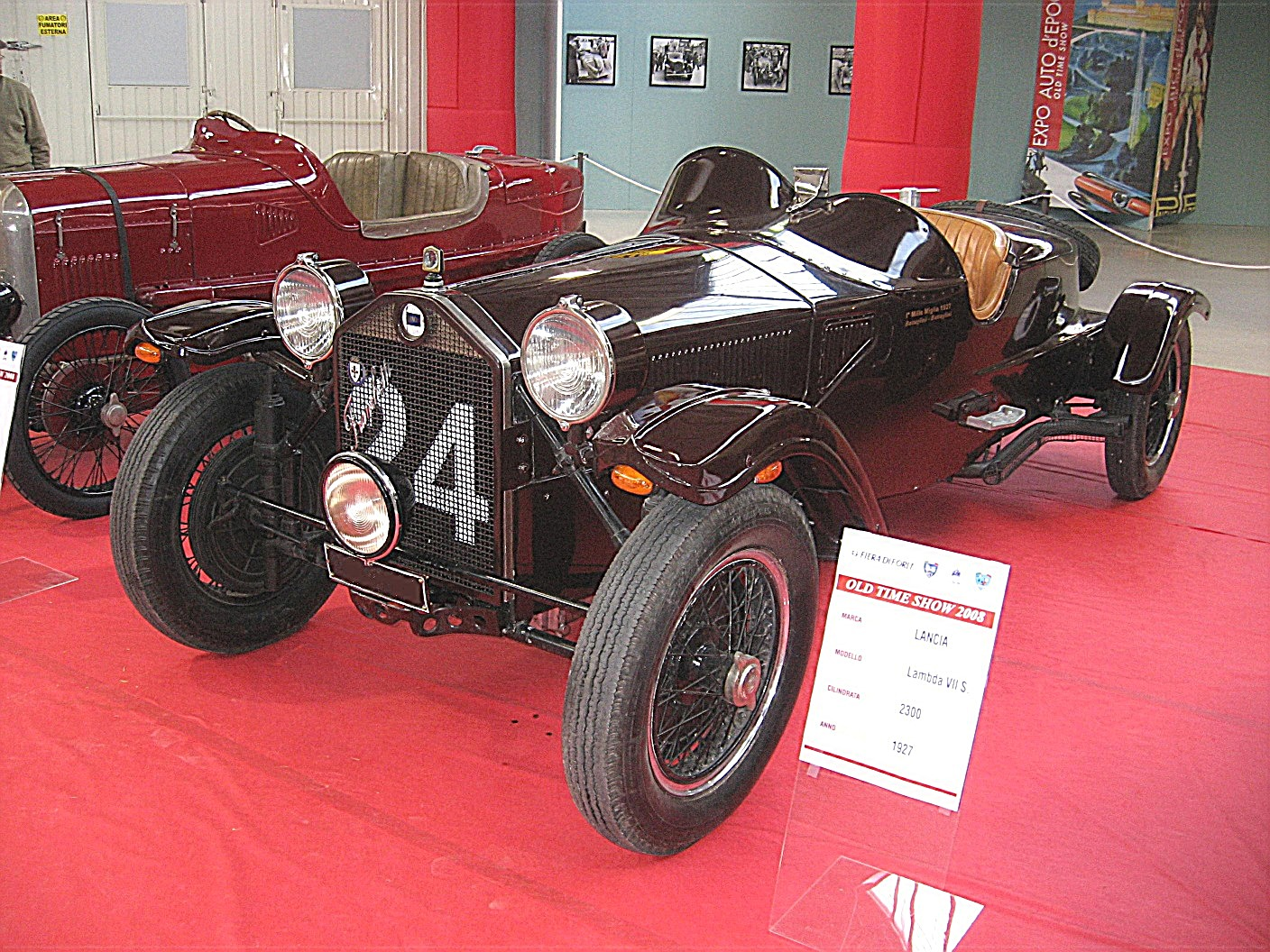
Lancia Lambda VII S (1927)

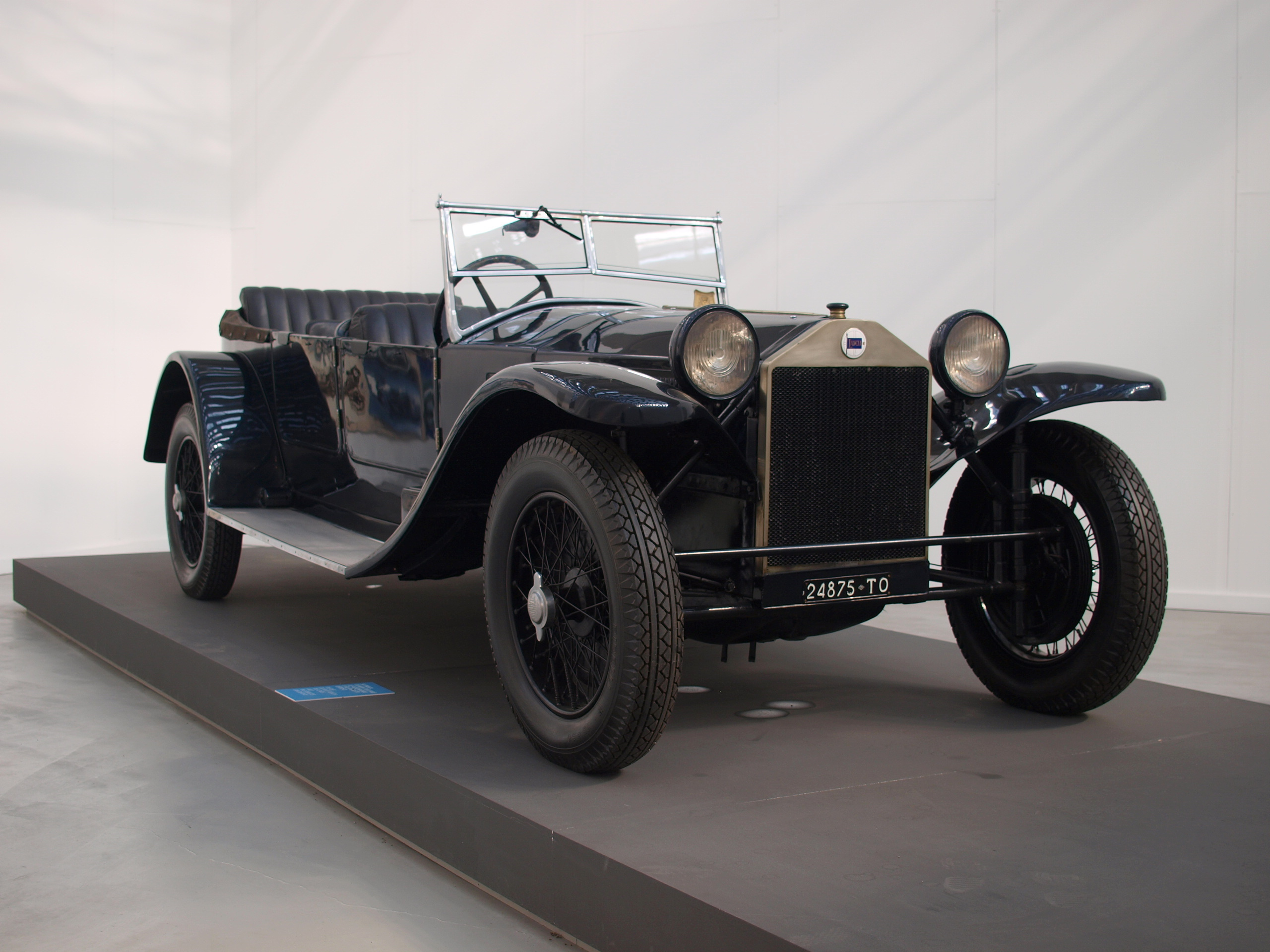
Lancia Lambda
