= Isotta Fraschini Tipo 6 LMH-C =

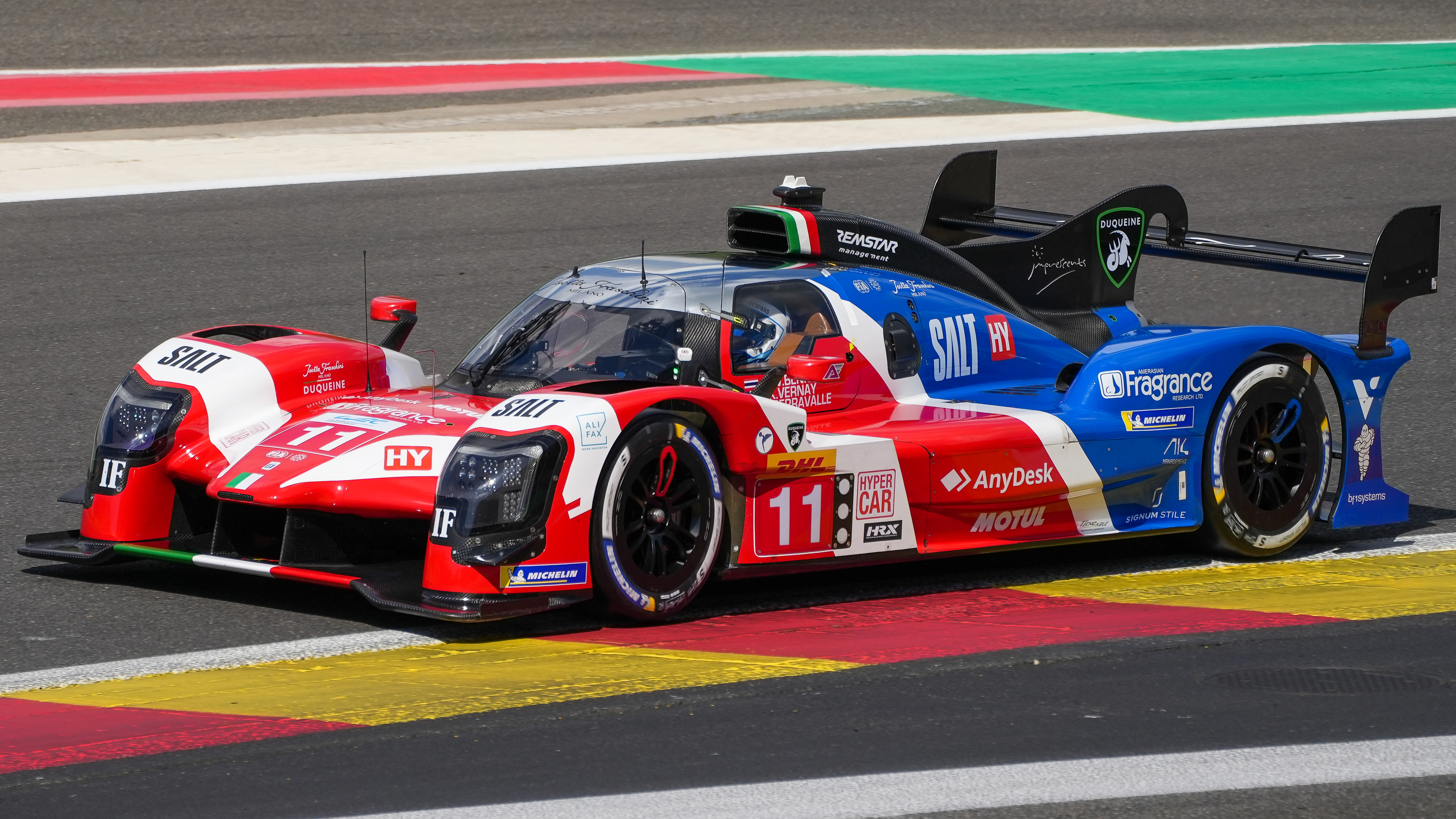
- Jean-Karl Vernay driving the No. 11 Tipo 6 LMH-C at the 2024 6 Hours of Spa-Francorchamps
- Category: Le Mans Hypercar
- Constructor: Michelotto Engineering
- Designer: Claudio Berro (Technical Director)

Technical specifications
- Chassis: Carbon fiber monocoque
- Suspension: Double-wishbone, torsion bars
- Length: 5,000 mm (200 in)
- Width: 2,000 mm (79 in)
- Height: 1,260 mm (50 in)
- Wheelbase: 3,150 mm (124 in)
- Engine: HWA 2,999 cc (183.0 cu in) 90° V6 engine Turbocharged
- Electric motor: Bosch front axle electric motor
- Transmission: Xtrac 7-speed sequential manual
- Battery: 900V lithium-ion battery
- Power: 671 bhp (680 PS; 500 kW)
- Weight: 1,030 kg (2,270 lb)
- Fuel: TotalEnergies
- Lubricants: Motul
- Brakes: Brembo carbon 380/365mm with Brembo monobloc 6-piston calipers
- Tyres: Michelin slicks with OZ one-piece forged alloys, 29/71-18 front and 34/71-18 rear

Competition history
- Notable entrants: (Italy) Isotta Fraschini
- Notable drivers: (Thailand) Carl Bennett (Canada) Antonio Serravalle (France) Jean-Karl Vernay
- Debut: 2024 Qatar 1812 km
- Last event: 2024 6 Hours of São Paulo
Races	Wins	Podiums	Poles	F/Laps
5	0	0	0	0
- Teams' Championships: 0
- Constructors' Championships: 0
- Drivers' Championships: 0

The Isotta Fraschini Tipo 6 LMH Competizione (also known as the Tipo 6 LMH-C) is a sports prototype developed by Michelotto Engineering for Isotta Fraschini to compete in the Le Mans Hypercar class. The car was originally built to compete in the FIA World Endurance Championship before being forced to withdraw in the second half of 2024. The car is set to make its competitive return in the Asian Le Mans Series.

At the time of its debut in 2024, the Tipo 6 LMH-C marked the first race car to wear an Isotta Fraschini badge in 116 years since the Tipo FE was developed in 1908.

== Background ==
Prior to the resurrection of Isotta Fraschini's car brand in 2022, the Italian marque had been absent from the car industry for nearly seven decades, with the D65 and D80 being the last mass produced Isotta Fraschini vehicles in 1955. Two concept cars, the T8 and T12, were designed in the late 1990s in an attempt to revive the brand, but each failed to reach production as the firm entered bankruptcy in 1999.

The car brand successfully relaunched in 2022 as Isotta Fraschini Milano Fabbrica Automobili s.r.l., with its management team consisting of former rally drivers Alessandro Fassina and Enzo Panacci, former Lotus executive Claudio Berro, and former Ferrari engineer and business partner Giuliano Michelotto. The group aimed to enter a Le Mans Hypercar programme in the FIA World Endurance Championship, which was confirmed to include numerous partners; Williams Advanced Engineering, HWA Team, Xtrac Limited, and Michelotto's manufacturing company Michelotto Engineering. Design and development of the car were completed entirely by Michelotto Engineering, which also holds 100% of its intellectual property rights. The first renders of the car were revealed in October 2022.

The Tipo 6 LMH Competizione was unveiled at the Automobile Club di Milano on March 2023. The car is powered by an HWA-tuned 3.0-litre 90-degree turbocharged V6 engine, featuring a Bosch front axle-mounted electric motor, together producing around 700 hp (520 kW; 710 PS). The Tipo 6 LMH-C was tested at Monza Circuit with Vector Sport and Marco Bonanomi. Vector Sport were set to race with the car but later parted ways, citing that Isotta Fraschini had failed to provide data. The following day, Isotta Fraschini announced that they would compete in the 2024 FIA World Endurance Championship with Duqueine Team.

== Competition history ==
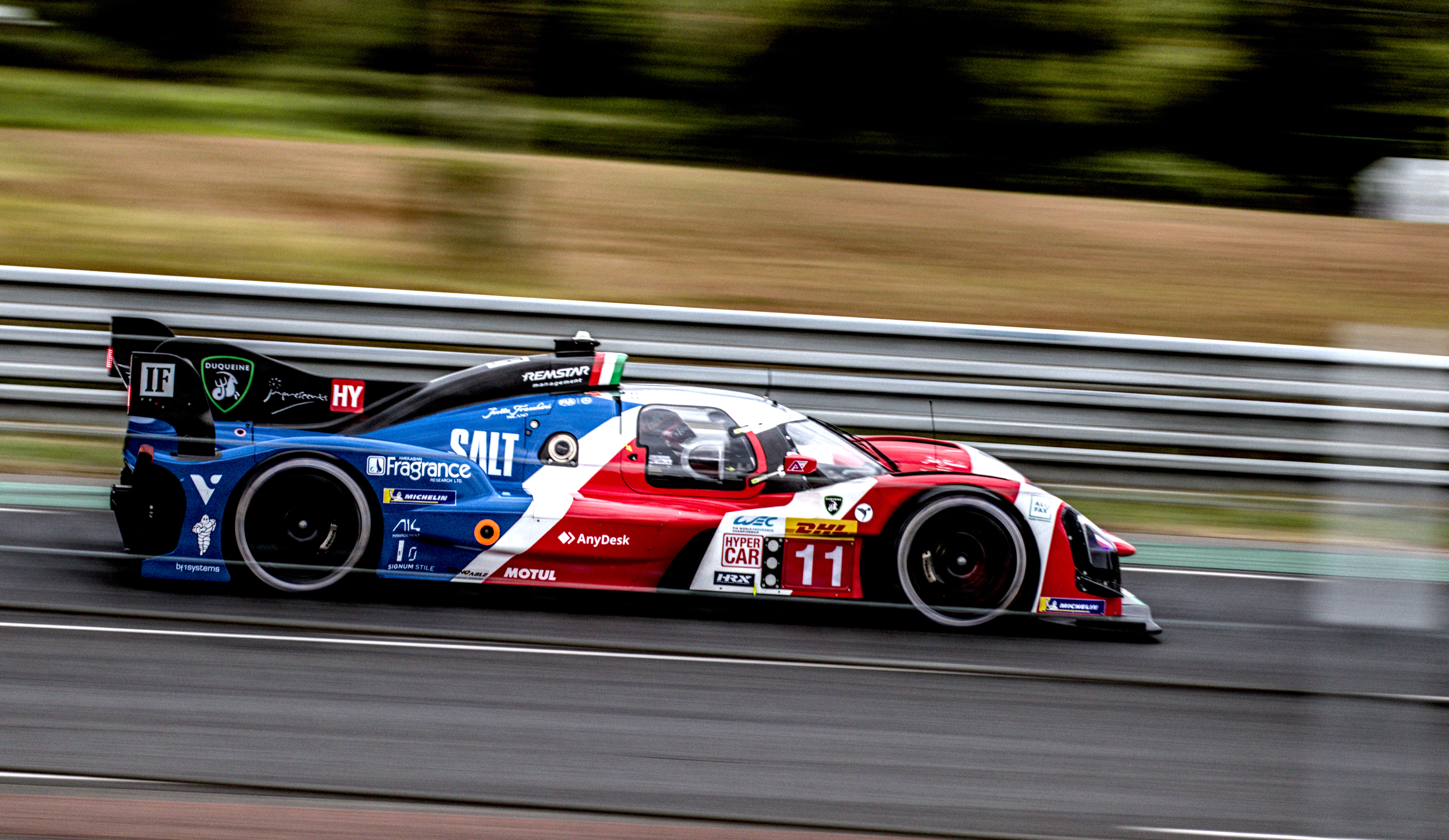
The No. 11 Isotta Fraschini Tipo 6 LMH-C at the 2024 24 Hours of Le Mans.

The Tipo 6 LMH Competizione officially debuted at the 2024 Qatar 1812 km. As the most budget-limited team on the Hypercar grid that year, the car was down on pace from the rest of the Hypercar field.

At Le Mans, the car ran a clean race and managed to finish, though it was down on pace, finishing 7 laps down on the next-best placed Hypercar. Thanks to its reliability, however, only encountering a few issues, it beat fellow series newcomers BMW and Alpine, due to the latter's mechanical issues and accidents, which left the Isotta Fraschini in 14th. In São Paulo, the car was given the largest BoP boost, and in the hands of Jean-Karl Vernay, the car leapfrogged from 19th to 15th in the opening laps. Vernay retained the position for the first 30 minutes although the car ultimately retired with an engine failure.

Prior to the 2024 Lone Star Le Mans, Isotta Fraschini announced their withdrawal from the 2024 FIA World Endurance Championship on 21 August 2024 due to a dispute with Duqueine, but stressed that they expect to return to the WEC in 2025. They also stated that they would be restructuring their motorsport programme and re-allocating their resources to expanding their road car division.

In 2026, Isotta Fraschini entered a partnership with High Class Racing, with the aim of entering the car in the 2026–27 Asian Le Mans Series and a potential return to the 24 Hours of Le Mans.

== Other versions ==
=== Tipo 6 LMH Pista ===
Isotta Fraschini also developed a track day version of Tipo 6 LMH, the Tipo 6 LMH Pista, an unrestricted version of the Tipo 6 Competizione meant for track only use.

=== Tipo 6 LMH Strada ===
In November 2023, Isotta Fraschini unveiled the Tipo 6 LMH Strada. A street legal version of the Tipo 6 LMH, featuring a 3.0-liter V6 engine as well as a hybrid system, together producing 1,020 hp (760 kW; 1,030 PS). The car is a single seater which will be priced for about 3.25 million euros. Only 12 of these cars will be produced.

== Racing results ==
=== Complete FIA World Endurance Championship results ===
(key) Races in bold indicates pole position. Races in italics indicates fastest lap.

Year	Entrant	Class	Drivers	No.	1	2	3	4	5	6	7	8	Points	Pos
2024	(Italy) Isotta Fraschini	Hypercar			QAT	IMO	SPA	LMN	SAP	COA	FUJ	BHR	0	9th
2024	(Italy) Isotta Fraschini	Hypercar	(Thailand) Carl Bennett	11	Ret	17	15	14	Ret	WD			0	9th
2024	(Italy) Isotta Fraschini	Hypercar	(Canada) Antonio Serravalle	11	Ret	17	15	14	Ret	WD			0	9th
2024	(Italy) Isotta Fraschini	Hypercar	(France) Jean-Karl Vernay	11	Ret	17	15	14	Ret	WD			0	9th
