= Isotta Fraschini Tipo 8 =

Italian car

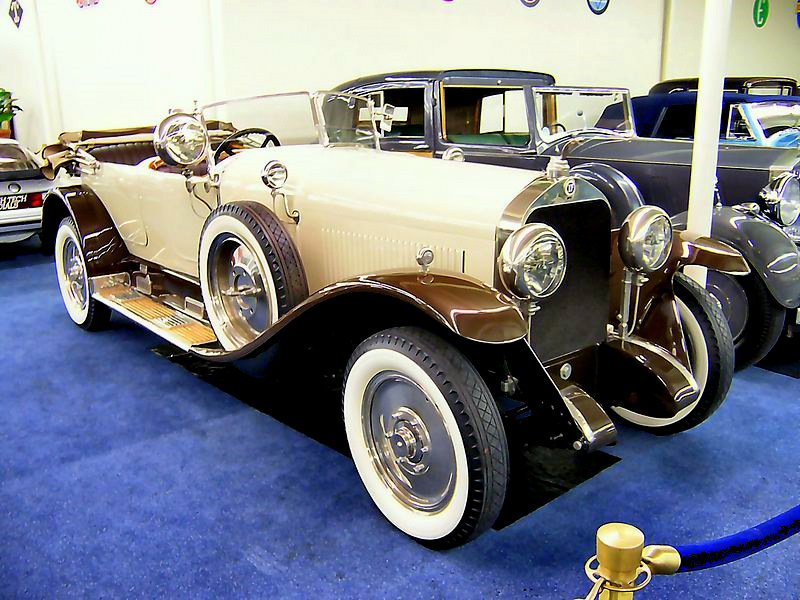

Overview
- Manufacturer: Isotta Fraschini
- Production: 1919–1924; 1,380 produced (all Tipo 8 variants)
- Assembly: Milan, Italy

Body and chassis
- Class: Luxury car
- Layout: FR layout

Powertrain
- Engine: ohv 5,902 cc (360.2 cu in) straight-8
- Transmission: 3-speed manual 4-speed manual in late models

Chronology
- Successor: Isotta Fraschini Tipo 8A

The Isotta Fraschini Tipo 8 is an Italian luxury car made by Italian manufacturer Isotta Fraschini between 1919 and 1924.

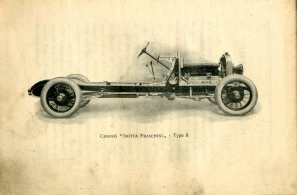
1920 Isotta Fraschini Tipo 8 chassis picture from French owner's manual

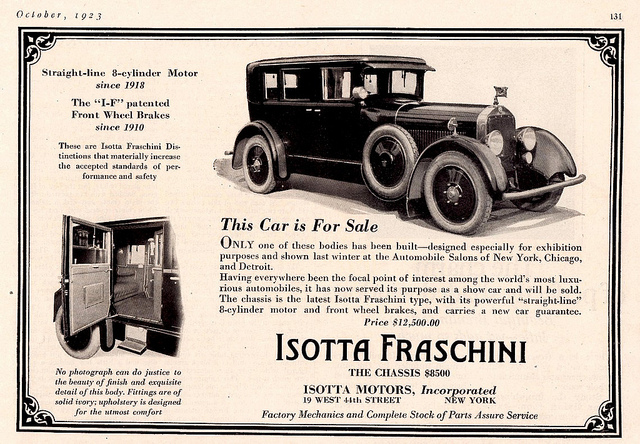
1923 Isotta Fraschini Tipo 8 American ad

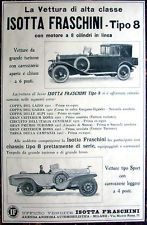
1923 Isotta Fraschini Tipo 8 Italian ad

== History ==
The Isotta Fraschini Tipo 8 is an automobile introduced in 1919 by Isotta Fraschini, a company which underwent a complete change after World War I. Until that time building a wide variety of models, the company adopted a single-series policy. Like many high end vehicles of the day, the car came from Isotta Fraschini as a chassis only. Bodies were typically from Italy's top-tier coachbuilders, Carrozzeria Castagna and Cesare Sala, but other European and American coachbuilding firms lent their hands to the task of supplying bodies. It was the first serial produced car in the world to be equipped with a straight-8 engine. With this car the company gained great name and success as a luxury car manufacturer. The main rival of the car was Rolls-Royce. The Tipo 8 was offered only with bare chassis and engine for the coachbuilders.

== Drivetrain ==
The Tipo 8's 5.9-liter overhead valve, overhead cam, was the first inline 8 engine offered in a production car. Initially producing 80 bhp (60 kW) and soon raised to 90 bhp (67 kW). There was no exterior intake manifold, instead the twin carburetors attached directly to the block. Transmissions were three-speed manual. The car had top speed of around 85 mph (137 km/h) to 90 mph (140 km/h).

== Legacy ==
The Tipo 8 and its revolutionary straight-8 engine were the basis for its successors, the Tipo 8A and Tipo 8B.

== See also ==
- Turin Auto Show
