= Isotta Fraschini Tipo FE & FENC =

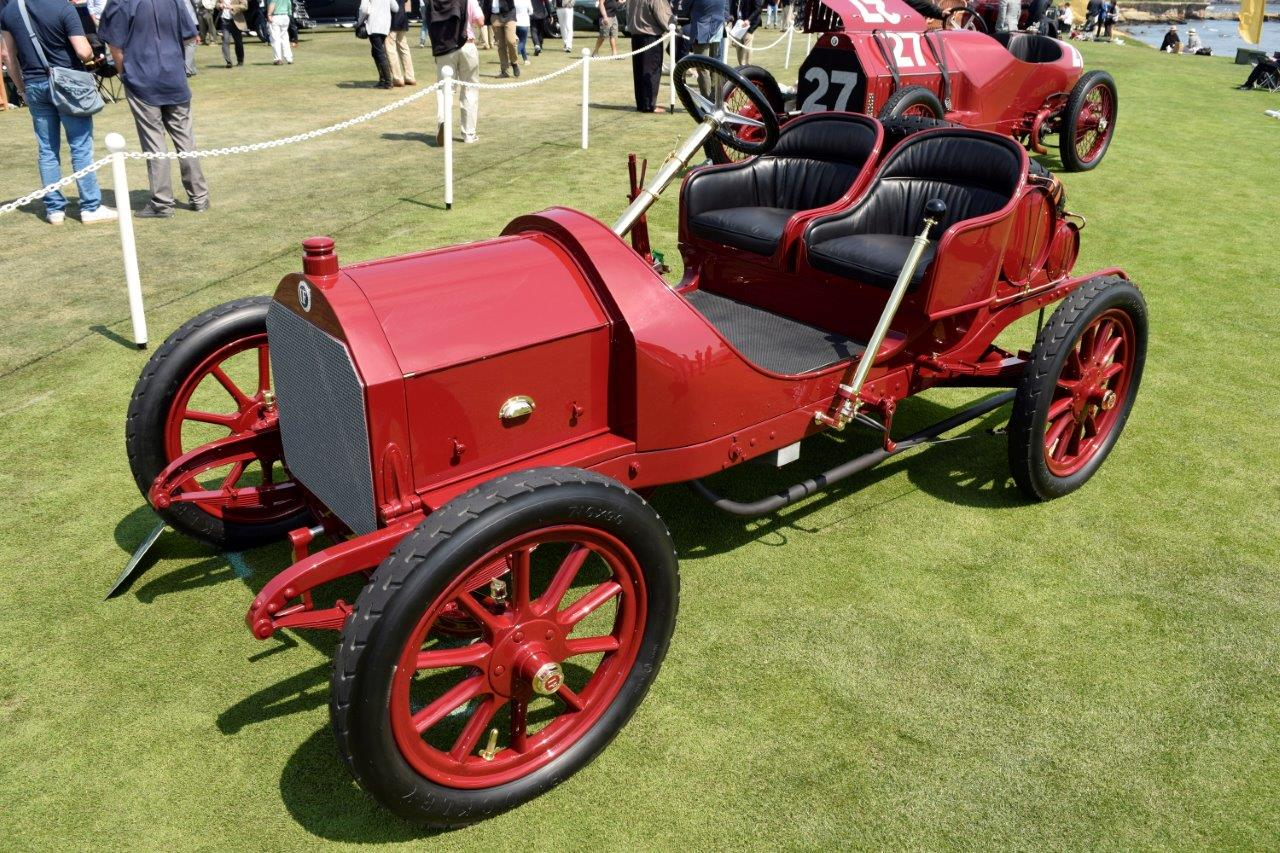
- 1909 Isotta Fraschini FENC

Overview
- Manufacturer: Isotta Fraschini
- Production: 3 (FE); <100 (FENC)
- Model years: 1908 (FE); 1909–1910 (FENC)
- Assembly: Milan, Italy
- Designer: Giuseppe Stefanini

Body and chassis
- Class: Voiturette
- Body style: 2-seat, racing and touring

Powertrain
- Engine: 1.2 L SOHC I4 (FE); 1.32 L SOHC I4 (FENC)
- Transmission: 3-speed (FE); 4-speed (FENC)

Dimensions
- Wheelbase: 2100 mm, 82.7"
- Width: track: 1250 mm, 49.2"
- Curb weight: 612 kg, 1350 lbs (FE); 657 kg, 1450 lbs (FENC)

Chronology
- Predecessor: Isotta Fraschini Tipo D

The Isotta Fraschini Tipo FE was an early Italian race car produced by Isotta Fraschini from 1908 to 1910. The Isotta Fraschini Tipo FENC is the road version and is considered one of the earliest examples of a sports car.

== History ==
Long rumored to have been designed by Ettore Bugatti, the racing FE and road going FENC voiturettes were designed by pioneering Italian engineer Giuseppe Stefanini, with collaboration from chief design engineer Giustino Cattaneo. Drawing from his first race car design, the monstrous 17.2 L SOHC inline-four in the Isotta Fraschini Tipo D, which lasted but one lap in the 1905 Gran Premio di Brescia, Stefanini applied similar principles on a diminutive scale. In early 1908 he created the Tipo FE for entry in the Grand Prix des Voiturettes at Dieppe. The racing FE was the prototype for the production model, the FENC (FE Non Competizione).

== Tipo FE ==
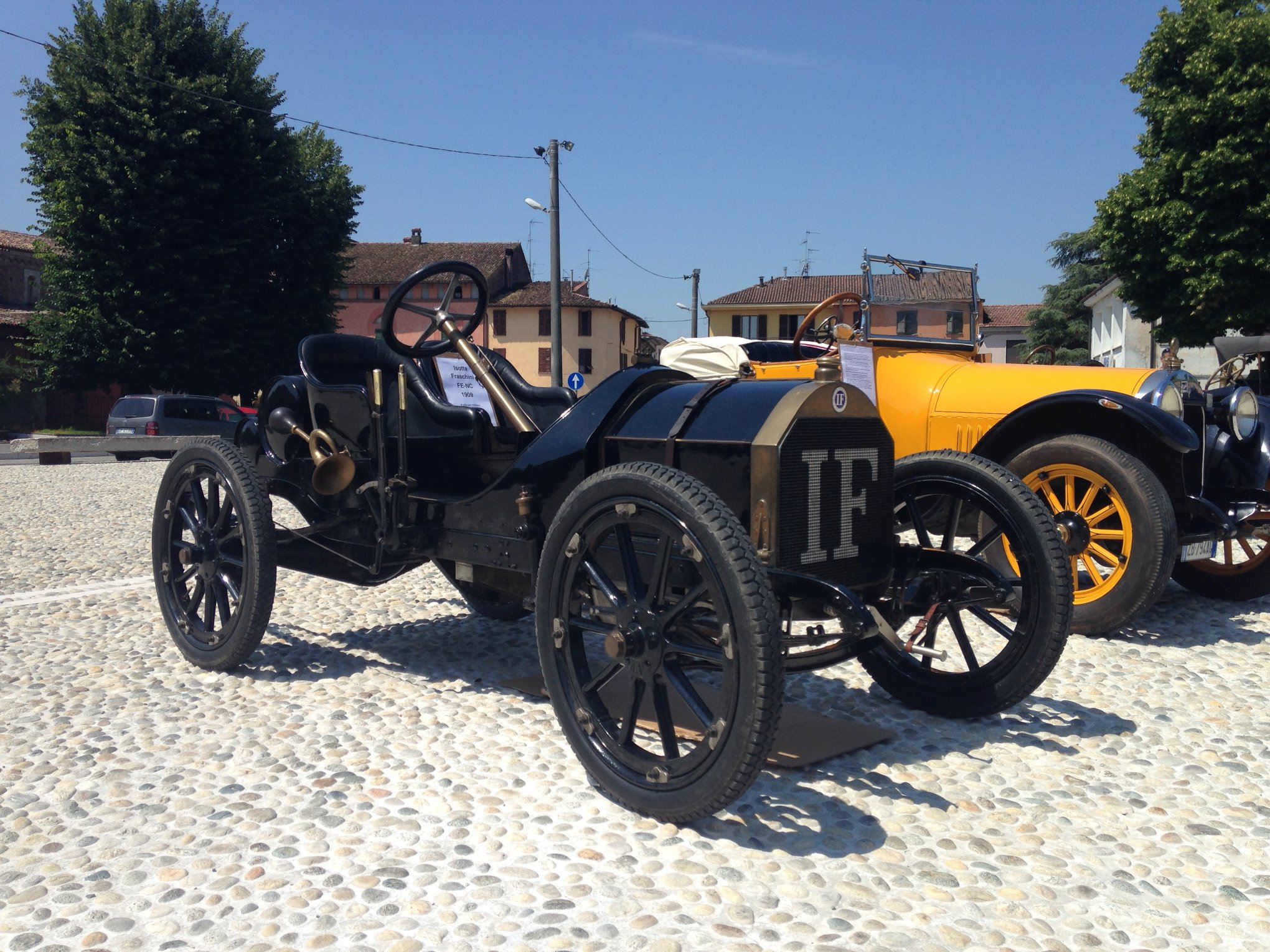
1909 Isotta-Fraschini FENC

The FE, with its innovative 3000 rpm, 18 hp, 1.2 L SOHC inline-four of 62 x 100 mm, was designed to the minimum 600 kg (1323 lbs) weight limit for the 1908 Grand Prix de Voiturettes, and had a top speed of 95 km/h at an engine speed of 2500 rpm. It featured a 3-speed transmission with direct-drive top gear (not a 3-speed with overdrive as some early historians thought). While the three examples built were not particularly successful in their only competition at Dieppe on July 6, 1908 (8th, 14th, DNF), the FE heralded the death knell for the locomotive-like single- and twin-cylinder race cars of the day. The FE's design became the Continental standard and the archetype for the small high performance sports car, although Isotta Fraschini themselves abandoned the concept almost immediately. None of the FEs are known to survive.

=== 1908 Grand Prix des Voiturettes ===
- 1908 GP des Voiturettes race results
- Photos of 1908 GP des Voiturettes

== Tipo FENC ==
Consistent with Isotta Fraschini's policy of deriving road cars from its race cars, the prototype FE quickly led to a road-going FENC design in the latter half of 1908. A larger engine capacity of 1.32 L (65 x 100 mm) rated at 14 hp at 2500 rpm, with a cross-drive water pump and magneto, and a four- rather than three-speed transmission (evidenced by driving any of the remaining FENCs) were the major changes. Four versions were offered in 1909: bare chassis, Tipo A (Dieppe racing type, no fenders, running boards, or lights), 6750 Lire (fenders, running boards, lights an additional 250 Lire) - this version $2750 US; Tipo B (touring type, cloth roof, fenders and lights), 6950 Lire; Tipo C (touring type, leather and cloth roof, fenders and lights), 7870 Lire. Top speed at 2500 rpm was 75 km/h with European wheels (710 mm) and 84 km/h with export wheels (810 mm). Due to the severe economic conditions following the Panic of 1907, and a fading of buyers' interest in voiturettes, the FENC was produced for only about one year. Today only five Tipo FENCs are known to exist of less than 100 built.
