= Isotta Fraschini =

Italian automotive and engine manufacturer

- Founded: 27 January 1900; 126 years ago in Milan, Italy
- Founder: Cesare Isotta; Vincenzo Fraschini; Oreste Fraschini; Antonio Fraschini
- Headquarters: Bari, Italy
- Products: Automobiles; Aircraft engines; Marine propulsion; Hydrogen fuel cell
- Owner: Fincantieri (engineering firm)
- Website: www.isottafraschini.com
- Footnotes; Original firm ceased production in 1949

Isotta Fraschini (Italian pronunciation: [iˈzɔtta fraˈskiːni]) is an Italian luxury car manufacturer and industrial engineering business.

Founded in Milan, Italy, in 1900 as Società Milanese Automobili Isotta, Fraschini & C. by Cesare Isotta and the Fraschini brothers, Vincenzo, Antonio, and Oreste, the company first started as an importer, assembling Mors and Renault automobiles with Aster engines, but by 1904, they began manufacturing their own products and were among the earliest users of the four-wheel brake system, the overhead camshaft configuration, and the straight-eight engine. By the 1920s, Isotta Fraschini gained notoriety among the upper class for their production of luxury cars and saw further prominence in media and literature.

The Great Depression and the Second World War adversely affected Isotta Fraschini's automobile business in the 1930s, prompting the company to shift to producing industrial aircraft engines; however, they eventually ceased production altogether, entering liquidation in 1949 and leaving their name on the company register. The company merged with mechanical engineering manufacturer Breda in Saronno and was subsequently renamed F.A. Isotta Fraschini e Motori Breda in 1955. The trademark for Isotta Fraschini was separated into two entities in the 1990s, with the engineering firm relocating to Bari, becoming Isotta Fraschini Motori S.p.A. and continuing to manufacture industrial services under the ownership of Fincantieri. The automotive and motorsport marque was revived in 2022 as Isotta Fraschini Milano Fabbrica Automobili s.r.l., based in Milan.

== History ==
=== Original firm ===
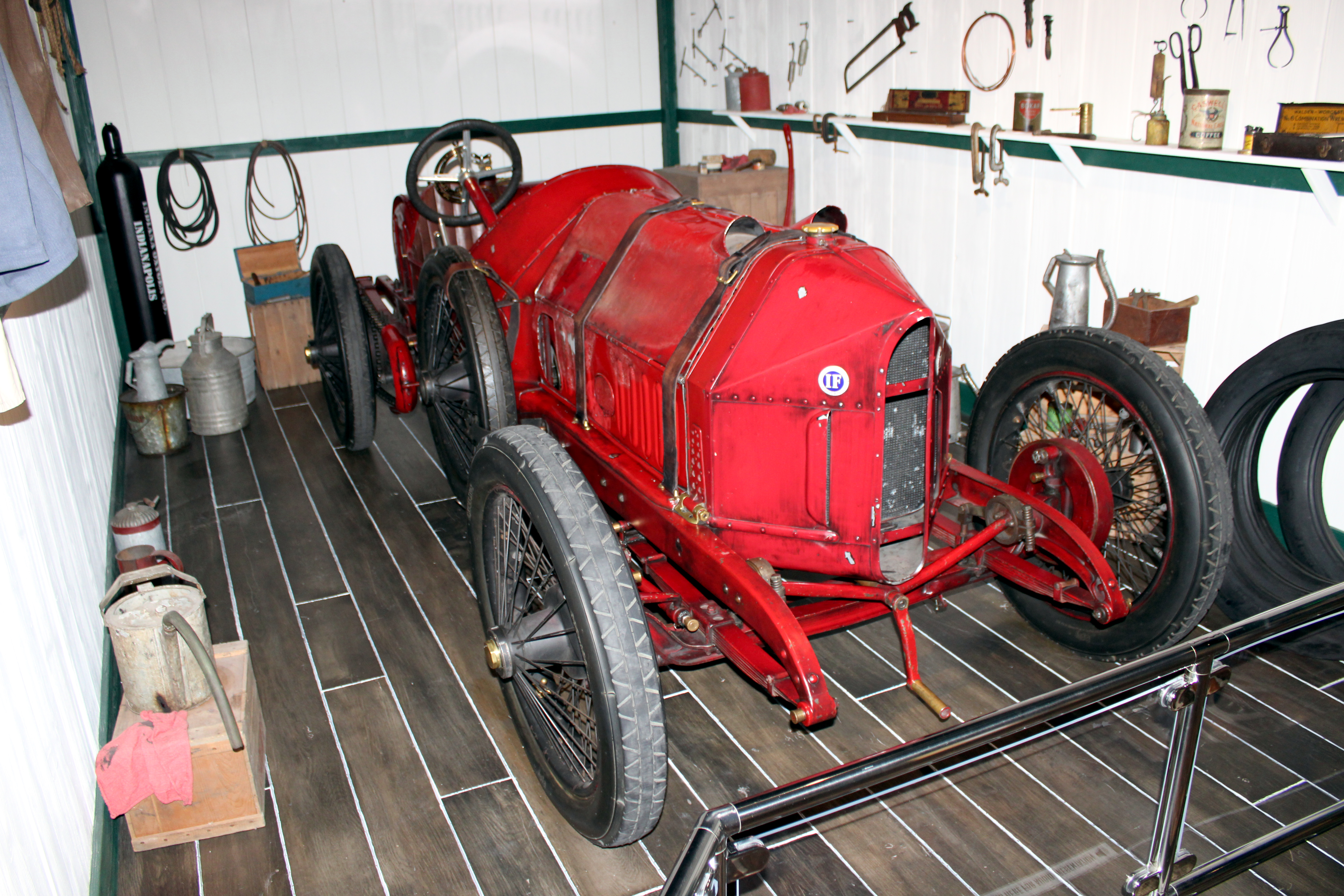
Ray Gilhooley's 1914 Isotta Fraschini Tipo IM on display at the Indianapolis Motor Speedway Museum.

The firm was named for its founders, Cesare Isotta and Vincenzo Fraschini, who had been importing Mors and Renault automobiles as well as Aster proprietary engines since 1899. The company they founded as Società Milanese Automobili Isotta, Fraschini & C. on 27 January 1900 had the stated purpose to "Import, sell, repair cars". Prior to establishing their own products in 1904, Isotta and Fraschini assembled cars very similar to Renaults, with Aster engines. They differed from the real Renaults in having a neater underslung front radiator arrangement.

The first automobile bearing the Isotta Fraschini marque featured a four-cylinder engine producing 24 horsepower (18 kW). The car, driven by Vincenzo Fraschini, appeared in several races. In 1905, Isotta Fraschini gained notoriety at the Coppa Florio, where they entered a Tipo D with a 17.2-litre (1,050 cu in) engine producing 100 horsepower (75 kW). For a short time in 1907, Isotta Fraschini merged with the French automobile company Lorraine-Dietrich. The firm started making race cars using the engine, helping establish the company's reputation. It was also one of the first companies to successfully market cars with four-wheel brakes, following their invention by Arrol-Johnston of Scotland in 1909. In 1911, 300 automobiles were produced, and in 1912, 475 vehicles were produced. They were also among the earliest pioneers of the overhead cam with an engine designed by Giustino Cattaneo. Isotta Fraschini introduced their Tipo 8, the first production automobile to be powered by a straight-eight engine, at the Paris Salon in 1919 and began delivering them to customers in 1920.

With the growth of the wealthy middle class in North America in the 1920s, Isotta Fraschini marketed ultra-luxury deluxe limousines to the new American aristocracy. Early film stars, such as Clara Bow and Rudolph Valentino, drove Isotta Fraschinis. The brand also became prominent in literature and media, with various Isotta Fraschini models making numerous appearances in novels and movies including Tender is the Night (1933), Farewell, My Lovely (1940), Death Takes a Holiday (1934), Murder, My Sweet (1944), Without Reservations (1946), and Sunset Boulevard (1950).

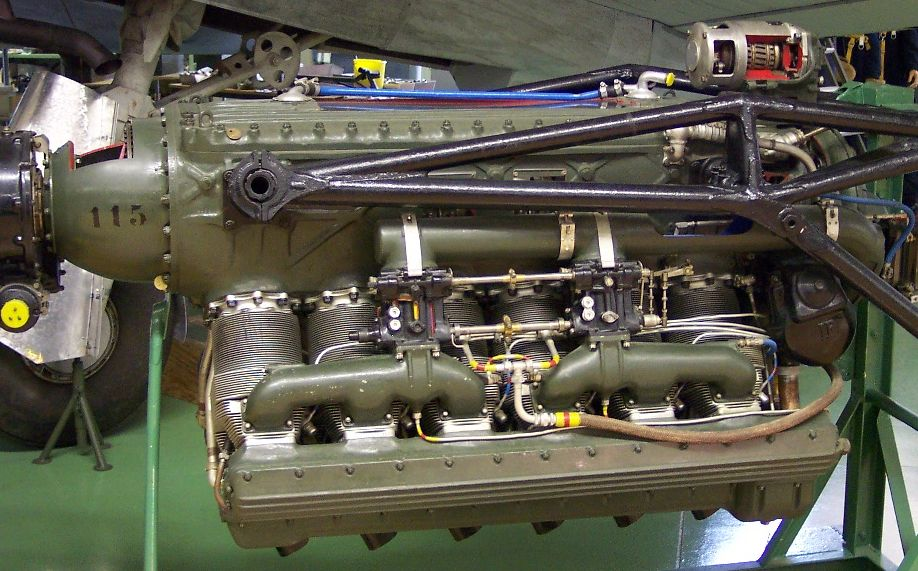
The Isotta Fraschini Delta RC131, an aircraft engine used during World War II.

In the 1930s, Isotta Fraschini struggled to maintain vehicle production, becoming affected by the Great Depression and the effects of World War II. The company's last model, the Tipo 8C Monterosa, was reported to have had a production total between three to six cars. Isotta Fraschini was able to continue their production of aircraft engines, however they later ceased production, and the original firm entered liquidation in 1949.

=== Contemporary ===
==== Revival of the automobile brand ====
In the late 1990s, Italian entrepreneur Giuliano Malvino attempted to revive the Isotta Fraschini marque in the car industry. Two concept cars were developed under Malvino's new firm, the Isotta Fraschini T8 and T12, designed by American designer Tom Tjaarda. Neither car made it out of the prototype phase, and Malvino's firm fell into bankruptcy in 1999.

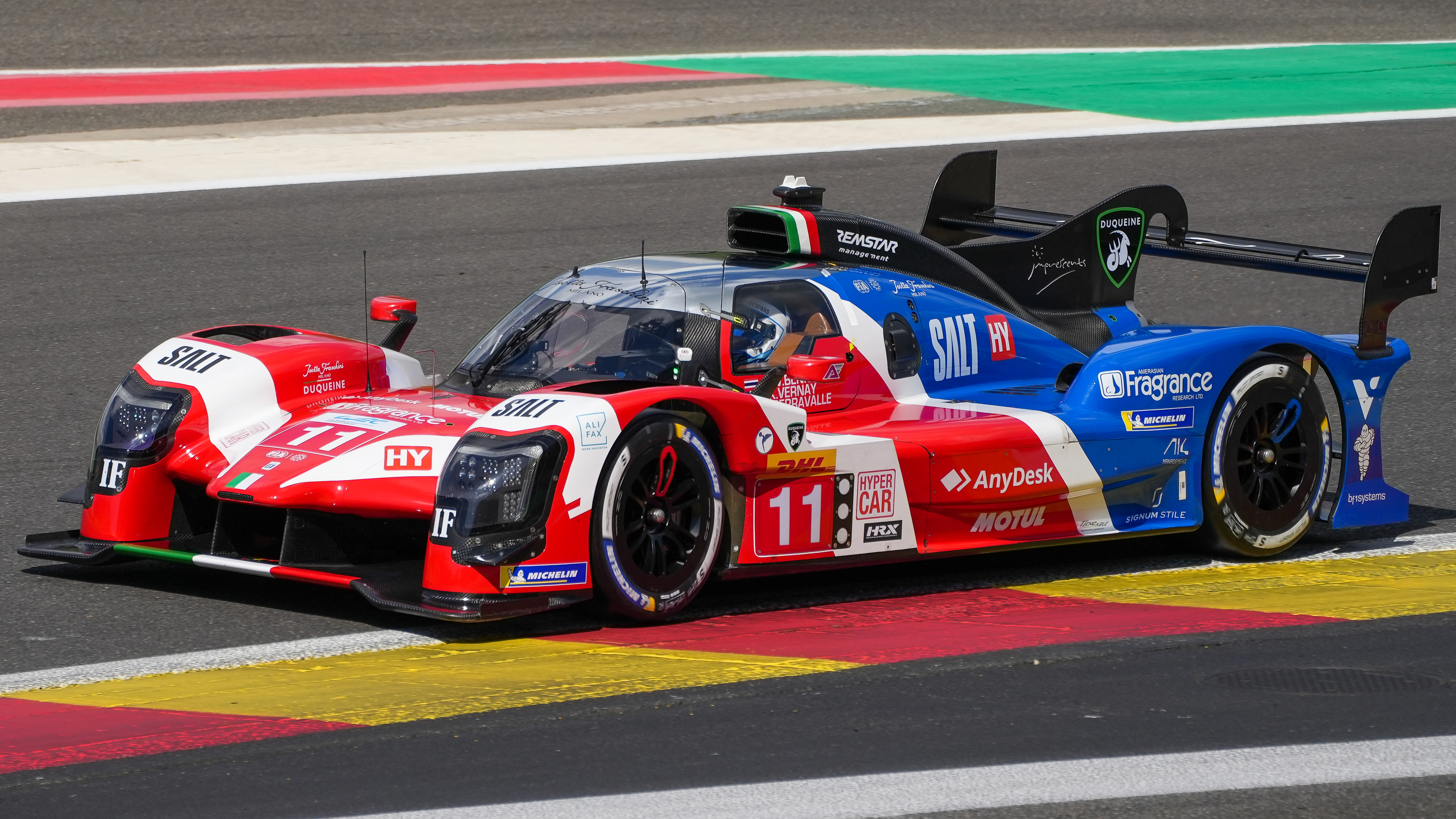
The No. 11 Tipo 6 LMH-C at Circuit de Spa-Francorchamps during the 2024 FIA World Endurance Championship.

Three decades after Malvino's efforts to resurrect the Isotta Fraschini name in the car industry, a second attempt was made and later fully established in 2022 as Isotta Fraschini Milano Fabbrica Automobili s.r.l. in Milan, Italy, led by former rally drivers Alessandro Fassina and Enzo Panacci, former Lotus executive Claudio Berro, and Michelotto Engineering founder and engineer Giuliano Michelotto. The new group confirmed plans to enter a Le Mans Hypercar into the FIA World Endurance Championship, and numerous technical partners would be confirmed as being a part of the project, including Michelotto's company Michelotto Engineering, Williams Advanced Engineering, HWA Team, ARS Technologies, and Xtrac Limited. The Isotta Fraschini Tipo 6 LMH Competizione was unveiled in March 2023, and was set to be raced in the series by Vector Sport, however, they were later replaced by Duqueine Team, as the former dropped out due to alleged contract breaches by Isotta Fraschini, who in turn cited "economic factors" for the split. Originally set to race in 2023, its debut was pushed back to 2024. A track day version of the car, the Tipo 6 LMH Pista, was presented at Paul Ricard, and completed laps with the GT1 Sports Club session as part of the 1000 km of Paul Ricard weekend.

Carl Bennett, Antonio Serravalle, and 2013 24 Hours of Le Mans Pro-Am winner Jean-Karl Vernay completed the lineup. The brand competed in five races in its only season in the FIA World Endurance Championship, finishing three before withdrawing from the series prior to the 2024 Lone Star Le Mans due to internal disputes with Duqueine. Its highest finish was at Le Mans, placing fourteenth, and scored no points during the season. Two years later, Isotta Fraschini entered a partnership with High Class Racing, with the aim of entering the car in the 2026–27 Asian Le Mans Series and a potential return to the 24 Hours of Le Mans.

==== Industrial engine manufacturing ====
Following the original firm's liquidation in 1949, the company name remained on the registry, and in 1955, it was revived, merging with engine manufacturer Breda Motori and subsequently named F.A. Isotta Fraschini e Motori Breda. The company resumed production of trolley buses and built a new diesel engine factory in Bari, Italy in the 1960s. In the 1980s, the company was renamed Isotta Fraschini Motori S.p.A. and became part of the Fincantieri group, with its administrative headquarters in Bari. The company continues to develop industrial engines, and has recently become involved in fuel cell development and testing.

== Racing record ==
=== 24 Hours of Le Mans results ===
Year	Entrant	No.	Car	Drivers	Class	Laps	Pos.	Class Pos.
2024	(Italy) Isotta Fraschini	11	Isotta Fraschini Tipo 6 LMH-C	(Thailand) Carl Bennett (Canada) Antonio Serravalle (France) Jean-Karl Vernay	Hypercar	302	14th	14th

== Aero-engines ==
- Isotta Fraschini L.170
- Isotta Fraschini L.180 I.R.C.C.15/40 inverted W-18
- Isotta Fraschini L.180 I.R.C.C.45 inverted W-18
- Isotta Fraschini Asso 80
  - Isotta Fraschini Asso 80 R.I.
- Isotta Fraschini Asso 120 R.C.40
- Isotta Fraschini Asso 200
- Isotta Fraschini Asso 250 probably misidentification or variant of Asso 200
- Isotta Fraschini Asso 500
  - Isotta Fraschini Asso 500 AQ
- Isotta Fraschini Asso 750 (140x170=47105cc/2875cuin)
  - Isotta Fraschini Asso 750 R
  - Isotta Fraschini Asso 750 R.C.
  - Isotta Fraschini Asso 750 R.C.35
- Isotta Fraschini Asso IX
  - Isotta Fraschini Asso IX R.C.45
- Isotta Fraschini Asso 1000 (150x180=57256cc/3494cuin)
- Isotta Fraschini Asso Caccia
- Isotta Fraschini Asso XI
  - Isotta Fraschini A.120 R.C.40 – (inverted version of Asso XI)
  - Isotta Fraschini L.121 R.C.40 – (version of Asso XI)
- Isotta Fraschini Asso (racing)
- Isotta Fraschini Beta
  - Isotta Fraschini Beta R.C.10
- Isotta Fraschini Gamma
  - Isotta Fraschini Gamma R.C.15I
  - Isotta Fraschini Gamma R.C.35IS
- Isotta Fraschini Delta
- Isotta Fraschini Zeta
  - Isotta Fraschini Zeta R.C.25/60
  - Isotta Fraschini Zeta R.C.35
  - Isotta Fraschini Zeta R.C.42
- Isotta Fraschini Astro 7
  - Isotta Fraschini Astro 7 C.21
  - Isotta Fraschini Astro 7 C.40
- Isotta Fraschini Astro 14
  - Isotta Fraschini Astro 14 C.40
  - Isotta Fraschini Astro 14 R.C.40
- Isotta Fraschini V.4
- Isotta Fraschini V.5
- Isotta Fraschini V.6
- Isotta Fraschini 245hp
- Isotta Fraschini K.14 – licence built Gnome-Rhône Mistral Major
- Isotta Fraschini 80 R
- Isotta Fraschini 80 T

== Vehicles ==
=== Passenger cars ===
- Runabout 1901–1902
- Tipo FENC 1908
- Tipo KM 1910–1914
- Tipo IM 1913
- Tipo 8 1919–1924
- Tipo 8A 1924–1931
- Tipo 8B 1931–1935
- Tipo 8C Monterosa 1948–1949
- T8 1996
- T12 1998
- Tipo 6 LMH Pista 2024
- Tipo 6 LMH Strada 2024

=== Racing cars ===
- Tipo D 1905
- Tipo FE 1908
- Tipo 6 LMH-C 2024

=== Trucks/buses ===
- D80 1934–1955
- D65 1940–1955

=== Trolleybuses ===
- TS 40F1
- F1
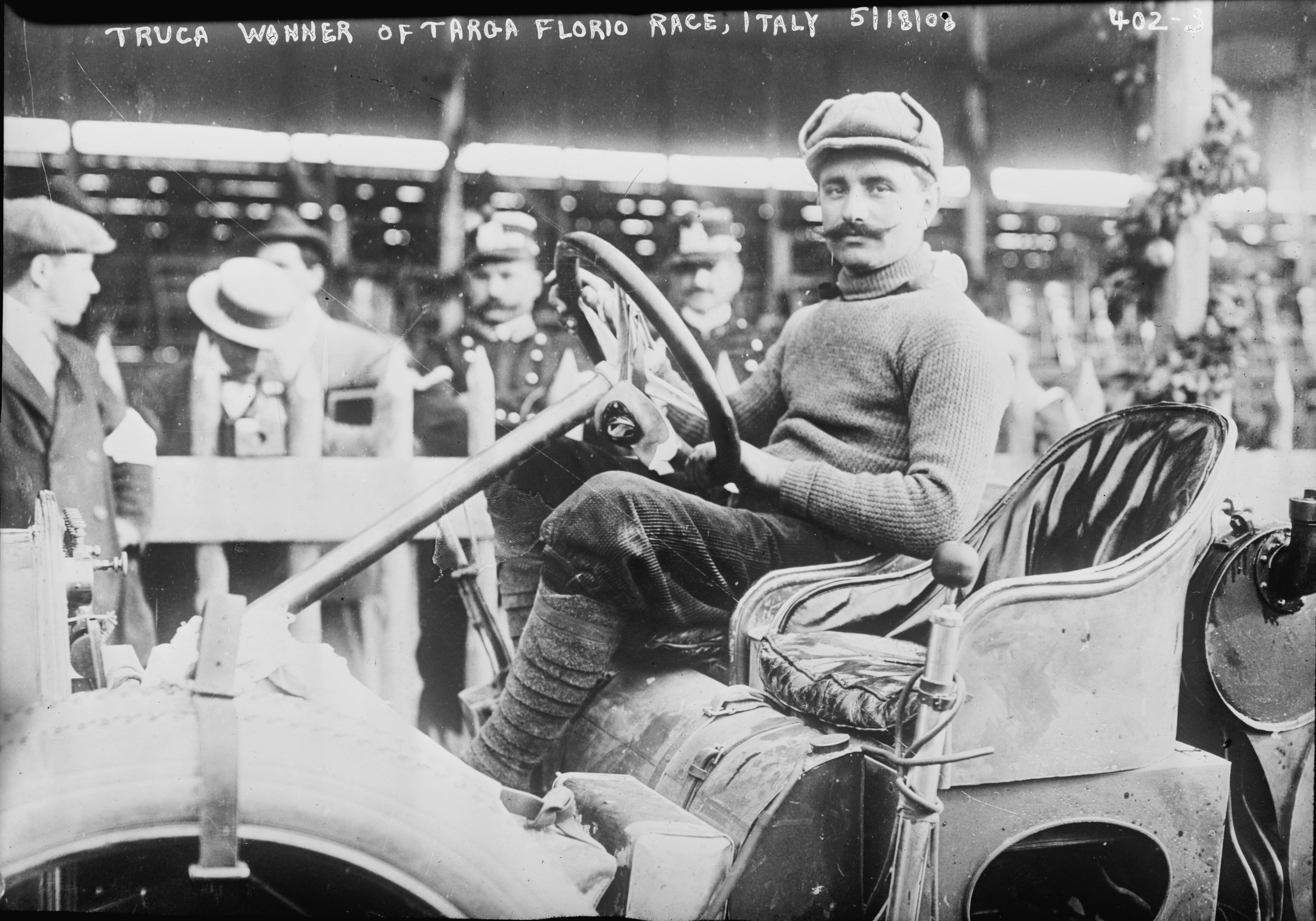
Vincenzo Trucco won the 1908 Targa Florio with Isotta Fraschini Type I.

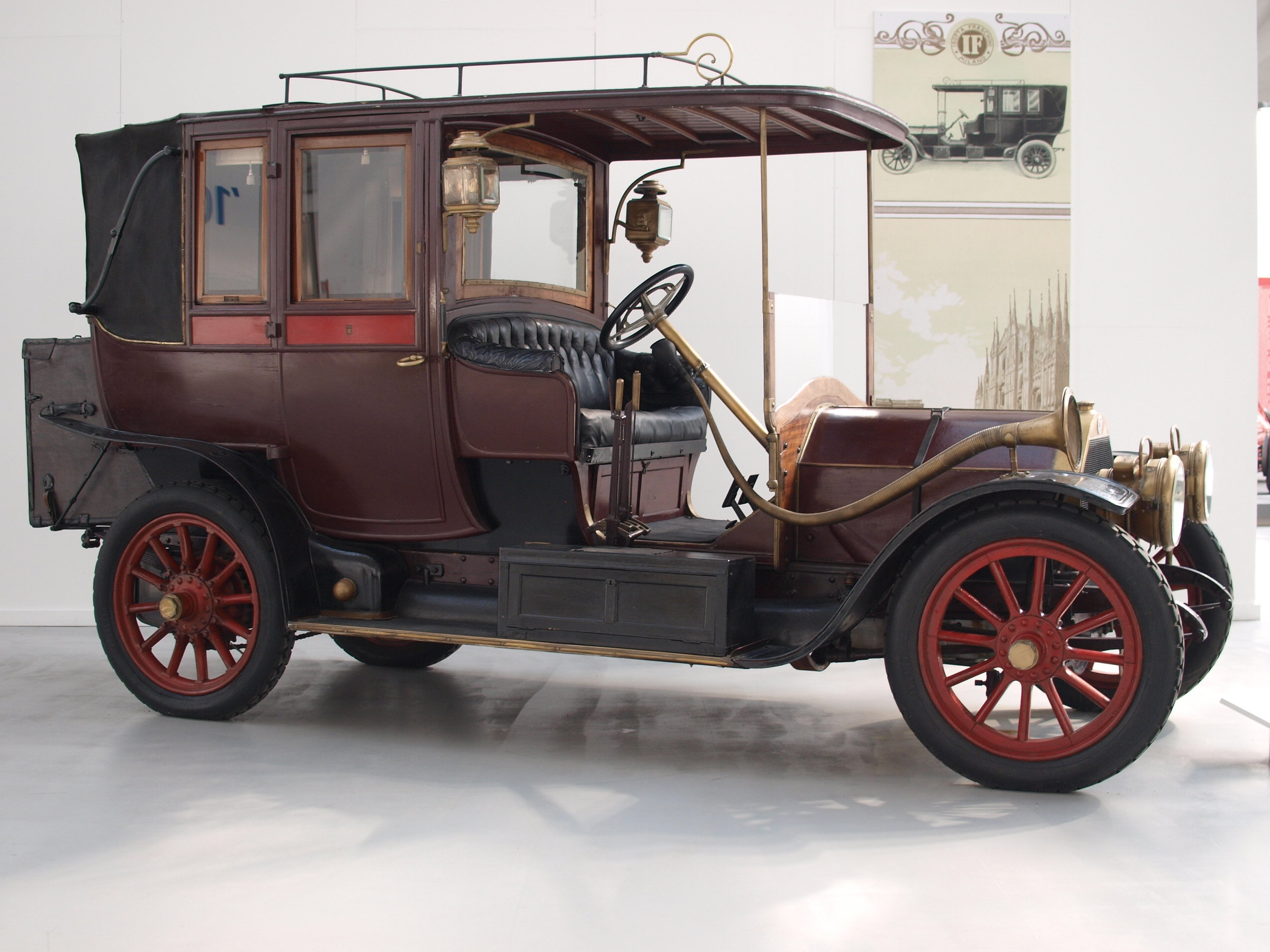
AN 20/30 (1909)

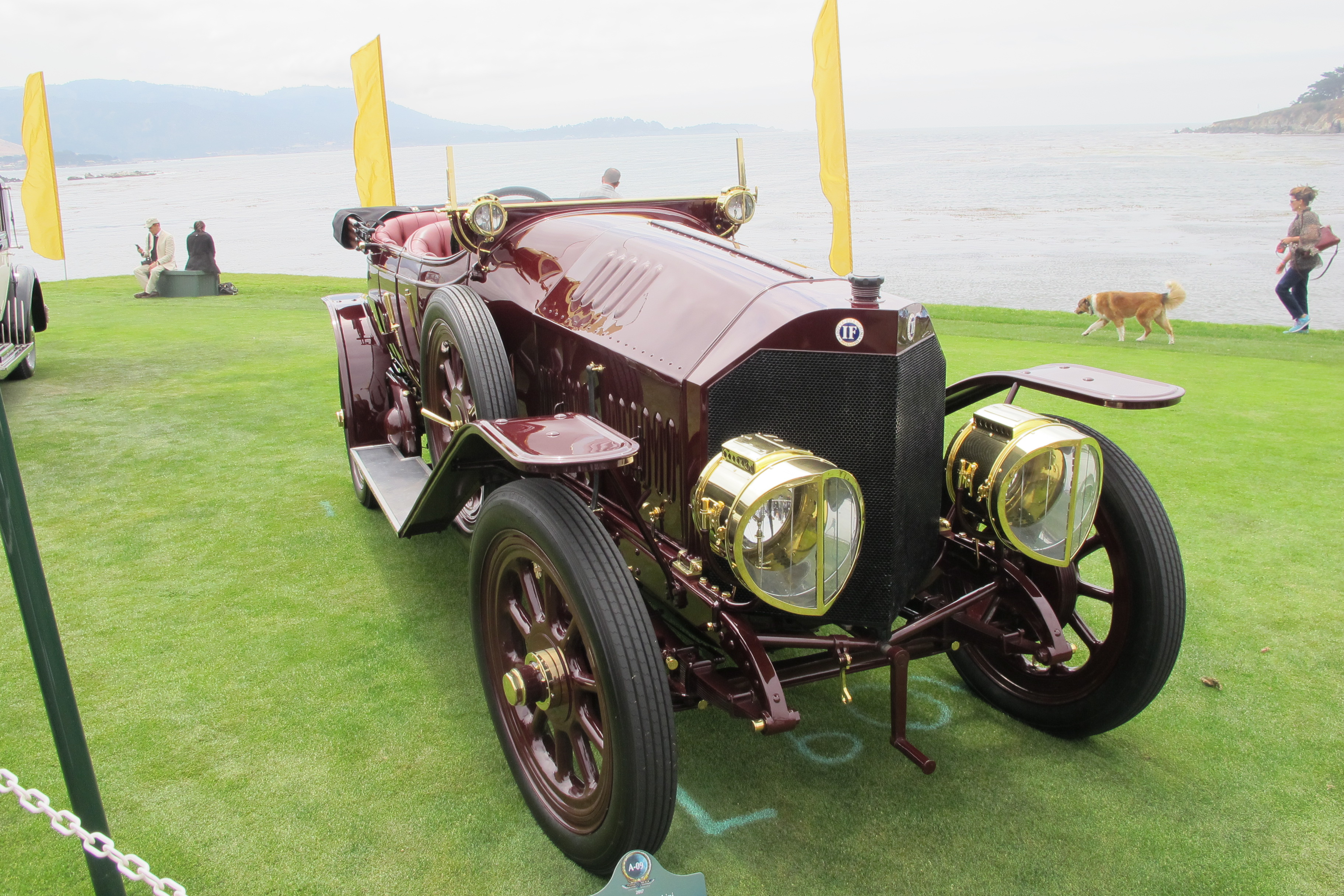
KM4 Tourer (1913)

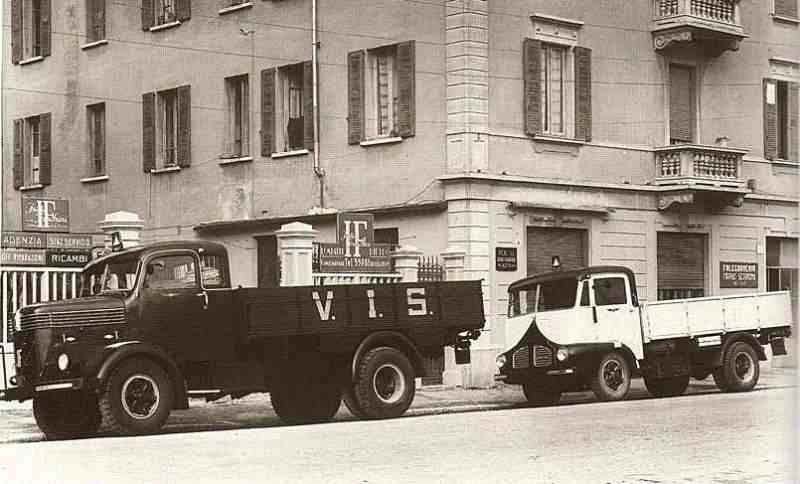
D80 (left) and D65 (right)

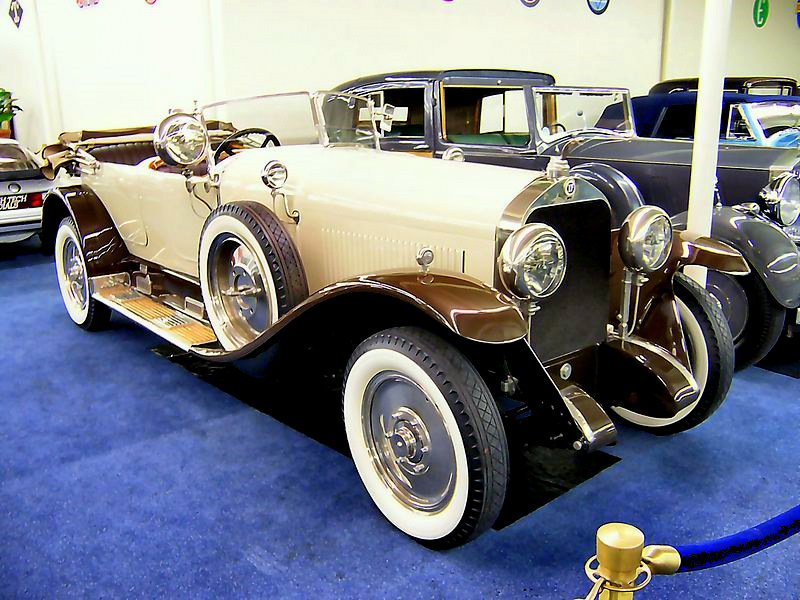
Tipo 8 Sala Phaeton

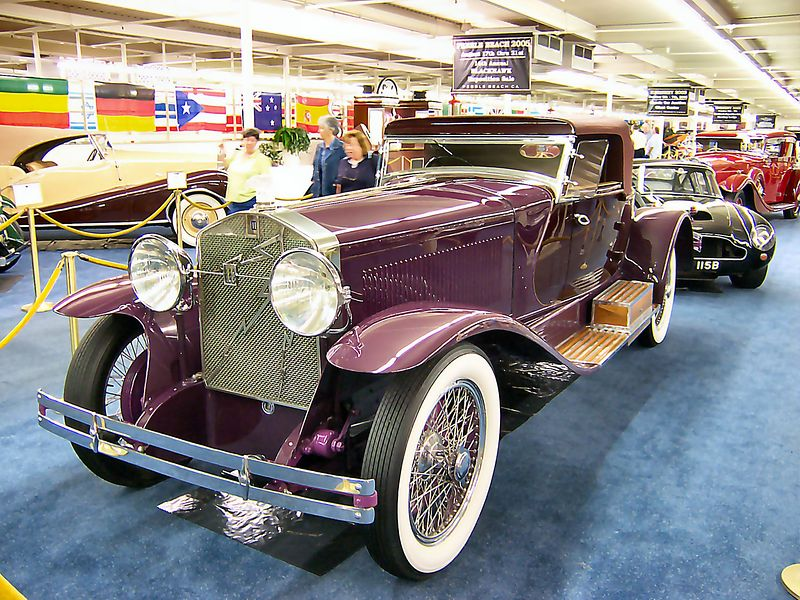
Tipo 8A S LeBaron Boattail Roadster (1928)

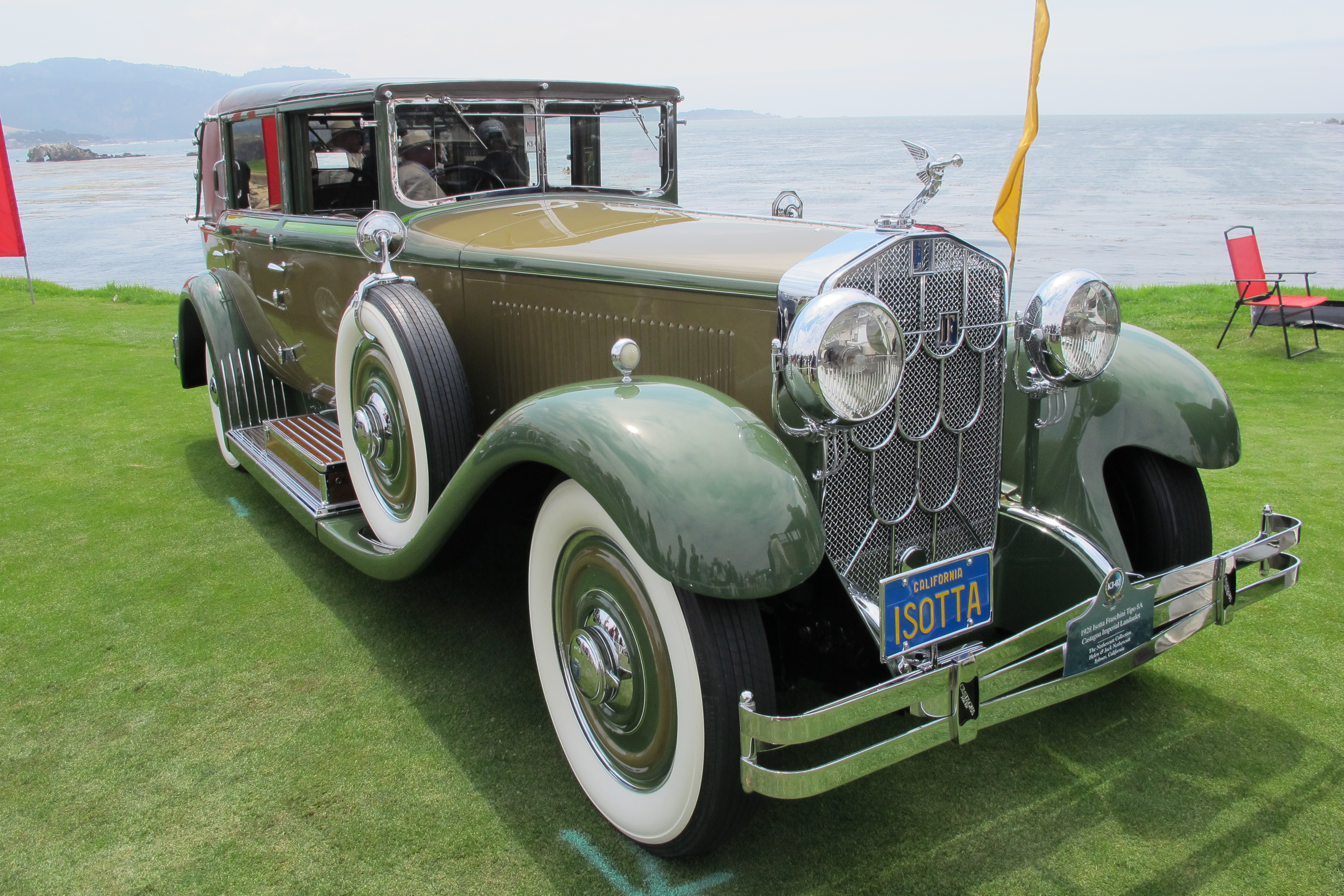
Tipo 8A Castagna Imperial Landaulet (1928)

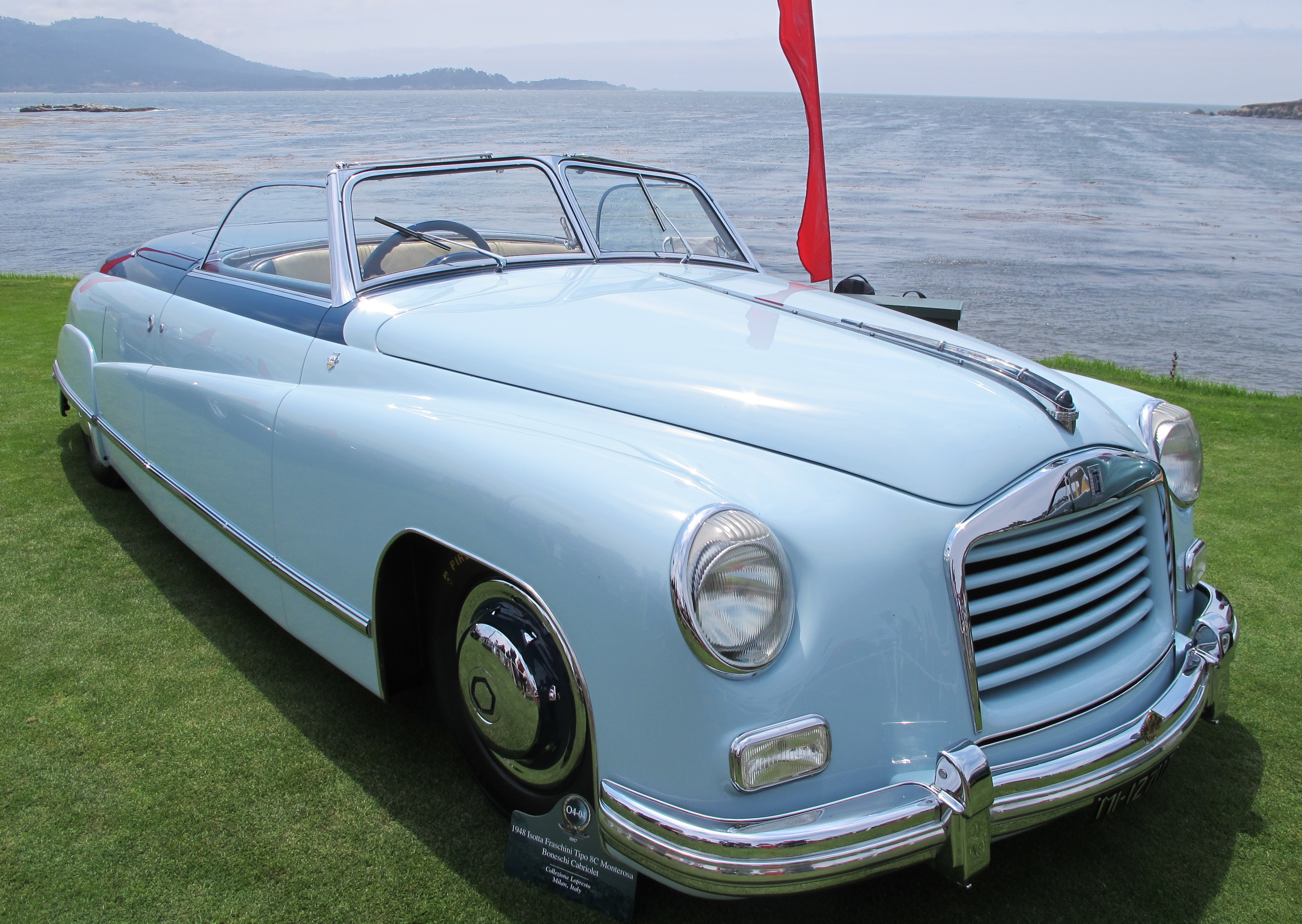
Tipo 8C Monterosa Boneschi Cabriolet Prototype (1948)

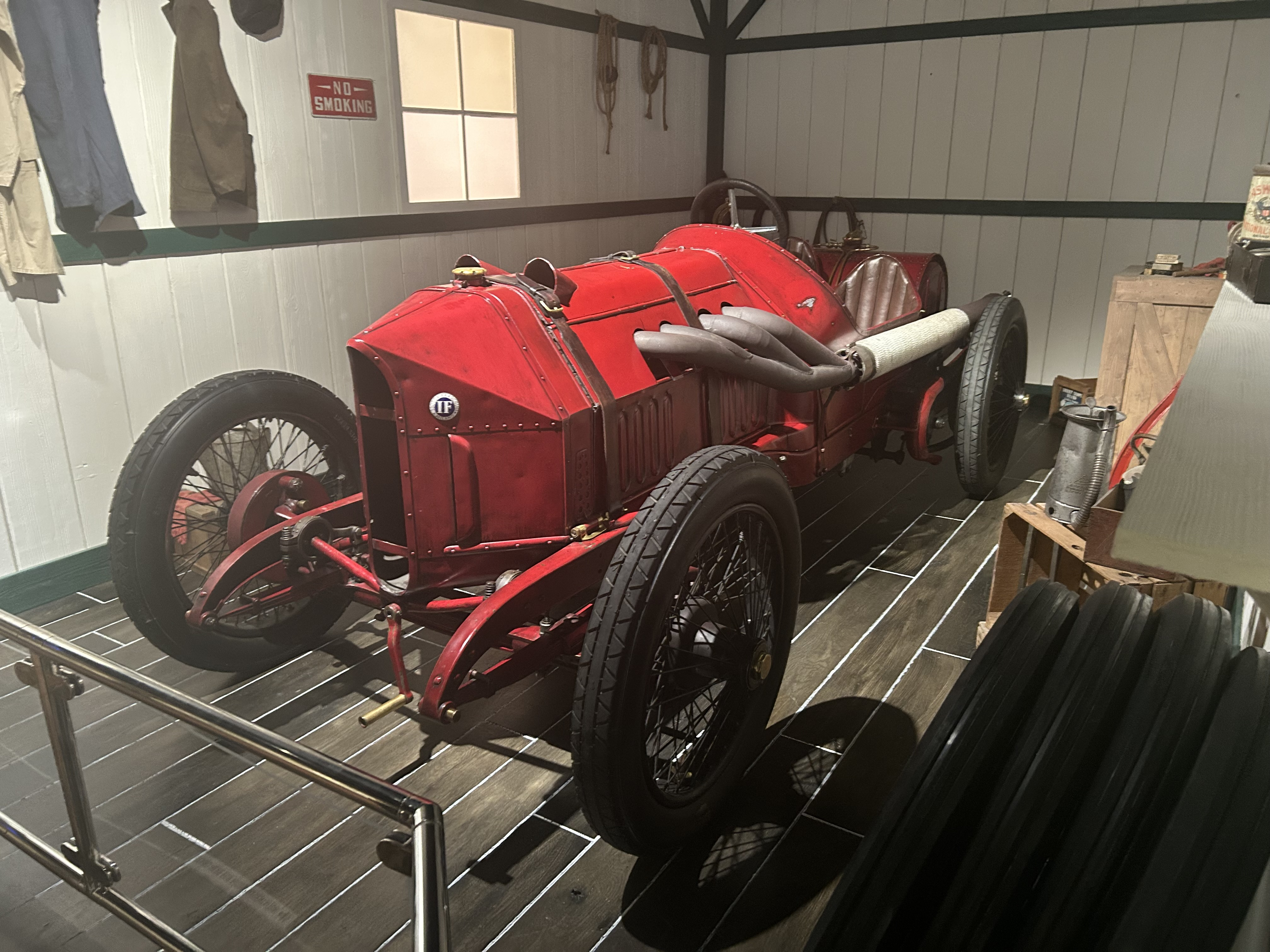
Isotta Fraschini Tipo IM (1914)

== See also ==
- Caproni
- Compagnia Nazionale Aeronautica
- Reggiane
