= Cesare Sala =

Italian coachbuilding company

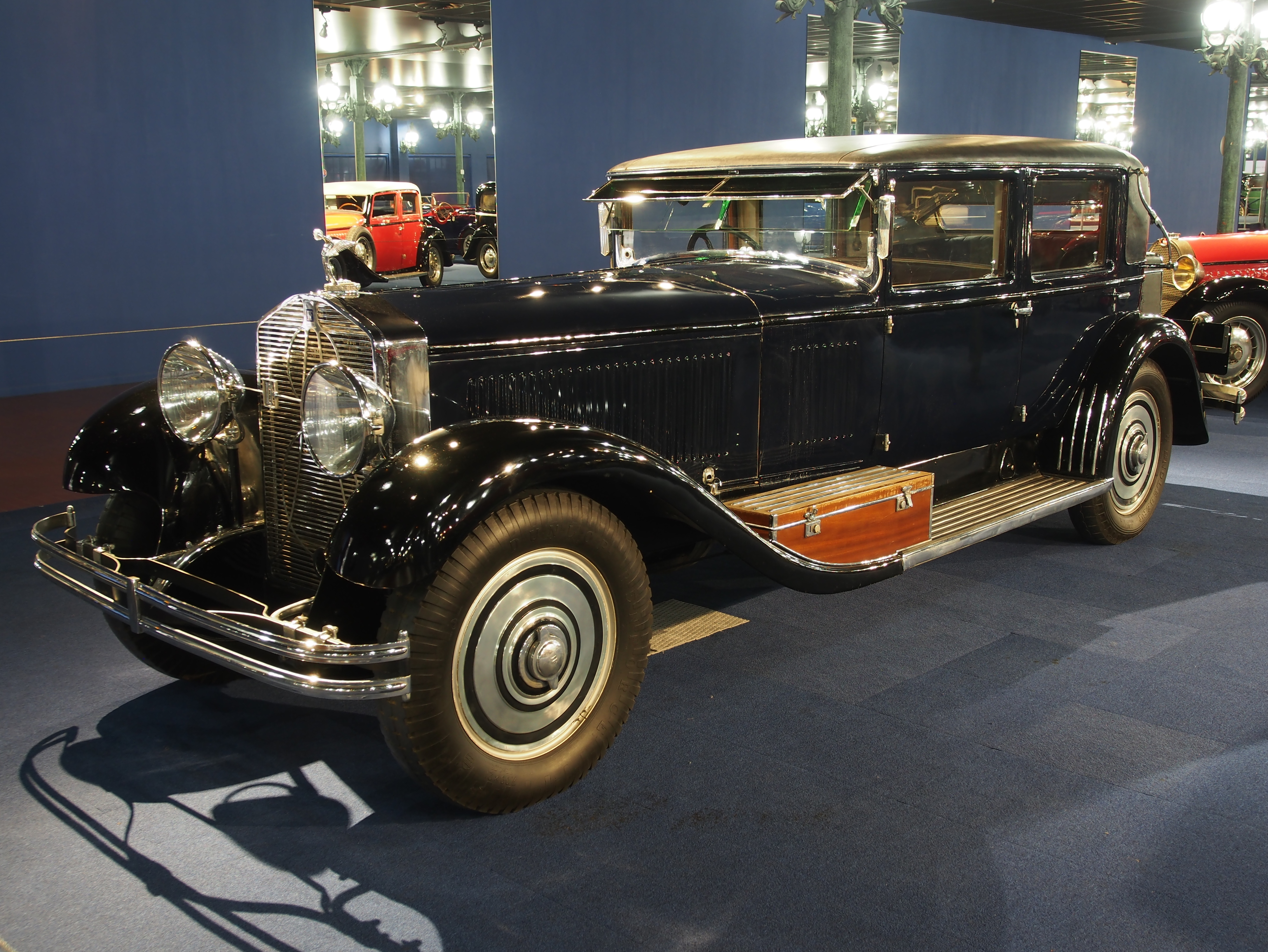
1928 Isotta Fraschini Tipo 8A Laundalet by Sala

Carrozzeria Italiana Cesare Sala was a Milan-based coachbuilder. They provided carriages for the Vienna court and bodies for Isotta Fraschini automobiles.

== History ==
The company was founded in Milan in the mid-19th century and initially manufactured carriages. Under the second company name, automobile bodies were presented at an exhibition for the first time in 1897. They primarily built bodies for Isotta Fraschini automobiles, as well as a handful for Alfa Romeos, Lancias, Fiats, and others. The second name change took place in 1905. The effects of the global economic crisis of 1929 caused problems and production ended in 1932.
