= Carrozzeria Boneschi =

Italian coachbuilder

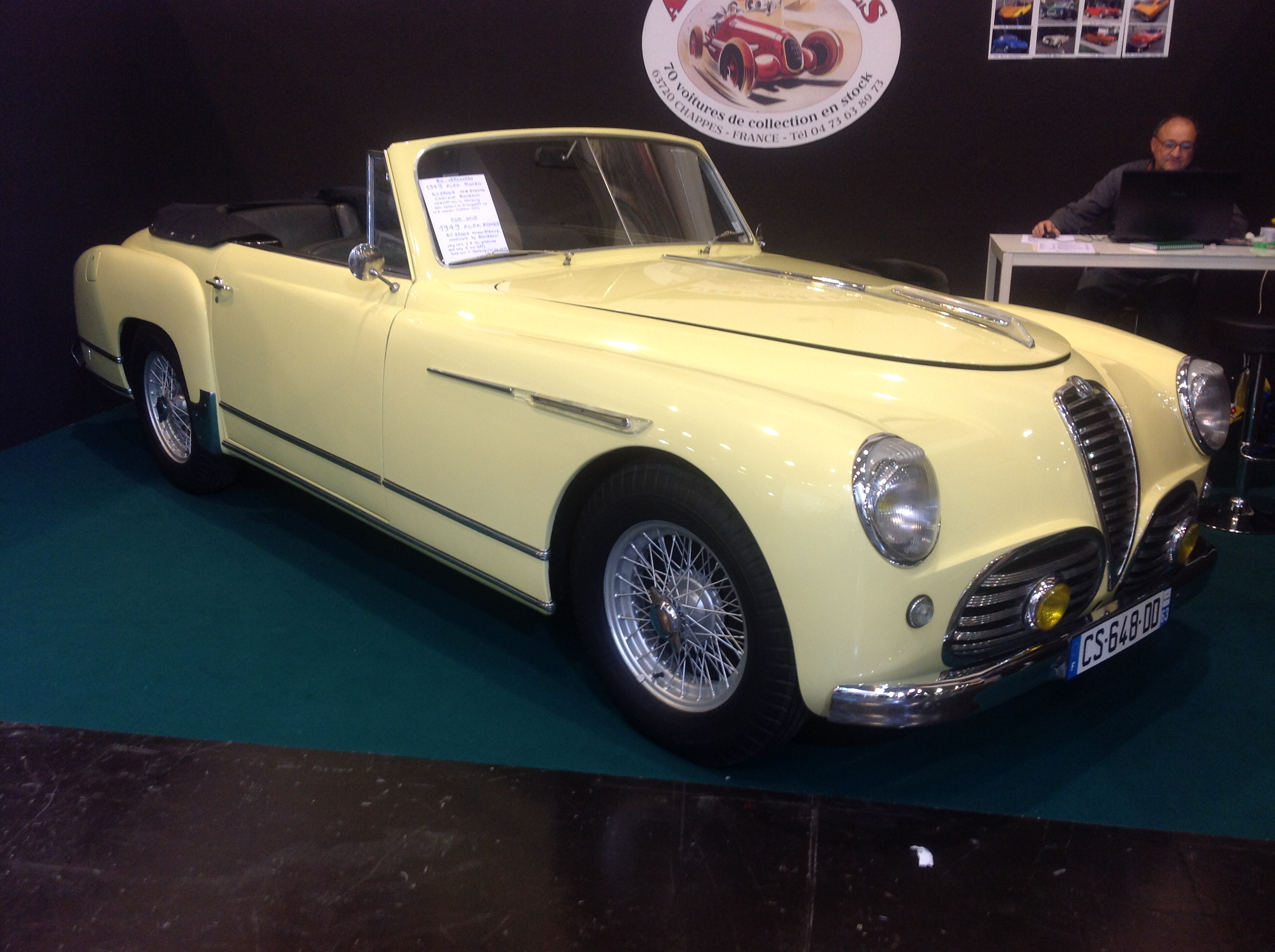
Alfa Romeo 6C 2500 Cabriolet

Carrozzeria Boneschi S.r.L. (established 1919 near Milan) is an Italian coachbuilder, mainly of commercial vehicles. Until 1960, the company was mostly involved with automobile manufacturers such as Talbot, Rolls-Royce, Alfa Romeo, Lancia and Fiat. It was established in Milan by Giovanni Boneschi, moving to Cambiago in (1933). The factory was rebuilt after World War II (1946), after which Boneschi died. Among its designers and directors in the later years was Dr. Bruno Pezzaglia. Boneschi brand has recently been acquired by the coachbuilder Savio.

== Vehicles ==
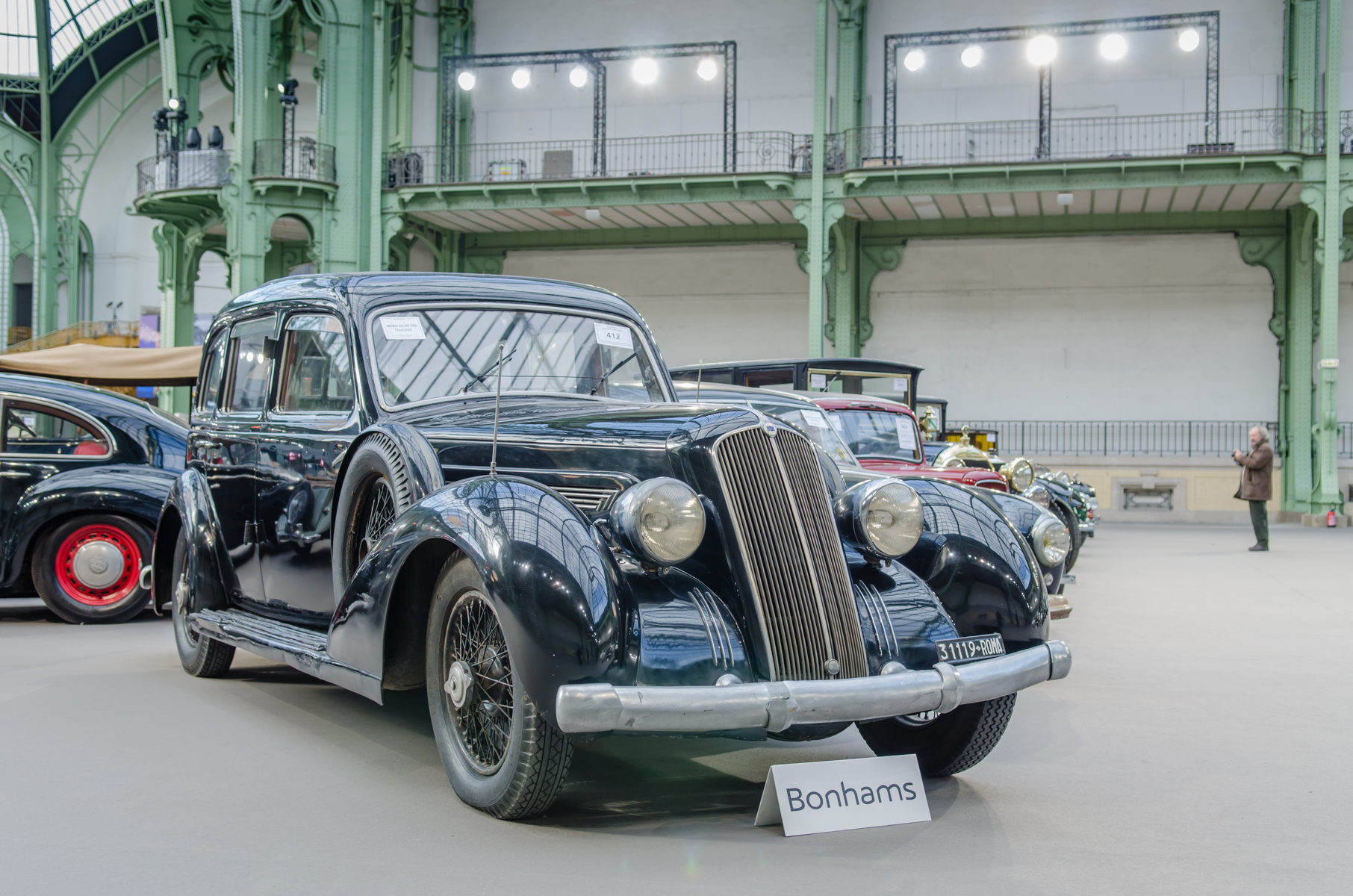
1936 Lancia Astura Ministeriale

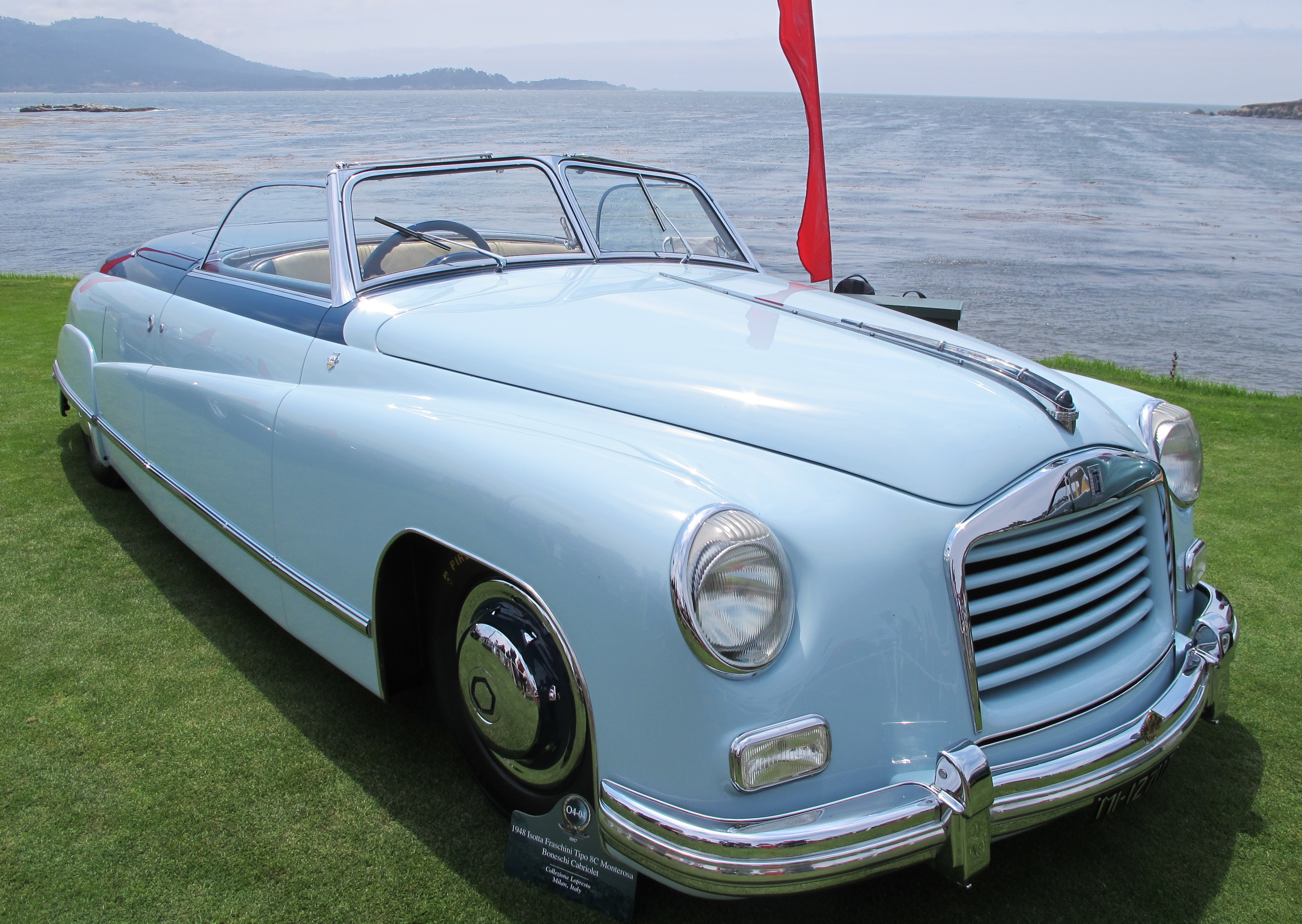
Isotta Fraschini Tipo 8C Monterosa Cabriolet Prototype by Boneschi

- Lancia Lambda were the first orders
- Lancia Dilambda, Lancia Artena and Lancia Astura
- Lancia Aprilia
- Fiat 1100/103 Giardinetta (wood-based station wagon, 1949) and the Pubblicigario, toothpaste shaped car for Binaca (toothpaste manufacturer, 1951)
- Alfa Romeo 6C 2500 convertible (1937, 1952)
- Isotta Fraschini Tipo 8C Monterosa Cabriolet (1948)
- Alfa Romeo 1900C Astral (1953), displayed at the 1953 Turin Motor Show, a second was sold to Rafael Trujillo.
- Lancia Aurelia B53 convertible (1953)
- Alfa Romeo Giulietta Weekendina (station wagon, 1957)
- Fiat 1500 Spider Bonetto, designed by Rodolfo Bonetto (1960)
- Lancia Flaminia spider Amalfi (1961)
- O.S.C.A. 1600 GT Swift, two different designs in 1962 and 1963
- Maserati 3500 GT Tight (1962, 1963)
- Alfa Romeo 2600 Spider Studionove (1963)
- Ford Fairlane prototype (1963)
- Iveco OM55, armored truck (1977)
- Fiat 306 bus, conversion for Gancia Asti
- Lancia Thema Gazella coupe prototype (1987)
- U.S. patent 3,797,880 (1972)
