= Isotta Fraschini T8 and T12 =

Isotta Fraschini T8 Coupé

Overview
- Manufacturer: Isotta Fraschini SpA
- Model years: 1996
- Assembly: Cervere, Italy
- Designer: Tom Tjaarda

Body and chassis
- Class: Luxury
- Body style: 2 door convertible 2 door coupe
- Layout: Front-engine, four-wheel-drive

Powertrain
- Engine: Audi 4172cc 32-valve V8
- Transmission: Automatic Tiptronic

Dimensions
- Length: 4530 mm
- Width: 1890 mm
- Height: 1380 mm

Chronology
- Predecessor: 1947-1949 Isotta Fraschini Tipo 8C Monterosa
- Successor: 1998 Isotta Fraschini T12 Coupé

Isotta Fraschini T12 Coupé

Overview
- Manufacturer: Isotta Fraschini SpA
- Model years: 1998
- Assembly: Cervere, Italy
- Designer: Tom Tjaarda

Body and chassis
- Class: Luxury
- Body style: 2 door convertible 2 door coupe
- Layout: Front-engine, four-wheel-drive

Powertrain
- Engine: V12

Dimensions
- Length: 4530 mm
- Width: 1890 mm
- Height: 1380 mm

Chronology
- Predecessor: 1996 Isotta Fraschini T8 Coupé

The Isotta Fraschini T8 and T12 are Italian concept cars revealed in 1996 and 1998 respectively as an attempt by Isotta Fraschini to resurrect their prestigious luxury automotive brand name of the early 20th century.

== Attempted Resurrection of Isotta Fraschini Cars ==
Popularity of Isotta Fraschini cars grew in the 1920s. The firm started out importing French cars to Italy in 1900, but by 1907 had begun making their own cars. With the exception of an attempt to get back into cars in the late 1940s, they focused on trucks (until the 1960s) and marine engines. After a pause that lasted nearly half a century, Isotta Fraschini returned to the passenger car world in 1996 with the T8 concept, and followed up in 1998 with the T12 concept. However, neither cars were put into production, and the firm went into bankruptcy in 1999. The company kept in other businesses and is currently represented by two subjects: Isotta Fraschini Milano, s.r.l. (luxury goods) and Isotta Fraschini Motori S.p.A. (marine, industrial and rail traction engines).

== T8 Coupé ==
The number 8 is recurrent in the brand. Their last model was the 1947-1949 Isotta Fraschini Tipo 8C Monterosa which barely reached prototype. The Isotta Fraschini T8 is an aluminum bodied 2+2 Spider, but available with a hard-top, and was first publicly seen at the 1996 Geneva Motor Show. Production would have been undertaken at an-ex military weapons plant in Southern Italy but nothing materialized. Late in 2000 the remaining hardware was sold off.

=== Drivetrain ===
The Isotta Fraschini T8 concept used Audi A8 mechanicals, including four-wheel-drive and the same 4172cc 32-valve V8 engine.

== T12 Coupé ==
The Isotta Fraschini T12, like the T8, is an aluminium bodied, 4-wheel drive 2+2 Spider, available with a hard-top. It was first unveiled in 1998.

=== Drivetrain ===
The T12 Coupé had a V12 engine with 400 hp. at 6000rpm, vented disc brakes, and 4 wheel drive.
