= Isotta Fraschini Astro 7 =

1930s Italian aircraft piston engine

Astro 7
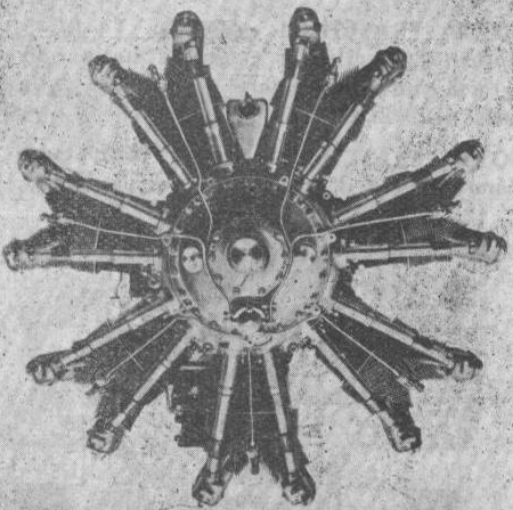
- Front view of Isotta Fraschini Astro 7
- Type: 7-cylinder engine
- National origin: Italy
- Manufacturer: Fabrica Automobili Isotta Fraschini (Isotta Fraschini), Milan

The Astro 7 was a seven-cylinder radial aircraft engine built by Isotta Fraschini in the 1930s.

== Design and development ==
Fabrica Automobili Isotta Fraschini (Isotta Fraschini) was founded in 1898 to manufacture cars and internal combustion engines. Isotta Fraschini engines powered many Italian airships and military aircraft during World War I, becoming one of the largest engine producers in Italy. At the outbreak of World War II Isotta Fraschini had a large portfolio of engines but suffered from a lack of large orders, with a few exceptions. The Astro 7 C seven-cylinder radial engine failed to attract orders in any quantity and failed to give the company significant return on the development costs.

The Astro 7 C was an unremarkable air-cooled radial engine with supercharger, which did allow reasonable power to be maintained at altitudes up to 4,000 m (13,000 ft), dependent on supercharger drive ratio. With few applications the Astro 7 C family was not produced in large quantities.

== Variants ==
Data from:Jane's All the World's Aircraft 1938, Jane's All the World's Aircraft 1937

Astro 7 C.20
Rated power of 370 kW (500 hp) at 2,000 rpm at 2,000 m (6,600 ft)
Astro 7 C.21
Rated power of 340 kW (460 hp) at 2,000 rpm at 2,100 m (6,900 ft)
Astro 7 C.40
Rated power of 330 kW (440 hp) at 2,000 rpm at 4,000 m (13,000 ft)

== Applications ==
- Caproni Ca.406A (intended)

== Specifications (Astro 7 C.20) ==
Data from Jane's All the World's Aircraft 1938, and Jane's All the World's Aircraft 1937.

=== General characteristics ===
- Type: 7-cylinder air-cooled radial piston engine
- Bore: 155 mm (6.10 in)
- Stroke: 160 mm (6.30 in)
- Displacement: 20.8 L (1,269.3 cu in)
- Length: 1,127 mm (44.4 in)
- Diameter: 1,200 mm (47.2 in)
- Dry weight: 328 kg (723 lb)

=== Components ===
- Valvetrain: 2 x overhead valves per cylinder driven by pushrods and rockers
- Supercharger: 7.7:1 crankshaft speed
- Fuel system: Isotta Fraschini L.95.I inverted carburetor with automatic height control and centrifugal regulator boost control
- Oil system: pressure system with dry sump and scavenge pump
- 2 x Marelli MF.7 magnetos with automatic advance
- Compressed air starter

=== Performance ===
- Power output:

- 310 kW (420 hp) at 1,900 rpm for 5 minutes (take-off)
- 370 kW (500 hp) at 2,000 rpm at 2,100 m (6,890 ft) (rated)

- Compression ratio: 6:1

== See also ==
Comparable engines

- Bristol Neptune

Related lists

- List of aircraft engines
