= Isotta Fraschini V.5 =

- Type: Eight-cylinder water-cooled inline aircraft engine
- National origin: Italy
- Manufacturer: Isotta Fraschini
- First run: 1915

The Isotta Fraschini V.5 of 1916 was an Italian eight-cylinder, water-cooled, in-line piston aero engine of World War I. The "V" denoted "Volo" or "flight" rather than piston arrangement.

== Design ==
The V.5's construction was fairly typical of aircraft engines of the period with cast-iron cylinders mounted in pairs with common heads and water jackets. It had much in common with the six-cylinder Isotta Fraschini V.4 and was built at a similar time. Though powerful, it was very heavy and thus, like some other Isotta Fraschini engines, better suited to airships than aircraft.

== Applications ==
- Forlanini airship

== Specifications ==
Data from Jane's Fighting Aircraft of World War I (2001)

=== General characteristics ===
- Type: 8-cylinder inline
- Bore: 130 mm (5.12 in)
- Stroke: 180 mm (7.09 in)
- Displacement: 19 L (1,165 cu in)
- Length: 1,990 mm (78.3 in)
- Width: 600 mm (23.6 in)
- Height: 1,010 mm (39.8 in)
- Dry weight: 351 kg (774 lb)

=== Components ===
- Valvetrain: Overhead camshaft
- Fuel system: Twin carburettors, twin eight spark magnetos
- Oil system: Forced feed
- Cooling system: water; cast-iron cylinders in pairs, each pair in a steel water jacket
- Reduction gear: direct

=== Performance ===
- Power output: 183 kW (245 hp) at 1,400 rpm
