= Isotta Fraschini Tipo D =

Overview
- Manufacturer: Isotta Fraschini
- Production: 2 (est.)
- Model years: 1905
- Assembly: Milan, Italy
- Designer: Giuseppe Stefanini

Body and chassis
- Class: race car

Powertrain
- Engine: 17.2 liter ohv ohc inline 4

Chronology
- Successor: 1908 Isotta Fraschini Tipo FE

The 1905 Isotta Fraschini Tipo D was an early Italian race car with a 120 hp, 17.2 liter overhead valve, overhead cam four cylinder engine.

== History ==
The Tipo D and its gigantic 17.2 liter overhead valve overhead cam four cylinder engine were designed by Italian automotive pioneer Giuseppe “Cou de Ram” (Red Head) Stefanini, who had designed the first car Cesare Isotta had built in collaboration with the Fraschini brothers a few years before. Stefanini was responsible for the design of all Isotta Fraschini chassis until around 1906, though after that he was increasingly overshadowed by Giustino Cattaneo, who would go on do design the firms most famous luxury cars. Stefanini retained his connection with the company for several more years.

== Racing ==
In September 1905 two Isotta Fraschini Tipo Ds with drivers Le Blon and Trucco were entered in the Gran Premio di Brescia, a three-lap road race round a 104-mile circuit in which both failed to get very far.
