= Isotta Fraschini Tipo 8A =

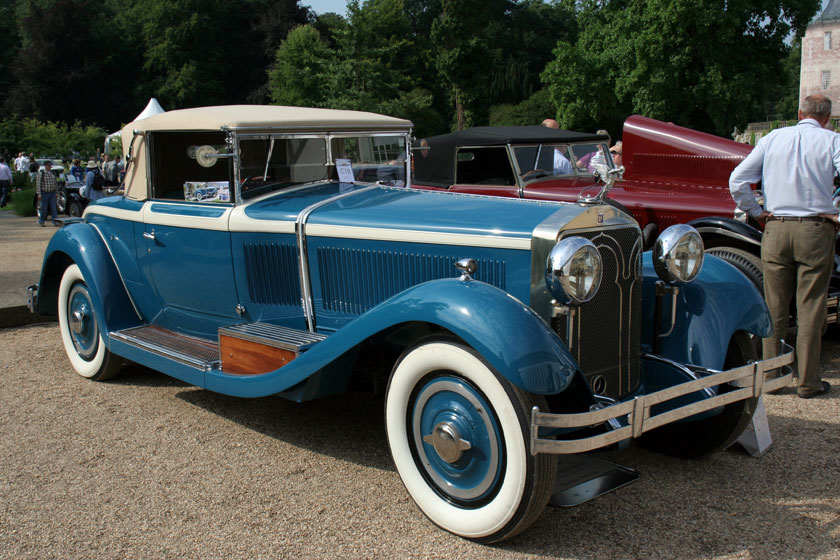

Overview
- Manufacturer: Isotta Fraschini
- Production: 1924–1931; 950 produced

Body and chassis
- Class: Luxury car
- Layout: FR layout

Powertrain
- Engine: 7,370 cc (449.7 cu in) I8
- Transmission: 3-speed manual

Dimensions
- Wheelbase: 145 in (3,683 mm); 134 in (3,404 mm) (S/SS)

Chronology
- Predecessor: Isotta Fraschini Tipo 8
- Successor: Isotta Fraschini Tipo 8B

The Isotta Fraschini Tipo 8A is a luxury car made by the Italian manufacturer Isotta Fraschini from 1924 until 1931. It was the successor to the Tipo 8 model, with a new 7.3-litre straight-eight engine to replace the 5.9-litre unit used in the previous model. This new engine could produce 115–160 PS (85–118 kW). This was the most powerful mass-produced straight-8 engine in the world at that time. The Tipo 8A was offered only with bare chassis and engine for the coachbuilders.

The Isotta Fraschini car company promised that every car could do 150 km/h (93 mph). The car was very luxurious and it cost more than a Model J Duesenberg. Around one third of these cars were sold in the United States. The characteristic car body was made by Swiss manufacturer Carrosserie Worblaufen.

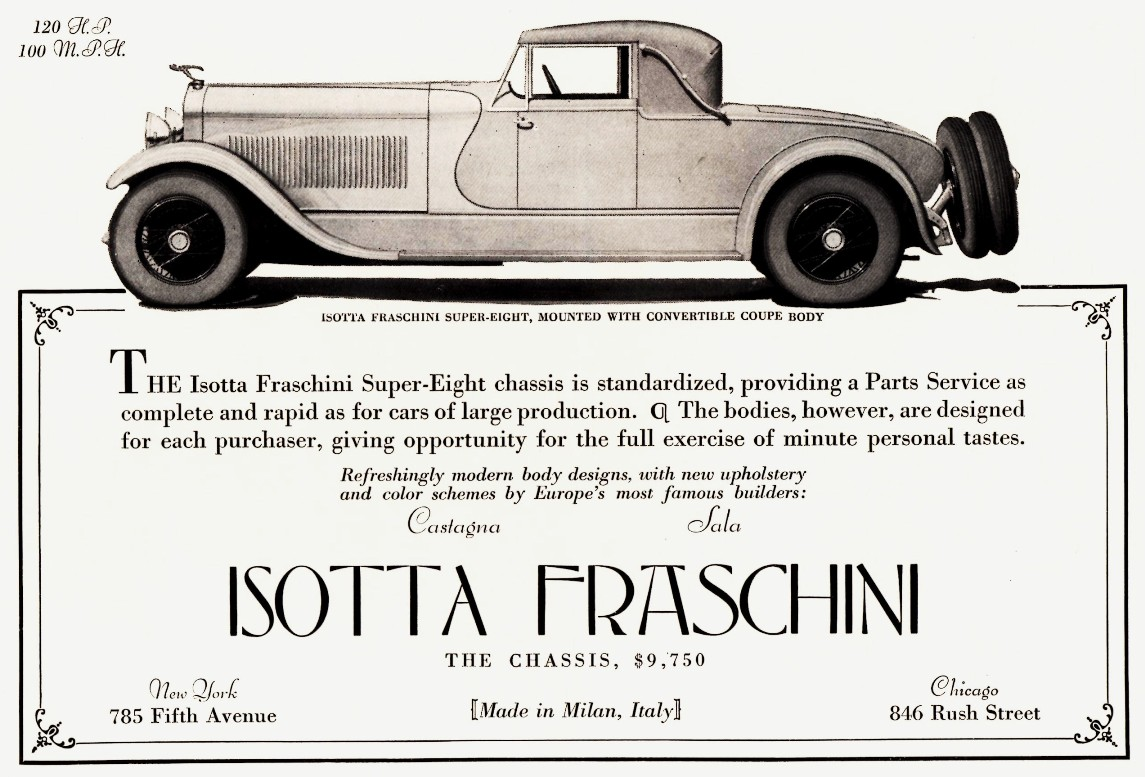
1928 Isotta Fraschini Tipo 8A half page ad

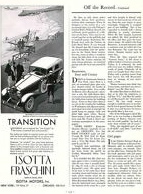
1930 Isotta Fraschini Tipo 8A ad

== Drivetrain ==
The Tipo 8A's inline 8-cylinder engine displacement was up to 7.4 litres, with overhead valves and cam — and like its predecessor, the Tipo 8, there was no external intake manifold, the twin carburetors being attached directly to the block. Transmission was a three-speed manual. The 8ASS (Super Sprint) package was also an option.

== On today's market ==
In 2012, a barn find of an unrestored 1931 Isotta-Fraschini Tipo 8A with Lancefield Faux-Cabriolet 2-door coachwork was publicly offered for the first time since 1961 and fetched $186,500. In March 2013 a restored 1929 Isotta-Fraschini Tipo 8A with Convertible Sedan coachwork by Floyd-Derham sold for $473,000.

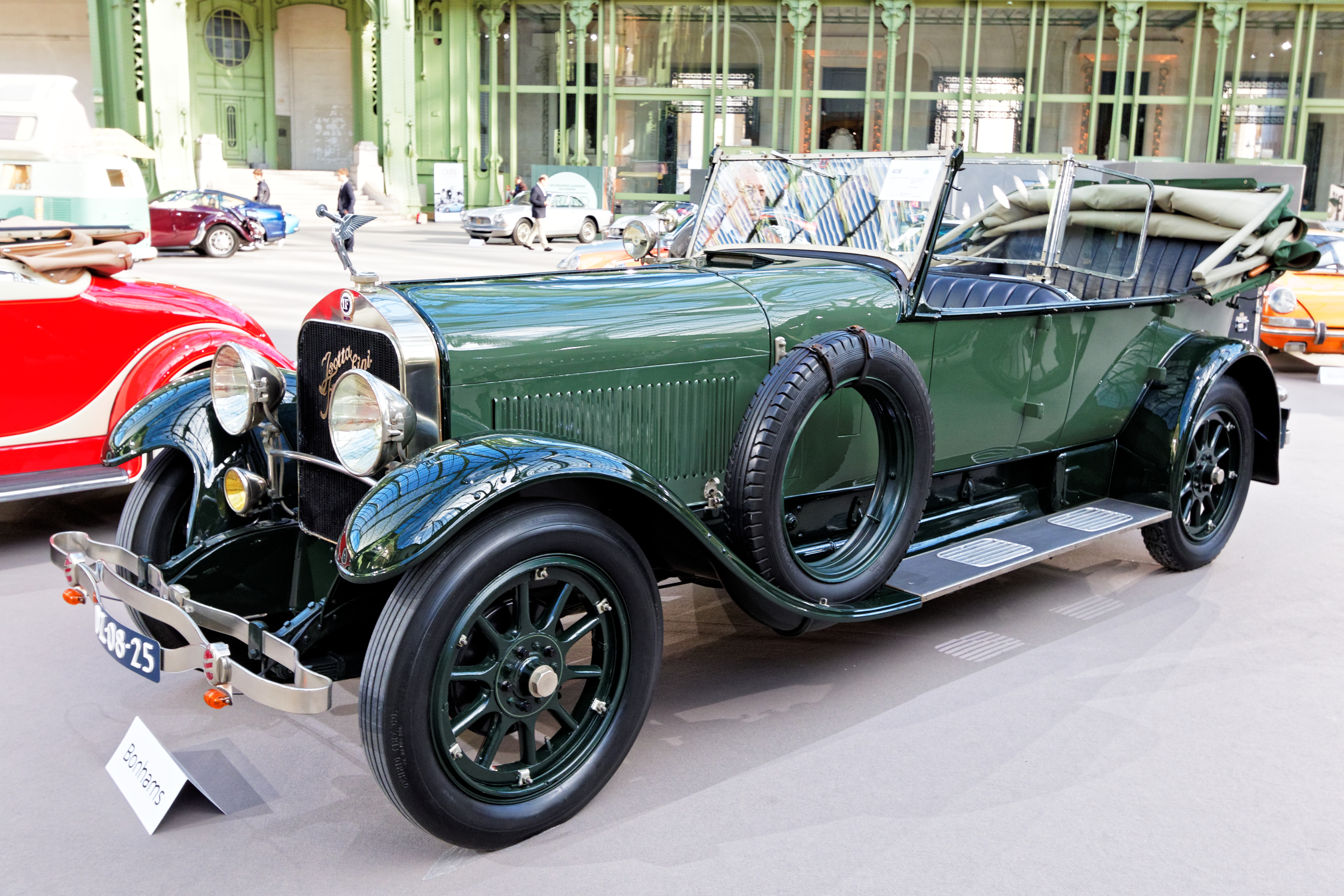
1926 Isotta Fraschini Tipo 8A Torpedo deux pare-brise

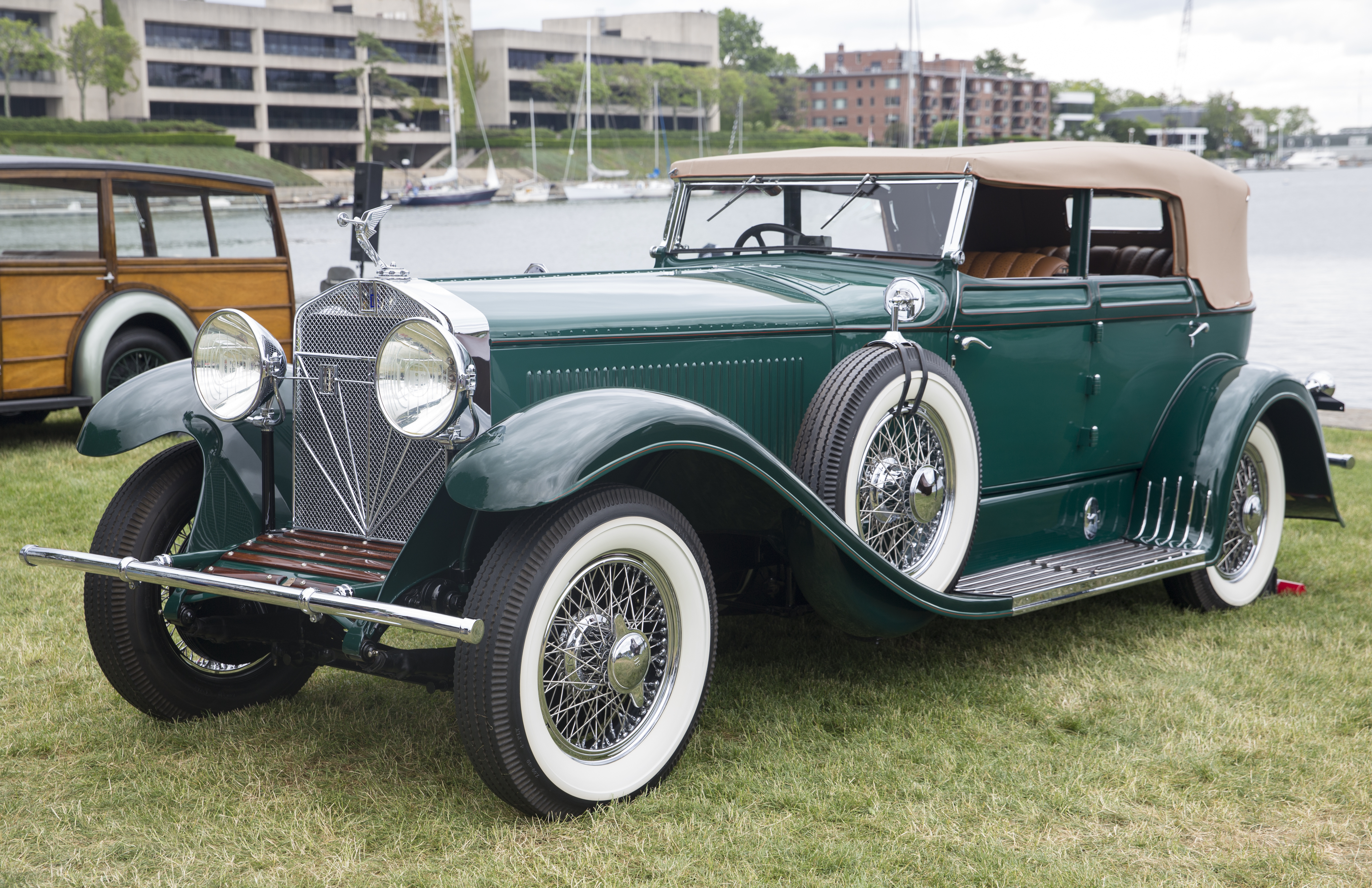
1929 Isotta Fraschini Tipo 8A Convertible Sedan by Floyd-Derham

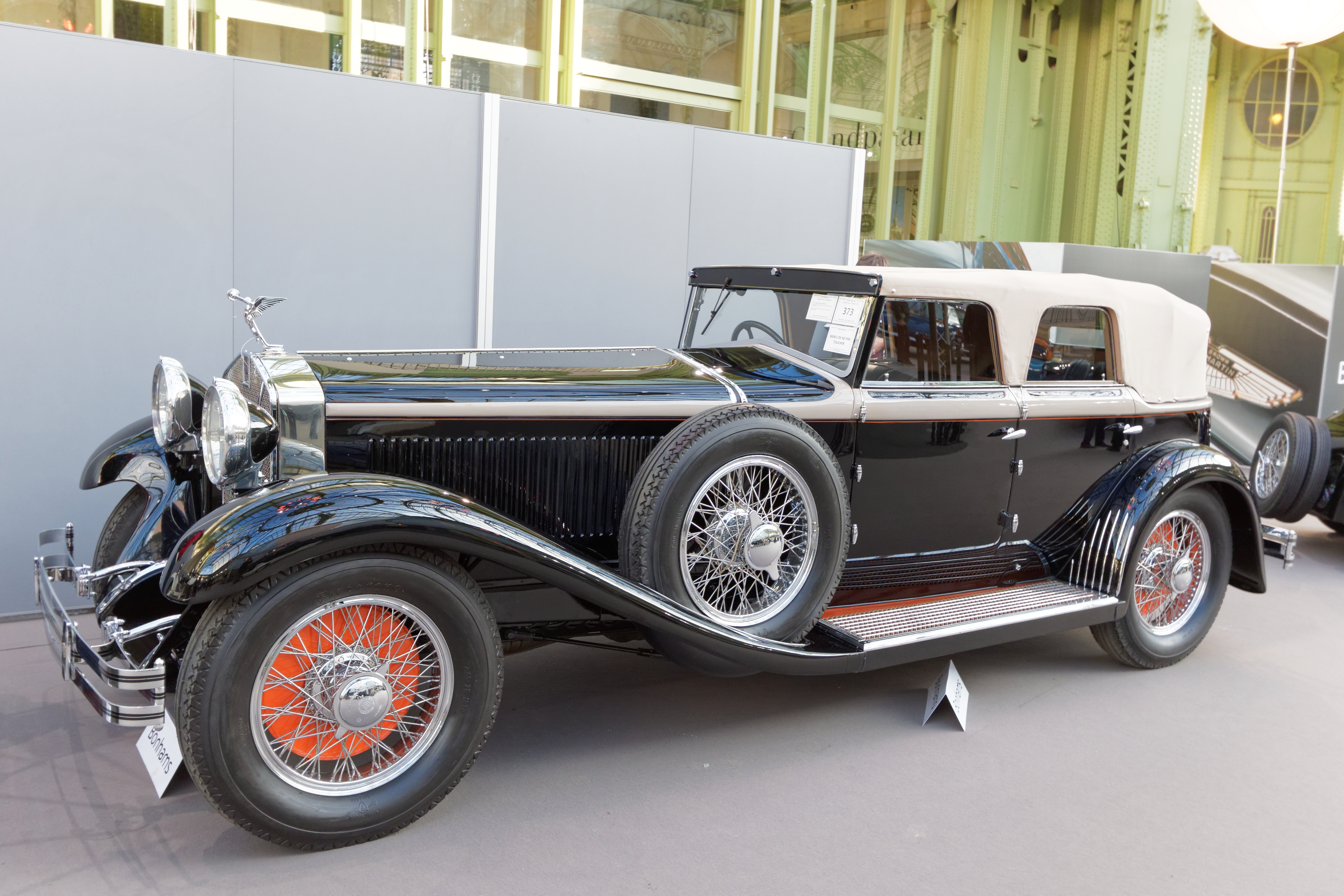
1930 Isotta Fraschini 8A SS Cabriolet

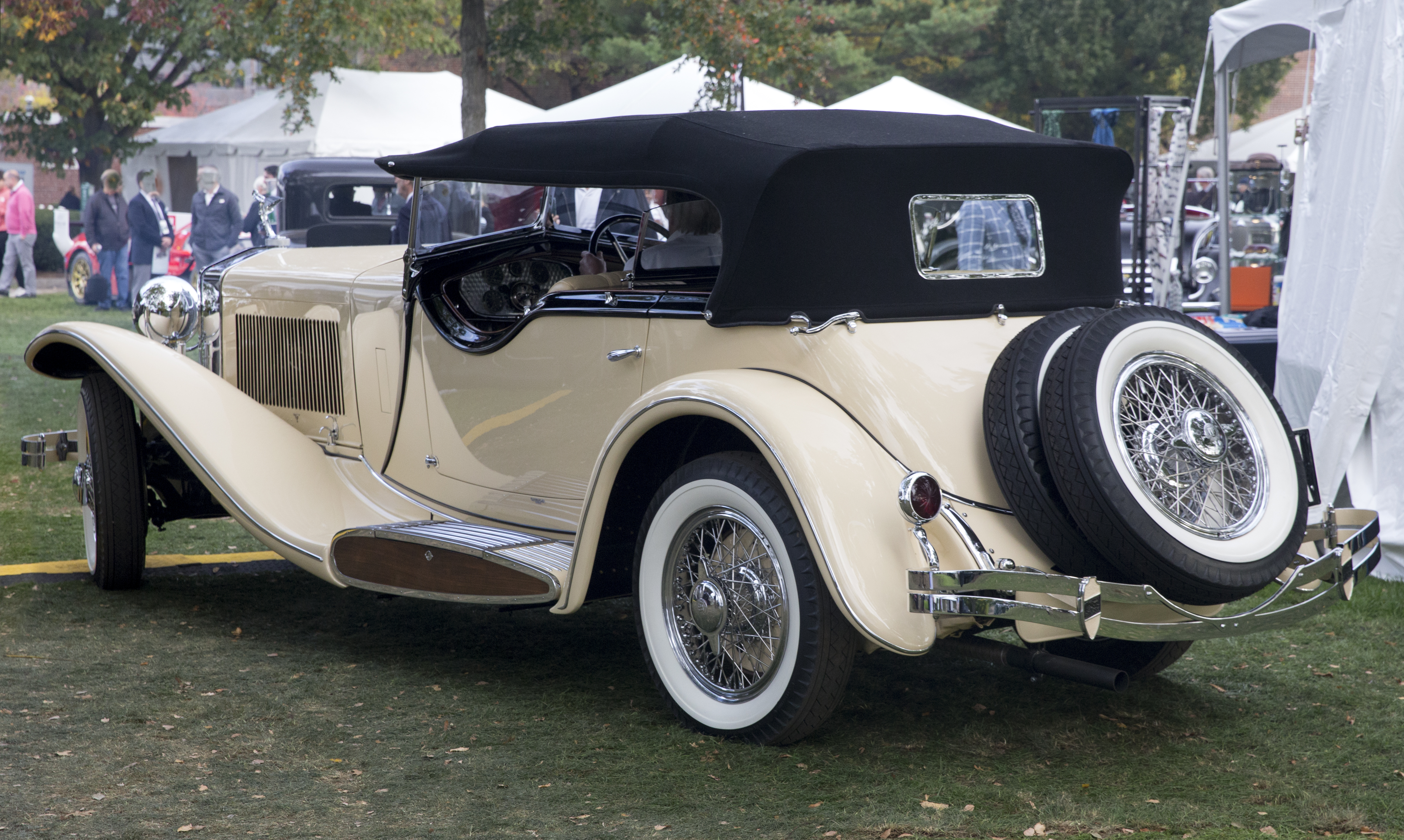
1933 Isotta Fraschini Tipo 8A SS 2-Door Sports Tourer by Castagna (rear)

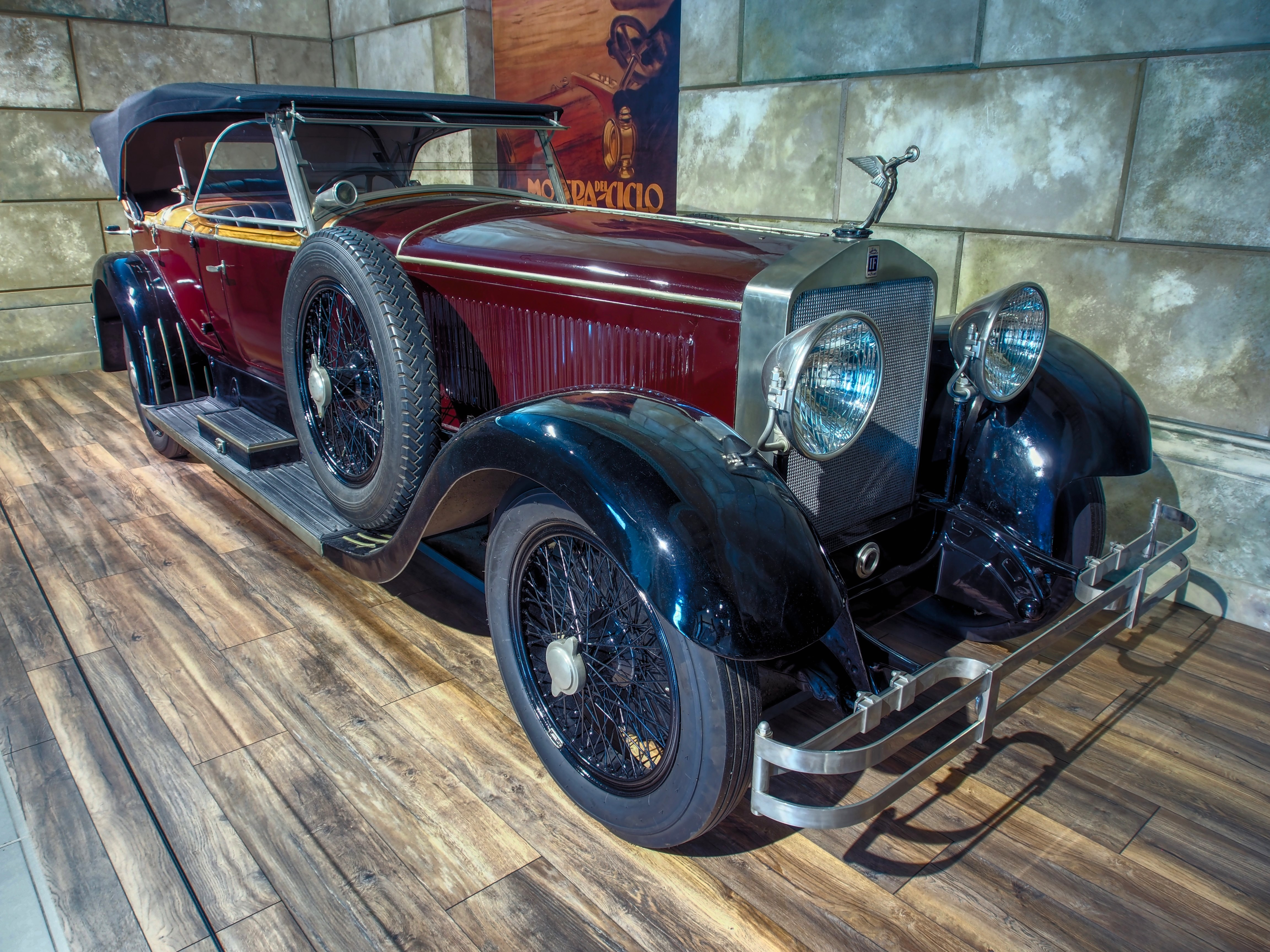
Isotta Fraschini Tipo 8A Van Rijswijk Dual-Cowl Phaeton

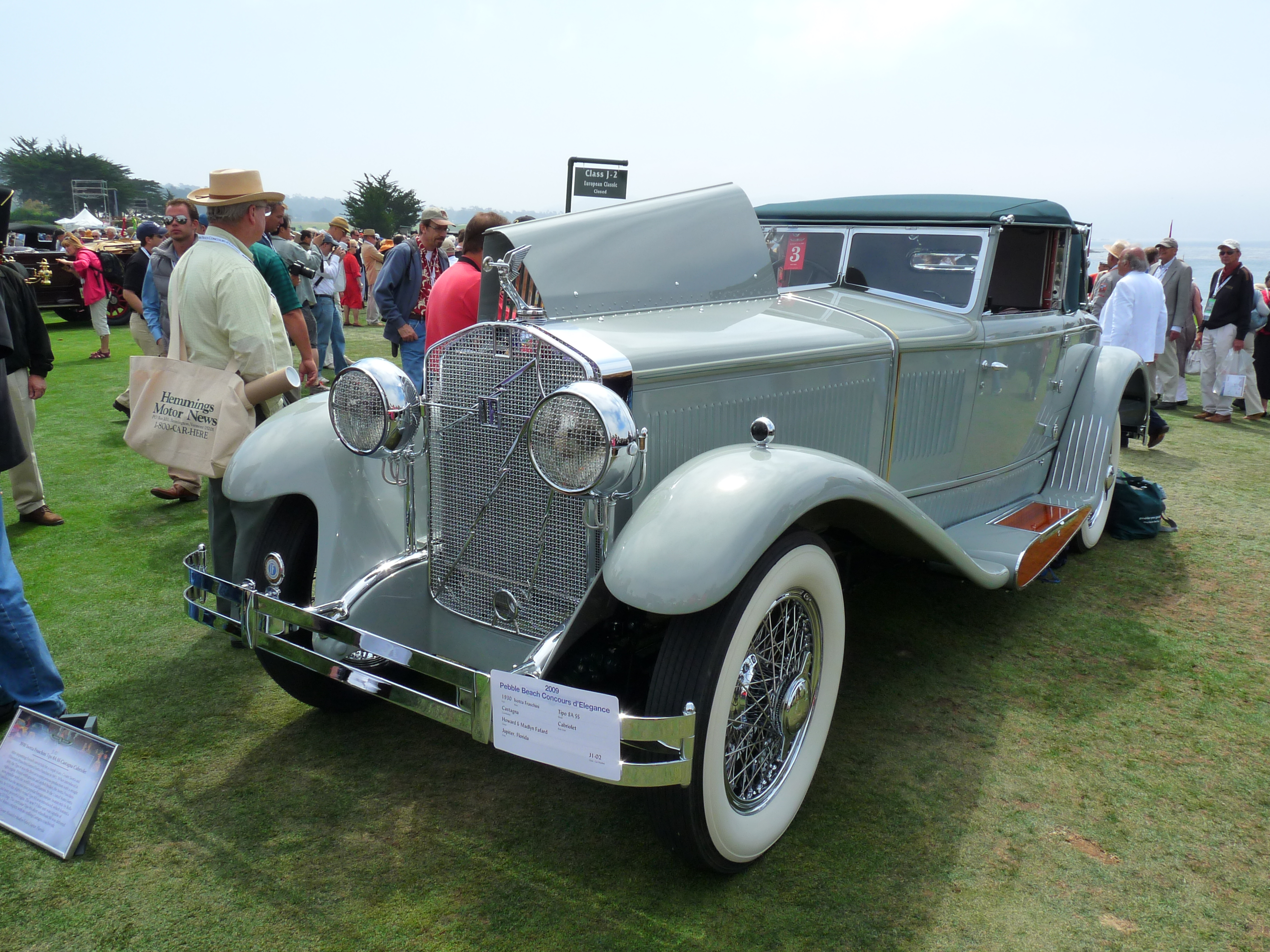
1930 Isotta-Fraschini Tipo 8A Spinto Castagna boattail-cabriolet

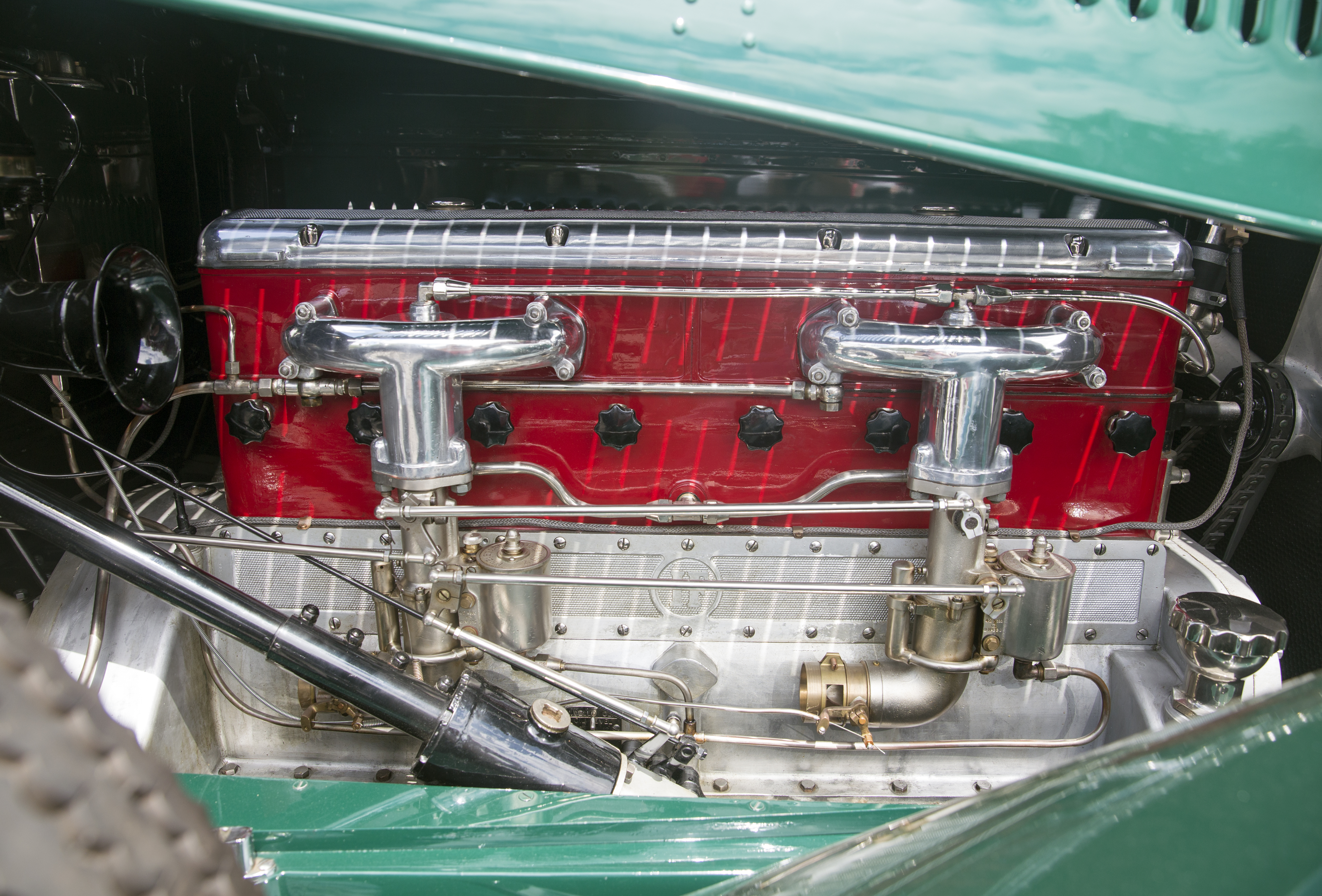
The engine of a 1929 Tipo 8A

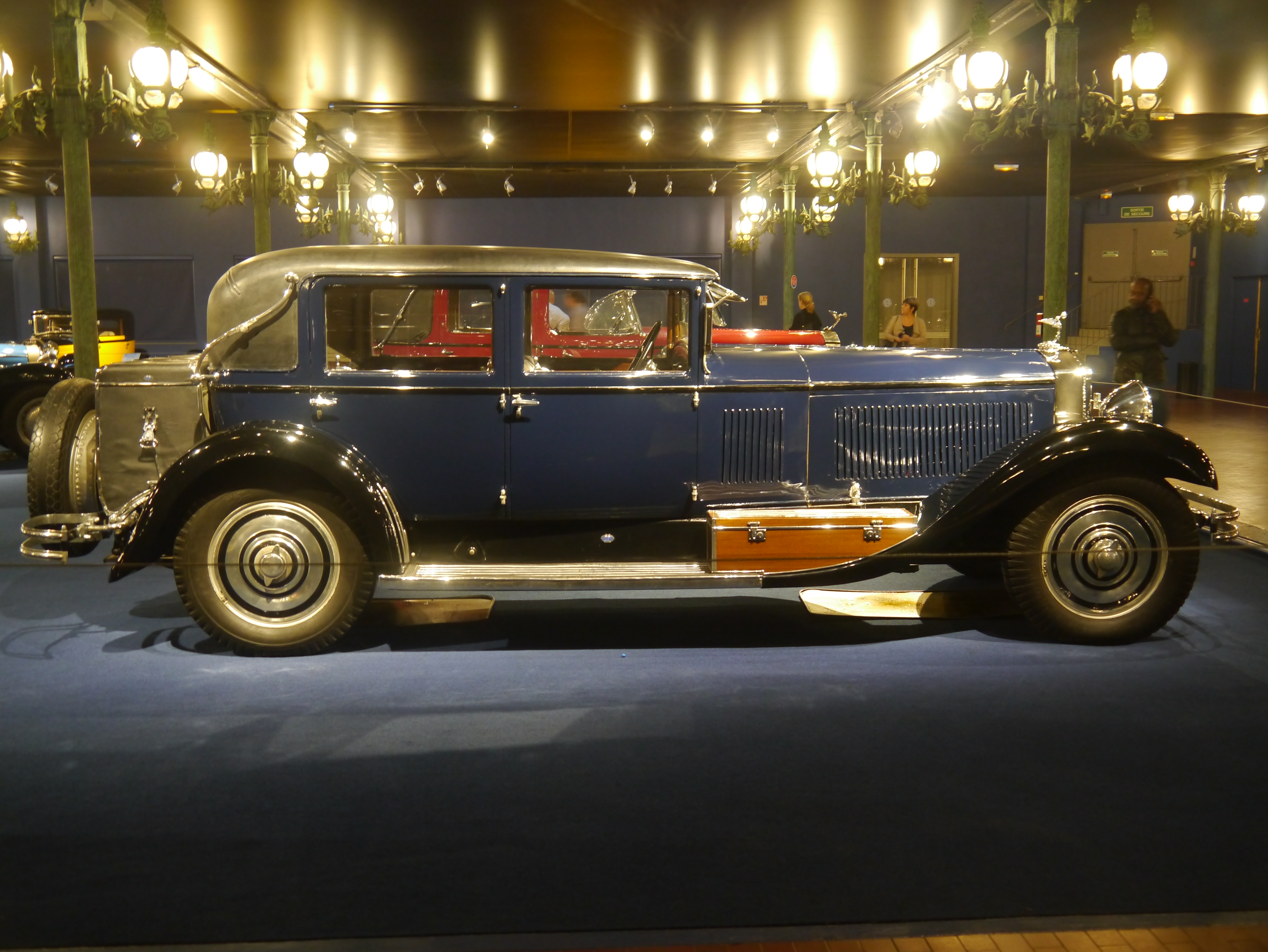
1925 Isotta-Fraschini Type 8 A Sala "Faux-Cabriolet" berline

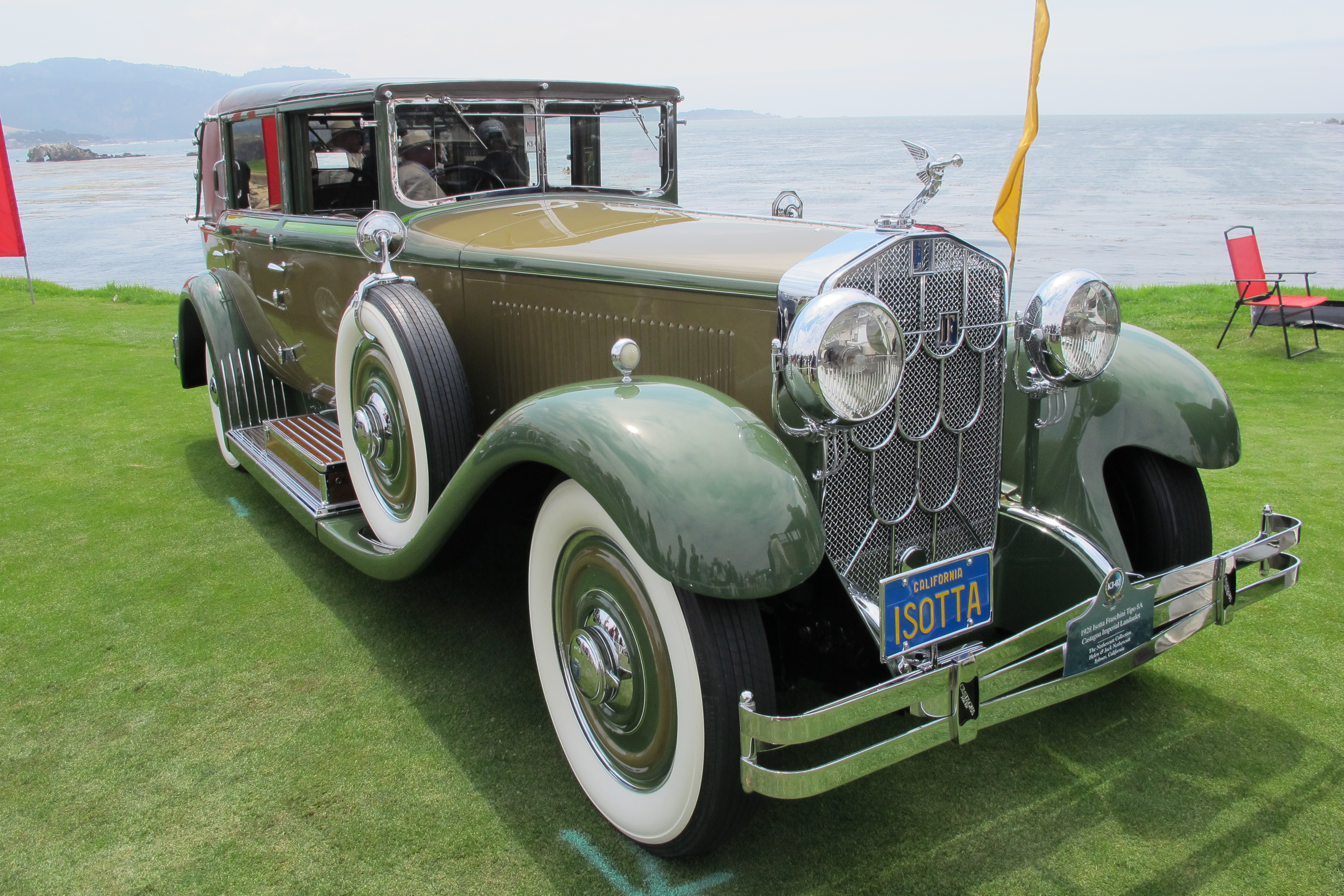
1928 Isotta-Fraschini Tipo 8A Castagna Imperial Landaulet

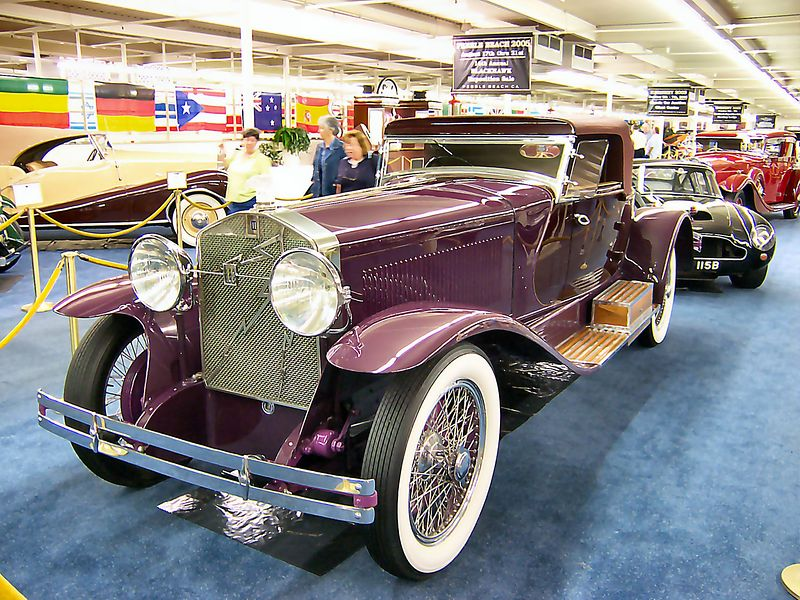
Isotta-Fraschini Tipo 8A S LeBaron Boattail Roadster

== In Sunset Boulevard ==
A 1929 landaulet limousine example of the car with "coupé de ville" bodywork by Castagna of Milan is featured in the 1950 film Sunset Boulevard as the car of lead character Norma Desmond, a forgotten silent movie star who in the film says

...we have a car. Not one of those cheap things made of chromium and spit but Isotta Fraschini. Have you ever heard of Isotta Fraschini? All hand-made. It cost me twenty-eight thousand dollars.

(Adjusted for inflation, and assuming she bought the car in 1929, $28,000 would be equivalent to $512,736 in 2024.) William Holden as Joe Gillis, an unsuccessful screenwriter said, telling the story, "The whole thing was upholstered in leopard skin and had one of those car phones. All gold-plated."

The ownership of the car featured in the movie is claimed by two sources. The Museo Nazionale dell'Automobile claims the "Sunset car" has been on display in Italy since 1972, with Gloria Swanson's character Norma Desmond's initials on the rear doors of the car. Alternatively, the car used in the film, the #1587, is claimed to have been owned by Tom Monaghan in the 1980s.
