= Isotta Fraschini Tipo 8C Monterosa =

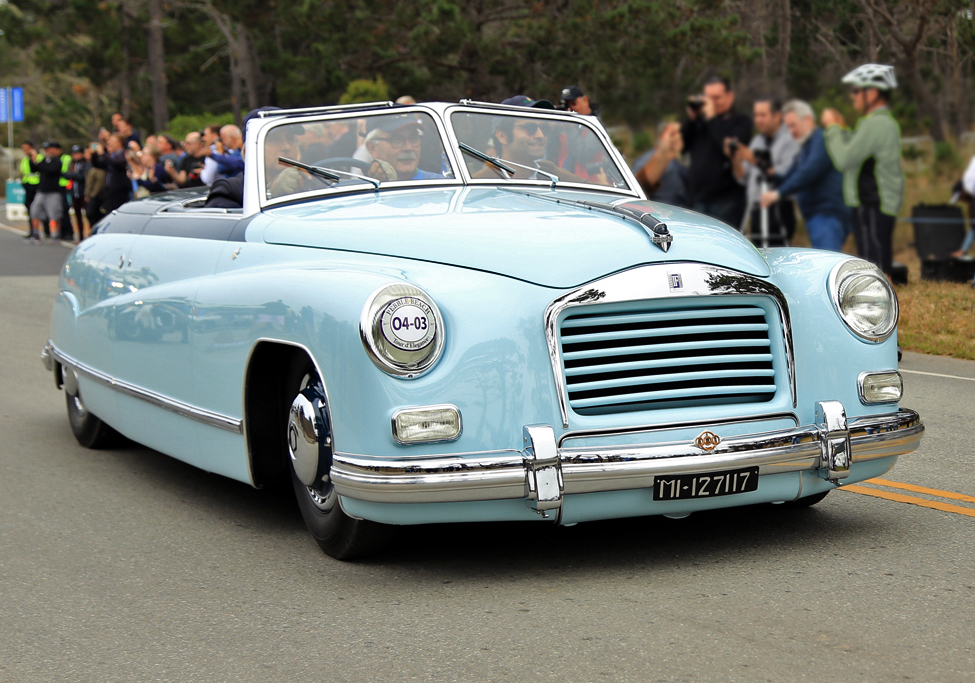
- Isotta Fraschini Tipo 8C Monterosa Boneschi Cabriolet 1948

Overview
- Manufacturer: Isotta Fraschini
- Production: 3-6
- Model years: 1947–1949
- Assembly: Milan, Italy
- Designer: Vieri Rapi, Aurelio Lampredi (engine)

Body and chassis
- Class: Luxury car
- Layout: RR layout

Powertrain
- Engine: 2.5 L OHV V8; 3.0 L OHV V8; 3.4 L OHV V8

Dimensions
- Wheelbase: 122 in (3,099 mm)
- Curb weight: 3,190 lb (1,450 kg)

Chronology
- Predecessor: Isotta Fraschini Tipo 8B

The Isotta Fraschini Tipo 8C Monterosa was a prototype car, designed in secret during World War II, of which between three and six were manufactured by Isotta Fraschini.

The Tipo 8C Monterosa cars were built between 1945 and 1949 with development having begun as early as 1943. The model was intended to be Isotta Fraschini's initial post-war offering once normal industrial activity resumed. The Tipo 8C would be Isotta Fraschini's first new model since production of the Tipo 8B ended in 1934 after which all activities were limited to military rearmament/war production by the National Fascist Party in power.

== Design and development ==
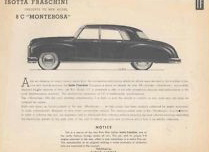
1949 Isotta Fraschini 8C Monterosa

The Tipo 8C Monterosa is equipped with a water-cooled rear mounted 3,400 cc overhead valve V8 engine equipped with cylinder heads featuring hemispherical combustion chambers. A four-speed transaxle is operated via a cable linkage and steering column-mounted shifter. The Aurelio Lampredi-designed engine develops an output of 125 PS (92 kW) and is capable of propelling the car to a top speed of 170 km/h (106 mph), with an average consumption of 15 litres per 100 kilometres (19 mpg_{‑imp}; 16 mpg_{‑US}). The engine, gearbox, and differential were largely constructed from Elektron light-metal alloy.

The initial design used a three-litre engine developing 115 PS (85 kW); a 2.5-litre version with the same power was planned to be produced as well.

The chassis is cross-platform and supports the front wheel independent, transverse arms swinging, resilient rubber and hydraulic shock absorbers, while at the rear, independent suspension with hydraulic shock absorbers and longitudinal and transverse elements with elastic rubber. The brakes are four-wheel hydraulic drums. Hydraulic jacks activated from the dashboard were in all four wheel wells.

== Unveiling and failure ==
Official presentation of the 1947–1948 Isotta Fraschini Tipo 8C Monterosa took place in October 1947 at the Paris Motor Show in the Grand Palais. The "Monterosa" represented the swan song of the prestigious Milanese brand and did not reach the production stage. The chassis pre-built series were set up for a 4-door sedan by Zagato, a two-door sedan by Touring and convertibles by Boneschi. All versions had six seats. This attempt to resurrect a model of automotive superiority was a complete failure. Only repeated restructuring of Isotta Fraschini's holding company made it possible to maintain its Italian plants and preserve a pair of prototypes to this day (one black coupe with a sunroof, and one two-tone white and dark-blue convertible).
