= Zagato AGTZ Twin Tail =

Sports car model

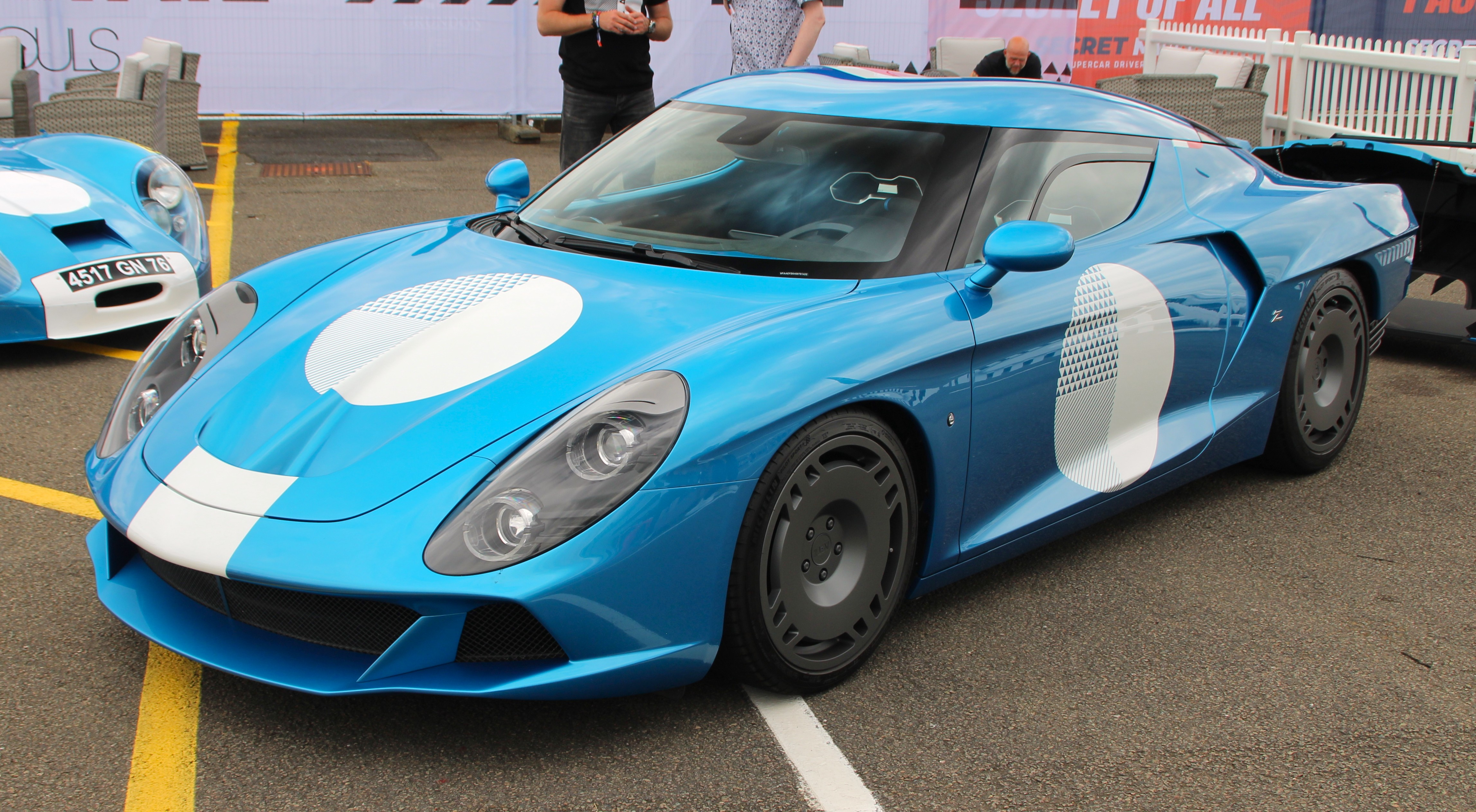

Overview
- Manufacturer: Zagato
- Production: 2024

Body and chassis
- Body style: 2-door coupé

Powertrain
- Engine: 1.8 L Renault TCe M5Pt (Nissan MR18DDT) turbocharged I4

Dimensions
- Wheelbase: 2,419 mm (95.2 in)
- Length: 4,305–4,802 mm (169.5–189.1 in)
- Curb weight: 1,100 kg (2,425 lb)

The Zagato AGTZ Twin Tail is a sports car produced by Zagato and introduced in 2024.

== Overview ==
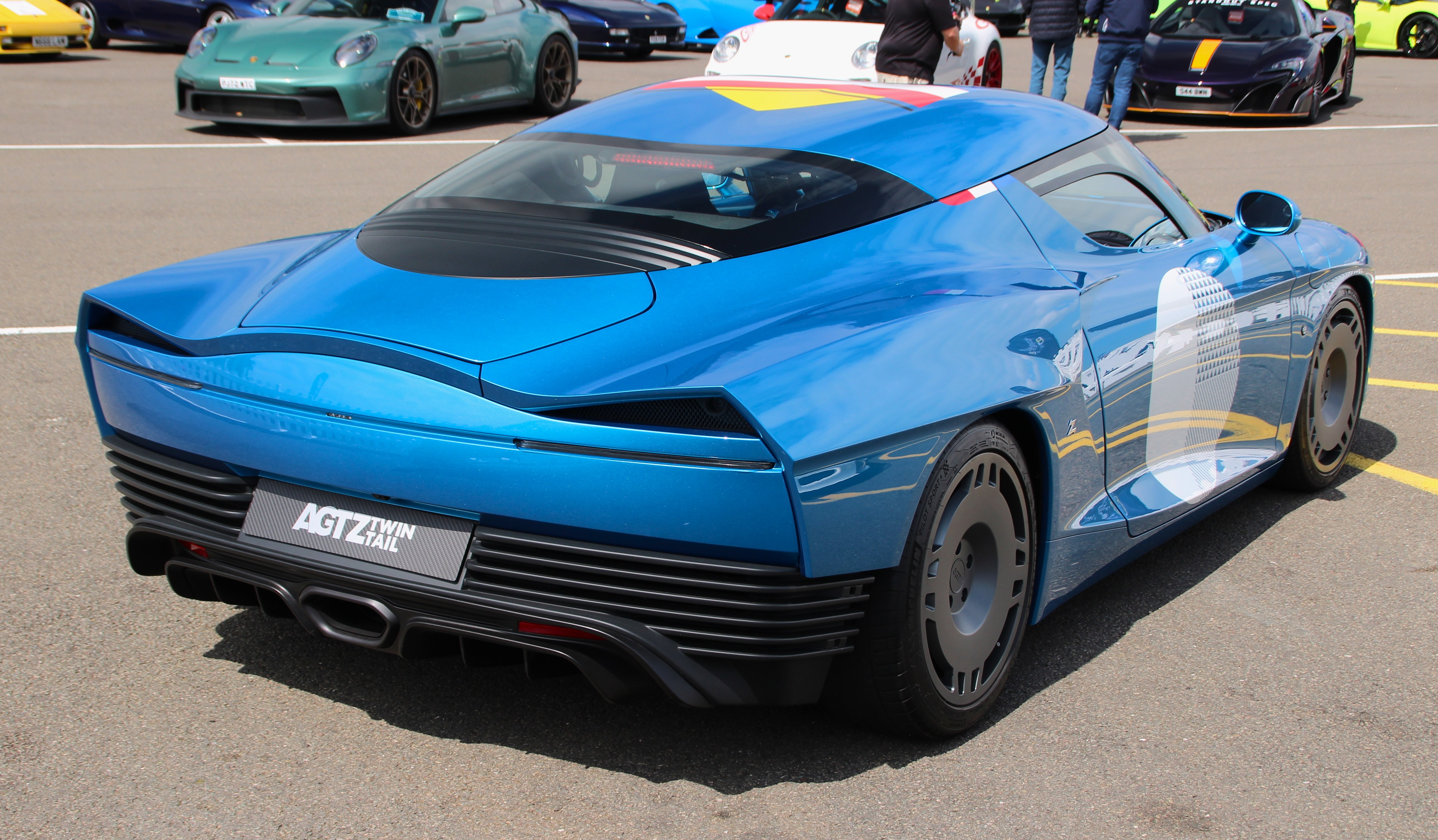
Rear view

In February 2024, the Italian design studio and bodyworks presented its first project under its own Zagato brand since the 1990s. The small-volume vehicle was created on the initiative of the Polish company La Squadra from Katowice, constituting a modern interpretation of the Alpine A220 racing car from 1969, known for its participation in Le Mans series races.

The Alpine A110 sports car was used as the technical basis on which the body was based. At the same time, Zagato has developed a unique styling project focusing on references to the classic A220, depicting widely spaced, oval headlights, as well as extensive air intakes in the hood, bumpers and fenders. A characteristic solution is the variable length of the body, which can be obtained by removing an applied aerodynamically shaped panel. Apart from the manufacturer's markings, there were no changes to the passenger cabin, and Zagato did not interfere with the technical parameters of the 1.8-liter Alpine petrol engine.

== Sales ==
The AGTZ Twin Tail was created in a strictly limited series to 19 units. At the time of its premiere, the Italian company declared that the price for the basic copy was EUR 650,000. The project partner, the Katowice dealership group La Squadra, was responsible for the promotional activities and sales of the vehicle.
