= Maserati Tipo V4 =

Interwar grand touring racecar

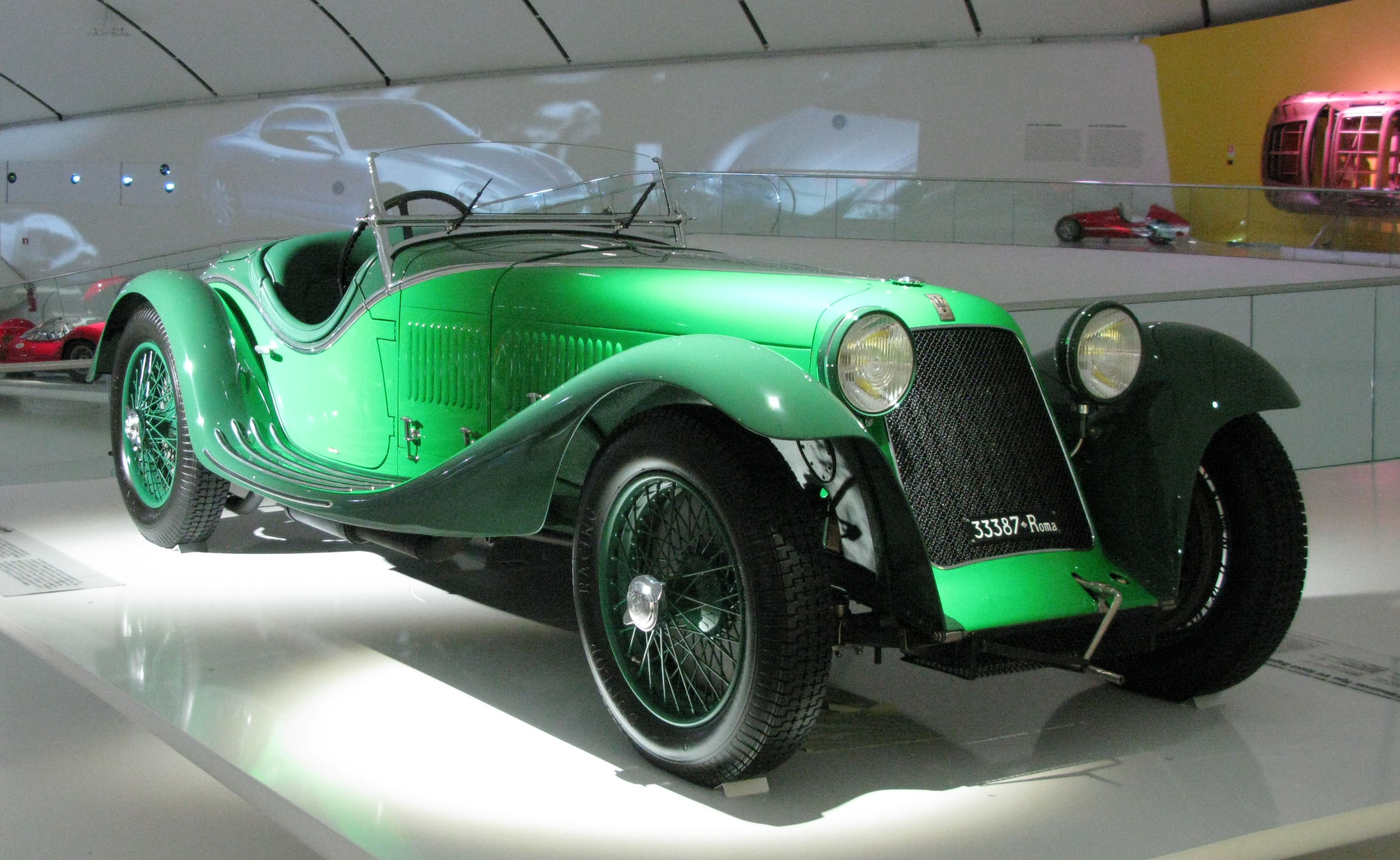

Overview
- Manufacturer: Maserati
- Production: 1929–1932
- Designer: Zagato

Body and chassis
- Class: Torpedo/Grand tourer
- Layout: Front-engine, rear-wheel drive
- Chassis: Steel ladder frame, aluminum body panels

Powertrain
- Engine: 3,961 cc (241.7 cu in) 22.5° V16 32-valve DOHC
- Power output: 375 hp (280 kW; 380 PS) (supercharged)
- Transmission: 3-speed manual

Dimensions
- Wheelbase: 2,670 mm (105 in)
- Length: 3,784 mm (149 in)
- Width: 1,610 mm (63 in)
- Curb weight: 1,050 kg (2,310 lb)

The Maserati Tipo V4 was a grand tourer-style torpedo car, designed, developed, and built by Italian manufacturer Maserati, between 1929 and 1932. It was also notably the first known racecar to be powered by a V16 engine.

Working on a shoestring budget, as always, the Maserati brothers found a solution that would allow them to use as much of the existing design as possible by simply stacking two straight-eight engines on a common crankcase at a 22.5° angle. Of course, in reality, it was not quite as simple as it looked on paper but this was the avenue pursued by Maserati. The new engine/car was dubbed the Tipo V4 in reference to the V16 engine and four-litre displacement.

In order for the two engines to be fitted side-by-side with a central intake the head on the right side bank was reversed. This row of cylinders also ran in the opposite direction to allow for the two separate crankshafts to be connected through a single gear on the output shaft that was connected to the gearbox. Gears at the front of the V16 engine were used to drive the twin overhead camshafts.

Each bank of cylinders featured its own Roots-type supercharger mounted in front of the engine. In order for the engine to run properly, Edoardo Weber himself spent two weeks devising two meticulously tuned updraft carburettors for the V16. Once completely sorted, the new Maserati engine produced 280 bhp (209 kW; 284 PS), which was almost twice as much as the most potent Tipo 26 straight eight. The gearbox featured four forward gears only.

The new V16 was mounted in a slightly widened steel ladder frame. Suspension was by a rigid axle at the front and a live rear axle, while semi-elliptic leaf springs and friction dampers were used on all four corners. The large drum brakes fitted were operated by cables. Built for Grand Prix racing, the car was clothed in a straightforward aluminium competition body. It was easily distinguishable by the dual exhausts and the offset crank handle.

== Technical data ==
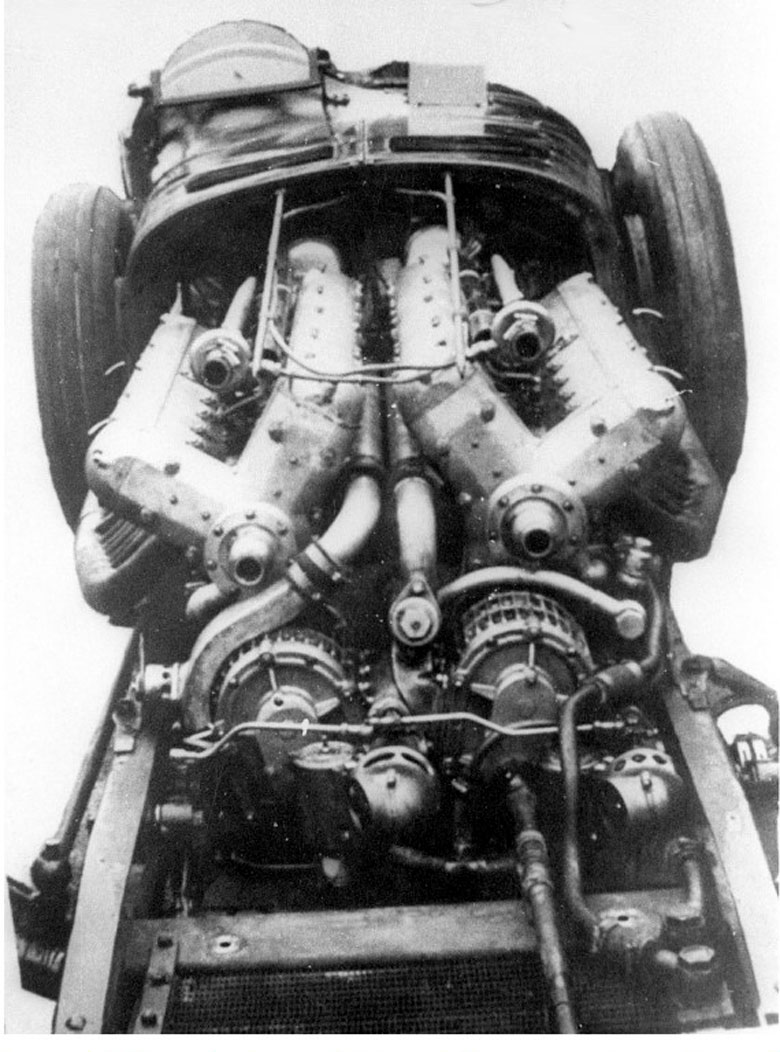
Maserati V4 16-cylinder engine

| Technical data | Tipo V4 | Tipo V5 |
|---|---|---|
| Engine: | Front mounted 22.5° 16 cylinder V engine | |
| Displacement: | 3,961 cm^{3} (241.7 cu in) | 4,906 cm^{3} (299.4 cu in) |
| Bore x stroke: | 62 mm × 82 mm (2.4 in × 3.2 in) | 69 mm × 82 mm (2.7 in × 3.2 in) |
| Max power: | 300 hp (224 kW; 304 PS) @ 5,500 rpm | 360 hp (268 kW; 365 PS) @ 5,200 rpm |
| Valve control: | 2 overhead camshafts per cylinder row, 2 valves per cylinder | |
| Compression: | 5.5:1 | 5.0:1 |
| Carburetor: | Double Weber DO | |
| Upload: | Double Roots compressors | |
| Gearbox: | 4-speed manual | |
| Suspension: | Stiff axles, longitudinal leaf springs | |
| Brakes: | Mechanical drum brakes | |
| Chassis & body: | Box beam frame with aluminum body | |
| Wheelbase: | 2,750 mm (108 in) | |
| Dry weight: | 1,050 kg (2,315 lb) | |
| Top speed: | 260 km/h (162 mph) | 270 km/h (168 mph) |
