= Lamborghini 5-95 Zagato =

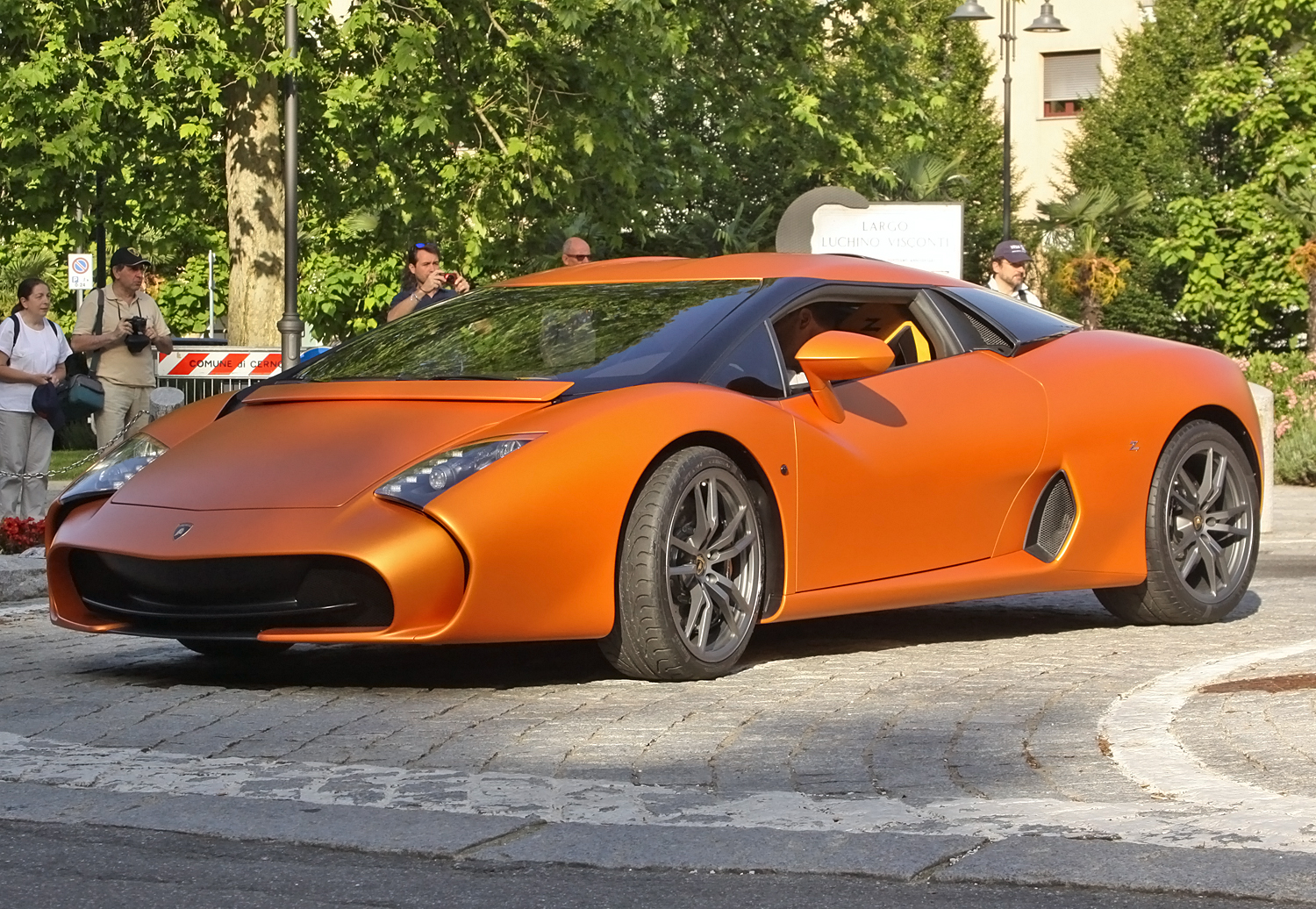

Overview
- Production: 2014
- Designer: Stéphane Schwarz at Zagato

Body and chassis
- Class: Sports car (S)
- Body style: 2-door coupé 2-door roadster
- Layout: Longitudinal, mid-engine, all-wheel-drive
- Related: Lamborghini Gallardo LP 570-4

Powertrain
- Engine: 5.2 L Lamborghini odd firing V10

The Lamborghini 5-95 Zagato is a limited production car based on a Lamborghini Gallardo LP 570-4.

It was introduced by Zagato at the 2014 Concorso d'Eleganza Villa d'Este for the coachbuilder's 95th and Lamborghini's 50th anniversaries. The exact number of cars produced is unknown, but some suggest that the name of the car hints towards 5 units to celebrate 95th anniversary of Zagato. It was commissioned by car collector Albert Spiess. The price tag of the car was over $1 million USD. In 2018, a Spyder version was released on Zagato's website.

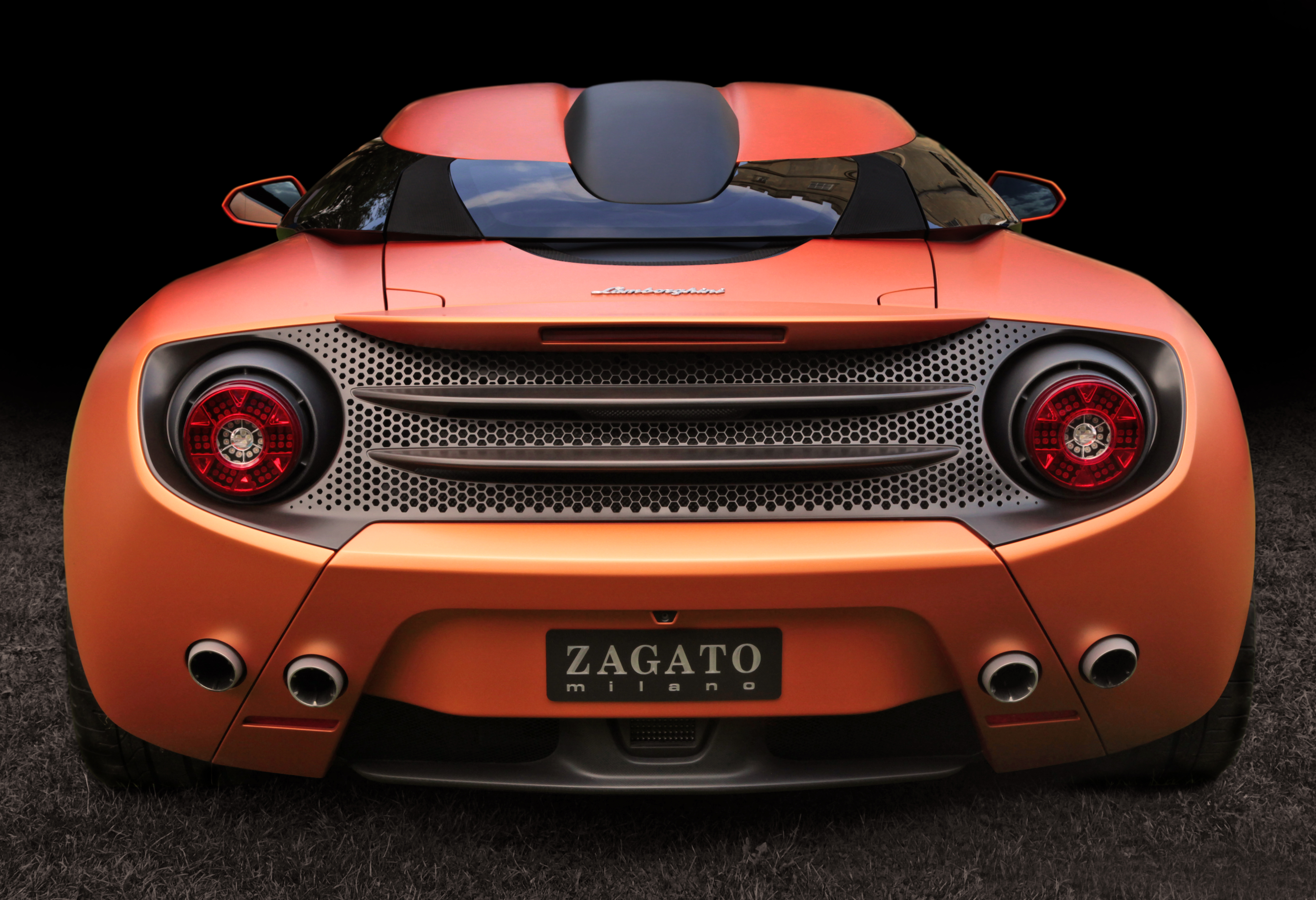
Rear view
