= Capricorn 01 Zagato =

Overview
- Manufacturer: Capricorn Automotive
- Production: 2026
- Assembly: Mönchengladbach, Germany

Body and chassis
- Class: Sports car (S)
- Body style: 2-door coupé
- Layout: Rear mid-engine, rear-wheel-drive

Powertrain
- Engine: 5.2 L (5,200 cc) V8
- Power output: 900 hp (912 PS; 671 kW); 1,001 N⋅m (738 lb⋅ft) of torque
- Transmission: 5-speed manual

Dimensions
- Wheelbase: 2,560 mm (101 in)
- Length: 5,060 mm (199 in)
- Width: 1,980 mm (78 in)
- Height: 1,150 mm (45 in)
- Curb weight: 1,200 kg (2,646 lb)

The Capricorn 01 Zagato is a high performance sports car manufactured by German automobile manufacturer Capricorn Automotive in 2026.

== History ==
In October 2025, the Italian studio Zagato presented its latest project, which was created in cooperation with a company not yet involved in the production of its own brand of cars - the German company Capricorn Automotive, a branch of the Capricorn Group specializing mainly in being a subsupplier of materials for the automotive industry, among others. The body design of the Capricorn 01 by Zagato was distinguished by soaring proportions and numerous, extensive air intakes, the shape and layout of which were dictated by the desire to ensure the best possible aerodynamic properties.

The passenger compartment features a classic, minimalist design, abandoning digital elements in favor of a purely analogue arrangement. The switch panel has been kept to a minimum, with the main feature of the carbon-fibre-clad cockpit, in front of the three-spoke steering wheel, being the analogue dials, consisting of three separate dials. Both the steering wheel and the gear shift knob are covered in leather, and the only buttons are those for the driving modes and ignition.

The 01 Zagato was powered by a 5.2-liter V8 gasoline engine that developed 900 hp and 1,000 Nm of torque, paired with a 5-speed manual transmission. This allowed it to accelerate from 0 to 100 km/h in 3 seconds and reach a top speed of 360 km/h (220 mph), with a total weight of 1,200 kg (2,600 lb).

== Release ==
As with most of the Italian studio's projects, the 01 Zagato was built in a strictly limited series of 19 units, constituting a symbolic reference to 1919, when Zagato began its operations. The price of the limited edition supercar was set at €2.95 million. Production was handled by the Capricorn Automotive plant in Mönchengladbach, Germany.
