= Zagato Maserati Mostro =

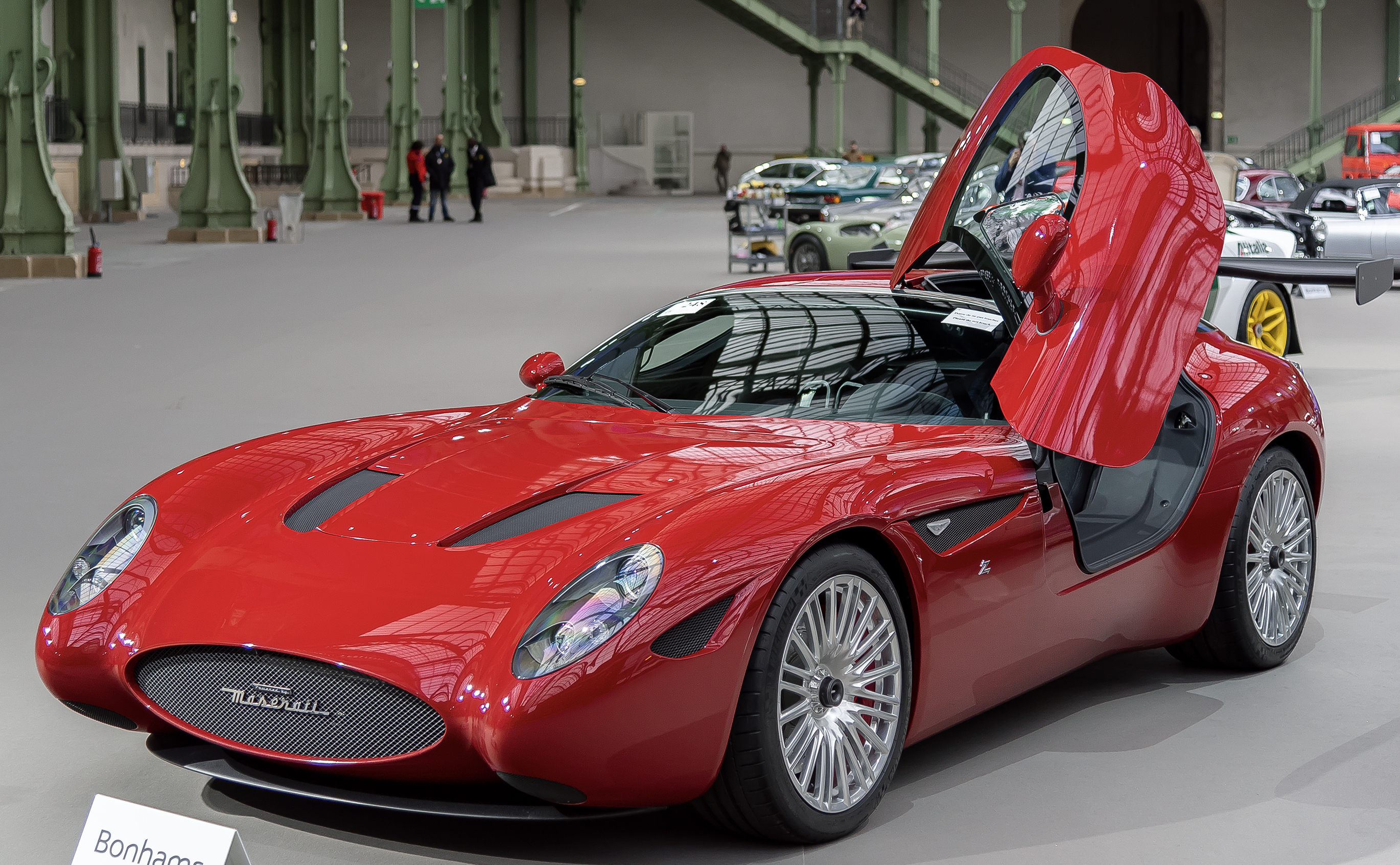

Overview
- Manufacturer: Zagato
- Model years: 2015; 2022
- Designer: Norihiko Harada at Zagato

Body and chassis
- Body style: 2-door coupé 2-door barchetta

Powertrain
- Engine: 4.2 L Ferrari-Maserati F136 U V8

The Zagato Maserati Mostro is a limited edition car, produced by Zagato and revealed at the 2015 Villa d'Este Concours d'Elegance.

== History ==
The Mostro was created to celebrate the 100-year anniversary of Maserati. It uses the 4.2-litre V8 engine and transmission from the Maserati GranTurismo. Only five cars were produced by Zagato. The car is a tribute to the Maserati 450S Coupé of 1957 bodied by Zagato. Just as the original Mostro was built for racing and subsequently converted into a road car, so the modern-day Mostro has been created primarily for track use using racing technology, while also being useable on the road. The car presented at the concours did not have a wing but the red car offered in February 2020 at a Bonhams auction in Paris did have one.

Seven years later, in 2022, Zagato unveiled a Barchetta version of the Mostro. Zagato said they would build an additional five examples of the Barchetta, all of which they claimed to have sold. This version was offered with a choice of a 4.2-litre Maserati V8 or the 3.0-litre V6 from the Maserati MC20.

== Specifications ==
The chassis is based on the Gillet Vertigo .5. It uses a carbon fibre 'MonoCell' construction, supplemented by a mid-structure of steel tubes forming the cockpit and a sub-frame supporting the fuel tank, exhaust system, rear suspension and gearbox. The bodywork is made in Italy, entirely out of carbon fibre.

The Maserati V8 engine is set back in the chassis, has dry-sump lubrication and is equipped with a programmable engine management system. Power (undisclosed but estimated to be in the region of 460 bhp) reaches the ground via a semi-automatic, six-speed rear transaxle, an arrangement that optimises front/rear weight distribution. It uses double wishbone suspension front and rear with pushrod actuation of the springs/dampers. The alloy wheels are 19" in diameter and there are large disc brakes all round.

== Gallery ==
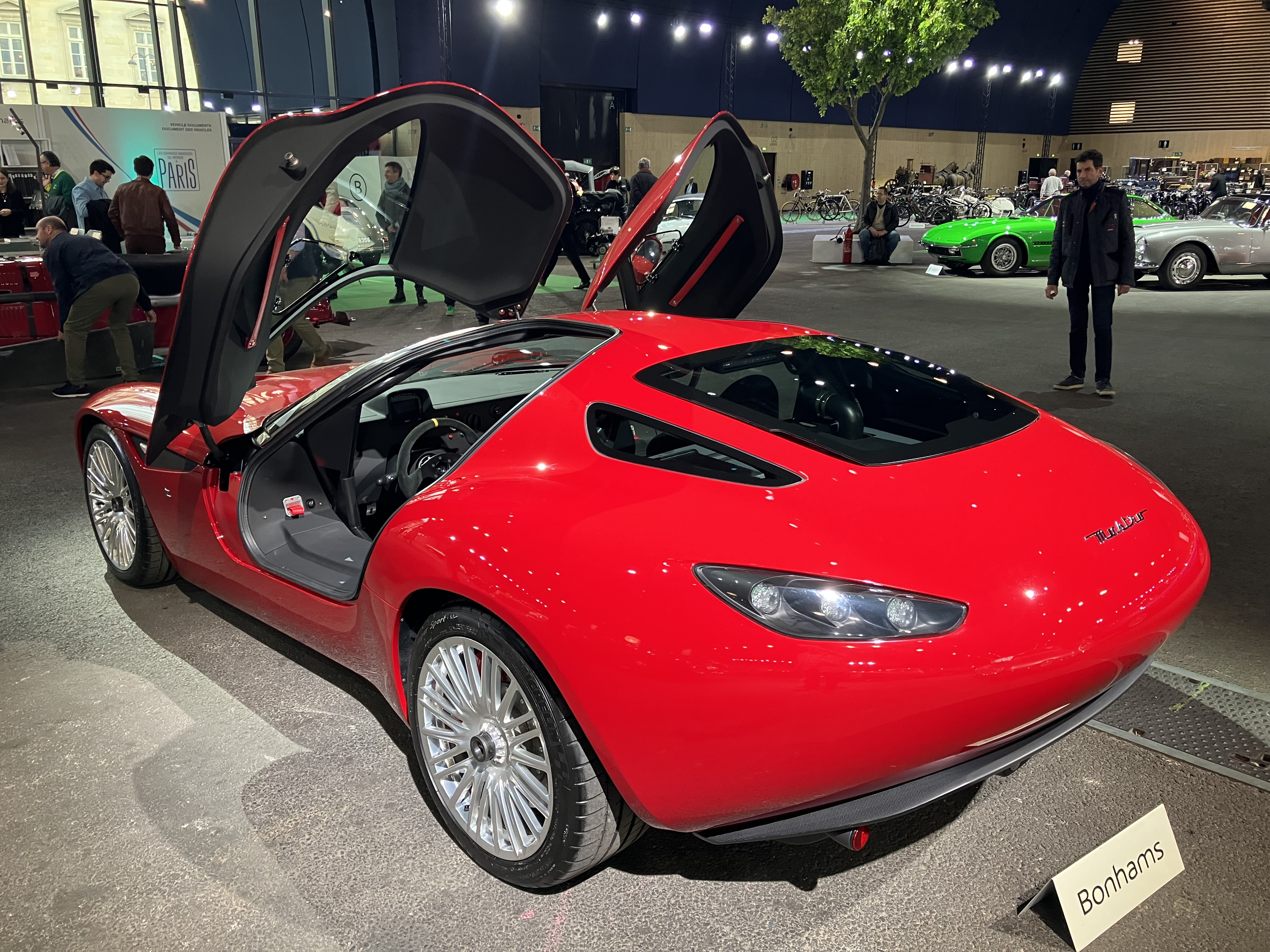
Rear quarter view

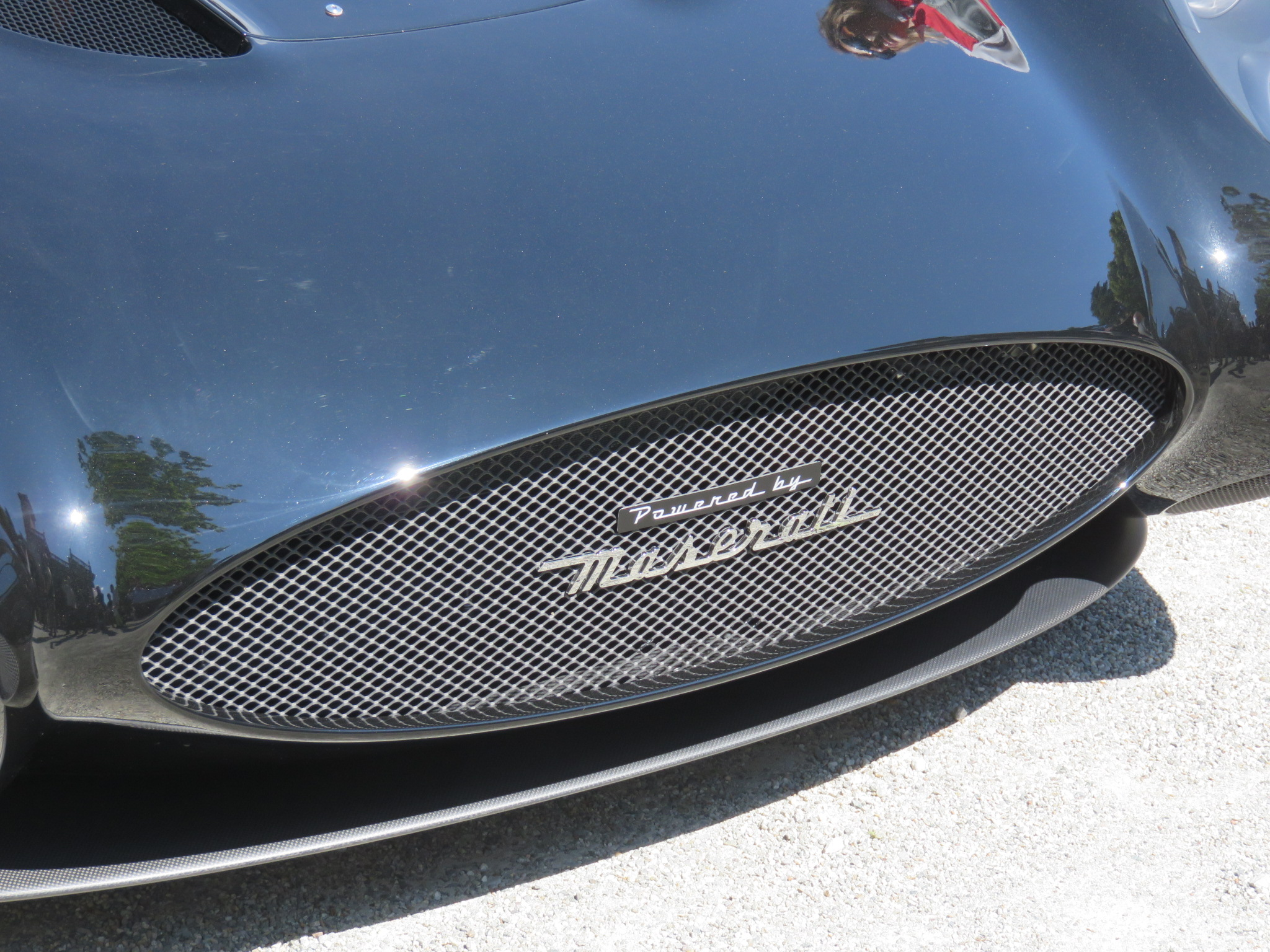
Close up of the front grille

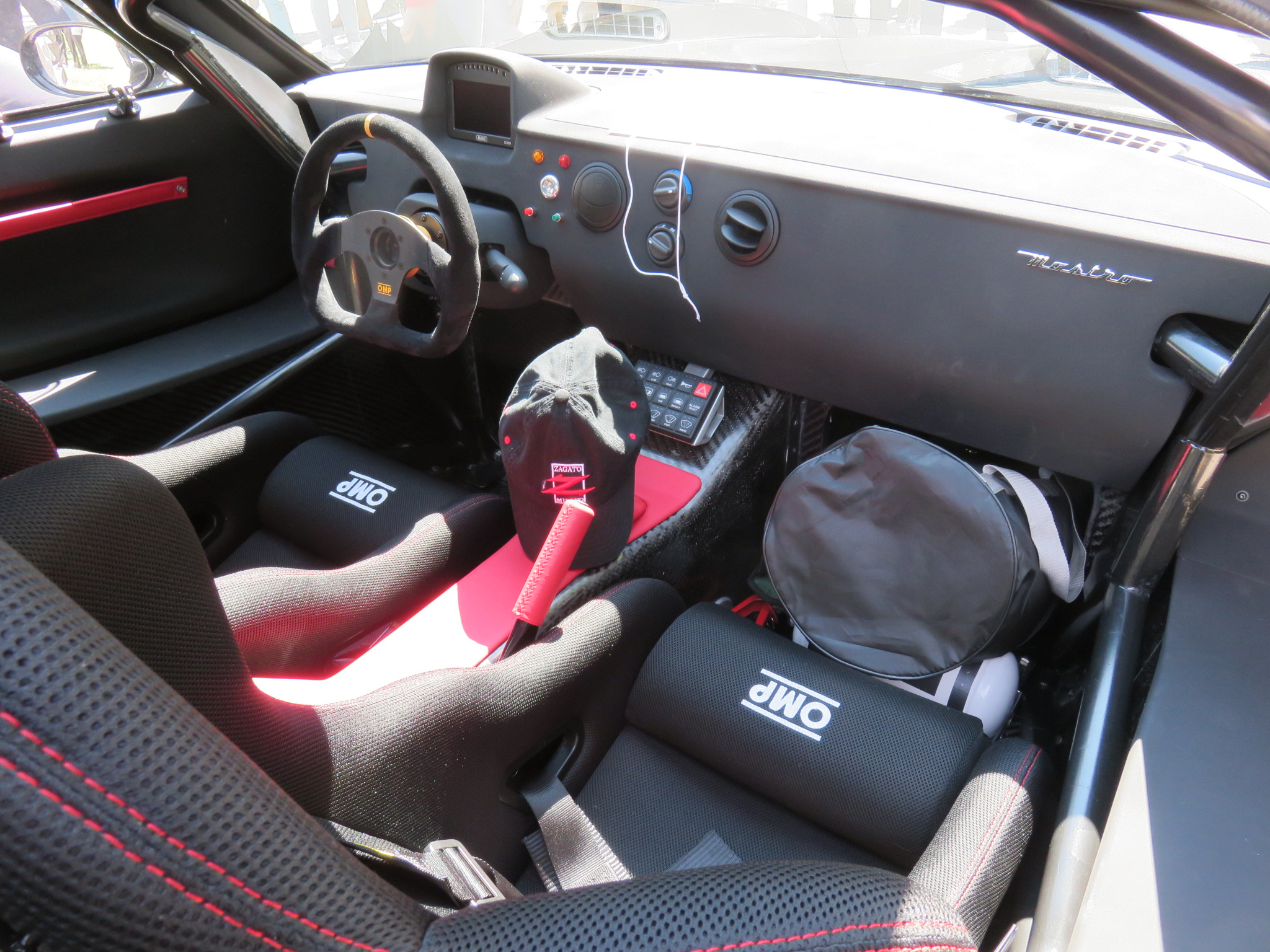
Interior view
