= Zagato =

Italian coachbuilding company

Zagato Milano
- Type: Società a responsabilità limitata
- Industry: Automotive
- Founded: Milan, Italy (1919)
- Founder: Ugo Zagato
- Headquarters: Rho, Italy
- Area served: Worldwide
- Key people: Andrea Zagato, CEO
- Services: Automotive design
- Website: www.zagato.it

Zagato is an Italian coachbuilding company founded by Ugo Zagato in 1919. The design center of the company is located in Terrazzano, a village near Rho, Lombardy, Italy.

== History ==
=== The 1910s: Aeronautics ===
Ugo Zagato was an Italian automotive designer and builder. He was born in Gavello near Rovigo on June 25, 1890. He began his coach-building career in 1919 when he left "Officine Aeronautica Pomilio" to set up his own business in Milan. He intended to transfer various construction techniques from aeronautics to the automotive sector. Cars of the time were often bulky and heavy; Zagato envisioned them as lightweight structures with a frame in sheet aluminum; similar to an aircraft fuselage.

=== The 1920s: Classic models ===
During the 1920s, Zagato's focus was on designing race cars. At the beginning of the decade, he was asked by Alfa Romeo to design bodies for some of its G1, RL, and RM models. In 1925 Vittorio Jano, Alfa Romeo's Chief Engineer, asked him to create a body for the Alfa Romeo P2's heir, the Alfa 6C 1500. Zagato, using his knowledge of aeronautics, designed a sleek, light body for the car. It scored second place overall at the 1927 Mille Miglia and won the 1928 edition. The 1500's technical qualities were improved upon with the Alfa Romeo 6C 1750, introduced in 1927 with several body styles (Turismo, Sport, Gran Turismo, Super Sport, and Gran Sport). The 1750 would go on to achieve overall victories in the 1929 and 1930 Mille Miglia (Taking the first four spots in the latter date). In 1929, Enzo Ferrari, at the time a racing driver for Alfa Romeo, founded Scuderia Ferrari as the official team for Alfa Romeo's race cars.

=== The 1930s: Aerodynamic models ===
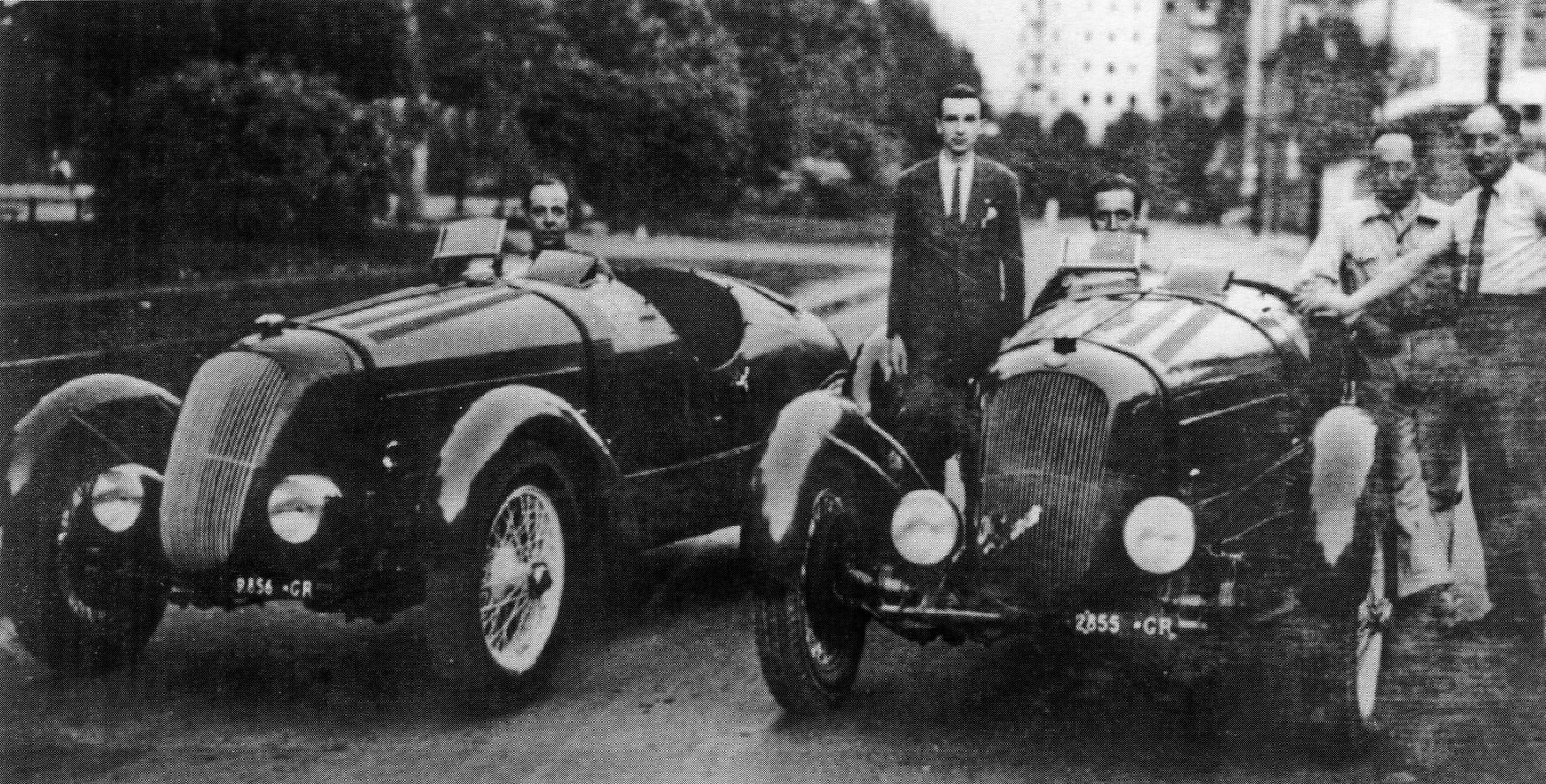
Elio and Ugo Zagato seen with 2 Zagato Alfa Romeo 6C 2300s (1937)

Zagato continued to build a variety of aerodynamic cars, adopting inclined windscreens, more aerodynamic headlights, and convex boot lids. He also favored perforated disc wheels that improved brake cooling. All Alfa Romeo 8Cs received coachwork from Zagato. In January 1932, Zagato-bodied cars also began to be built by Carrozzeria Brianza. Bianchi, Fiat, Isotta Fraschini, Lancia, Maserati, and OM all experimented with lightweight and aerodynamic Zagato bodies, especially for race cars. The list of victories includes eight Mille Miglia, four Targa Florio, four Le Mans, and four Spa Francorchamps OA victories. In the 1930s, Zagato-bodied models began to compete and dominate in different classes and categories. Thirty-six Zagato-bodied cars entered the 1938 Mille Miglia, making up one-third of the participants.

=== The 1940s: Panoramic models ===
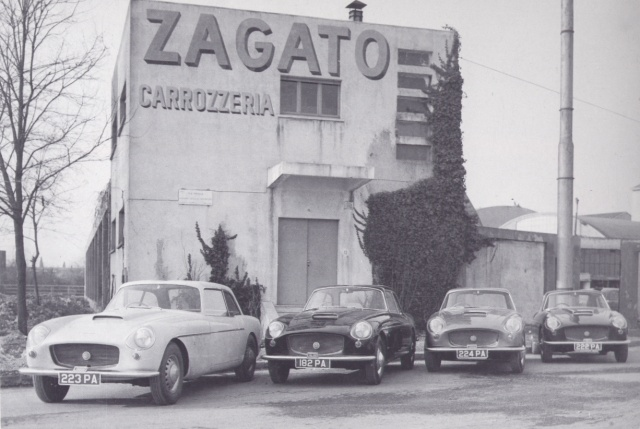
Bristol 406 outside 16 Via Giorgina in Milano from 1945 to 1960

At the outbreak of the Second World War, Zagato left Milan and fled to Lake Maggiore. On 13 August 1943, an RAF bombing raid destroyed his coachworks on Corso Sempione road. He found new premises at Saronno alongside the Isotta Fraschini works, on behalf of which he constructed trucks, military vehicles, and a futuristic 8C Monterosa. He returned to Milan at the end of the war and re-established his company at Via Giorgini 16, close to the Alfa Romeo historic home at Portello.

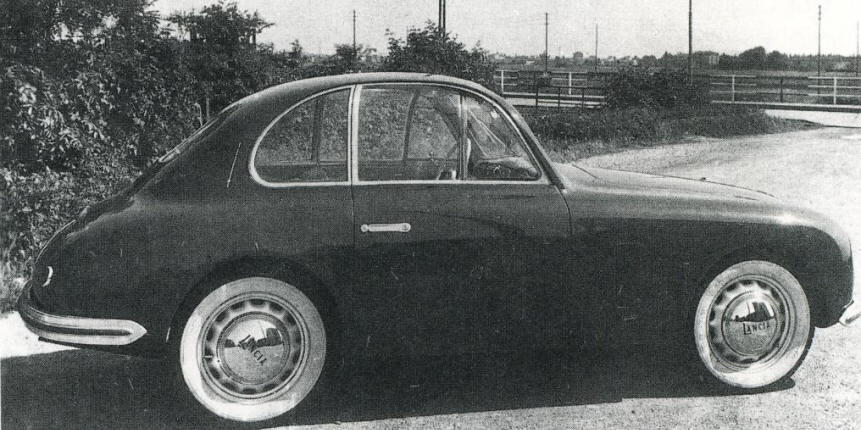
1949 Lancia Ardea Panoramica

Zagato wanted to design more spacious and comfortable greenhouse-style cars characterized by airiness and good visibility. Incorporating large, glazed areas made of plexiglass, a lightweight material that replaced heavier traditional glass, the "Panoramic" body style, an invention of Vieri Rapi, chief Zagato stylist at that time, would mark the rebirth of his coachwork. Alfa Romeo, Fiat, Lancia, Maserati, and MG employed this innovative body design. In 1949, he built a Panoramic body for the Ferrari 166 Mille Miglia belonging to Antonio Stagnoli, the first Ferrari coupé for a client.

=== The 1950s: Gran Turismo models ===
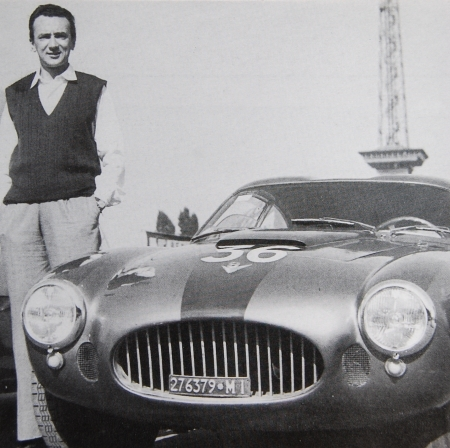
Elio Zagato and Fiat 8V in 1955.

In 1947, Elio Zagato, Ugo's first-born son, received an open-top sports car based on a Fiat 500 B chassis as a gift for his graduation from Bocconi University of Milan. This car represented the beginning of his career as a driver, earning 83 podium spots in 160 races. The birth of the Gran Turismo category, conceived in 1949 by Count Giovanni Lurani, journalist Giovanni Canestrini, and Elio himself revolutionized the world of automotive competition. The category comprised cars with sports coachwork and a production chassis or bodyshell. AC, Alfa Romeo, Abarth, Aston Martin, Bristol, Ferrari, Fiat, Fraser Nash, Maserati, Jaguar, Osca, Porsche, and Renault wore Zagato GT bodies. In 1955, Elio Zagato scored a victory in the International Gran Turismo Championship at the Avus circuit, driving a Fiat 8V GT Zagato.

=== The 1960s: Fuoriserie models ===
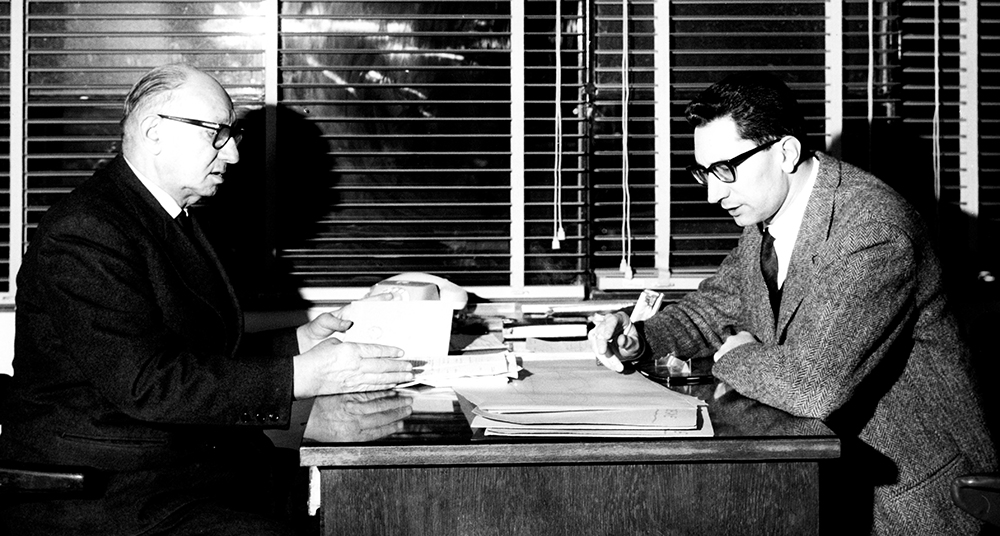
Ugo and Gianni Zagato

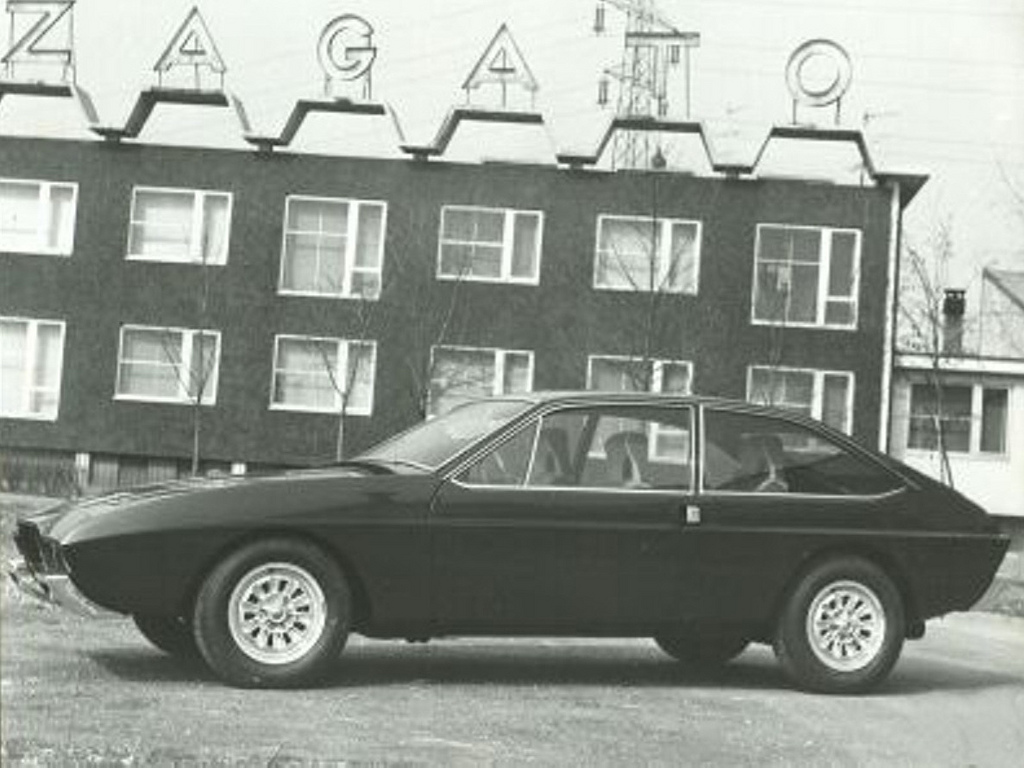
1970 Volvo GTZ

The increasing demand for specialized bodies required a change from a handcrafted to an industrial production methods. Elio Zagato found a larger location at 30 Via Arese in Terrazzano (northwest of Milan), close to Arese where Alfa Romeo would soon choose to establish new plants.

In this period, Zagato's mission was to design special bodies to be assembled in series and fitted with mechanical parts and interiors supplied by major constructors. Under the partnership with Alfa Romeo, the Giulia SZ, TZ, TZ2, 2600 SZ, 1750 4R, and the Junior Zagato were born.

In partnership with Lancia, Zagato continued the “Sport” series with the Lancia Appia Sport, the Flaminia Sport and Super Sport, the Flavia Sport and Super Sport, and the Fulvia Sport and Sport Spider.

In addition to these, some designs were commissioned by special customers, including Bristol, Fiat, Ford, Lamborghini, Honda, Osca, Rover, and Volvo vehicles. In 1960 Ugo Zagato was awarded the Compasso d'Oro for the design of the Abarth 1000 Bialbero.

=== The 1970s: Geometric models ===
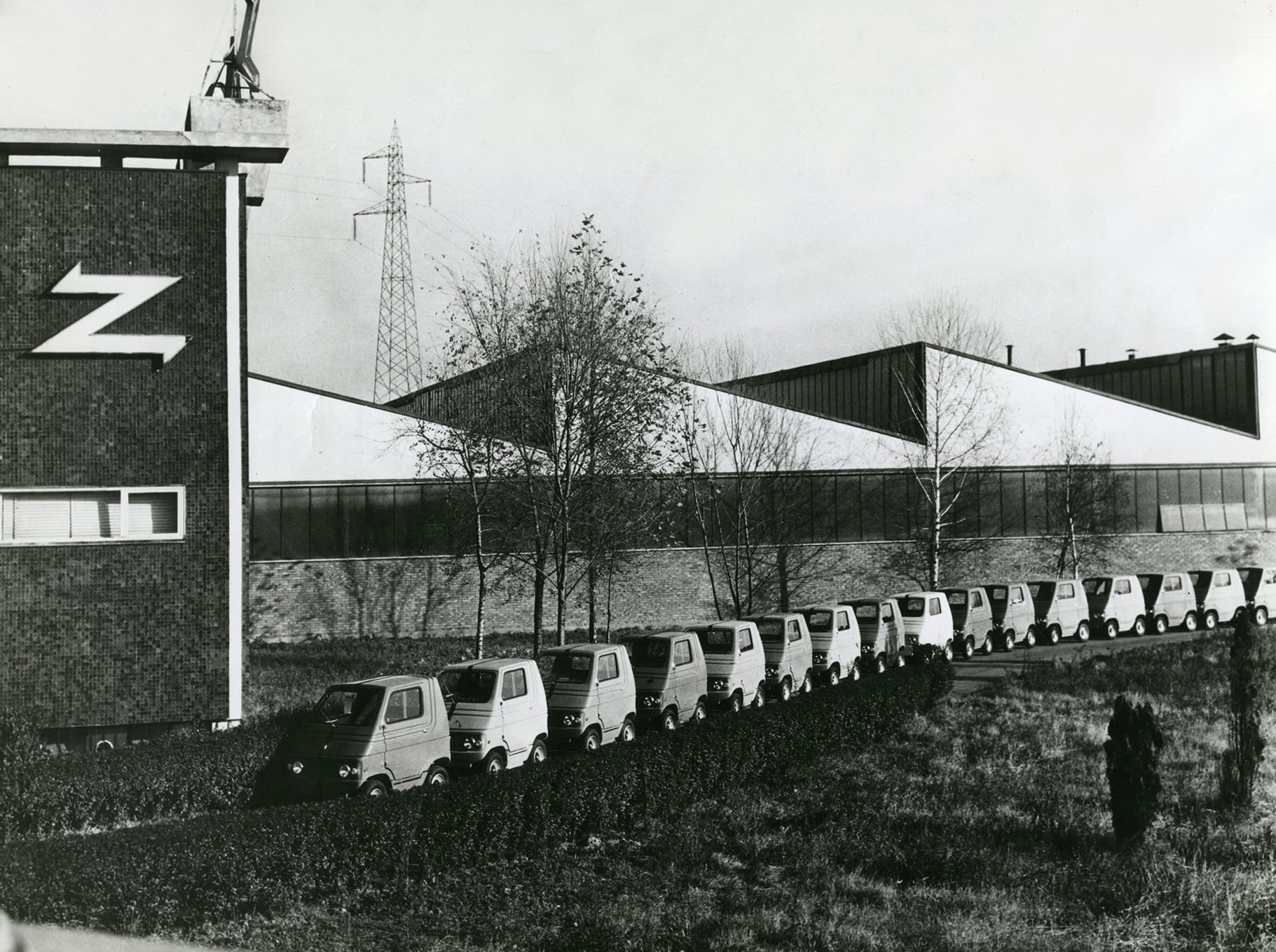
Zagato Zele electric microcars, made from 1972–76.

In response to the Oil Crisis and in contrast to the anti-functionalist trends of the era, Zagato proposed the production of electric cars such as the Zagato Zele two-seater. In 1971, a new Ferrari Zagato, the 3Z, came to life thanks to Luigi Chinetti, who financed the decidedly angular spider. In the same year, it was introduced at the Turin Motor Show and signaled the definitive departure from the SZ, TZ, Lancia Flaminia and Appia's curvy lines to embrace the squared design of the Lancia Fulvia Sport and Alfa Romeo Junior Z. Chinetti himself made a further special order.

In the 1970s, Zagato also started a new project for a mid-engine concept which became the Cadillac N.A.R.T., a luxurious, sophisticated, high-performance four-seater. The front-wheel-drive powertrain of a Cadillac Eldorado was relocated to create a mid-engine layout. Zagato was asked to build the prototype from the drawings and a clay model that was conceived in GM's studios. Other notable projects from this time include the Fiat Aster (Based on the 132) and the Volvo GTZ. The Zagato facility in Terrazzano also saw the assembly of the Lancia Beta Sport Spider, which established Lancia's name in America and Australia, as well as the Bristol 412 Targa, whose design was very similar to the Lancia's.

=== The 1980s: Limited Edition models ===
During the early 1980s, Zagato introduced several concept cars, including the Fiat Chicane, the Lancia Thema Station Wagon, the Alfa Romeo Sprint 6, Zeta 6, Alfetta, and 33 Tempo Libero, also available as a 4x4 hybrid. At the same time, the growing demand for exclusive spiders and coupes led Zagato to produce limited, numbered editions. The Aston Martin Vantage (50 units) and Volante Zagato (33 units) were the highest expression of this economic and commercial climate. Furthermore, the Milanese coachbuilder bodied the Maserati Spyder and Maserati Karif. The Alfa Romeo SZ (1989) and RZ roadster (1991) were assembled here for Alfa Romeo, both designed by the first application of the CAD process to automobiles. The SZ was an experimental, rear-wheel drive coupé that recalled Alfa Romeo's sporting pedigree established by previous Alfa–Zagato collaborations, including the 1900 SSZ, Giulietta SZ, Alfa Romeo Giulia TZ, Alfa Romeo Giulia TZ2, 2600 SZ, Junior Z, and the Alfa Romeo Zeta 6.

=== The 1990s: V-Max models ===
To keep up with the new demands of an evolving market, Zagato organized a one-make race series for Alfa Romeo SZ and RZ starting in 1993. The company soon transformed from a coachbuilder for sports cars into a transportation design studio. The company began to create designs for railways and industrial vehicles as well as prototypes and show cars on behalf of car manufacturers.

In 1991 and 1993, the Design Zagato division introduced two Ferrari V-Max models based on the 348 (348 Zagato Elaborazione) and the Testarossa (FZ93). In 1992, as a tribute to the Lancia Delta Integrale victories, the Hyena concept was created, with 24 examples being built. Zagato built the Raptor and the Lamborghini Canto concepts, both powered by a Lamborghini V12 at the request of Mike Kimberley, Lamborghini's CEO. Voted "Best Concept" at the 1996 Geneva Motor Show, the Raptor was produced in less than 4 months, thanks to the use of integrated technology applied to the CAD/CAM/CAE system that allowed the intermediate styling buck phase to be eliminated. In 1998, Zagato was commissioned by Fiat to design and produce three V-Max prototypes with low fuel consumption (3 liters/100 kilometers). The Fiat Ecobasic, developed in collaboration with Centro Stile Fiat, was judged to be the best research V-Max concept.

=== The 2000s: Custom-built models ===
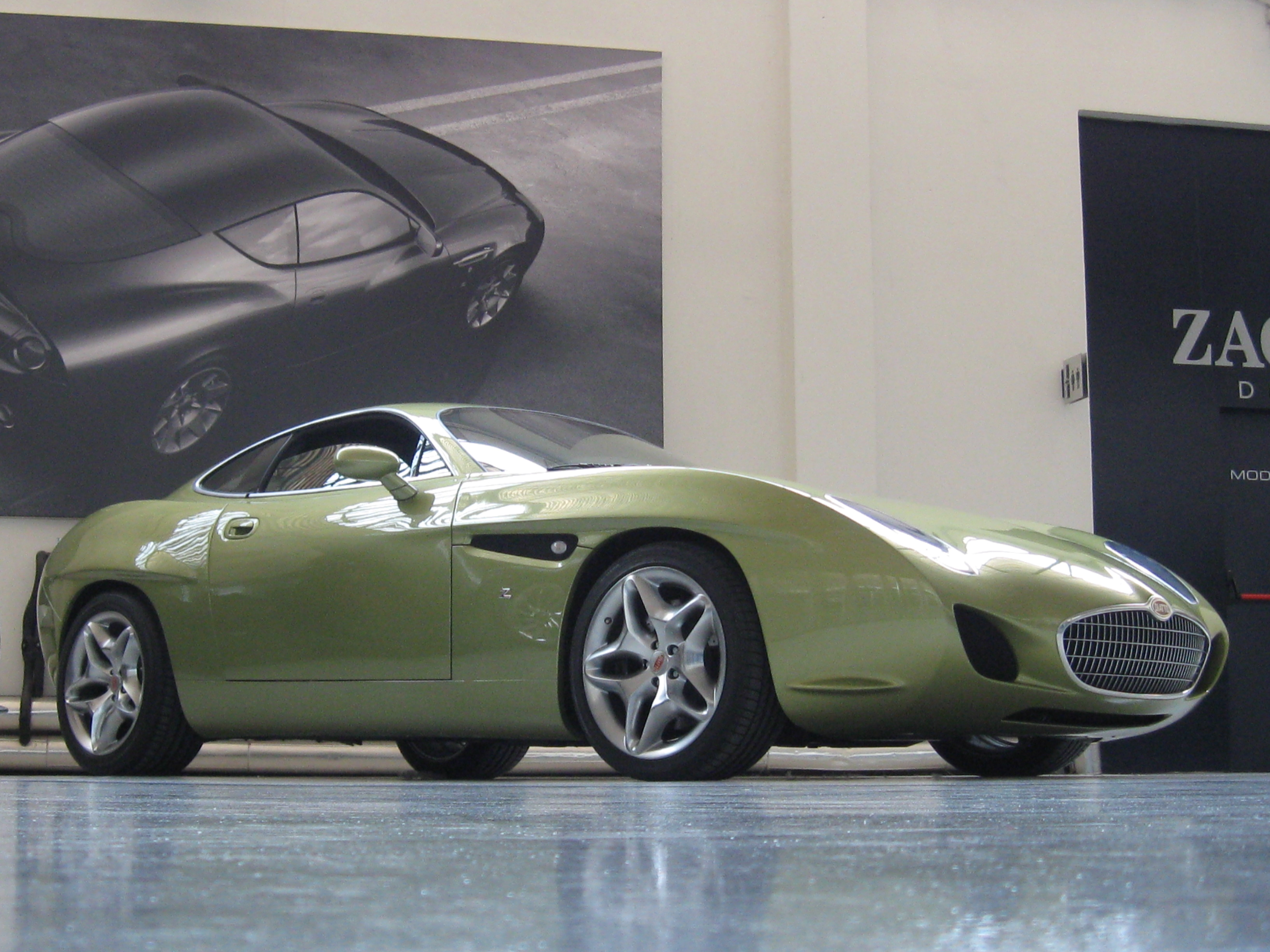
The finished Ottovu Diatto concept car at the Zagato Design Studio showroom

Special projects created for Aston Martin, Bentley, Ferrari, Maserati, Spyker Cars, Diatto, and Alfa Romeo consolidate the brand's business in making custom-built models, which are almost exclusively coupés with two seats.

=== The 2010s: Centennial models ===
The Alfa Romeo TZ3 Corsa, a race model with a carbon fiber mono-shell chassis, tubular frame, and lightweight aluminum body, and the TZ3 Stradale, a street-legal model based on the Viper ACR chassis with a carbon fiber body, were notable developments. Due to the joint venture between the Fiat and the Chrysler groups, the TZ3 Stradale became the first American Alfa Romeo. Following the Fiat 500 Coupé Zagato and AC 378 GTZ, Zagato consolidated its special relationship with Aston Martin by designing the Centennial V-Max models (as a tribute to AML's 100 years), the Vanquish Family, and, for the "Cento" years from Zagato's foundation, the Pair and the Twins collections. Porsche liaison was also revamped with the family of Zagato Carreras, as well as Lamborghini, Maserati, and BMW connection with the 575, the Mostro, and the BMW Twins collections. Since 2017, Zagato has been a partner in the resurrection of the Italian luxury sport brand Iso Rivolta.

2019 marked 100 years since Zagato's founding.

=== The 2020s: Own models ===
In the 2020s, Zagato has focused its commitment to production of its own cars, a movement started in 2015 with the Mostro; in 2022, it released a barchetta version of the Mostro, limited to 5 units, and in 2024, announced the AGTZ Twin Tail, based on the Alpine A110, limited to 19 units.

== Timeline ==
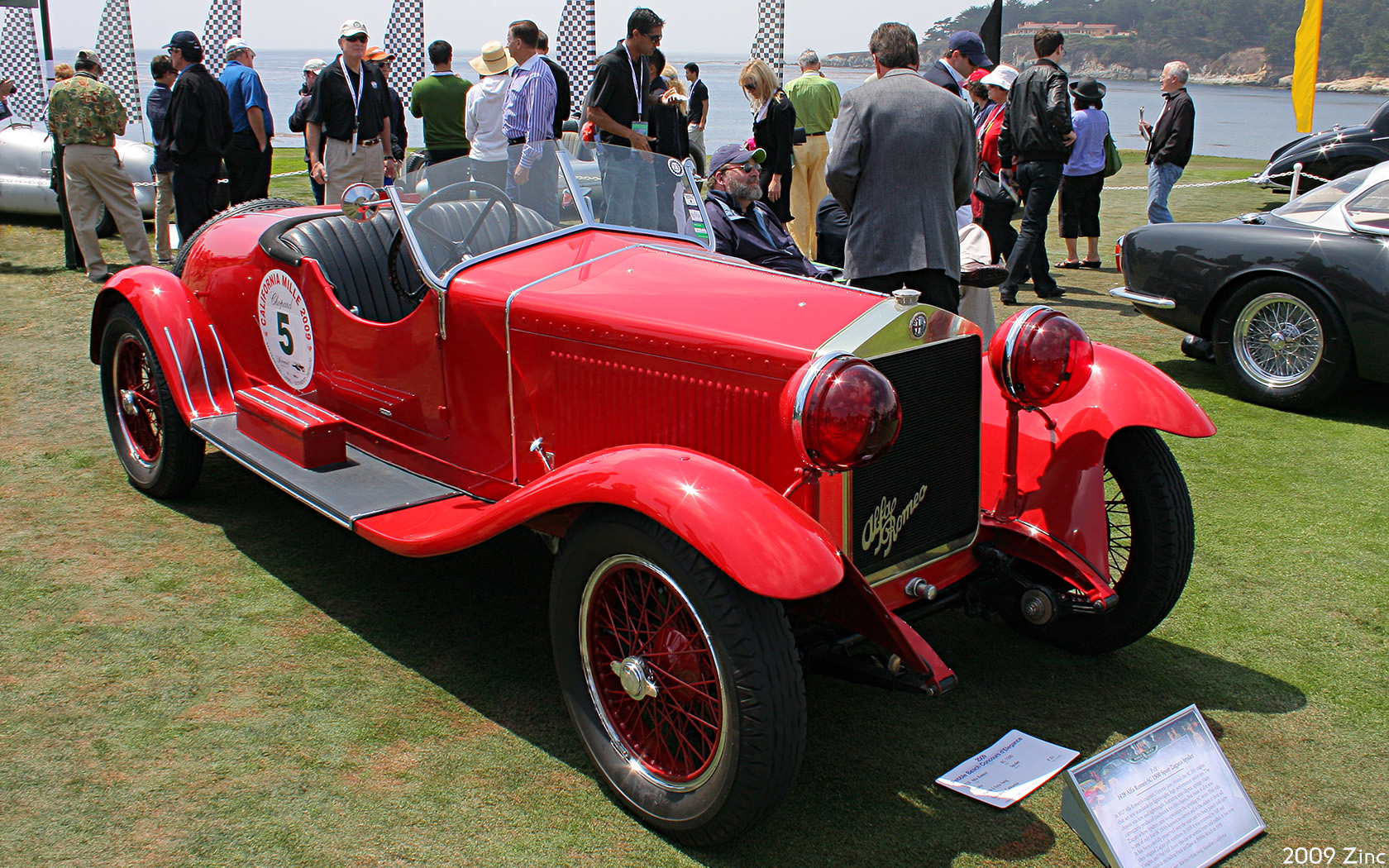
1928 Alfa Romeo 6C 1500 Sport Spyder Zagato

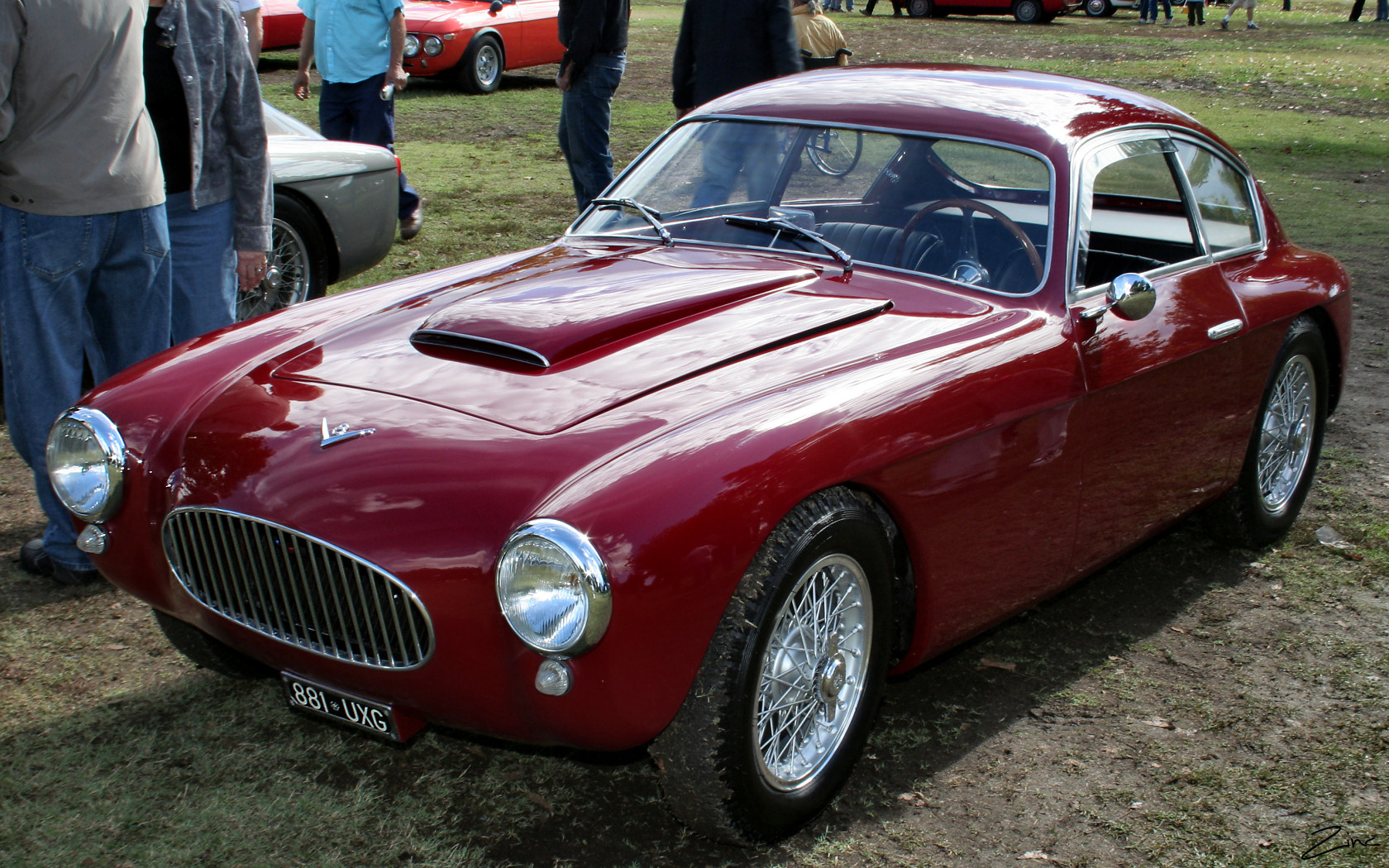
1955 Fiat 8V Zagato

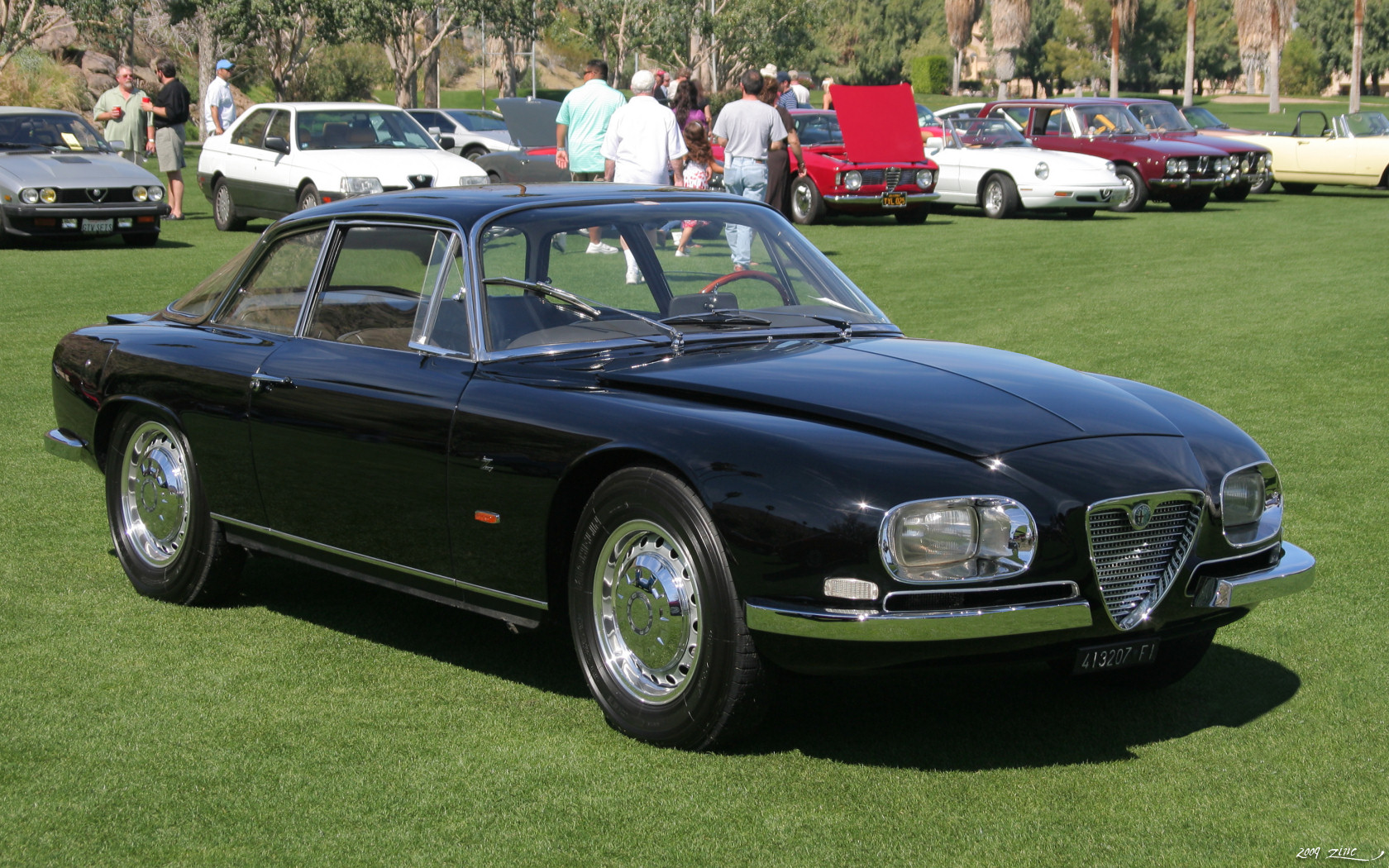
1966 Alfa Romeo 2600 Zagato

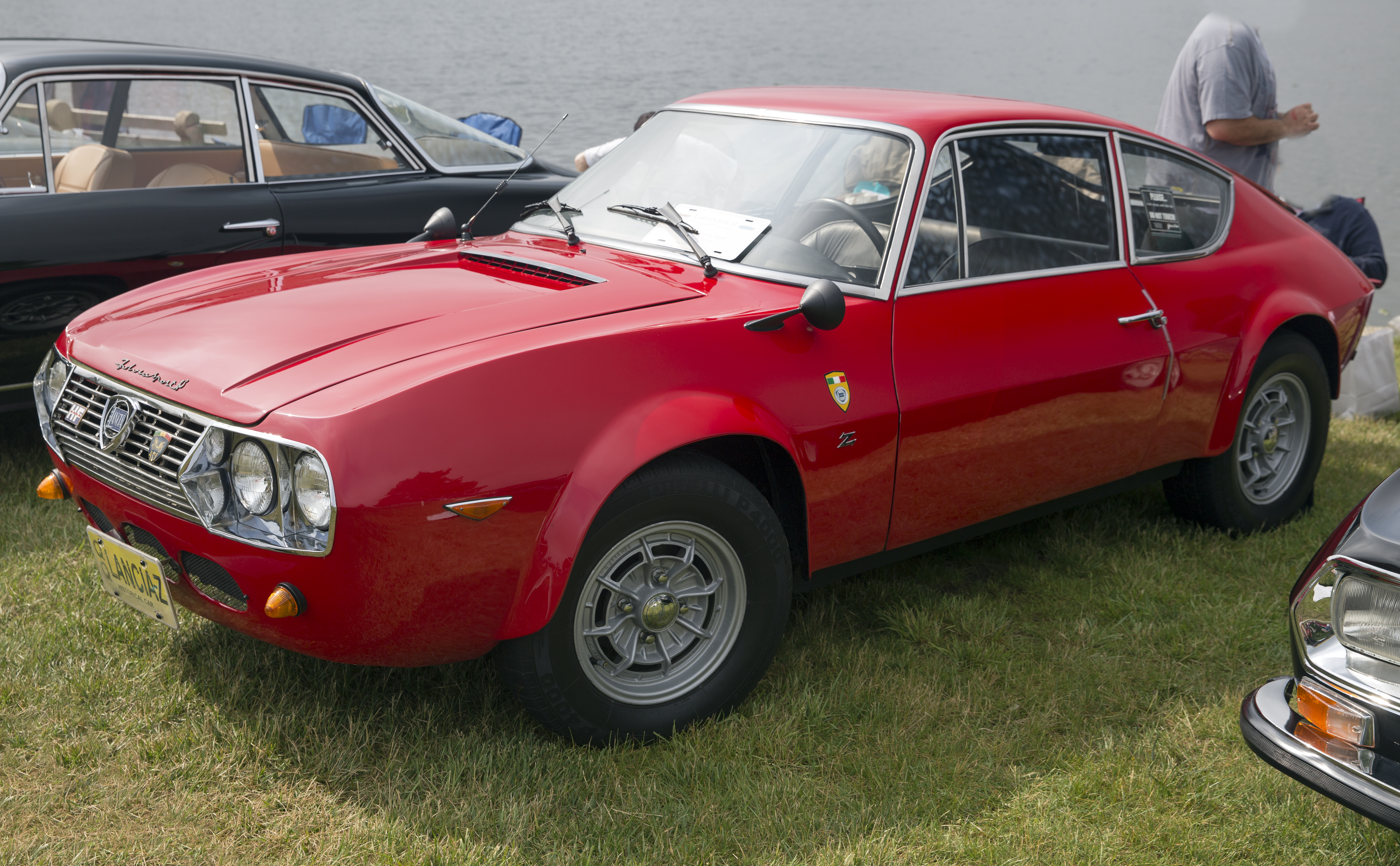
1967 Lancia Fulvia Sport Zagato

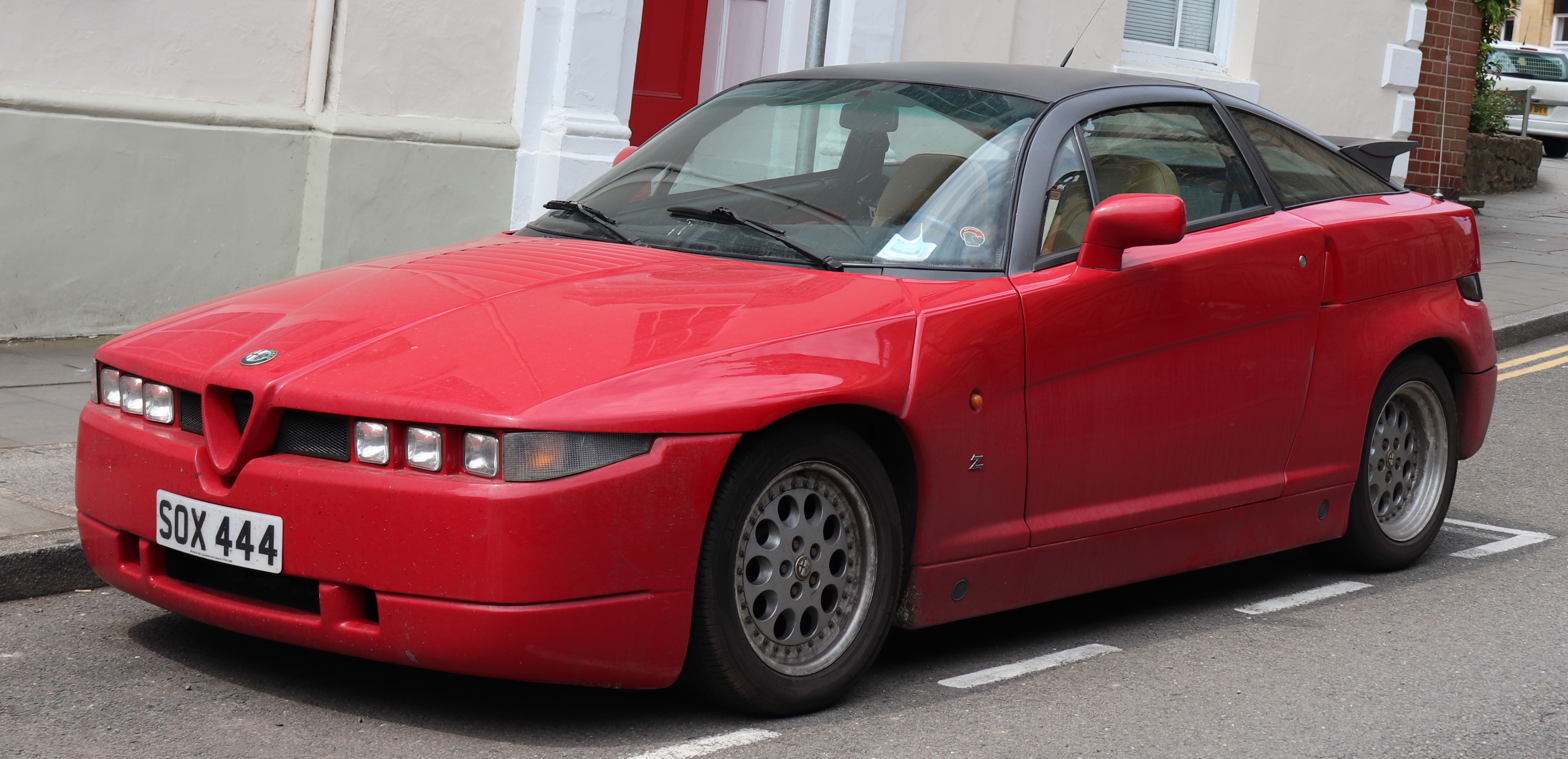
1990 Alfa Romeo SZ (Sprint Zagato)

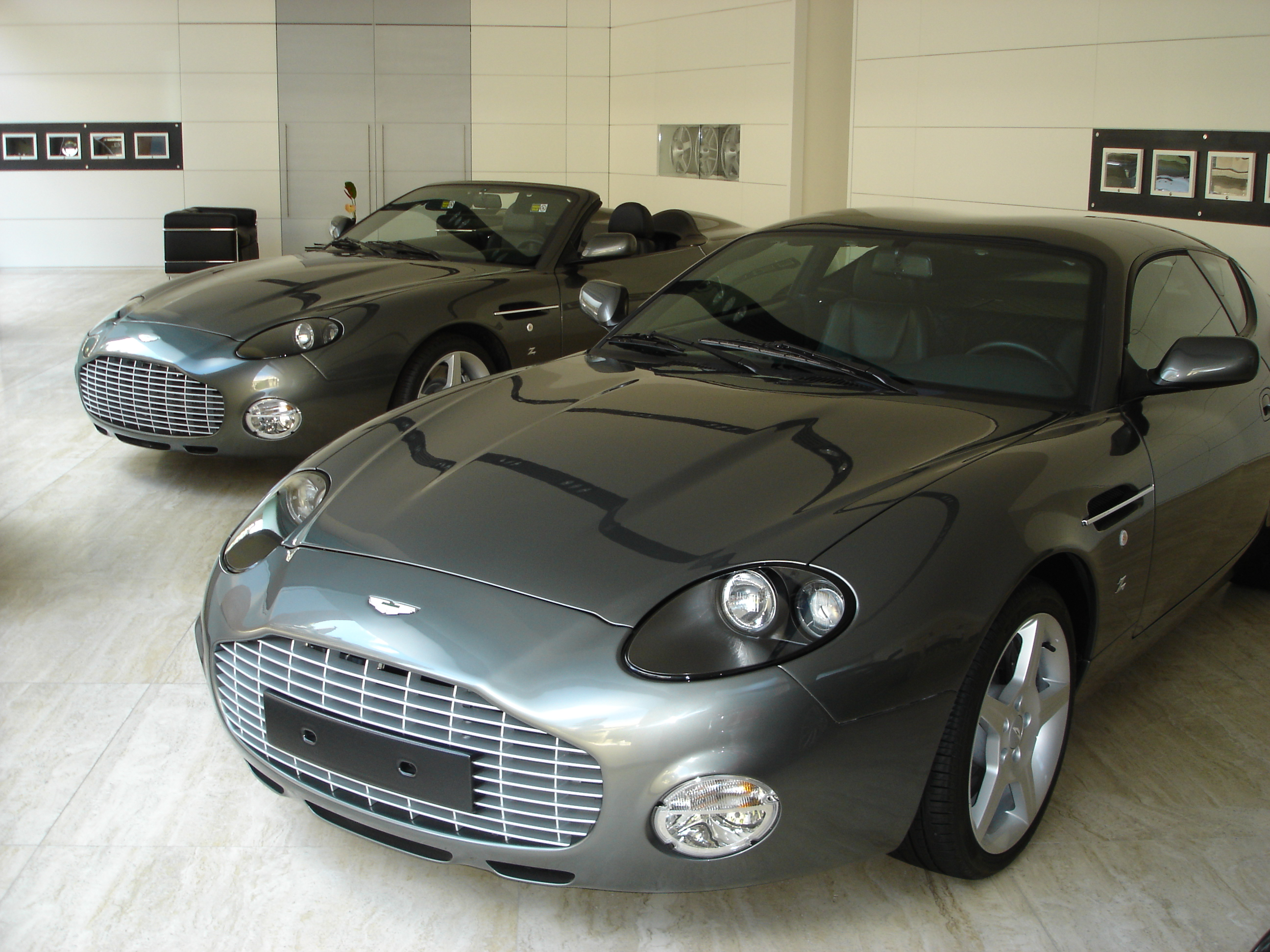
2003 Aston Martin DB7 Zagato Coupe and Roadster

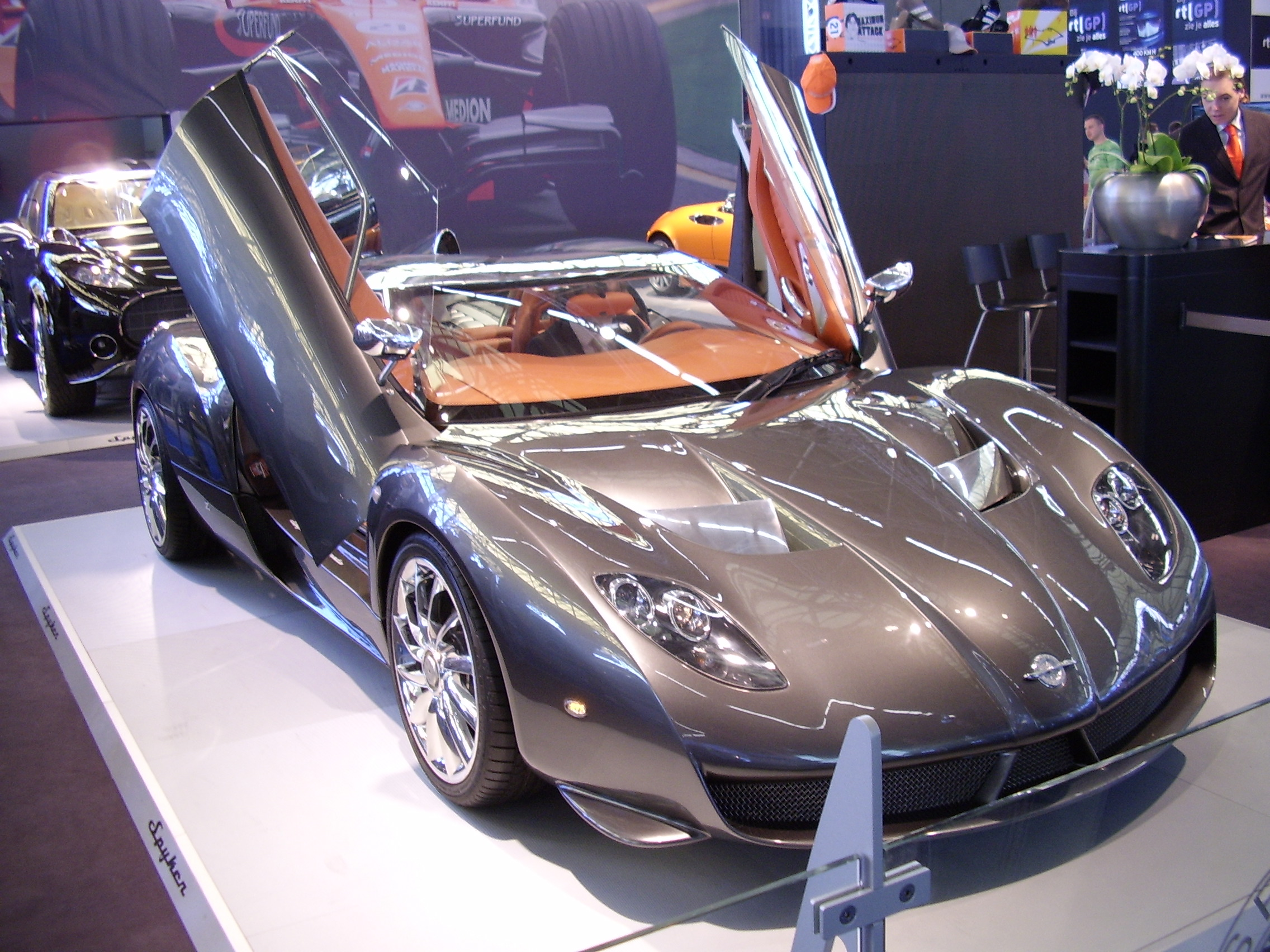
Spyker C12 Zagato

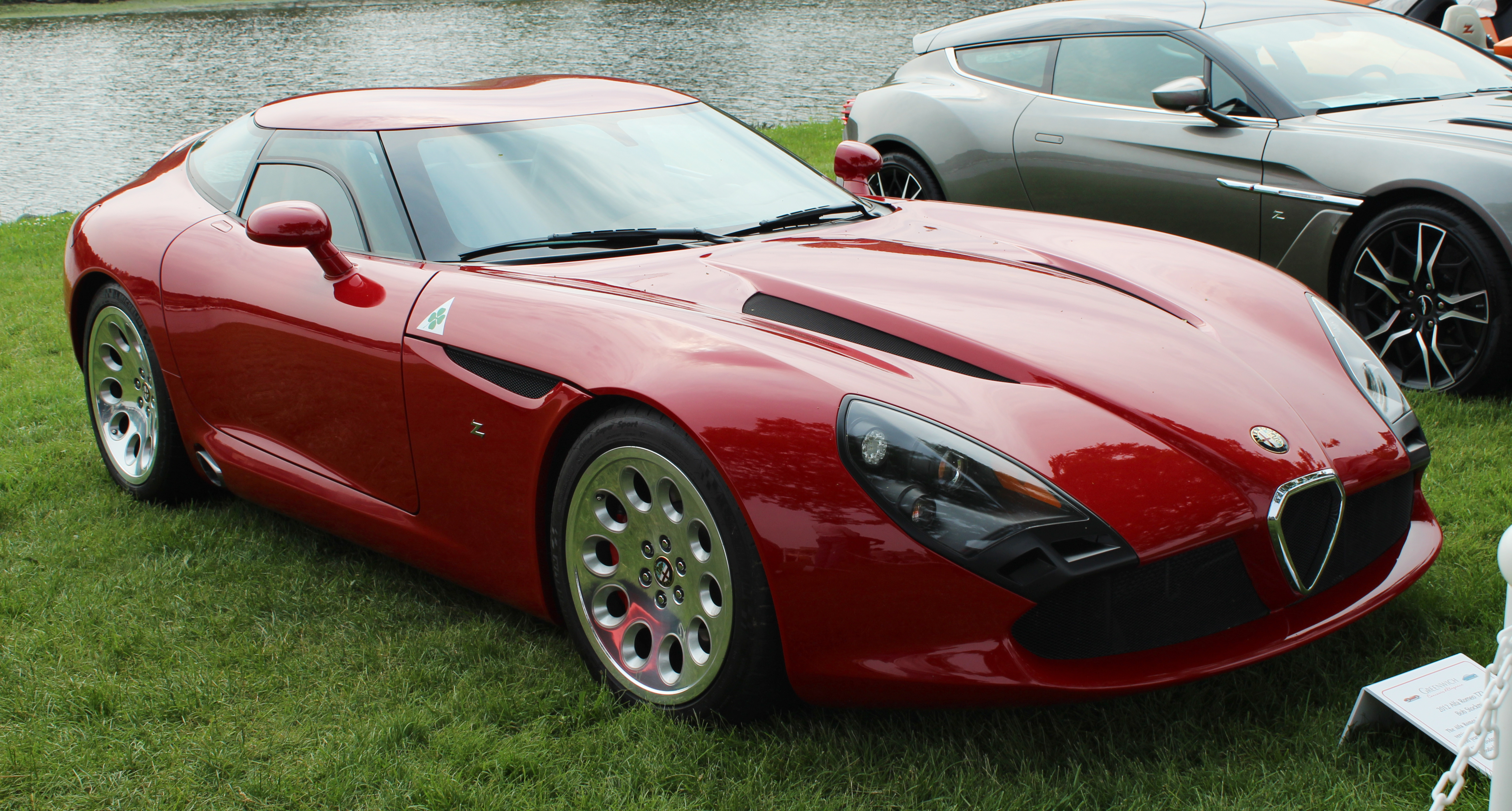
2012 Alfa Romeo TZ3 Stradale

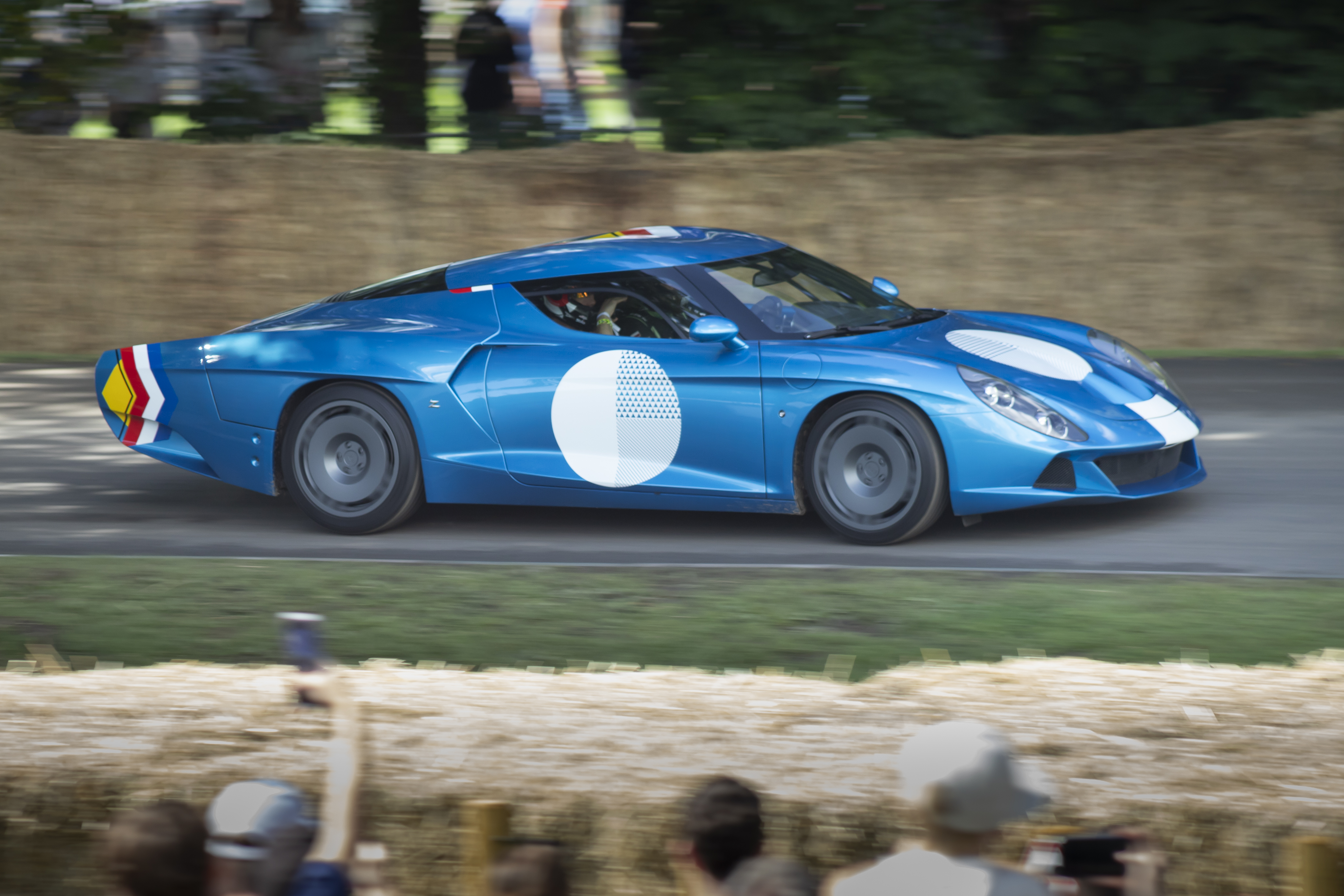
2024 Zagato AGTZ Twin Tail

- 1922: Fiat 501
- 1922: Diatto Tipo 25 4DS
- 1925: Lancia Lambda
- 1929: Alfa Romeo 6C 1500
- 1929: Alfa Romeo 6C 1750 GS
- 1929: Maserati Tipo V4
- 1930: Alfa Romeo 6C 1750 GS Testa Fissa
- 1932: Maserati Tipo V5
- 1932: Alfa Romeo 6C 1750
- 1932: Alfa Romeo 8C 2300
- 1937: Alfa Romeo 8C 2900
- 1938: Fiat 1500 Spider MM
- 1938: Fiat 500 Siata
- 1938: Lancia Aprilia Sport MM
- 1938: Lancia Aprilia Sport Aerodinamica
- 1947: Fiat 500 B Panoramica
- 1947: Isotta Fraschini 8C Monterosa
- 1948: Ferrari 166 MM Panoramica
- 1949: Maserati A6 1500 Panoramica
- 1952: Fiat 500 "Topolino" CZ
- 1952: Fiat 8V Zagato
- 1953: Osca 4500 Biondetti
- 1954: Maserati A6G/54 2000 Zagato Berlinetta
- 1955: Alfa Romeo 1900C SS Zagato Coupe
- 1955: Maserati A6G/54 2000 Zagato Spyder (one-off)
- 1956: Ferrari 250 GT Berlinetta Zagato
- 1956: Maserati A6G/54 2000 Zagato Coupé Speciale (one-off)
- 1956: Fiat Abarth 750 GT
- 1956: Alfa Romeo Giulietta SVZ
- 1957: Alfa Romeo Giulietta SZ
- 1957: Jaguar XK 140 Z
- 1957: Lancia Appia GT
- 1957: Maserati 450S Costin Coupé (Zagato bodied)
- 1958: AC Ace-Bristol Zagato
- 1958: Lancia Flaminia Sport
- 1960: Fiat Abarth 1000
- 1960: Aston Martin DB4 GT Zagato
- 1960: Bristol 406
- 1961: Bristol 407
- 1962: Osca 1600 GTZ
- 1962: Alfa Romeo 2600 SZ
- 1962: Lancia Flaminia Tubolare
- 1962: Lancia Flavia Sport
- 1963: Alfa Romeo Giulia TZ
- 1964: Lancia Flaminia Super Sport
- 1965: Alfa Romeo Gran Sport Quattroruote
- 1965: Lamborghini 3500 GTZ
- 1966: Lancia Fulvia Sport
- 1967: Lancia Flavia Super Sport
- 1967: Shelby Zagato
- 1969: Alfa Romeo Junior Z
- 1969: Volvo GTZ
- 1970: Volvo GTZ 3000
- 1970: Cadillac Eldorado NART
- 1972: Iso Varedo
- 1972: Alfa Romeo 1600 Junior Z
- 1972: Fiat Zagato Aster
- 1974: Zagato Zele 1000
- 1975: Bristol 412
- 1976: Lancia Beta Spider (Designed by Pininfarina, Zagato bodied)
- 1984: Maserati Spyder
- 1986: Aston Martin V8 Zagato
- 1988: Autech Stelvio
- 1988: Maserati Karif (Zagato bodied)
- 1989: Alfa Romeo SZ (Zagato bodied)
- 1991: Ferrari 348 Zagato Elaborazione
- 1991: Autech Gavia
- 1992: Alfa Romeo RZ (Zagato bodied)
- 1992: Lancia Hyena
- 1992: Fiat 500 Z-ECO
- 1993: F.I.V.E Formula Junior Elettrosolare
- 1993: Ferrari FZ93 (Renamed ES1)
- 1996: Fiat Bravobis
- 1996: Zagato Raptor
- 1997: Lamborghini Canto
- 1998: Audi Zuma
- 2001: Alfa Romeo 147 Spider Concept Zagato
- 2002: Alfa Romeo 147 GTA.Z
- 2002: Aston Martin DB7 Zagato
- 2003: Aston Martin DB AR1
- 2004: Aston Martin Vanquish Zagato Roadster
- 2004: Lancia Fulvia Sport Concept
- 2005: Lancia Ypsilon Sport
- 2006: Ferrari 575 GTZ
- 2006: Toyota Harrier Zagato
- 2007: Maserati GS Zagato
- 2007: Zagato 599 GTZ Nibbio
- 2007: Zagato 599 GTZ Nibbio Spyder
- 2008: Spyker C12 Zagato
- 2008: Bentley Continental GTZ
- 2008: Diatto Ottovù Zagato
- 2008: Perana Z-One
- 2009: Ferrari 550 GTZ Barchetta
- 2010: Alfa Romeo TZ3 Corsa
- 2011: Fiat 500 Coupe
- 2011: Alfa Romeo TZ3 Stradale
- 2011: Aston Martin V12 Zagato
- 2012: AC 378 GT Zagato
- 2012: BMW Zagato Coupe
- 2012: BMW Zagato Roadster
- 2013: Aston Martin DBS Coupe Zagato Centennial
- 2013: Aston Martin DB9 Spyder Zagato Centennial
- 2013: Porsche Carrera GTZ
- 2014: Lamborghini 5-95 Zagato
- 2014: Aston Martin Virage Zagato Shooting Brake
- 2015: Thunder Power Sedan
- 2015: Zagato Maserati Mostro
- 2016: Aston Martin Vanquish Zagato
- 2016: MV Agusta F4Z
- 2017: IsoRivolta Zagato Vision Gran Turismo
- 2017: Aston Martin Vanquish Zagato Volante
- 2018: Aston Martin Vanquish Zagato Speedster
- 2018: Aston Martin Vanquish Zagato Shooting Brake
- 2018: Lamborghini L595 Zagato Roadster
- 2020: Aston Martin DBS GT Zagato Centenary
- 2020: IsoRivolta GTZ
- 2022: Zagato Maserati Mostro Barchetta
- 2023: Alfa Romeo Giulia SWB Zagato
- 2024: Zagato AGTZ Twin Tail
- 2025: Alfa Romeo 8C DoppiaCoda
- 2025: Bovensiepen Zagato
- 2025: Capricorn 01 Zagato

== Notable designers ==
- Ugo Zagato
- Vieri Rapi (1947–1950)
- Ercole Spada (1960–1969; 1992)
- Giuseppe Mittino (1970–1987)
- Marco Pedracini (1990–1998)
- Norihiko Harada (1996–present)

== See also ==
- List of Italian companies
