= Zagato Raptor =

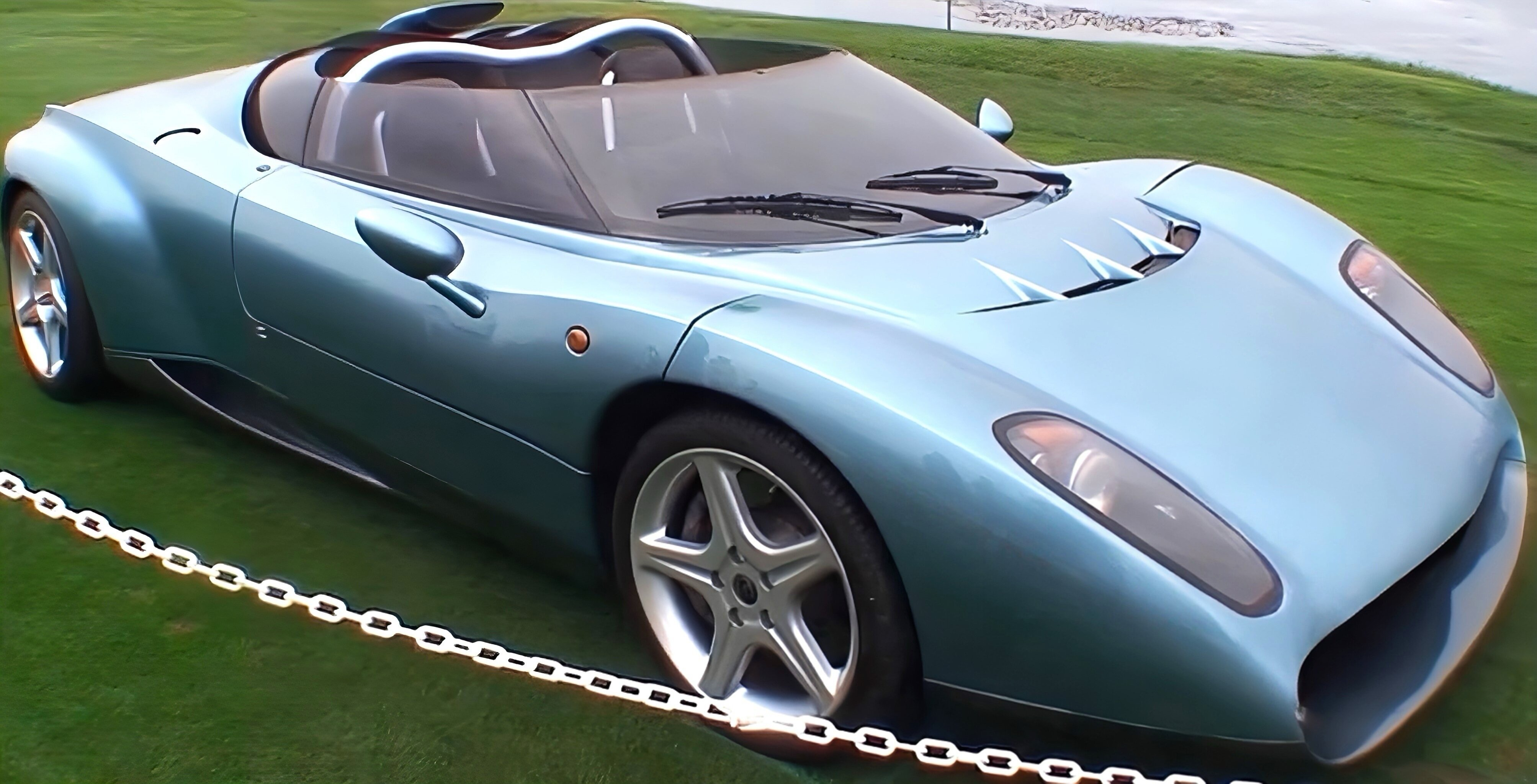

Overview
- Production: 1996 (1 produced)
- Designer: Norihiko Harada at Zagato

Body and chassis
- Class: Sports car (S); Concept car
- Body style: coupé
- Layout: Longitudinal rear-mid-engine, all-wheel-drive
- Doors: Canopy
- Related: Lamborghini Diablo VT

Powertrain
- Engine: 5.7 L Lamborghini V12
- Transmission: 5-speed manual

The Zagato Raptor, sometimes referred to as the Lamborghini Raptor, is a concept car design created in 1996 by Zagato in partnership with Alain Wicki for Lamborghini. The body features the Zagato "double bubble" design and an innovative door design where the whole middle section of the car swivels up and forward. The chassis is borrowed from a 4WD Lamborghini Diablo. The design was completed and a sample vehicle displayed at the Geneva Auto Show in 1996. At the time of showing, it was believed that the car was ready for production.

Utilizing the drivetrain and 492 hp (367 kW) V12 engine from the Diablo, but eliminating the Anti-lock braking system (ABS) and traction control system, as well as the extensive use of carbon fiber for the body work made the vehicle significantly lighter than the Diablo, thus potentially faster. To make up for the lack of ABS and the higher potential speeds, an upgrade from the Diablo's braking system was used.

Most media sources speculated that it would have been an excellent car to bridge the gap between the Diablo and its successor, then called the Canto, but Lamborghini did not produce the Raptor. Alain Wicki briefly tried to develop it on his own with Zagato's help, but nothing became of his efforts. He owned the only prototype until 2000, when it was auctioned at the Geneva Auto Show and bought by a private car collector.
