= AC 378 GT Zagato =

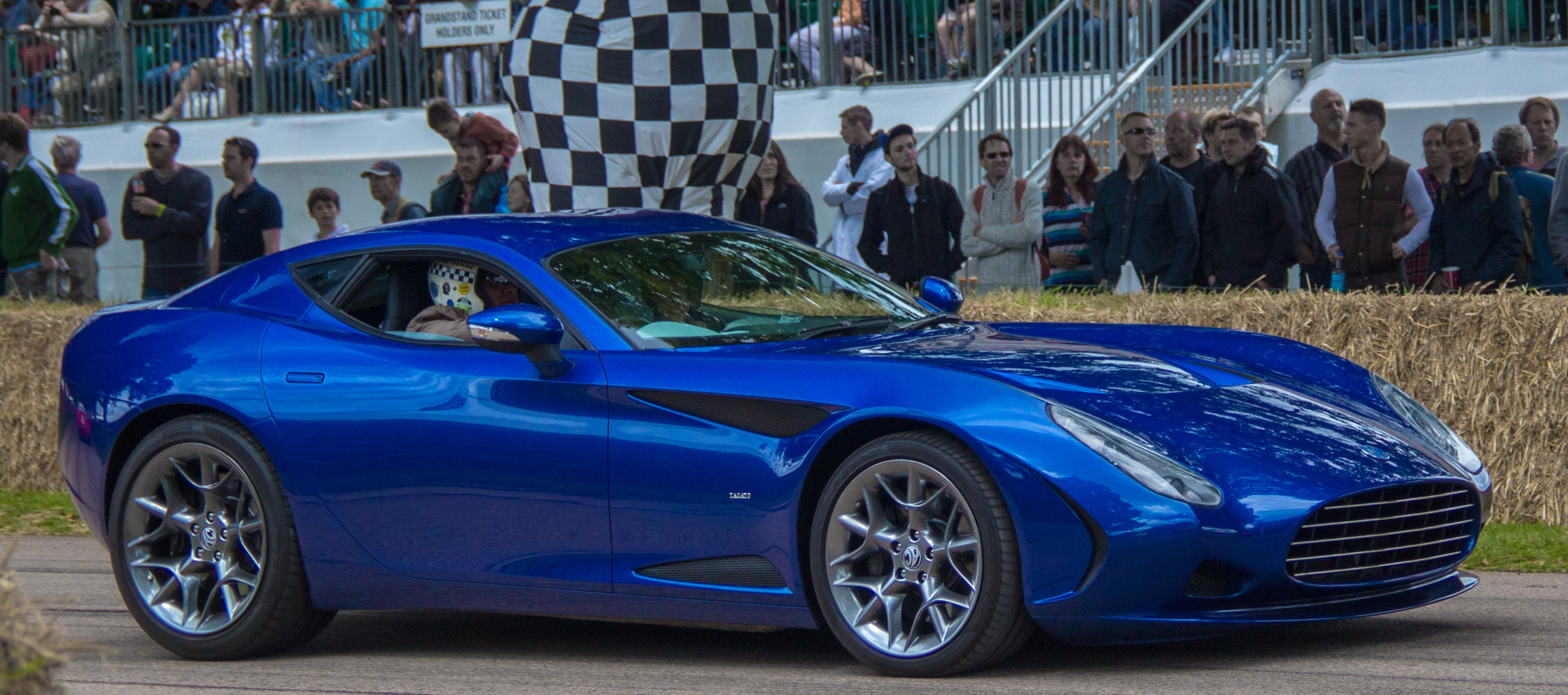
- AC 378 GT Zagato at the 2012 Goodwood Festival of Speed

Overview
- Manufacturer: AC Cars
- Also called: Perana Z-One
- Production: 2012 (Prototype)
- Assembly: Hi-Tech Automotive, Gqeberha, South Africa
- Designer: Zagato

Body and chassis
- Class: Sports car (S)
- Body style: 2-door fastback coupé
- Layout: front engine, rear wheel drive

Powertrain
- Engine: 6.2 L GM LS3 V8
- Transmission: 6 speed manual

Dimensions
- Kerb weight: 1,465 kg (3,230 lb)

The AC 378 GT Zagato is a sports car designed by the Italian design company Zagato and built in South Africa by Hi-Tech Automotive. It was unveiled at the 2012 Geneva Motor Show. The design of the 378 GT was previewed in 2009 as the Perana Z-One, and was later badged as an AC Cars product. Sales were expected to commence by the end of 2012.

The car is powered by a 437 bhp (326 kW; 443 PS) 6.2 L V8 GM-sourced engine found in the Chevrolet Camaro. Weighing 1,465 kg (3,230 lb), the car has a 0-100 km/h (62 mph) acceleration time of 3.9 seconds and a top speed of around 298 km/h. The car does not feature any electronic driver aids.

The car was priced at around €109,990 for the coupe version.

== History ==
In February 2009, the South African company Perana presented the result of its cooperation with the Italian design studio Zagato, a small sports car with a coupé body. Named the Perana Z-One, it was officially presented at the 2009 Geneva Motor Show.

The styling of the Z-One was described by the manufacturer as a combination of futurism, lightness and aerodynamics. The car received a characteristic, slim silhouette with a flat, elongated front and muscular rear wheel arches. Typically for cars designed by Zagato, the front fascia was decorated with a low, rounded radiator grille with a structure of chrome, horizontal bars.

The car is powered by a 6.2-liter LS3 V8 with 440 hp (328 kW) and 583 N⋅m (430 lb⋅ft) of maximum torque at 6600 rpm. Weighing less than 1.2 tons, it's estimated to accelerate to 100 km/h (62 mph) in less than 4 seconds. The engine comes from the Chevrolet Corvette C6.

=== Name change ===
Three years after the premiere of the Z-One, Perana Performance Group faced financial difficulties and handed over the project to British company AC Cars. As a result, the car was given a new name, the AC 378 GT Zagato. A characteristic feature of the model after being renamed an AC was the lack of electronic driver assistance systems, aimed at experienced, talented drivers.

=== Sale ===
Sales of the car began in July 2009. Originally, Perana planned to produce a limited number of 999 units at the plant in Port Elizabeth, South Africa, at a price of $70,000 per car. Ultimately, however, only 10 units of the sports model were built under the Perana brand, 7 of which went to customers in the United States. In February 2017, one of them was listed for $125,999 on eBay. After being renamed AC 378 GT Zagato, production continued to be handled by plants belonging to Hi-Tech Automotive in South Africa, but this also failed to be realized on a large scale and after 2012, information about the car ceased.

== Gallery ==
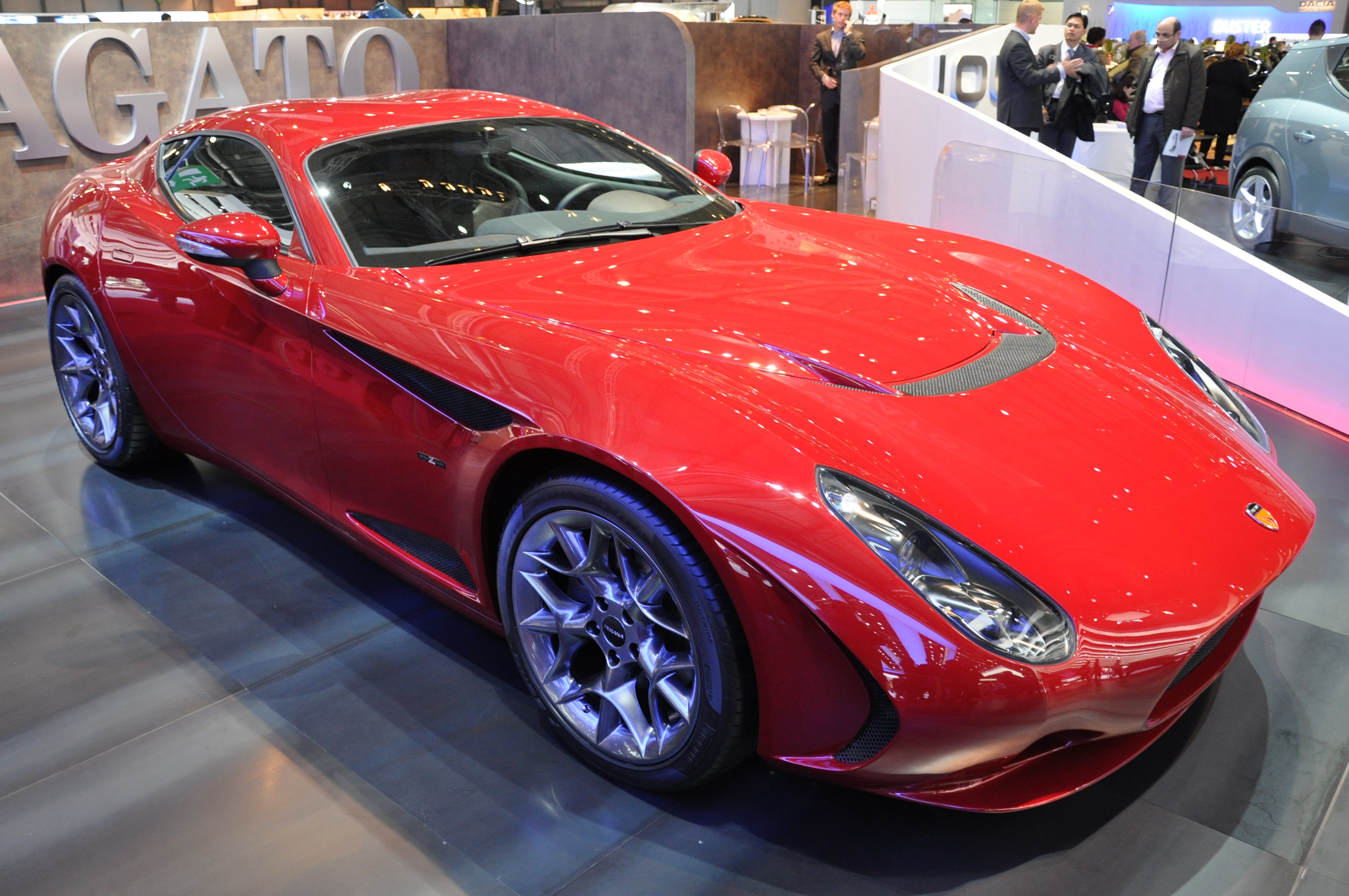
Perana Z-One

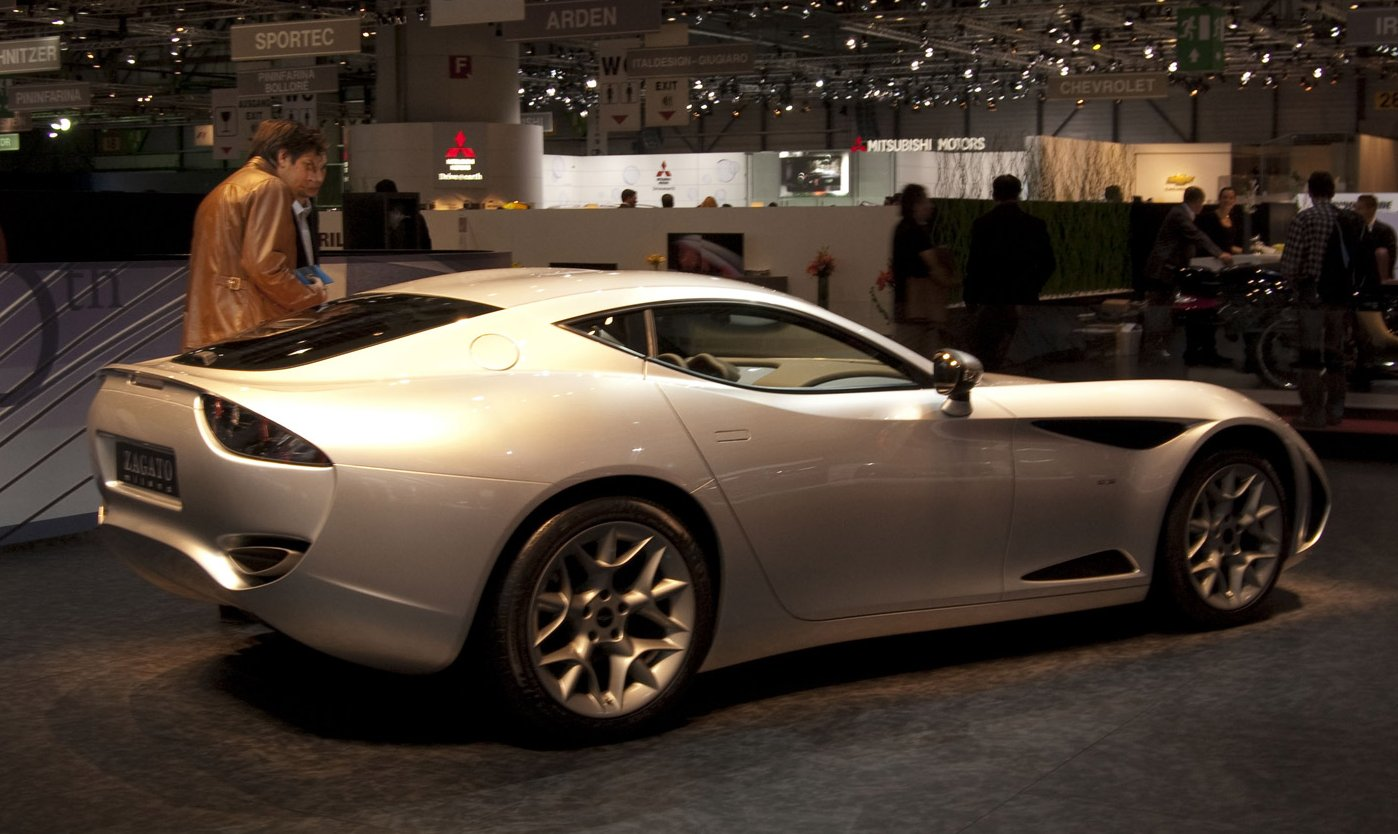
Perana Z-One rear

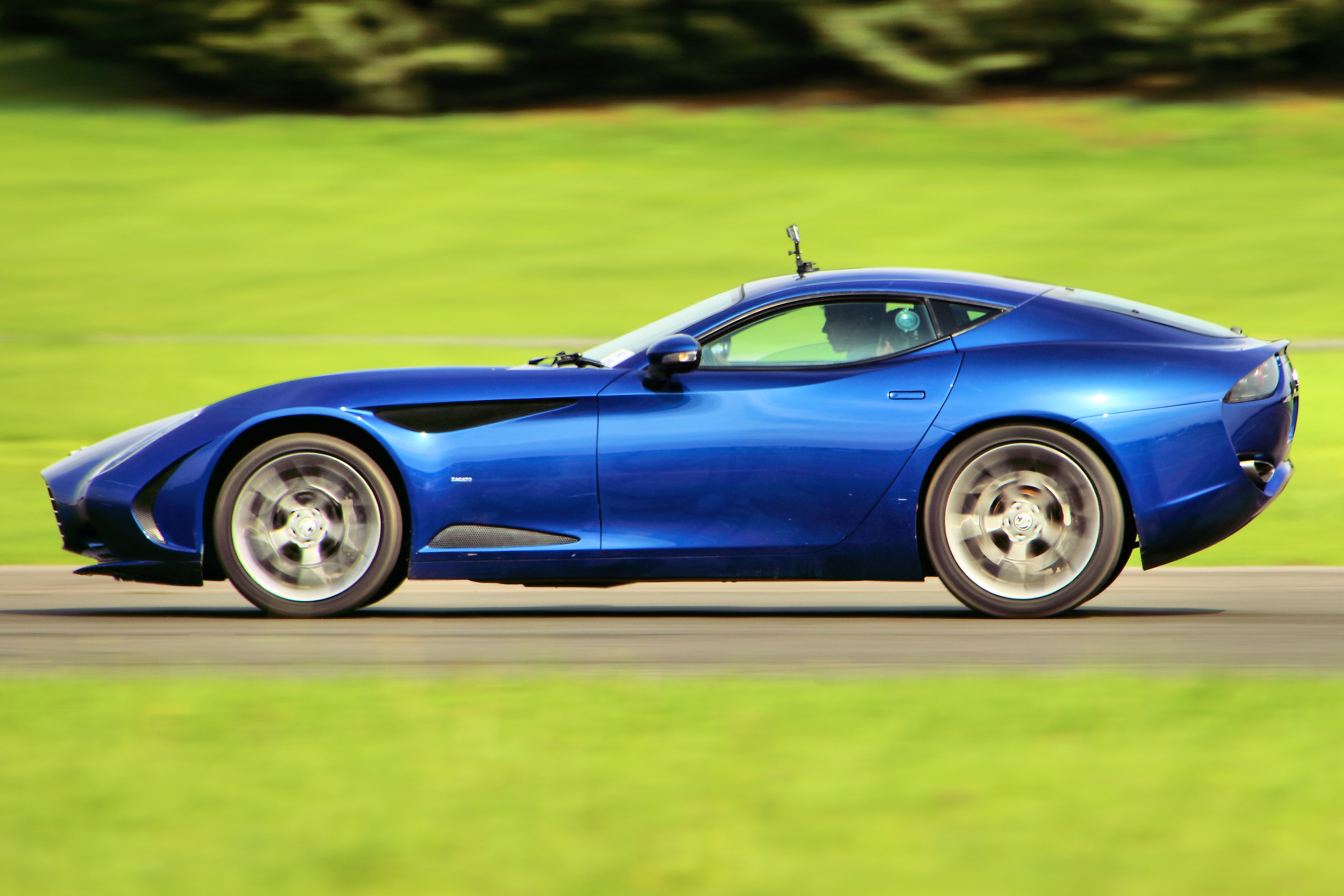
AC 378 GT Zagato side view

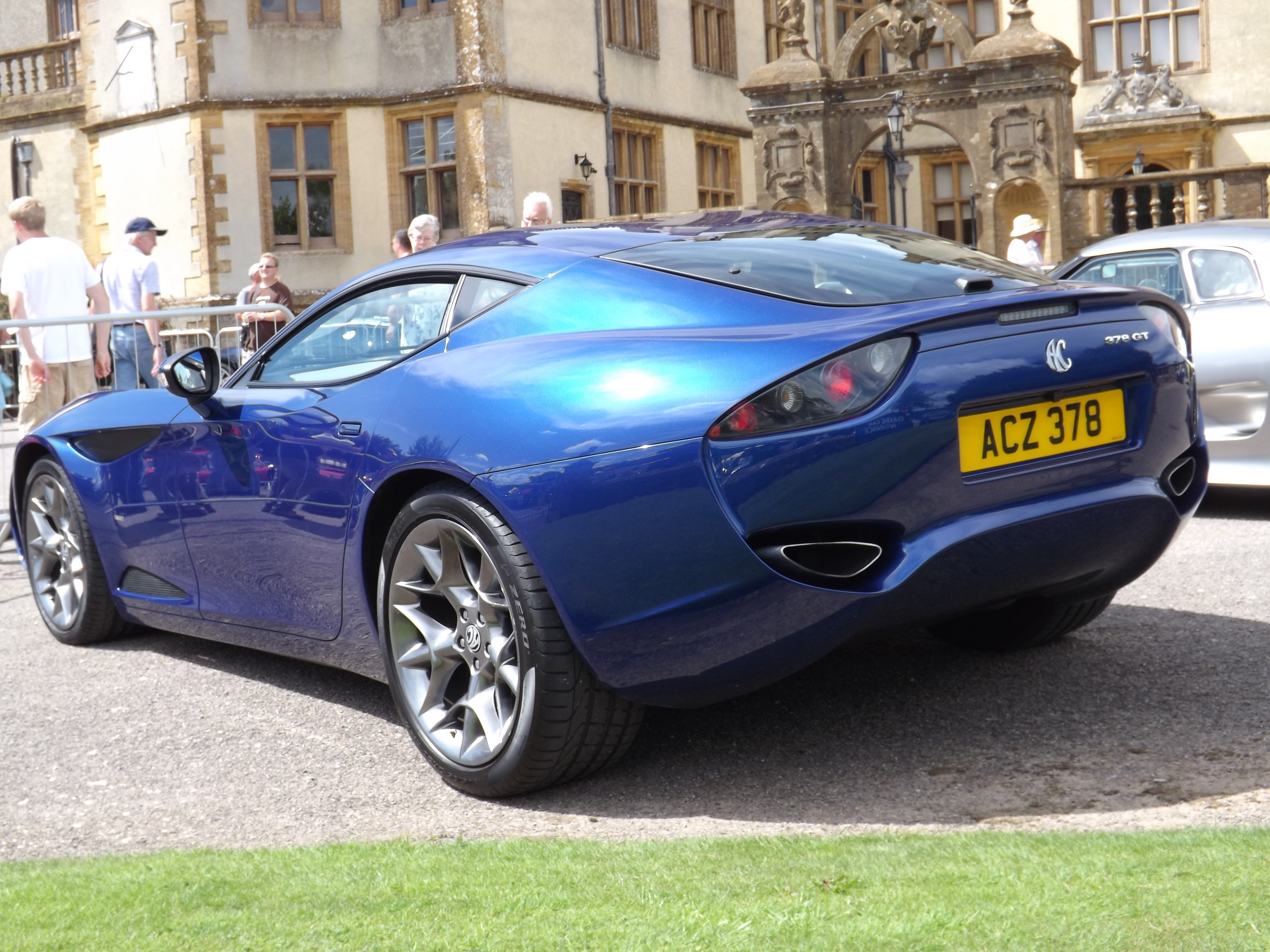
AC 378 GT Zagato rear view
