= Zagato Zele =

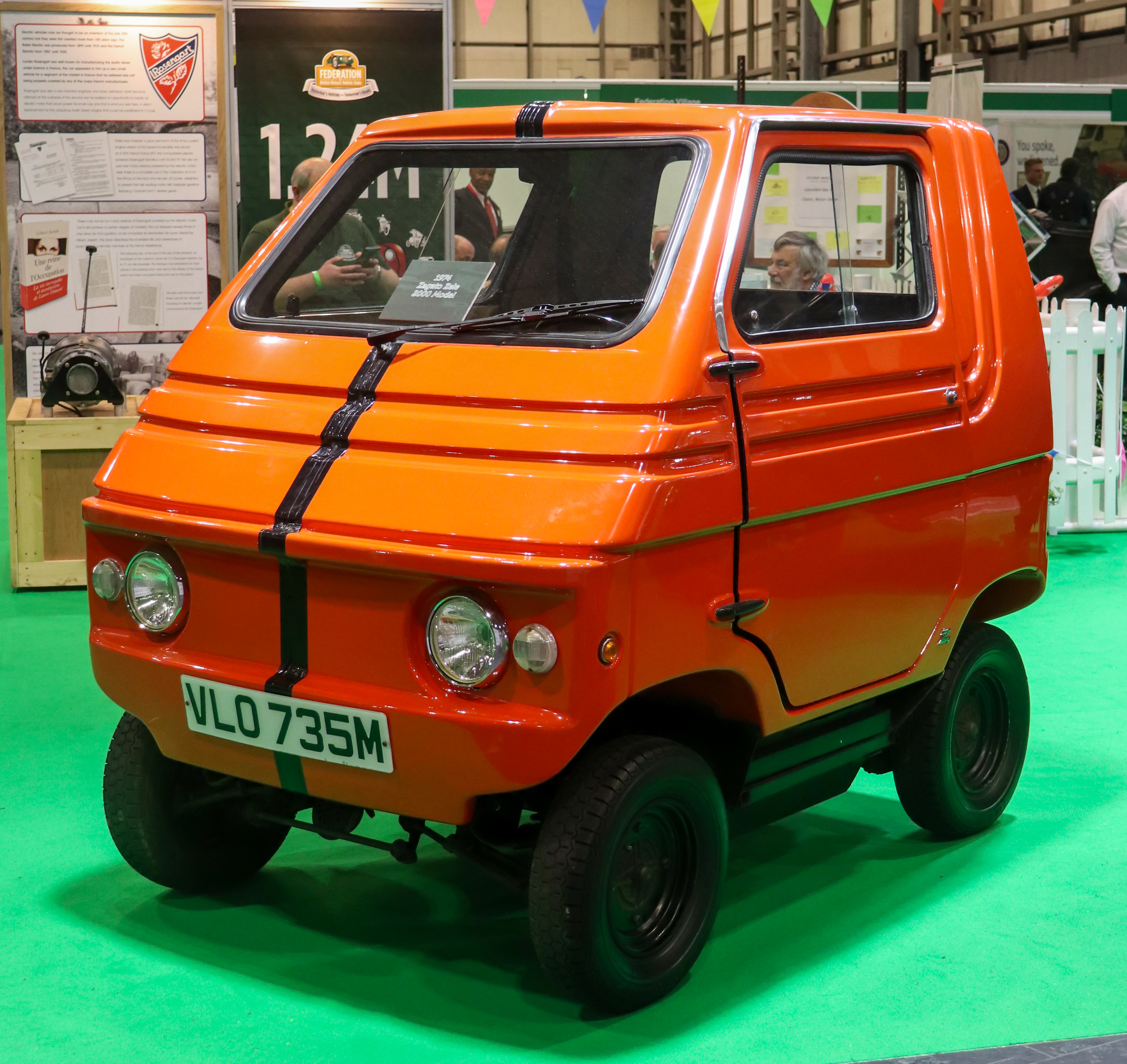

Overview
- Manufacturer: Zagato
- Also called: Zagato Elcar (United States)
- Production: 1974–1976; 500 produced
- Assembly: Italy: Milan

Body and chassis
- Class: Microcar
- Body style: 2-door
- Layout: Rear-engine, rear wheel drive

Powertrain
- Electric motor: Marelli direct drive
- Transmission: Differential
- Battery: 4 x 12v; up to 8 x 12V
- Range: 80 km (50 mi) (Official range)

Dimensions
- Wheelbase: 51 in (1,295.4 mm)
- Length: 84 in (2,133.6 mm)
- Width: 53 in (1,346.2 mm)
- Height: 63.5 in (1,612.9 mm)
- Curb weight: 495 kg (1,091 lb)

The Zagato Zele 1000, 1500, 2000 (sold in the United States as the Elcar) is an electric microcar with a fiberglass body manufactured by the Italian design company Zagato. Produced 1974–1976, the Zele was an unusual departure from Zagato's famous designs, which had long been known for their beauty and performance. The Zele, however, was high, square cornered and had a low top speed. They were produced in 7 colors (Orange-red, Brown, Dark blue, Pastel blue, White, Green and metal flake Blue) and the chassis and suspension were derived from the Fiat 500 and Fiat 124. The 1000, 1500, and 2000 stand for the wattage of the motors respectively. Approximately 500 were made.

The Zele employed a 4 position speed selector and a 2 position foot pedal providing six forward speeds, two reverse speeds and a range of approximately 50 miles (80 km). The Zele 2000 also featured a boost switch which, once at top speed, weakens the motor's magnetic fields in the field coils to produce less torque but a greater top speed. Its top speed was between 25 and 30 mph.

The American importer for the vehicle, Elcar Corporation, also created an elongated four-seat prototype called the Elcar Wagonette.

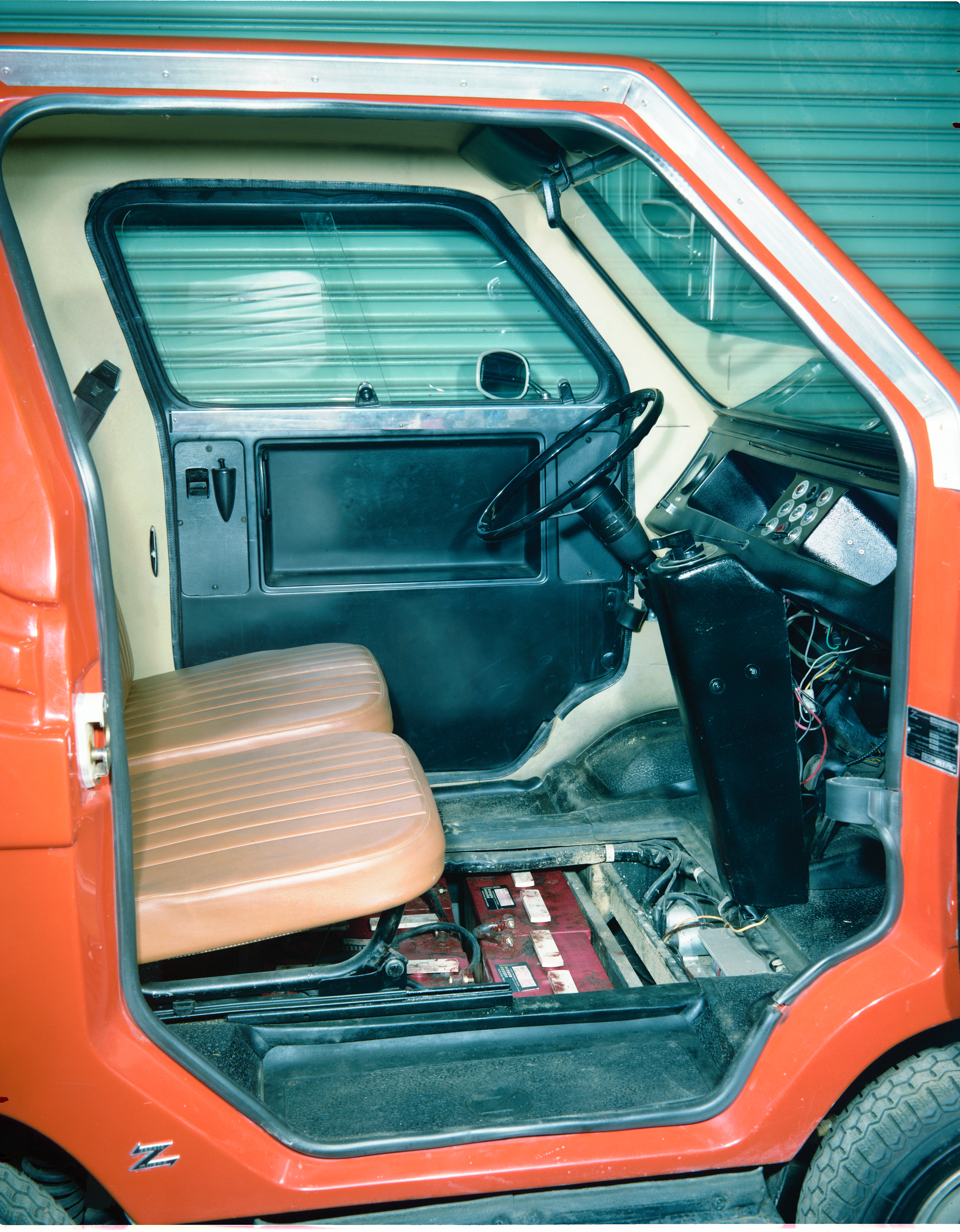
View showing underfloor battery compartment

Side view

== See also ==
- List of modern production plug-in electric vehicles
