= Renault KZ =

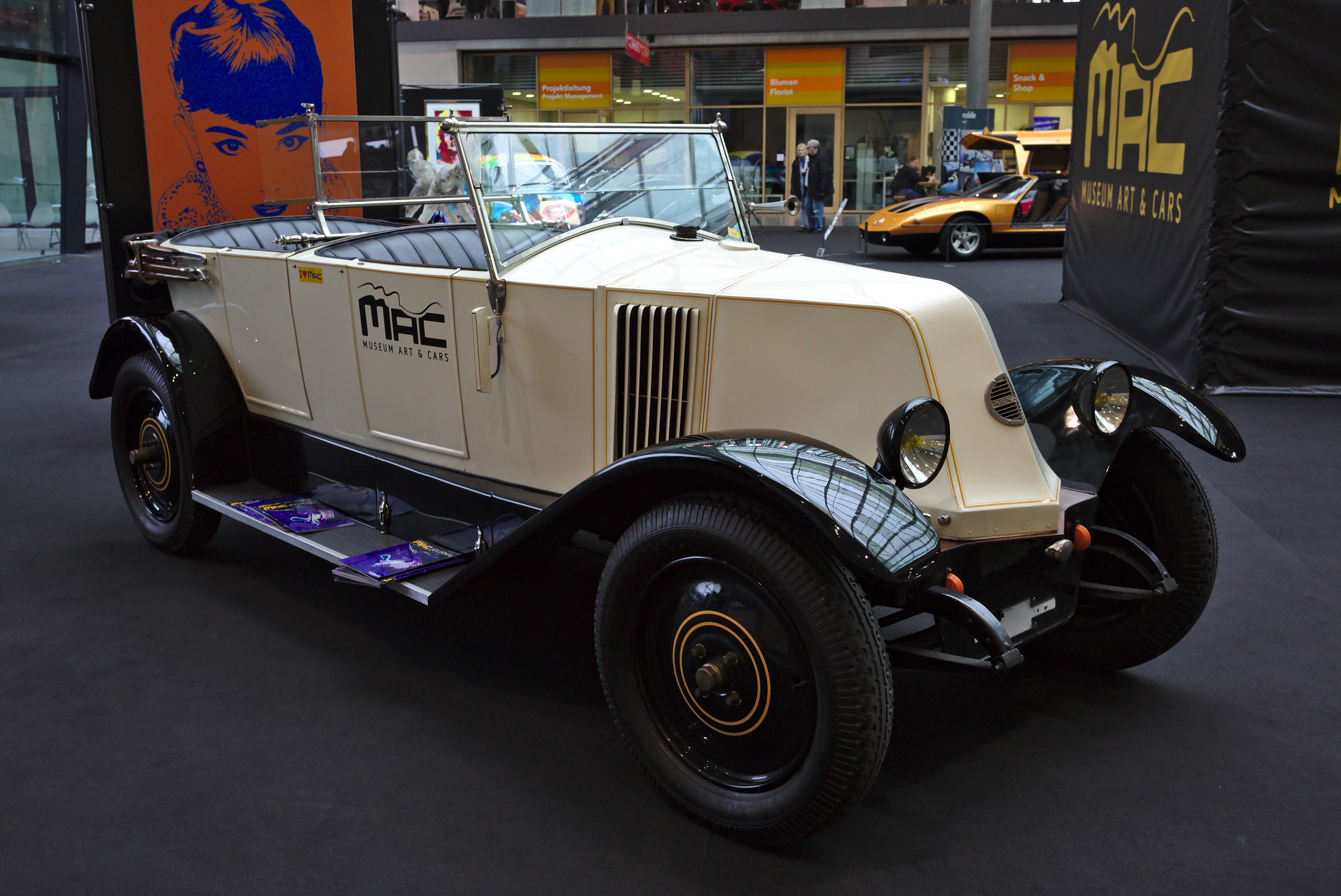

Overview
- Manufacturer: Renault
- Also called: Renault Type KZ; Renault Primaquatre
- Production: 1923–1931
- Assembly: France: Île Seguin, Boulogne-Billancourt, Paris
- Designer: Louis Renault

Body and chassis
- Class: Mid-size / Large family car (D)
- Body style: 4-door Torpedo, 4-door Sedan, 2-door Truck
- Layout: FR

Powertrain
- Engine: 2120 cc I4, 35 hp
- Transmission: 3-speed manual

Dimensions
- Wheelbase: 2,800 mm (110.2 in)
- Length: 3,800 mm (149.6 in)
- Width: 1,640 mm (64.6 in)
- Curb weight: 1,320 kg (2,910 lb)

Chronology
- Predecessor: Renault GS; Renault IG
- Successor: Renault Primaquatre; Renault Vivaquatre

The Renault KZ is a mid-size car or large family car manufactured by Renault from 1923 until 1931.

== Details and Evolutions ==
The KZ was the replacement of the Type GS and the Type IG, and its intention was to be a rival of the Citroën Type C in the class called "populaires" (economic). The car had a 4-cylinder engine of 2120 cc, 33 cm larger than its predecessors.

In 1927 three new models arrived, the KZ1, KZ2, KZ3, 21 cm larger.

In 1929 and 1931 the KZ4 and KZ5 were introduced.

The KZ11, was a taxis G7 company, a special series of 2400 vehicles with new adaptations.

== Types ==
- KZ
- KZ1
- KZ2
- KZ3
- KZ4
- KZ5

== Specification ==
- Speed = 75 km/h
