= Astura =

Astura could refer to:

- Torre Astura, a former island of Lazio, Italy, containing Roman villas
- Astura River, Lazio, Italy
- Esla River, a river of Spain known to the Romans as Astura
- Astura (moth), a synonym for Polygrammodes, a genus of moths of the family Crambidae
- Lancia Astura, a passenger car produced by Italian automobile manufacturer Lancia between 1931 and 1939
