= D-segment =

Car size classification in Europe

2020 Best-Selling

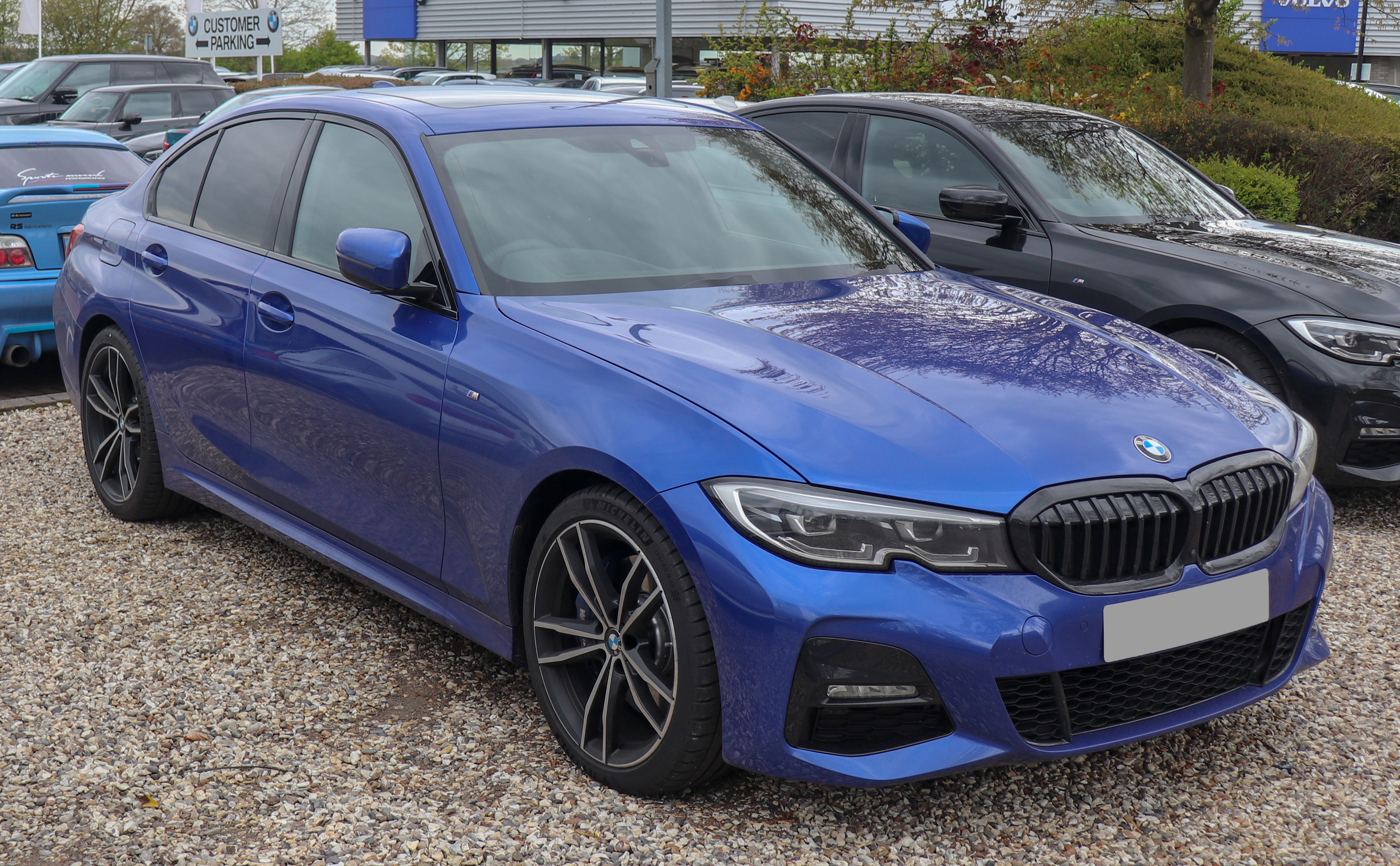
BMW 3 Series 7th generation (2018–present)

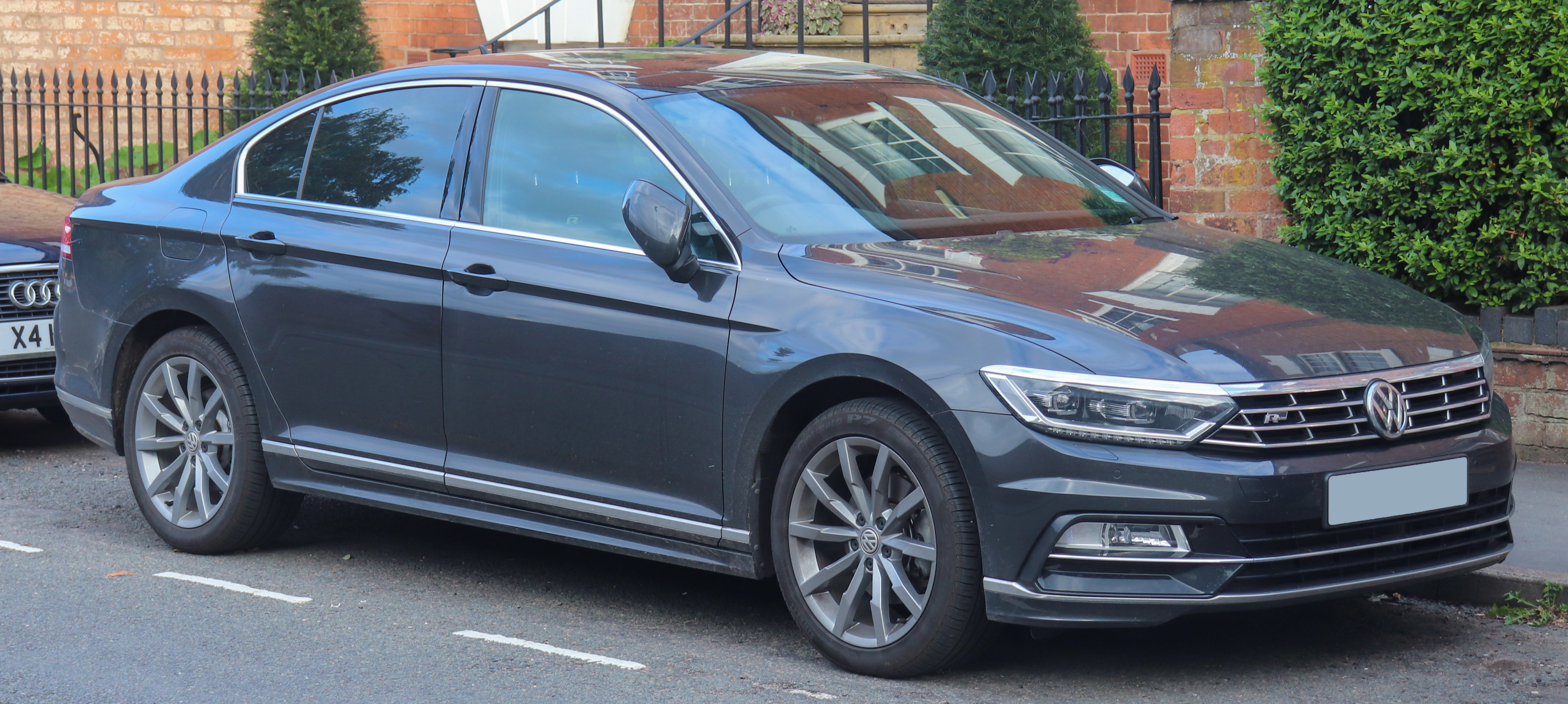
Volkswagen Passat 8th generation (2015–2024)

The D-segment is the 4th category of the European segments for passenger cars, and is described as "large cars".

It is equivalent to the Euro NCAP "large family car" size class, and the present-day definition of the mid-size car category used in North America. Compact executive cars are part of the D-segment size category.

D-segment sales represented about 7% of the market in the 2010s.

== Characteristics ==
Most D-segment cars are sedans/saloons or wagons/estates but hatchbacks, and coupes have been common.

Pricing and specification of D-segment cars can vary greatly, from basic low-cost transport to more luxurious and expensive models. As of 2025 the typical D-segment category size ranges from about 4.6 to 5 m (15.1 to 16.4 ft).

== Current models ==
D-segment cars in Europe are the Alfa Romeo Giulia (2015), BMW 3 Series, Mercedes-Benz C-Class, Audi A4/S4/RS4, Mazda6, Škoda Superb, Volvo S60/V60, Jaguar XE, Citroën C5, Peugeot 508, Audi A5/S5/RS5, BMW 4 Series, Volkswagen Arteon, Honda Accord, Toyota Camry and Polestar 2.

100,000 – 200,000 sales (Best-Selling)

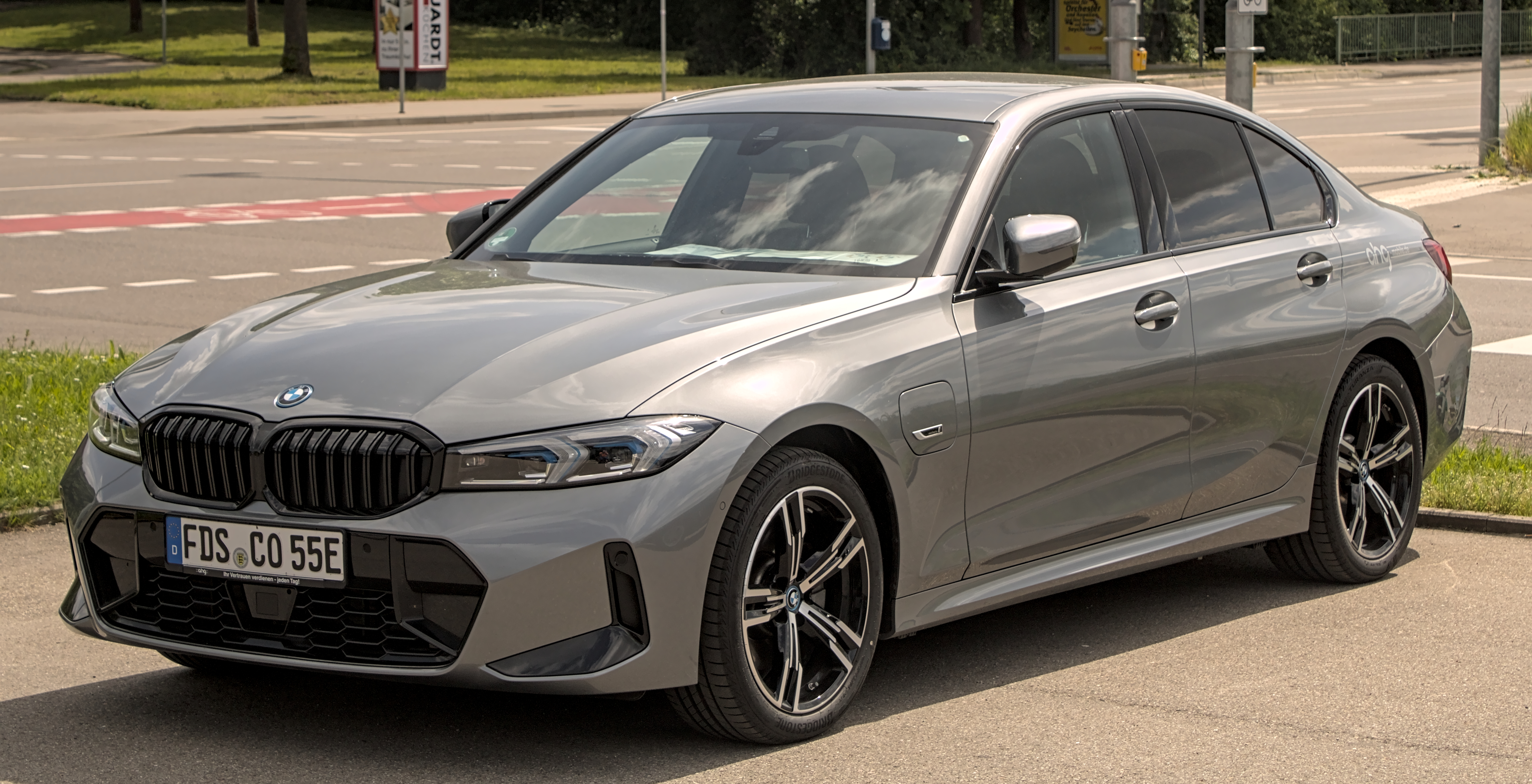
BMW 3 Series
7th generation (2018–present)

50,000 – 100,000 sales

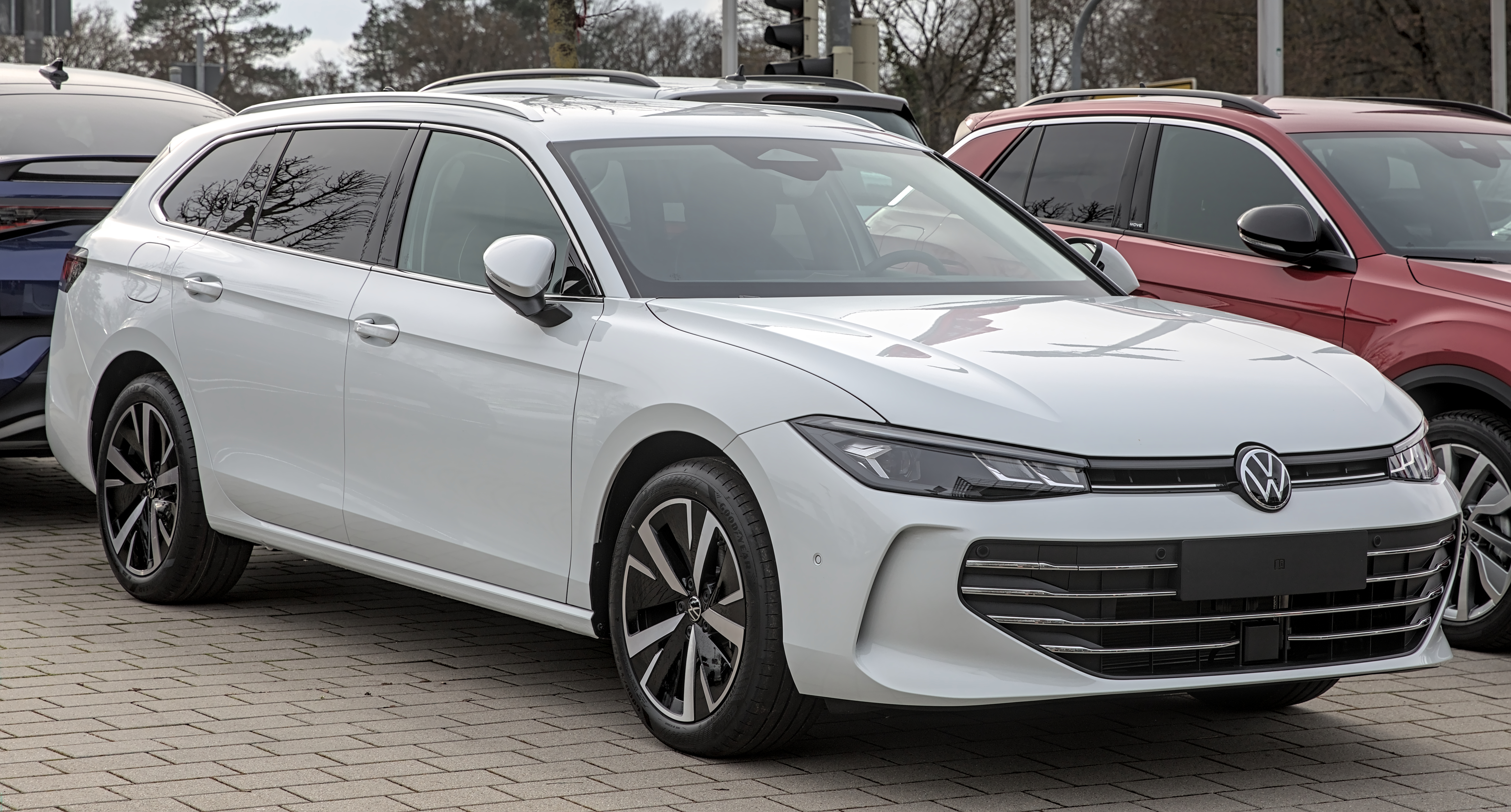
Volkswagen Passat
9th generation (2023–present)

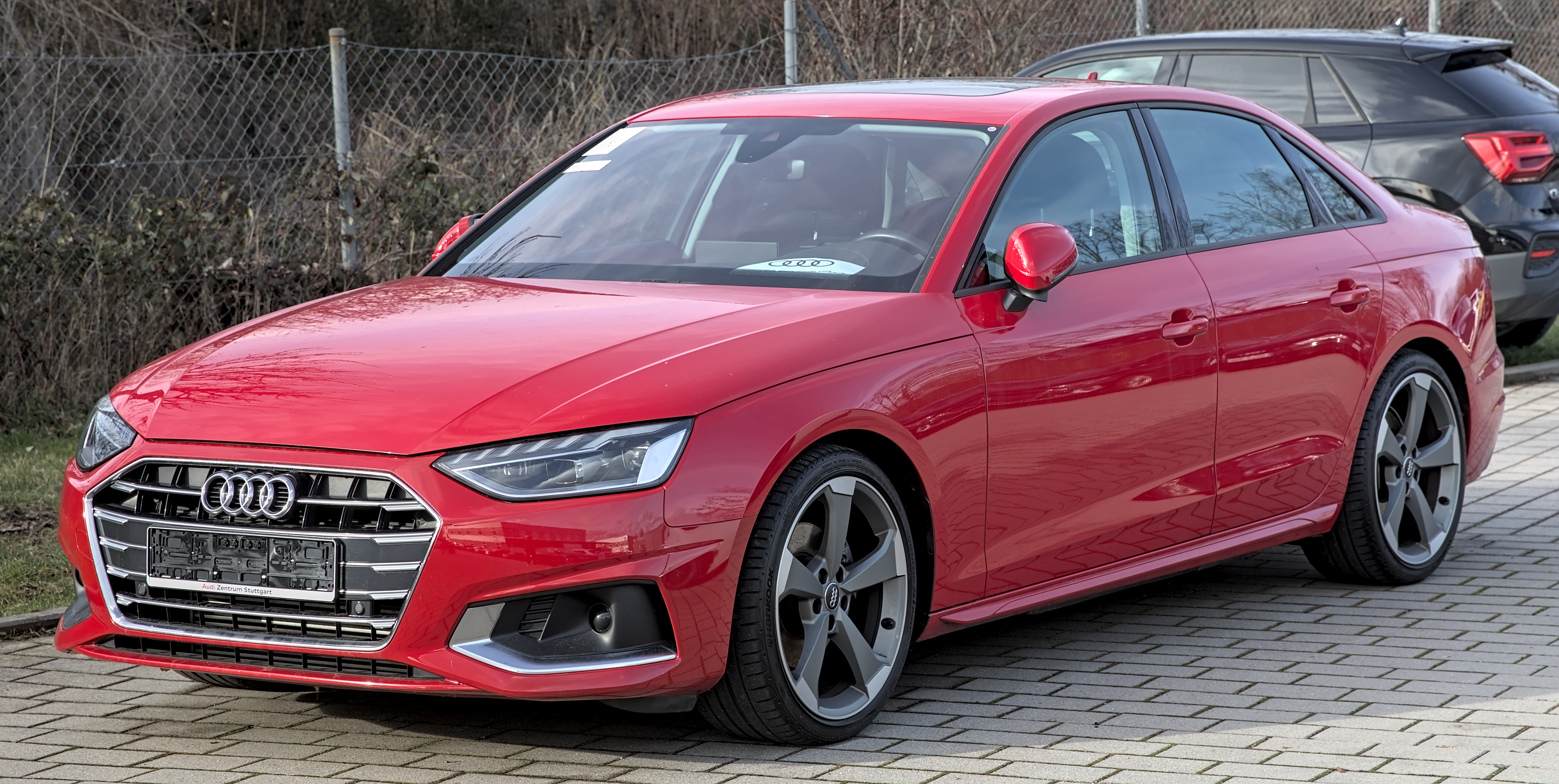
Audi A4
5th generation (2016–2024)

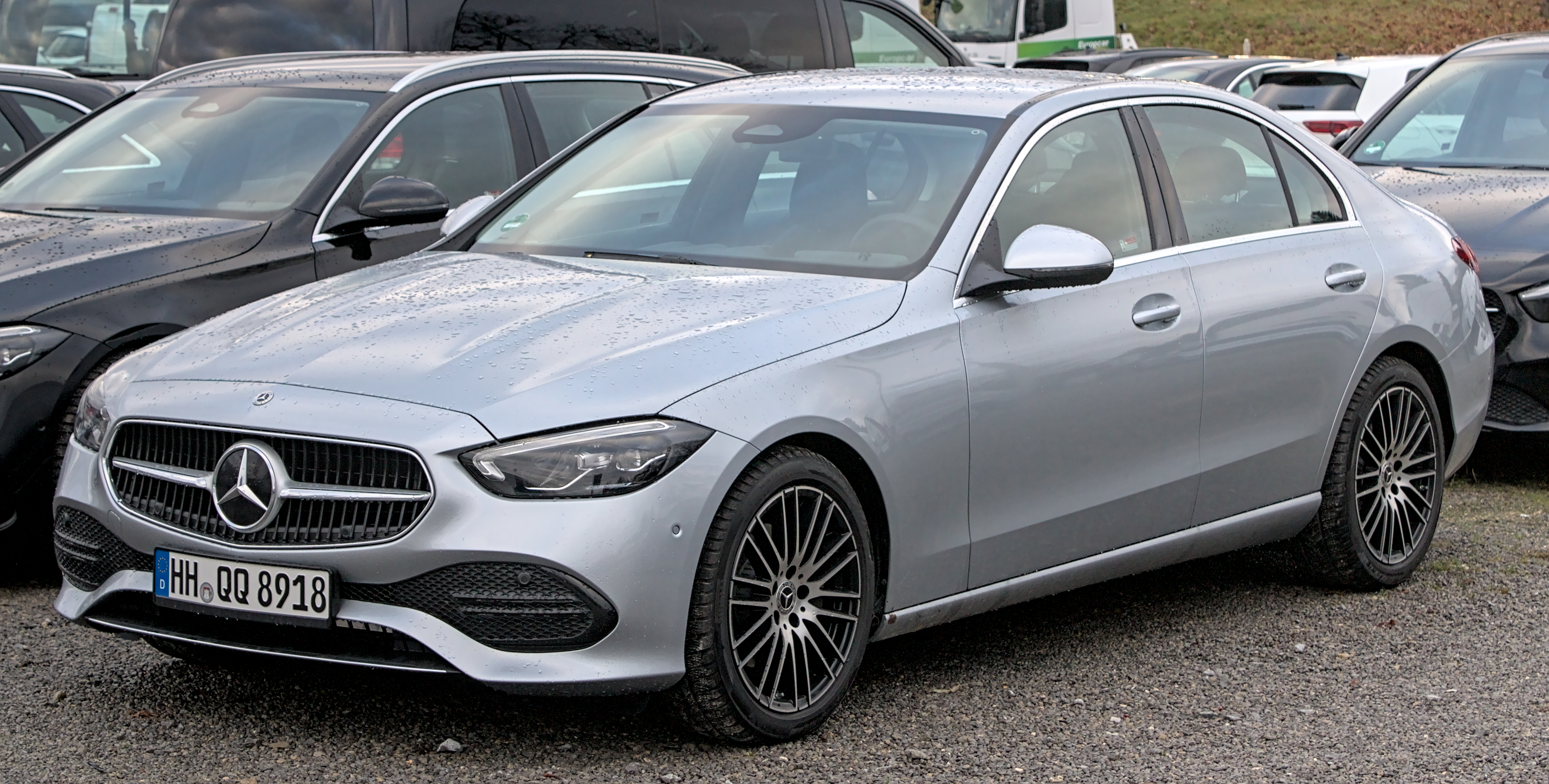
Mercedes-Benz C-Class
5th generation (2021–present)

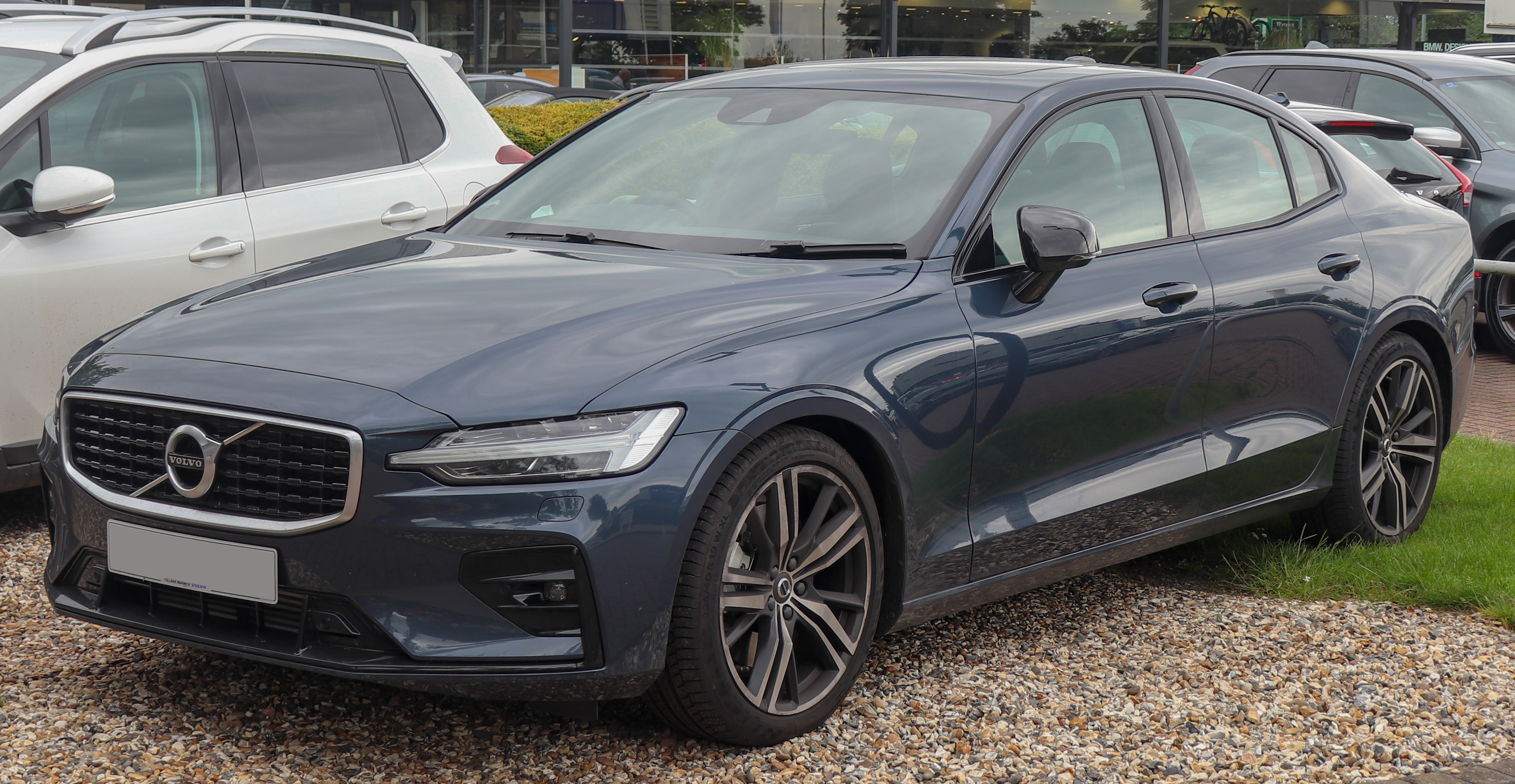
Volvo S60
3rd generation (2019–2025)

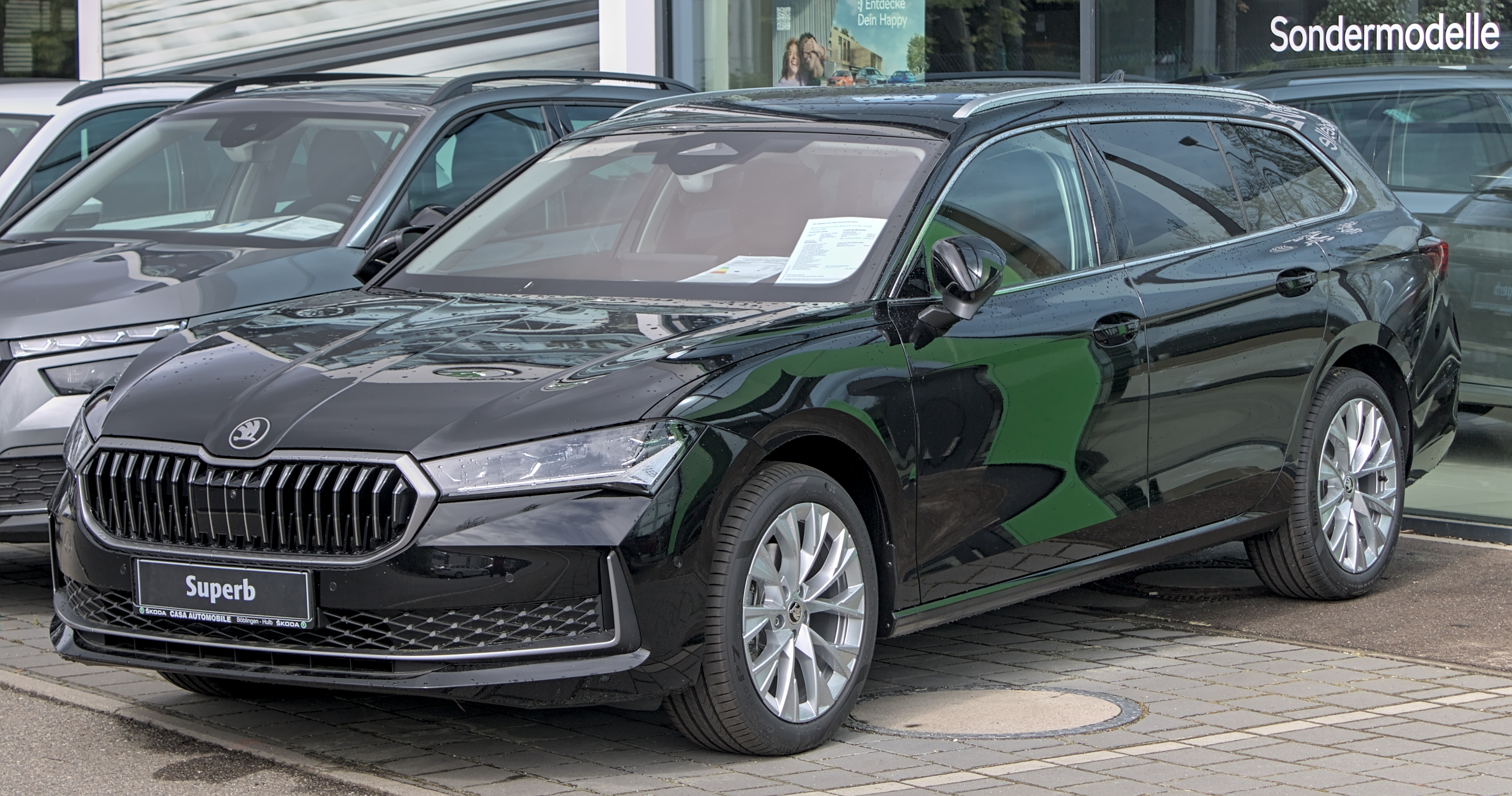
Škoda Superb
4th generation (2023–present)

10,000 – 50,000 sales

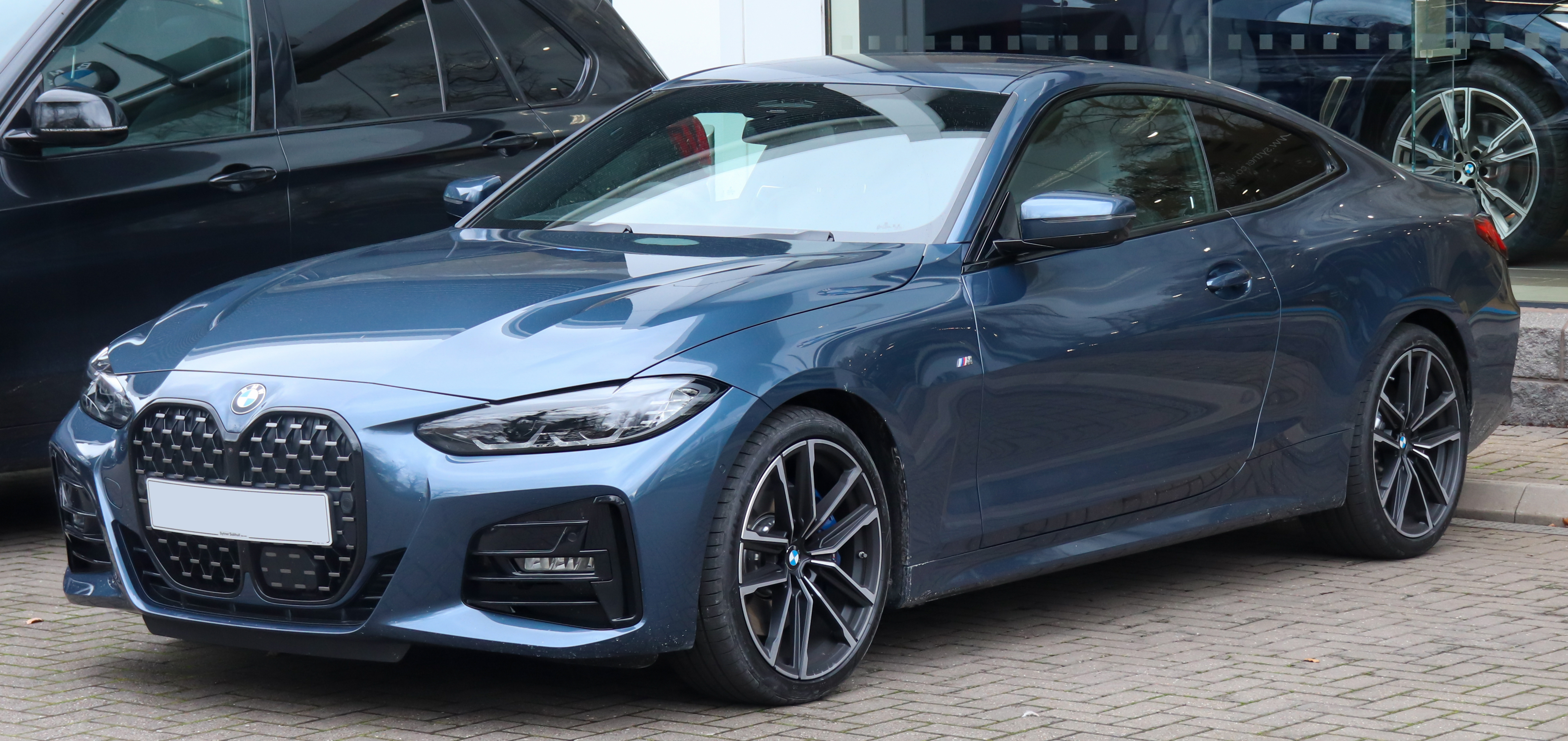
BMW 4 Series
2nd generation (2020–present)

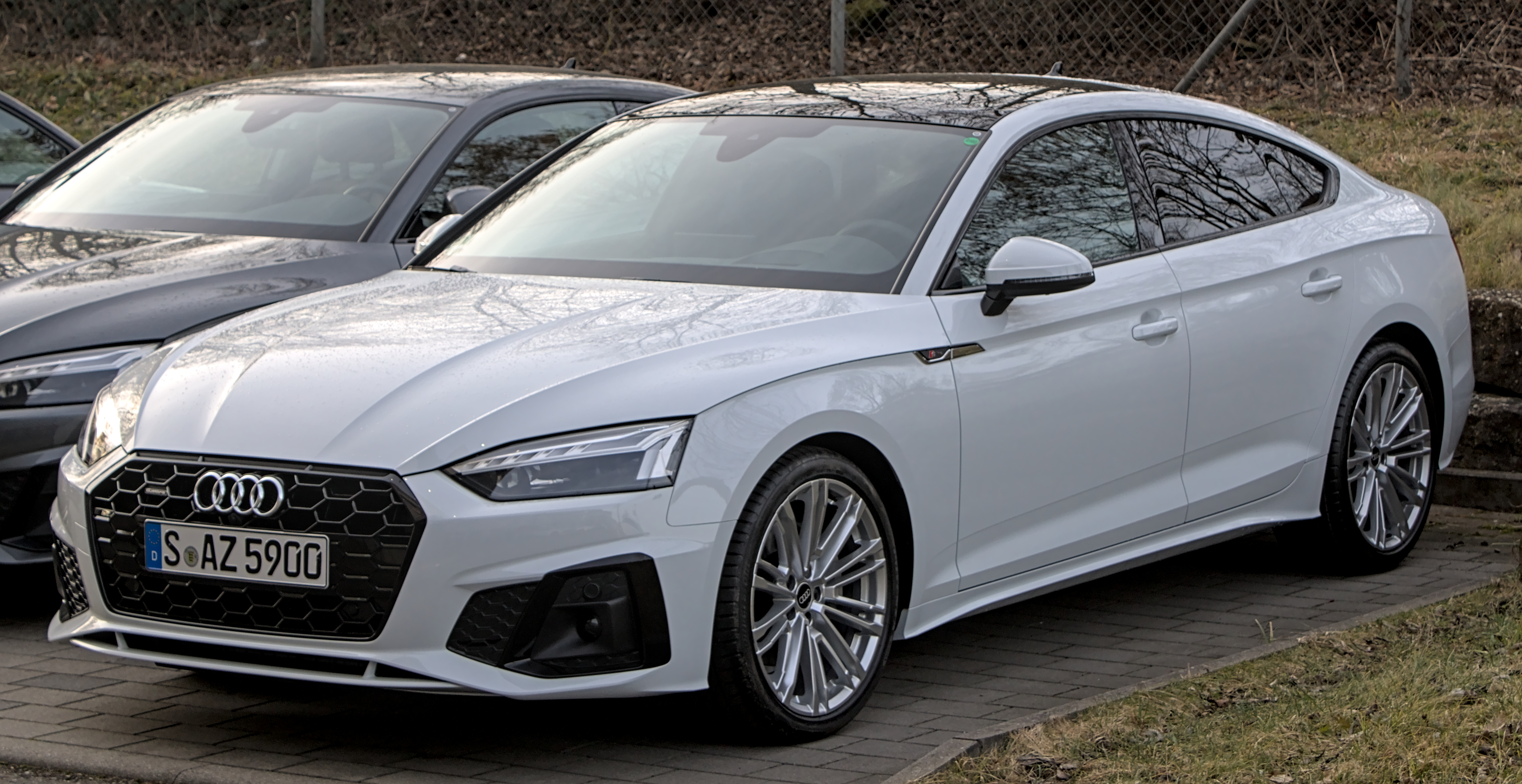
Audi A5
2nd generation (2016–2024)

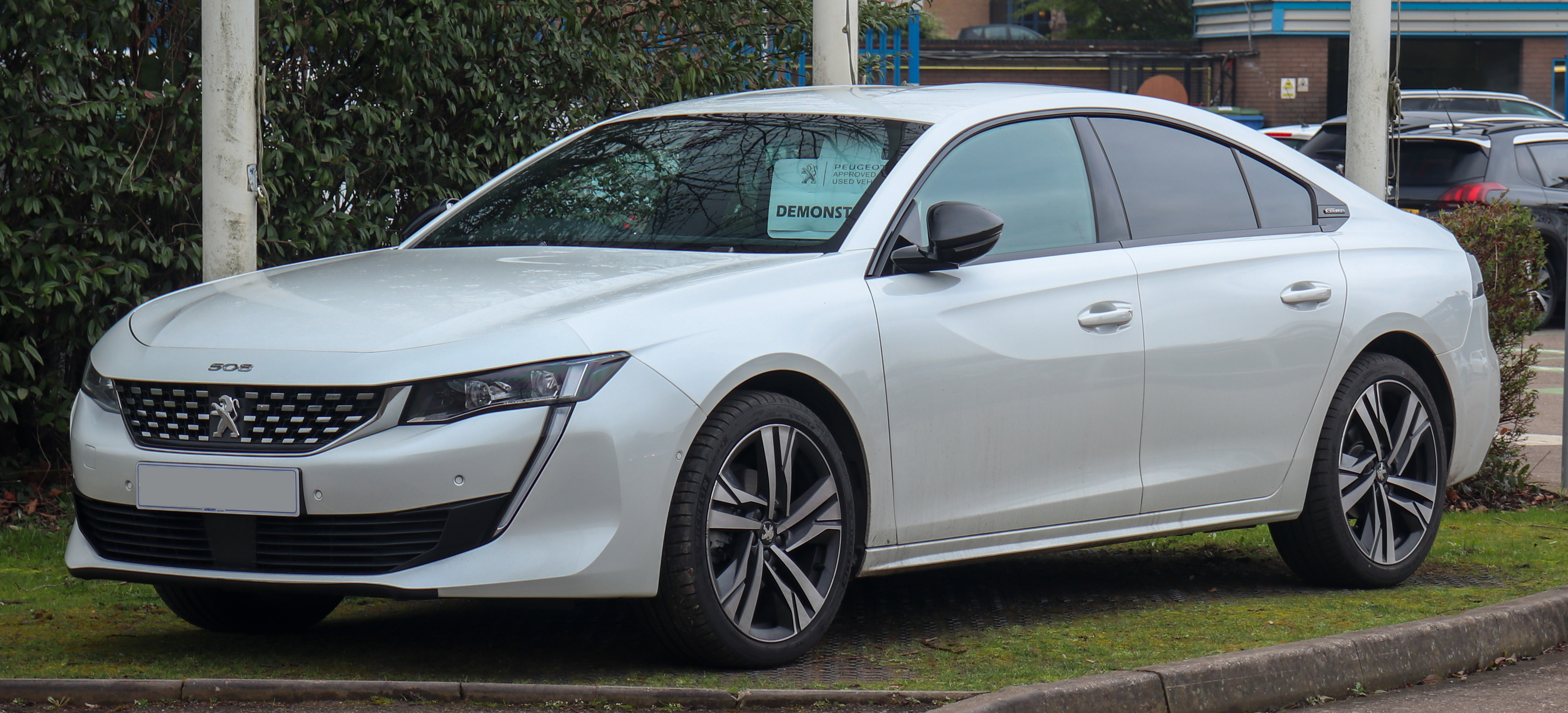
Peugeot 508
2nd generation (2018–2025)

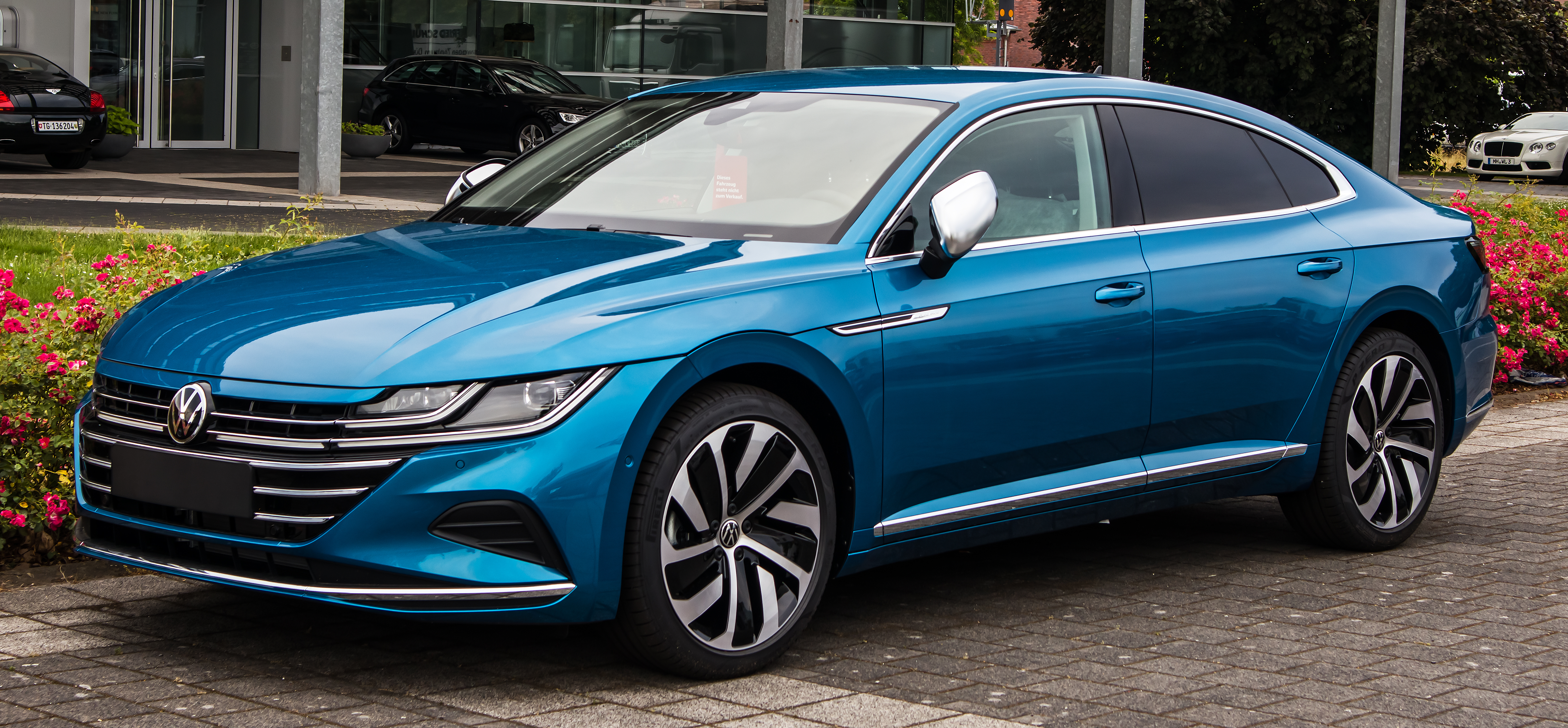
Volkswagen Arteon
1st generation (2017–present)

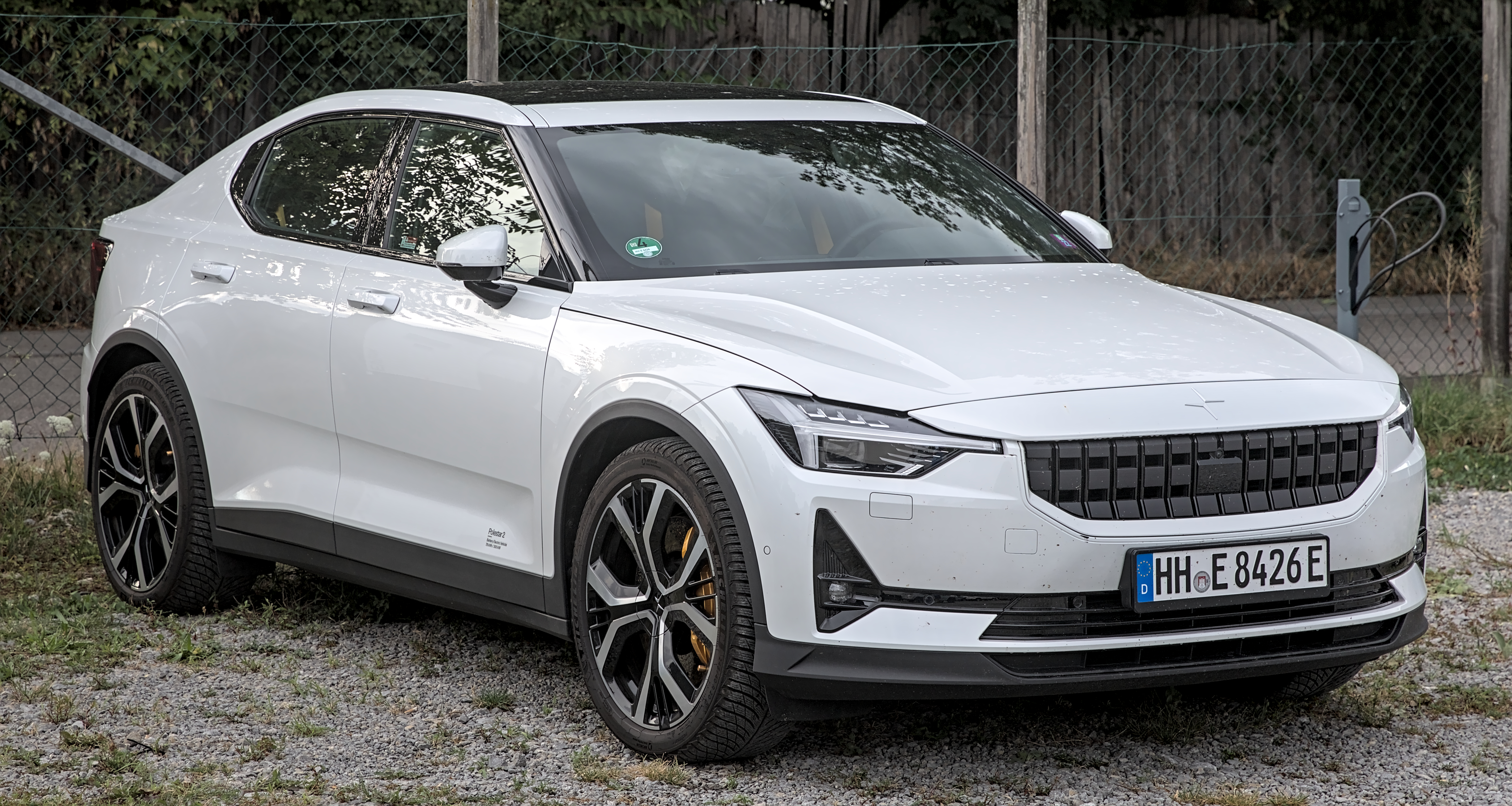
Polestar 2
1st generation (2020–present)

=== List of current cars produced in 2025 ===
- Acura TLX
- Aeolus Yixuan Max
- Aion RT
- Alfa Romeo Giulia
- Avatr 06
- Audi A4/S4/RS4
- Audi A5/S5/RS5
- BMW 3 Series
- BMW 4 Series
- BYD Qin L DM-i/EV
- BYD Seal
- BYD Seal 06 DM-i/EV
- Cadillac CT4
- Changan Raeton Plus
- Citroën C5 X
- Deepal SL03
- Ford Mondeo/Taurus
- Geely Galaxy E8
- Geely Xingrui
- Genesis G70
- Honda Accord
- Hyptec GT
- Hyundai IONIQ 6
- Hyundai Sonata
- Kia K5
- Lexus IS
- Lynk & Co 07
- Mazda EZ-6
- Mercedes-Benz C-Class
- MG7
- Nio ET5
- Peugeot 508
- Polestar 2
- Roewe D7
- Škoda Superb
- Subaru Legacy
- Subaru Levorg
- Tesla Model 3
- Toyota Camry
- Volkswagen Arteon
- Volkswagen Passat
- Volvo V60
- XPeng P7
- Zeekr 007

== Sales figures in Europe ==
2021 rank	Brand	Model	2014	2015	2016	2017	2018	2019	2020	2021	% change (2020–2021)
1	Tesla	Model 3	–	–	–	–	–	95,168	85,979	140,868	▲ +64%
2	BMW	3 Series	168,275	143,023	144,561	129,053	106,991	124,537	118,369	113,209	▼ -4%
3	Volkswagen	Passat	153,677	226,127	206,813	183,288	154,074	124,650	115,363	82,488	▼ -28%
4	Audi	A4/S4/RS4	124,170	124,466	162,655	146,006	112,484	102,994	77,515	59,251	▼ -24%
5	Mercedes-Benz	C-Class	136,474	173,011	176,038	176,915	150,995	143,293	81,909	56,927	▼ -30%
6	Volvo	S60/V60	54,663	54,354	53,268	45,335	46,945	65,917	58,003	47,054	▼ -19%
7	Škoda	Superb	46,149	50,533	85,879	81,410	74,697	67,488	59,925	46,285	▼ -23%
8	BMW	4 Series	53,948	72,769	67,983	64,710	52,248	35,908	18,139	33,083	▲ +82%
9	Audi	A5/S5/RS5	47,591	45,202	43,686	61,619	49,799	41,812	28,525	26,100	▼ -9%
10	Peugeot	508	41,797	43,301	37,104	22,842	13,378	41,329	29,011	25,202	▼ -13%
11	Volkswagen	Arteon	–	–	–	9,798	21,495	19,048	13,582	20,994	▲ +55%
12	Polestar	Polestar 2	–	–	–	–	–	–	8,746	20,949	▲ +140%
13	Opel/Vauxhall	Insignia	92,694	88,544	73,161	72,347	67,424	45,925	21,133	20,384	▼ -4%
14	Ford	Mondeo	45,405	79,673	70,900	56,173	49,596	39,555	21,222	13,481	▼ -36%
15	Toyota	Camry	–	–	–	–	–	7,640	9,119	8,222	▼ -10%
16	Alfa Romeo	Giulia	–	–	10,475	24,679	17,075	10,932	7,436	6,297	▼ -15%
17	Subaru	Legacy/Outback	6,415	10,806	8,242	7,016	7,460	7,504	3,844	6,045	▲ +57%
18	Renault	Talisman	–	1,824	34,344	32,163	19,784	16,405	8,025	5,608	▼ -30%
19	Mazda	Mazda6	31,032	30,519	29,226	23,090	23,090	22,048	6,950	4,890	▼ -30%
20	Jaguar	XE	–	16,535	24,461	18,999	10,877	7,978	3,780	2,039	▼ -46%
21	Kia	Stinger	–	–	–	1,143	3,820	3,600	1,387	1,142	▼ -18%
22	BMW	i4	–	–	–	–	–	–	–	762	New
23	Lexus	IS	9,610	7,729	6,234	5,649	5,413	3,282	1,855	551	▼ -70%
24	Kia	Optima	3,409	3,263	9,515	16,152	14,404	12,202	6,086	430	▼ -93%
25	Subaru	Levorg	–	2,437	4,689	2,865	1,748	1,395	825	417	▼ -49%
26	Lexus	RC	30	526	1,815	1,390	1,334	1,082	710	96	▼ -86%
27	Genesis	G70	–	–	–	–	–	–	–	96	New
28	Citroën	C5 X	–	–	–	–	–	–	–	63	New
29	Xpeng	P5	–	–	–	–	–	–	–	8	New
Mainstream			527,783	619,474	625,185	542,947	450,035	–	–	–	
Premium			613,234	662,738	709,754	694,030	584,091	–	–	–	
Segment total			–	–	–	–	–	1,046,829	787,815	742,941	▼ -6%
Source											

Notes:

Jump in segment total sales after 2019. year is because premium cars are included.

From 2014 to 2018 premium cars are not included in total segment sales.

Premium brands and models are marked italic.

Electric cars are included in D-segment from 2019. year.

== Market share in Europe ==
2019 - After years of decline, the midsized car segment is up 1% in 2019 to 1.05 million sales, maintaining a 6.7% share of the overall car market.

2020 - The midsized car segment is down 25% in 2020 to just under 790,000 sales, as its share of the European car market drops to 6.6%. Luxury brands have started to be dominant in the class, increasing their share to 62.3% from 60.5% last year and claiming four of the top-5 positions. The top-3 players all gain share, outperforming the class as well as the overall market.

== Historic models ==
Note: this list includes cars from these decades which carried a different nameplate or numeric designation to the modern day equivalent, and in some cases there is no modern day direct equivalent

=== 1910s-1920s ===
- (1913) Peugeot Type 153
- (1923) Austro-Daimler ADM
- (1923) Renault KZ
- (1924) Panhard & Levassor Type X45
- (1925) Hillman 14
- (1925) Peugeot Type 176
- (1926) Fiat 507
- (1927) Opel 7/34 / 8/40 PS
- (1927) Fiat 520
- (1927) Volvo ÖV 4
- (1927) Praga Alfa 8/25 HP
- (1928) Citroën C4
- (1929) Volvo PV650 Series

=== 1930s ===
- (1931) Hillman Wizard
- (1931) Renault Primaquatre
- (1931) Renault Vivaquatre
- (1931) Opel 1.8 Liter
- (1931) Lancia Artena
- (1932) Citroën Rosalie (Some trim levels)
- (1933) Auto Union Wanderer W21
- (1933) Hanomag Rekord
- (1934) Praga Super Piccolo
- (1934) Peugeot 401
- (1935) Peugeot 402
- (1935) Fiat 1500
- (1936) Škoda Favorit
- (1937) Lancia Aprilia
- (1938) Vauxhall 14-6

=== 1940s ===
- (1944) Volvo PV444/544
- (1946) Standard Vanguard
- (1948) Peugeot 203
- (1949) Borgward Hansa 1500

=== 1950s ===
- (1950) Fiat 1400
- (1952) Ford Taunus P1
- (1954) Alfa Romeo Giuletta Berlina
- (1955) Peugeot 403
- (1956) Volvo Amazon
- (1959) Panhard PL 17

=== 1960s ===
- (1960) Peugeot 404
- (1961) Fiat 1300
- (1962) Ford Cortina
- (1962) Alfa Romeo Giulia
- (1963) Lancia Fulvia
- (1963) Simca 1300/1500
- (1963) Glas 1700
- (1964) Austin/Morris 1800
- (1964) Ford Mustang
- (1965) Audi 60
- (1965) Renault 16
- (1966) BMW 02 Series
- (1966) Chevrolet Camaro
- (1966) Hillman Hunter
- (1967) Fiat 125
- (1968) Peugeot 504
- (1969) Renault 12

=== 1970s ===
- (1970) Opel Ascona (A)
- (1970) Volkswagen K70
- (1972) Alfa Romeo Alfetta
- (1972) Audi 80
- (1972) Fiat 132
- (1972) Lancia Beta
- (1972) Toyota Carina
- (1973) Volkswagen Passat
- (1974) Volvo 200 Series
- (1975) BMW 3 Series (E21)
- (1975) Leyland Princess
- (1975) Opel Ascona (B) / Vauxhall Cavalier
- (1976) Honda Accord
- (1978) Audi 80
- (1978) Peugeot 305
- (1978) Renault 18
- (1978) Saab 900

=== 1980s ===
- (1980) Morris Ital
- (1981) Volkswagen Passat (B2)
- (1981) Fiat Argenta
- (1981) Opel Ascona C
- (1982) BMW 3 Series (E30)
- (1982) Citroën BX
- (1982) Ford Sierra
- (1982) Mercedes-Benz 190E
- (1982) Nissan Stanza
- (1984) Austin Montego
- (1984) Hyundai Stellar
- (1985) Alfa Romeo 75
- (1985) Fiat Croma
- (1986) Renault 21
- (1987) Peugeot 405
- (1987) Mazda 626
- (1988) Audi 80 B3
- (1988) Opel Vectra/Vauxhall Cavalier
- (1988) Volkswagen Passat B3
- (1989) Subaru Legacy
- (1989) Hyundai Sonata

=== 1990s ===
- (1990) BMW 3 Series (E36)
- (1990) Nissan Primera
- (1991) Audi 80 B4
- (1991) Volvo 850
- (1992) Alfa Romeo 155
- (1992) Ford Mondeo
- (1992) Mitsubishi Galant
- (1992) Mazda Xedos 6
- (1992) Toyota Carina Ε
- (1993) Citroën Xantia
- (1993) Renault Laguna
- (1993) Rover 600 Series
- (1993) Volkswagen_Passat_(B4)
- (1994) Mercedes-Benz C-Class (W202)
- (1994) Saab 900
- (1995) Opel/Vauxhall Vectra
- (1995) Peugeot 406
- (1996) Audi A4 B5
- (1997) Alfa Romeo 156
- (1997) Volkswagen Passat (B5)
- (1997) Volvo S70
- (1998) BMW 3 Series (E46)
- (1998) Saab 9-3
- (1998) Toyota Avensis
- (1998) Ford Cougar
- (1999) Kia Clarus
- (1999) Lancia Lybra
- (1999) Lexus IS

=== 2000s ===
- (2000) Ford Mondeo
- (2000) Volvo S60
- (2001) Audi A4 B6
- (2001) Citroën C5
- (2001) Mercedes-Benz C-Class (W203)
- (2001) Nissan Primera (P12)
- (2001) Renault Laguna II
- (2001) Škoda Superb
- (2002) Jaguar X-Type
- (2002) Opel/Vauxhall Vectra
- (2003) Acura TSX
- (2003) Infiniti G25/35
- (2003) Saab 9-3
- (2004) Acura TL
- (2004) Peugeot 407
- (2005) Alfa Romeo 159
- (2005) BMW 3 Series (E90)
- (2005) Fiat Croma
- (2005) Hyundai Sonata
- (2005) Kia Optima
- (2005) Renault Samsung SM5 II
- (2006) Audi A4 B7
- (2006) Cadillac BLS
- (2006) Lexus IS (XE20)
- (2006) Lincoln Zephyr/MKZ
- (2006) Volkswagen Passat (B6)
- (2007) Renault Laguna III
- (2008) Acura TSX
- (2008) Audi A5 8T/8F
- (2008) Citroën C5
- (2008) Ford Mondeo
- (2008) Infiniti G37
- (2008) Mercedes-Benz C-Class (W204)
- (2008) Škoda Superb II
- (2008) Volkswagen CC
- (2009) Audi A4 B8
- (2009) Acura TL
- (2009) Lexus HS
- (2009) Opel/Vauxhall Insignia/Buick Regal
- (2009) Renault Samsung SM5 III
- (2009) Seat Exeo

=== 2010s ===
- (2010) Peugeot 508
- (2011) DS 5
- (2011) Hyundai i40
- (2011) Volkswagen Passat (B7)
- (2011) Volvo S60
- (2012) BMW 3 Series (F30)
- (2012) Volkswagen Jetta (A6)
- (2013) BMW 4 Series (F32)
- (2013) Cadillac ATS
- (2014) DS 5LS
- (2014) Ford Mondeo/Fusion
- (2014) Infiniti Q50
- (2014) Lexus IS (XE30)
- (2014) Lincoln MKZ
- (2015) Acura TLX
- (2015) Mercedes-Benz C-Class (W205)
- (2015) Renault Talisman
- (2015) Volkswagen Passat (B8)
- (2016) Alfa Romeo Giulia (952)
- (2016) Audi A4 B9
- (2016) Audi A5 8W6
- (2016) Jaguar XE
- (2016) Škoda Superb III
- (2017) Opel/Vauxhall Insignia/Buick Regal
- (2018) Genesis G70
- (2018) Kia Stinger
- (2018) Volkswagen Arteon
- (2019) BMW 3 Series (G20)
- (2019) BMW 4 Series (G22)
- (2019) Volvo S60

=== 2020s ===
- (2020) Cadillac CT4
- (2021) DS 9
- (2022) Mercedes-Benz C-Class (W206)
- (2022) Citroën C5 X

== See also ==
- C-segment
- E-segment
- Euro Car Segment
- Car classifications
- Mid-size car
