= Renault Vivaquatre =

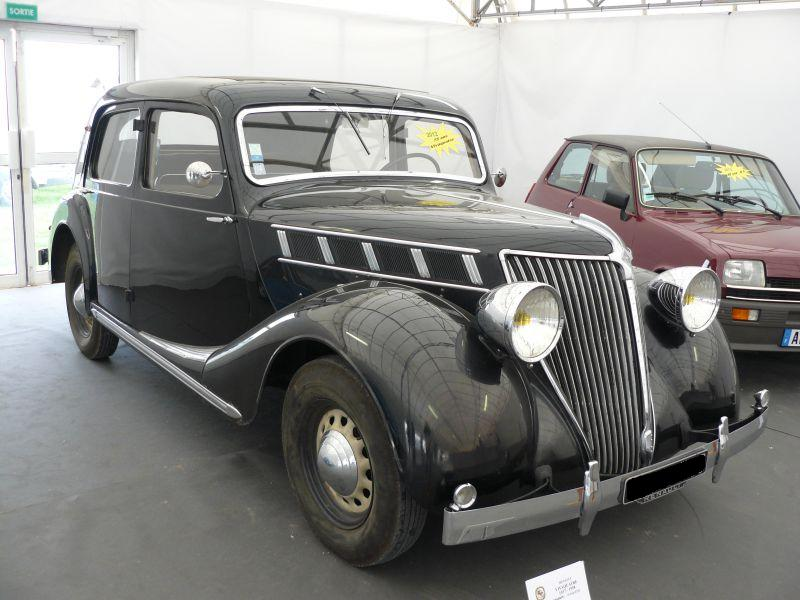

Overview
- Manufacturer: Renault
- Production: 1932–1939
- Assembly: France: Île Seguin, Boulogne-Billancourt, Paris
- Designer: Louis Renault

Body and chassis
- Class: Midsize car (D)
- Layout: FR layout

Powertrain
- Engine: 2120 cc I4; 2383 cc I4
- Transmission: 3-speed manual

Dimensions
- Wheelbase: 2,890 mm (113.8 in) ("KZ13/KZ17", "normal"); 3,130 mm (123.2 in) ("KZ13/KZ17" "long")
- Length: 4,250 mm (167.3 in) ("normal"); 4,490 mm (176.8 in) ("long")

Chronology
- Predecessor: Renault 10CV
- Successor: Renault Frégate

The Renault Vivaquatre is a car produced by Renault between 1932 and 1939. Its large 4-cylinder engine placed it initially in the 10CV car tax class, though a larger engine later made it a contender in the 11CV class.

The "G7" long-wheelbase version of the car was offered for taxi work from April 1933, and Vivaquatre taxis continued to operate till the end of the 1950s.

== Origins ==
The Vivaquatre originated as an offshoot of the development of the Renault Primaquatre which had come to the market a year earlier. The two cars shared a broadly similar chassis design, although the Vivaquatre featured, even in its "normal" configuration, a wheelbase lengthened by 26 cm (10.2 in). Factory assigned project codes also hint at the shared origins of the two models. The original Vivaquatre was identified as project "KZ7" while the original Primaquatre was coded "KZ6". The predecessor model was in both cases known at the time as the Renault 10CV, but is identified in retrospect by the more distinctive project code as the "KZ".

== Description ==
=== Body ===
The Vivaquatre replaced the Renault 10CV which had been as a robust unpretentious car. The Vivaquatre followed the same pattern, closely resembling the earlier car in terms of its principal mechanical elements. The manufacturer offered various "berline" (sedan/saloon) bodies but there was nothing so frivolous as a cabriolet or coupé bodied version. There was, however, a choice of two wheelbase lengths, the longer of which supported a "six-light" body (with three windows on each side) and underpinned the Vivaquatre's long running popularity with the trade of the taxi version.

The Vivaquatre was, in its time, the largest of Renault's four-cylinder models. It could easily be distinguished from models further up in the Renault range by its stand alone headlights and uncovered rear wheel at a time when the manufacturer's larger cars had their head-lights integrated into the front wings and the rear wheels partially covered by fashionable so-called "spats". The Vivaquatre's four cylinder engine also allowed for a shorter bonnet than that to be found on the six-cylinder Renaults. The car's no-nonsense image was further enhanced by a choice, at the time of the motor show in October 1935, between just two colours on the "Luxe" version, these being black and dark blue. Buyers of the "Grand Luxe" version found the colour palette extended to four, through the addition of grey and bordeaux. For the interior there was no choice but to go for standard "marron" (chestnut) coloured fabric.

=== Engine and runnings gear ===
The 4-cylinder side-valve 2120cc fitted on the original Vivaquatre provided a claimed maximum output of 35 hp. The listed power output increased, but the engine size remained constant through the subsequent "KZ17" (1934) and "KZ23" (1935) versions of the car. Power was delivered to the rear wheels, and the three speed transmission came without synchromesh.

=== Evolution ===
The car's evolution followed the Renault tradition of a long series of incremental changes, and there were also frequent body changes, as the car's style became progressively more modern and "aerodynamic". The situation is complicated, in retrospect, by the tendency of the Renault catalogues to offer for sale more than one generation of the model at a time. From April 1932 the manufacturer added the option of paying (in 1932) an extra 4,000 francs of an "SA" version of the engine. "SA" stood for "Suspendu Amorti" which was intended to highlight changes to the engine mountings designed to reduce the effects of engine vibration. This presumably was in response to the "Moteur flottant" ("floating engine") introduced at the same time by Citroën.

==== 1933 (1934 model year) ====
At the 27th Paris Motor Show in October 1933 Renault were displaying the "KZ13" version of the Vivaquatre. Both the "normal" and "long" bodied cars retained the conventional square-backed style of the early 1930s, but the corners were a little more rounded and, most obviously, the previously vertical front grille was now raked at an angle. (The same fashion driven change was being applied to the Citroën Rosalie at this time.) Renault were advertising six different standard body options, all of which were types of "berline" (sedan/saloon). Two featured two side windows on each side and four were "six-light" designs, with three windows on each side of the body. The six body types (with October 1933 listed prices) were:

- "Berline Luxe: 5 places" 23,900 francs,
- "Berline Grand Luxe: 5 places" 25,400 francs,
- "Conduite Intérieure Luxe: 7 places" 29,600 francs,
- "Conduite Intérieure Grand Luxe: 7 places" 28,400 francs,
- "Taxi: 7 places & sliding roof" 30,000 francs,
- "Berline commerciale 880 kg" 21,000 francs.

A more slippery shape would join the line-up in Spring 1934 with the addition of the "Conduite Intérieure Aérodynamique: 5 places" 23,100 francs, the price of which suggested that it was intended for production in relatively large volumes.

A new sequence of project codes was marked by the arrival of the Vivaquatre "ADL1" in 1936. Although the car still used a large 4-cylinder engine, the engine size was increased to 2383cc and claimed maximum power was now 56 HP achieved at 3,300 rpm.

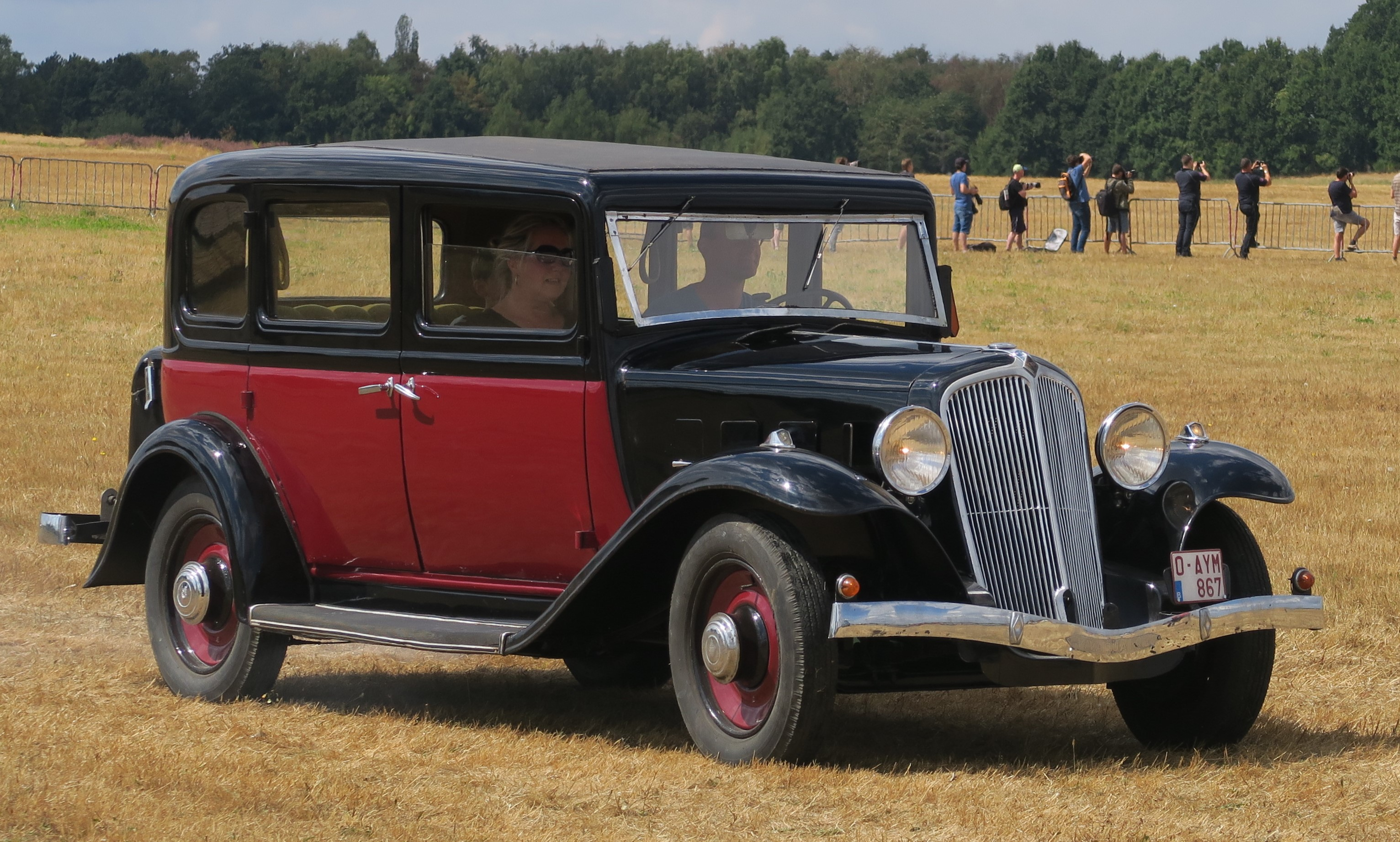
1933 Renault Vivaquatre KZ13

==== 1936 (1937 model year) ====
By the time of the 30th Paris Motor Show in October 1936 the Vivaquatre used what appeared to be the same "aérodynamique" body shell as the manufacturer's 6-cylinder models, but from the side it was clear that the nose and therefore the overall length of the car was nevertheless still significantly shorter, reflecting the lesser length of its four cylinder side-valve engine (by now grown to 2,383cc). The Vivaquatre was a large car by the standards of the time and place, but its power unit and "familiale"/"utilitaire" character placed it at the bottom end of Renault's extensive range of large cars. While the publicity from his principal rival, Andre Citroen, made much of the "tout-acier" ("all-steel") body structure of his modern mass-produced cars, Louis Renault's relationship with Ambi Budd was characterized by a long standing litigation involving alleged patent infringement, and Renault publicity avoided mention of the structural principals used to construct Renault car bodies, but the increasingly curvaceous shapes of the car bodies and the maximisation of shared body panels across several different sizes of car model indicate that Renault car bodies by now had little in common with the heavier labour-intensive timber frame car bodies that had still been mainstream five years earlier. For the 1937 model year the Vivaquatre "ADL2" received the new "wrap-around trapedoidal" front grille shared with other Renaults and the headlights integrated into the front wings now had wind-cheating covers. Plain disc wheels were replaced by disc wheels each with 12 holes placed in a ring pattern between the hub and the outer rim of the wheel. The sloping rear made it possible to include an extra bulge for a boot//trunk accessible from outside, although the entry-level cars came without any opening at the back apart from the flap that covered the now horizontally stowed spare wheel. Although the bodies were more streamlined, the range of standard bodies listed was not so different. The five body types (with listed prices also little changed, reflecting several deflationary years experienced at this stage of the economic depression) at the 1936 motor show were:

- "Berline Luxe without/with boot/trunk" 23,800 francs/24,600 francs,
- "Berline Grand Luxe without/with boot/trunk" 25,000 francs/25,800 francs,
- "Berline Conduite Intérieure Luxe: 6-light (6 side windows)without/with boot/trunk" 26,300 francs/27,100 francs,
- "Berline Conduite Intérieure Grand Luxe: 6-light (6 side windows)without/with boot/trunk" 27,500 francs/28,300 francs,
- "Berline Commerciale" 24,000 francs
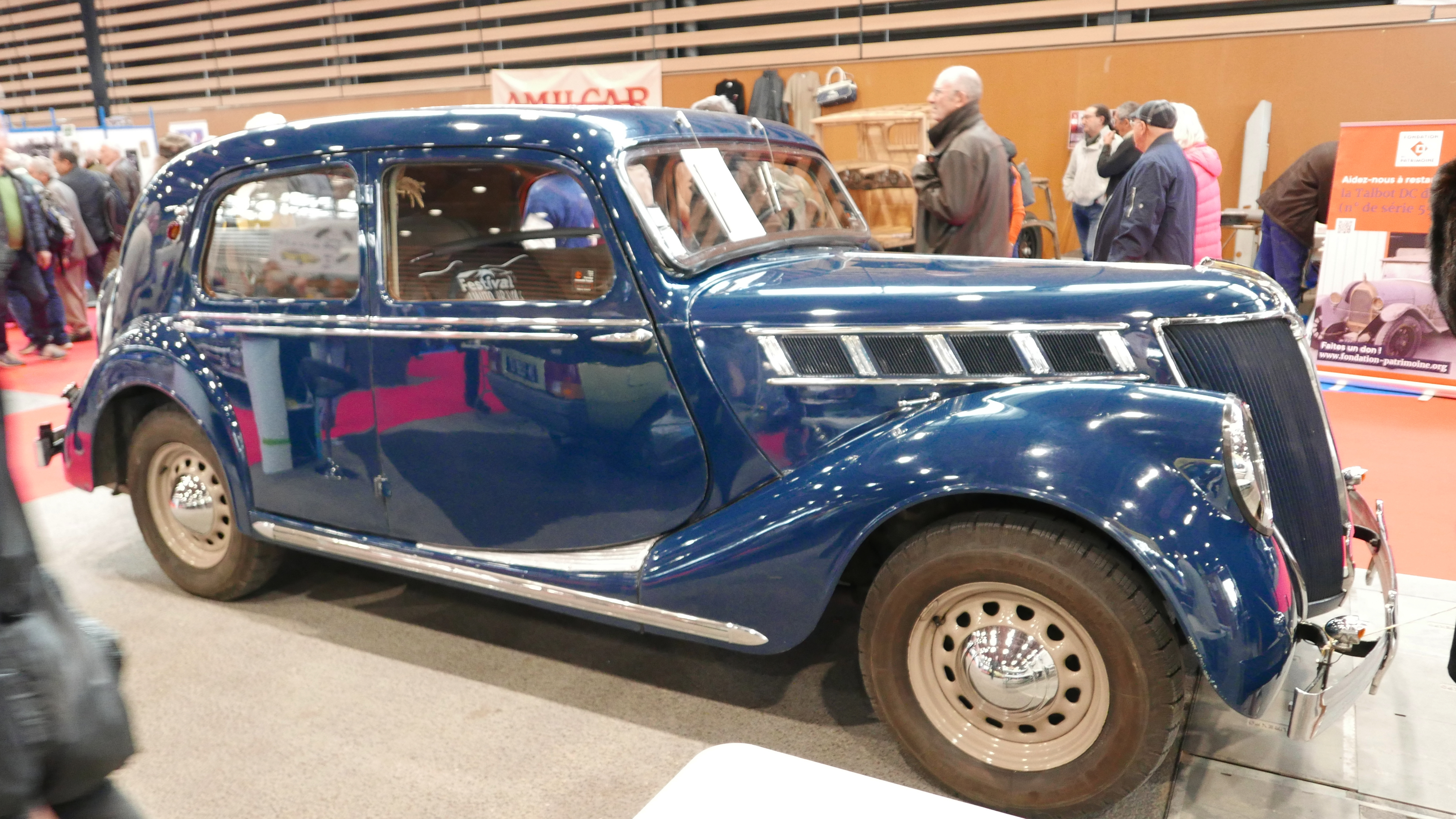
1937 Renault Vivaquatre ADL

==== Final Years ====
During the ensuing years three more versions followed, the "BDH1", "BDH3" and "BDH4". Mechanically, however, the new numbers reflected no further significant changes after 1936. What did change was the all-steel bodies which became progressively more "streamlined" and featured increasingly complex panel shapes. More steeply sloping tails and more intricately styled fronts also correlated with longer overhangs, and by 1939, when the Vivaquatre was pensioned off, the body of the "long" wheelbase version had reached 4,700 mm (185.0 in) in length.

=== No direct replacement ===
There was no direct successor for the Vivaquatre, but in 1950 Renault would return to the sector with their Frégate model.
