= Renault GS =

1919 automobile

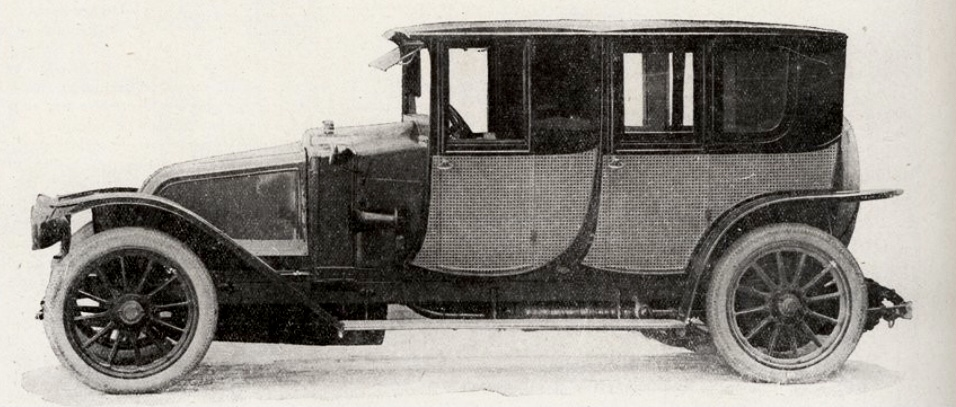

Overview
- Manufacturer: Renault
- Also called: Renault Type GS
- Production: 1919–1920
- Assembly: France Île Seguin, Boulogne-Billancourt, Paris
- Designer: Louis Renault

Body and chassis
- Class: Mid-size / Large family car (D)
- Body style: 4-door Torpedo; 4-door sedan 2-door truck 2-door bus
- Layout: FR
- Related: Renault IG

Powertrain
- Engine: I4 2120cc, 10CV, 15HP
- Transmission: 3-speed manual

Dimensions
- Wheelbase: 2620 mm
- Length: 3470 mm
- Width: 1590 mm
- Height: 1800 mm
- Curb weight: 600 kg

Chronology
- Predecessor: Renault FK
- Successor: Renault IC, Renault IG

The Renault GS was a mid-size car manufactured by Renault from 1919 to 1920. It was also known as the 10CV.

== History ==
The national approval authority granted its approval on 30 October 1919. The predecessor was the Renault FK. The production ended in 1920. The successors were the Renault IC and the Renault IG.

In April 1919, the chassis cost 9,800 francs, and a four-seater torpedo body type cost 12,800 francs.

== Characteristics ==
The Renault GS has a water-cooled four-cylinder engine with a 75 mm bore and 120 mm stroke and a displacement of 2121 cm³. The engine power was transmitted to the rear axle via a driveshaft. The top speed was specified between 39 km/h and 55 km/h, depending on the gearing.

The vehicle has a wheelbase of 262 cm and a track width of 144 cm. It is 347 cm long and 159 cm wide. One source mentions a height of 180 cm but does not specify which body style this refers to. The turning circle was specified as 8 meters. The chassis weighed 600 kg, and the complete vehicle weighed 1250 kg. Available body types included a touring car, sedan, phaeton, pick-up, panel van, and minibus.
