= Lancia Artena =

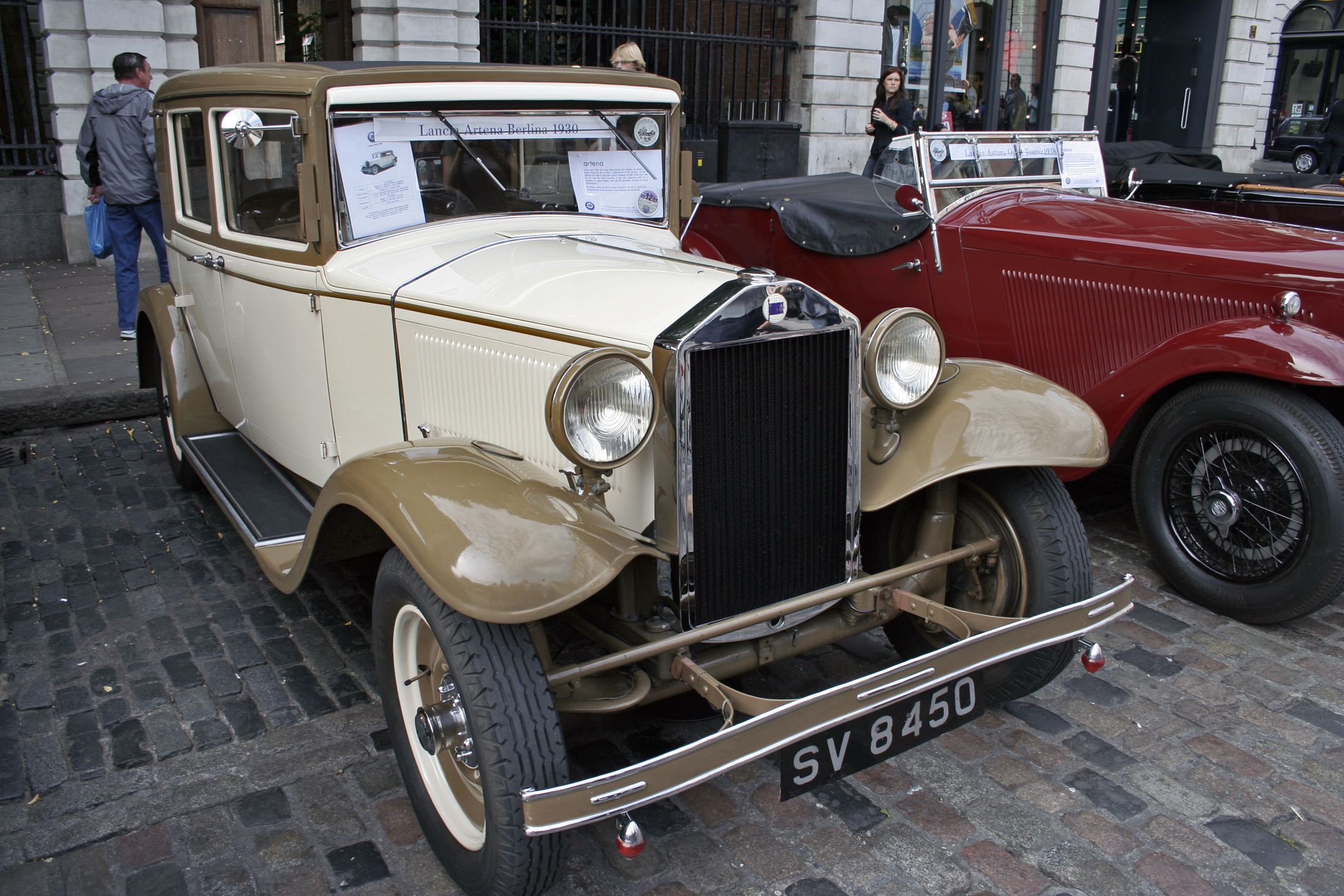
- 1930 Lancia Artena Berlina

Overview
- Manufacturer: Lancia
- Production: 1931–1936; 1940–1942

Body and chassis
- Body style: Bare chassis; 4-door, 4-seater saloon; 4-door, 6-seater saloon
- Layout: Front-engine, rear-wheel-drive
- Related: Lancia Astura

Powertrain
- Engine: 1,924 cc Lancia tipo 84 V4 (petrol)
- Transmission: 4-speed manual

Dimensions
- Wheelbase: Series I–II: 2,990 mm (117.7 in); Series III: 2,950, 3,180 mm (116.1, 125.2 in); Series IV: 3,180 mm (125.2 in)
- Length: Series I–II: 4,320 mm (170.1 in); Series III: 4,370, 4,600 mm (172.0, 181.1 in); Series IV: 4,960, 4,970 mm (195.3, 195.7 in)
- Width: Series I–II: 1,632 mm (64.3 in); Series III: 1,680 mm (66.1 in); Series IV: 1,730, 1,900 mm (68.1, 74.8 in)
- Kerb weight: 1,350 kg (2,976 lb)

Chronology
- Predecessor: Lancia Lambda

The Lancia Artena (Tipo 228) is a passenger car produced by Italian car manufacturer Lancia from 1931 until 1936, and from 1940 until 1942 chiefly for army and government use. It was powered by a 2-litre Lancia V4 engine, while chassis and factory bodies were shared with the more luxurious 2.6-litre V8-engined Lancia Astura. Total production amounted to 5,567 examples.

== History ==
Artena and her sister Astura made their début at the October 1931 Paris Motor Show. Interrupting Lancia's decade-old tradition of naming its cars with Greek letters, the new model was named after Artena, an ancient town of the pre-Roman Volsci people.

The Lancia Astura was a more powerful and more luxurious version of this car based on the same platform. Besides the engines, main differences between the two cars were the Artena's Michelin disc wheels instead of the Astura's Rudge-Whitworth wire wheels, and the Astura's longer wheelbase.

There were four successive versions of the car. The first series was built between autumn of 1931 through summer of 1932; during the next year the second series was produced, and the third series from Autumn 1933 until the start of 1936.

=== Series I ===
Produced between 1931 and 1932, 1,500 built.

Deliveries began in December 1931. The 2-litre engine put out 55 hp (41 kW). For 1932 the Artena was available from the factory in two 4-door body styles—four-window saloon seating four and six-window saloon seating six—or as bare chassis.

=== Series II ===
Produced between 1932 and 1933, 1,520 built.

Second series changes were light; the car now incorporated modified engine mountings to reduce noise and vibrations.

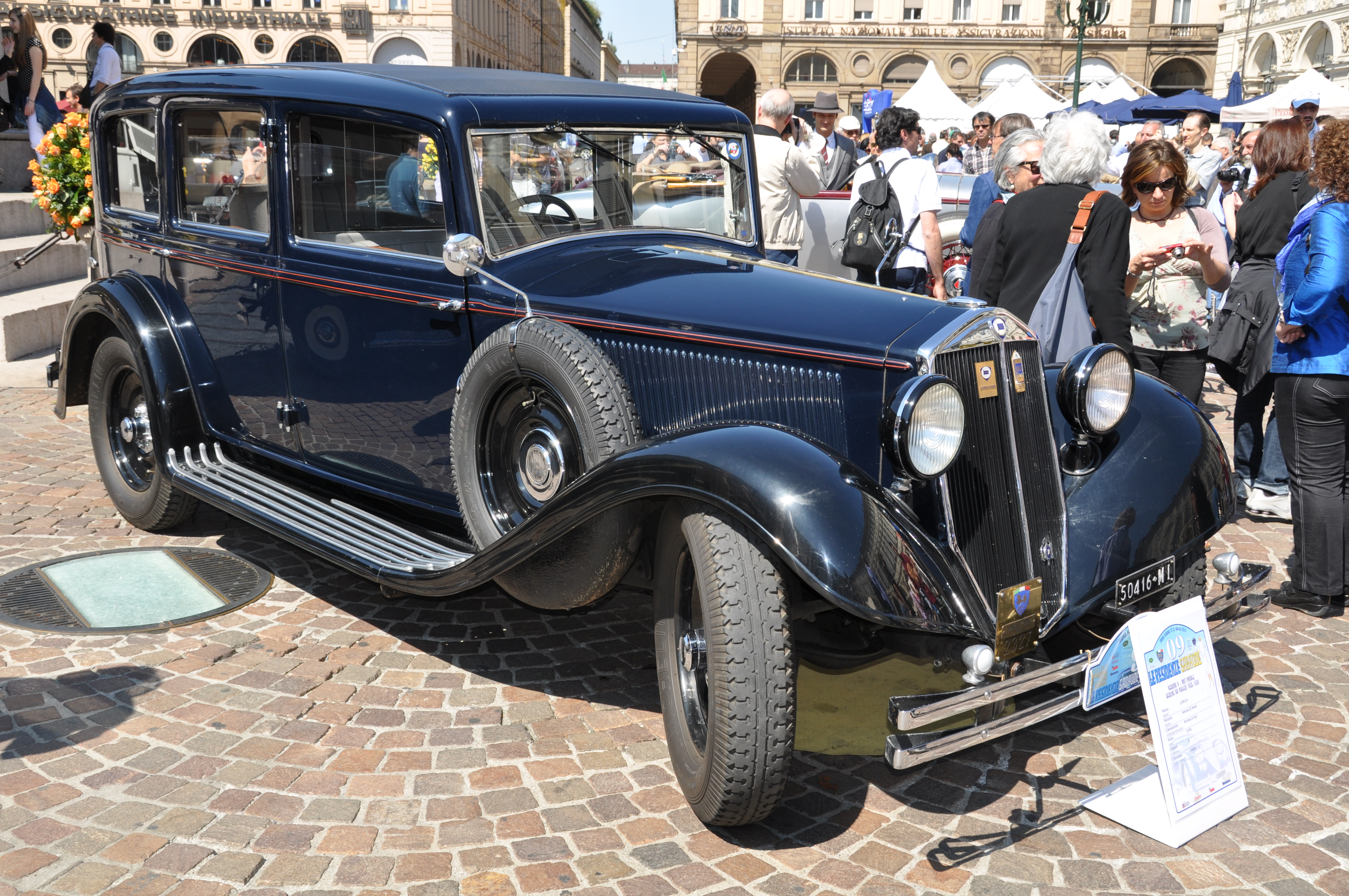
Third series Lancia Artena six-window saloon (228A)

=== Series III ===
Produced between 1933 and 1936, 2,040 built.

The third series brought deeper changes, including new bodywork with a slanted grille. The chassis was modified and made available in two different wheelbase lengths, short (3.0 m, chassis tipo 228C) and normal (3.2 m, chassis tipo 228A)—hitherto a prerogative of the more expensive Astura. The new 1934 range introduced in late 1933 thus included short or normal bare chassis, four passenger saloon on the short chassis, and six passenger saloon on the normal chassis. In total 1,552 Artena 228As and 488 short-wheelbase Artena 228Cs were made.

=== Series IV ===
Produced between 1940 and 1942, 507 built.

At the beginning of World War II, the Artena was put back into production at the request of the Royal Italian Army. As the car was now intended chiefly for use by the army to chauffeur high officers rather than for private sales, it was modified accordingly. The chassis was a new platform frame, bearing new type codes, and was produced in longer wheelbase version only. The engine was also a modified Tipo 54A with a lower output of 51 hp (38 kW) at 3,800 rpm. Another change were Fergat stamped-steel wheels.

Chassis type 341 was designed for passenger cars; top speed was down to 105 km/h (65 mph). 361 of this type were built. Three body styles were made for official usage, all three 6-seaters featuring a roll-down partition between the driver and the passenger compartment:

- Berlina, six-window saloon for government duties and accordingly known as Ministeriale.
- Trasformabile 4 luci, 4-door, four-light convertible saloon (bodied by Carrozzeria Viotti).
- Torpedo trasformabile, saloon with folding roof, for colonial and field use as military staff car, known as Militare (also by Carrozzeria Viotti).

Chassis type 441 was a modified version, to be outfitted as an ambulance. 191 were built.

== Coachbuilders ==
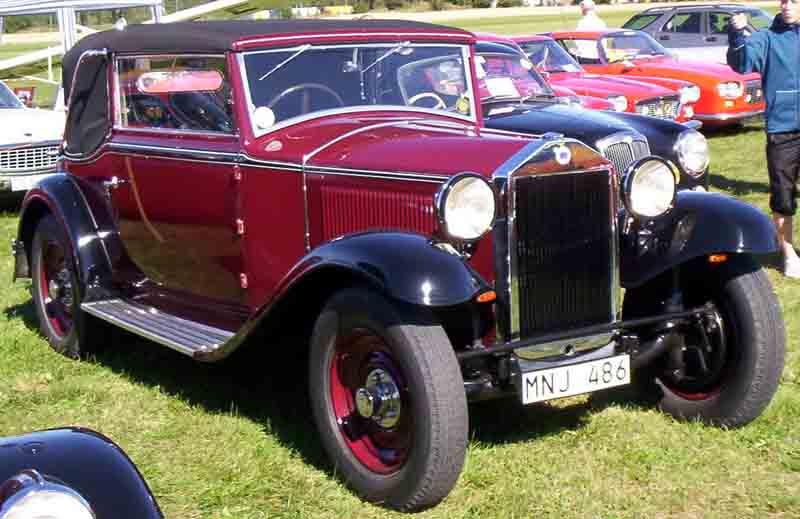
Lancia Artena Cabriolet 1931

Lancia offered the Artena and Astura in saloon form only, and left its other body styles to third-party coachbuilders. Coachbuilders like Stabilimenti Farina, Pinin Farina and Carrozzeria Touring built Artena cabriolets, coupés, faux cabriolets, torpedoes and sport saloons. The Dutch coachbuilder B.T. Van Rijswijk has made in 1938 one dropheadcoupe.

Other coachbuilders offered conversions into commercial vehicles, such as vans or ambulances. Viotti made two special Artena mobile studios for the Italian public service broadcaster, EIAR.

== Specifications ==
Overall the Artena reprised the layout set by the preceding Lancia Lambda, the crucial difference being the body-on-frame construction, in contrast to the Lambda's unibody. This was to provide a suitable basis for coachbuilders to work on, as at the time bespoke coachwork was common on luxury cars such as the Astura; unibody development continued on small Lancias like the Augusta.

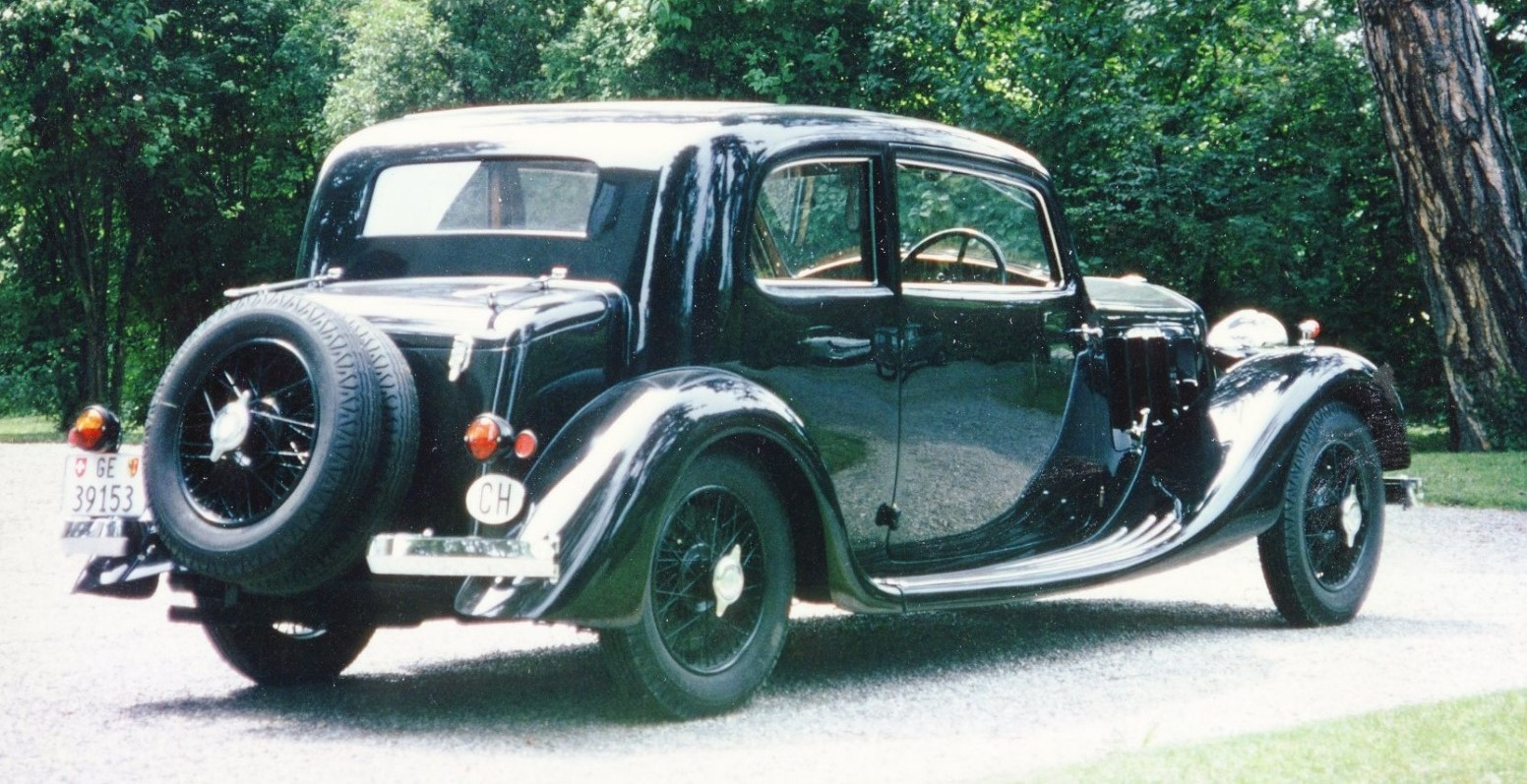
Lancia Artena of 1934

The Artena's engine was a Tipo 84 Lancia V4 engine, with a one-piece cast iron cylinder block. A narrow angle of 17° between the cylinder banks kept the engine compact; all four cylinders' exhausts exited on the left hand side, while on the right there was a single Zenith downdraught carburettor. A chain-driven overhead camshaft operated two parallel poppet valves per cylinder. Bore and stroke measured respectively 82.55 and 90.0 mm (3.3 and 3.5 in), for a total displacement of 1,924 cc (117.4 cu in); maximum power was 55 hp (41 kW) at 4,000 rpm. Lancia declared a top speed of 115 km/h (71 mph). Noteworthily the engine was not directly attached to the chassis, but rather suspended via two leaf springs in order to dampen vibrations.

The transmission was a 4-speed gearbox with a single-plate dry clutch; fourth speed was a direct drive.

Front suspension was independent of the "Lancia" sliding pillar type, developed from the Lambda's. At the rear there was a solid axle on semi-elliptic leaf springs and friction disk dampers. Braking was via drums, on all four corners.

== Bibliography ==
- Frostick, Michael (1976). Lancia. London: Dalton Watson. ISBN 0-901564-22-2.
- Amatori, Franco; et al. (1992). Storia della Lancia — Impresa Tecnologie Mercati 1906–1969. Milan: Fabbri Editori.
