= Lancia Astura =

Overview
- Manufacturer: Lancia
- Production: 1931–1939

Body and chassis
- Layout: FR layout
- Related: Lancia Artena

Powertrain
- Engine: 2606 cc V8; 2973 cc V8
- Transmission: 4-speed manual

Dimensions
- Wheelbase: 318 cm (125.2 in) (S.1-S.2); 310 cm (122.0 in) (S.3); 333 cm (131.1 in) (S.3); 348 cm (137.0 in) (S.4)
- Curb weight: 1,250 kg (2,756 lb)-1,750 kg (3,858 lb)

Chronology
- Predecessor: Lancia Dilambda
- Successor: Lancia Aprilia

The Lancia Astura is a passenger car produced by Italian automobile manufacturer Lancia between 1931 and 1939. Lancia replaced the Lambda model with two models: the four-cylinder Artena and the larger, V8-powered Astura. Both of these models were introduced at the Paris Motor Show in 1931. The Astura chassis was used by various coachbuilders to create coupes, convertibles and sedans.

The Astura evolved over four series:

- First series, built between 1931 and 1932 with 496 units made.
- Second series, built between 1932 and 1933 with 750 units made. The engine mountings were modified for this generation to reduce noise and vibration.
- Third series, built between 1933 and 1937 with 1,243 units made. The third-generation Astura was offered in short-wheelbase and long-wheelbase variants, and was powered by a new, larger engine.
- Fourth series, built between 1937 and 1939 with 423 units made. Only offered in long-wheelbase.

== Engines ==
First- and second-generation Asturas are powered by a 72 hp 2.6-liter 19° V8 engine, while third- and fourth-generation models are powered by a 3.0-liter 17° V8 capable of 82 hp.

Model	Engine	Displacement	Power	Fuel Delivery System
S.1-S.2	V8 SOHC	2606 cc	72 hp (54 kW)	single carburetor
S.3-S.4	V8 SOHC	2973 cc	82 hp (61 kW)	single carburetor

== Awards ==
At the 2016 Pebble Beach Concours d'Elegance, a 1936 Astura Pinin Farina Cabriolet once owned by Eric Clapton won both the Best of Show award and the Gwenn Graham Most Elegant Convertible award. A Lancia Astura Serie IV also won the Trofeo BMW Group Italia, held by public referendum, at the 2019 Concorso d'Eleganza Villa d'Este event.

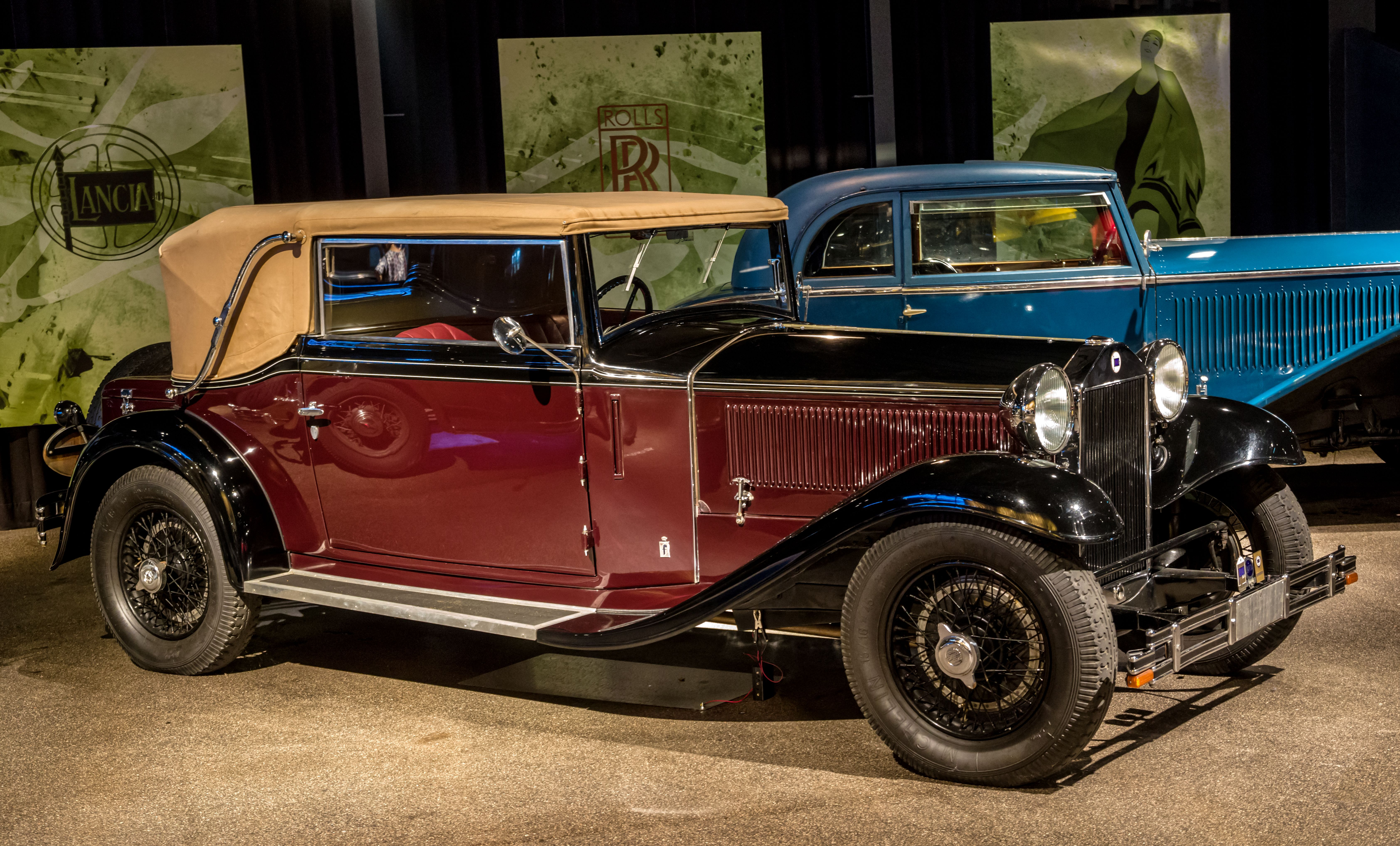
1932 Lancia Astura 1st Series Volante

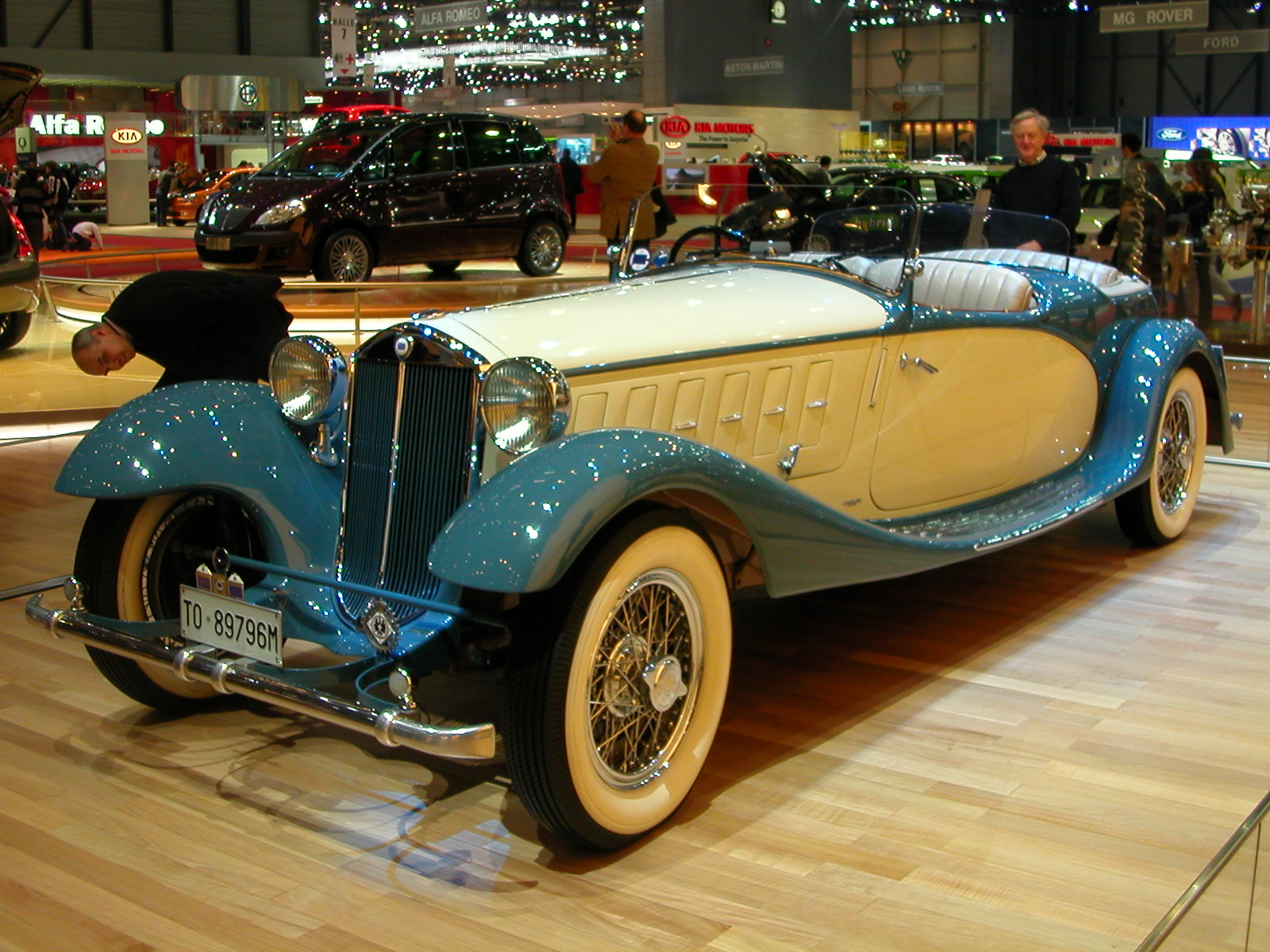
1933 Lancia Astura Phaeton

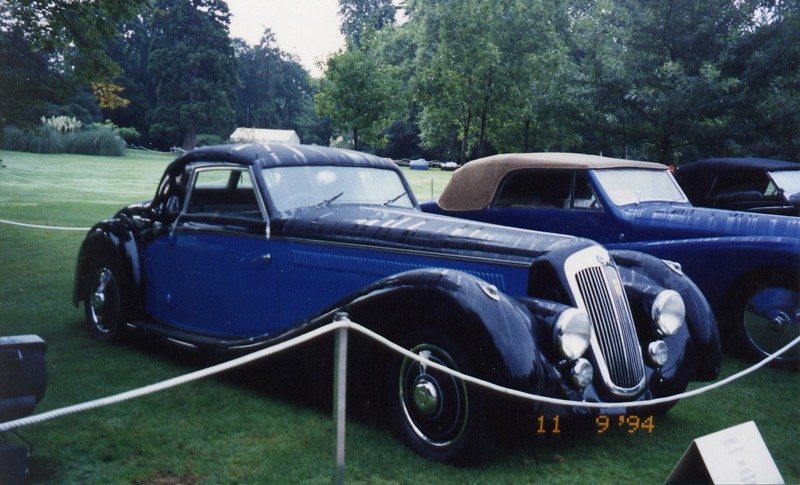
1938 Lancia Astura Sports Coupé Pourtout

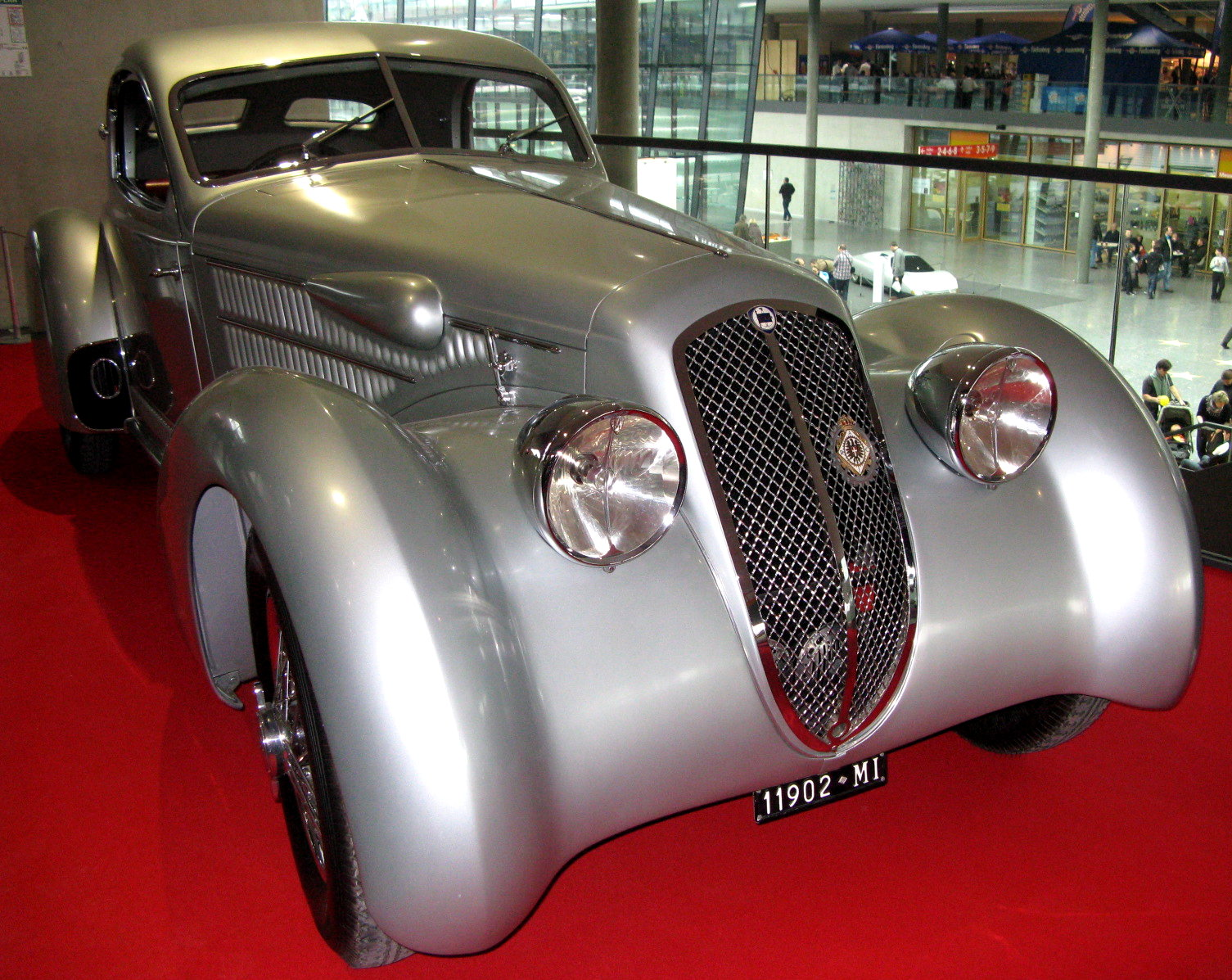
1935 Lancia Astura 233C Aerodynamica

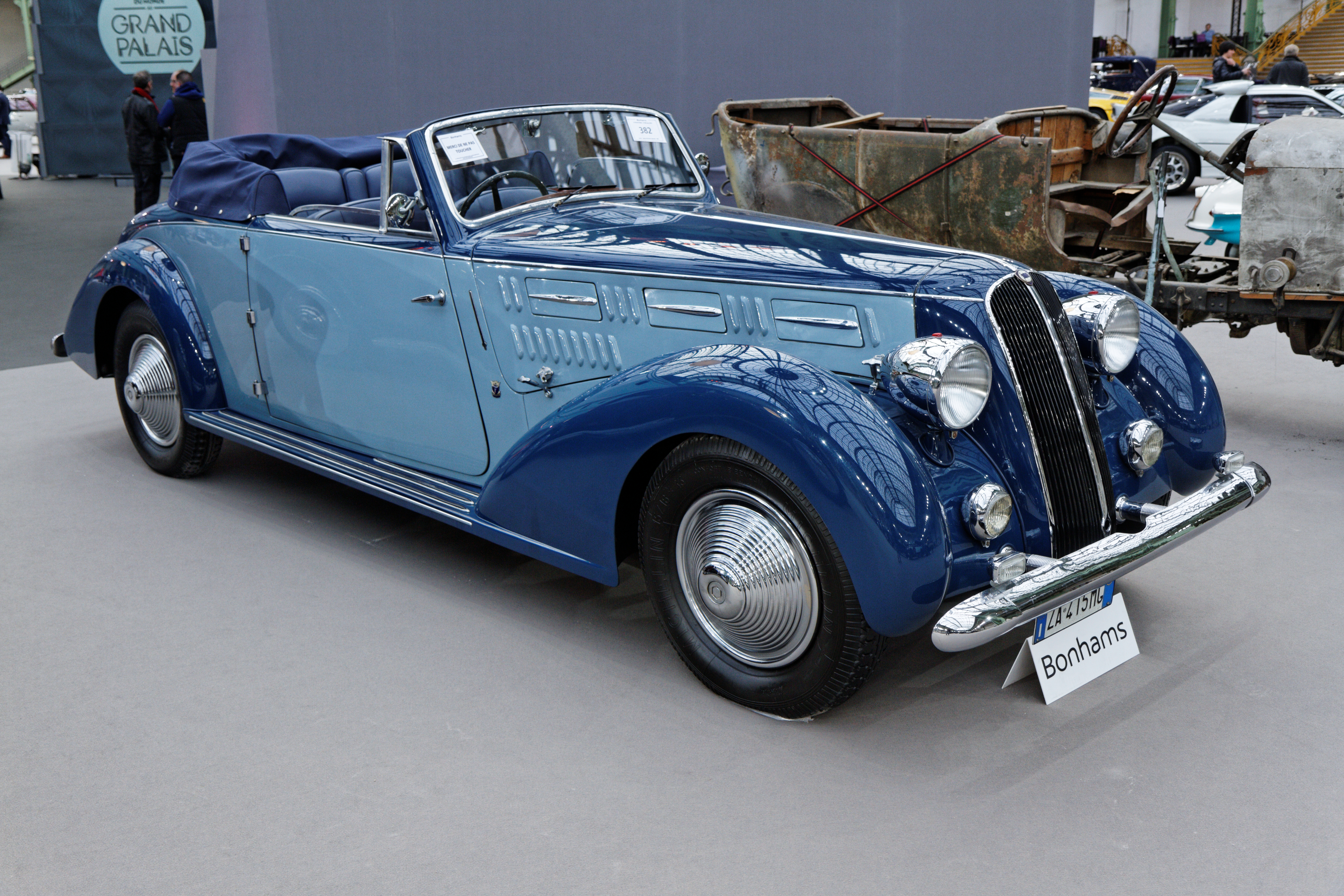
1936 Lancia Astura 3rd Series Cabriolet

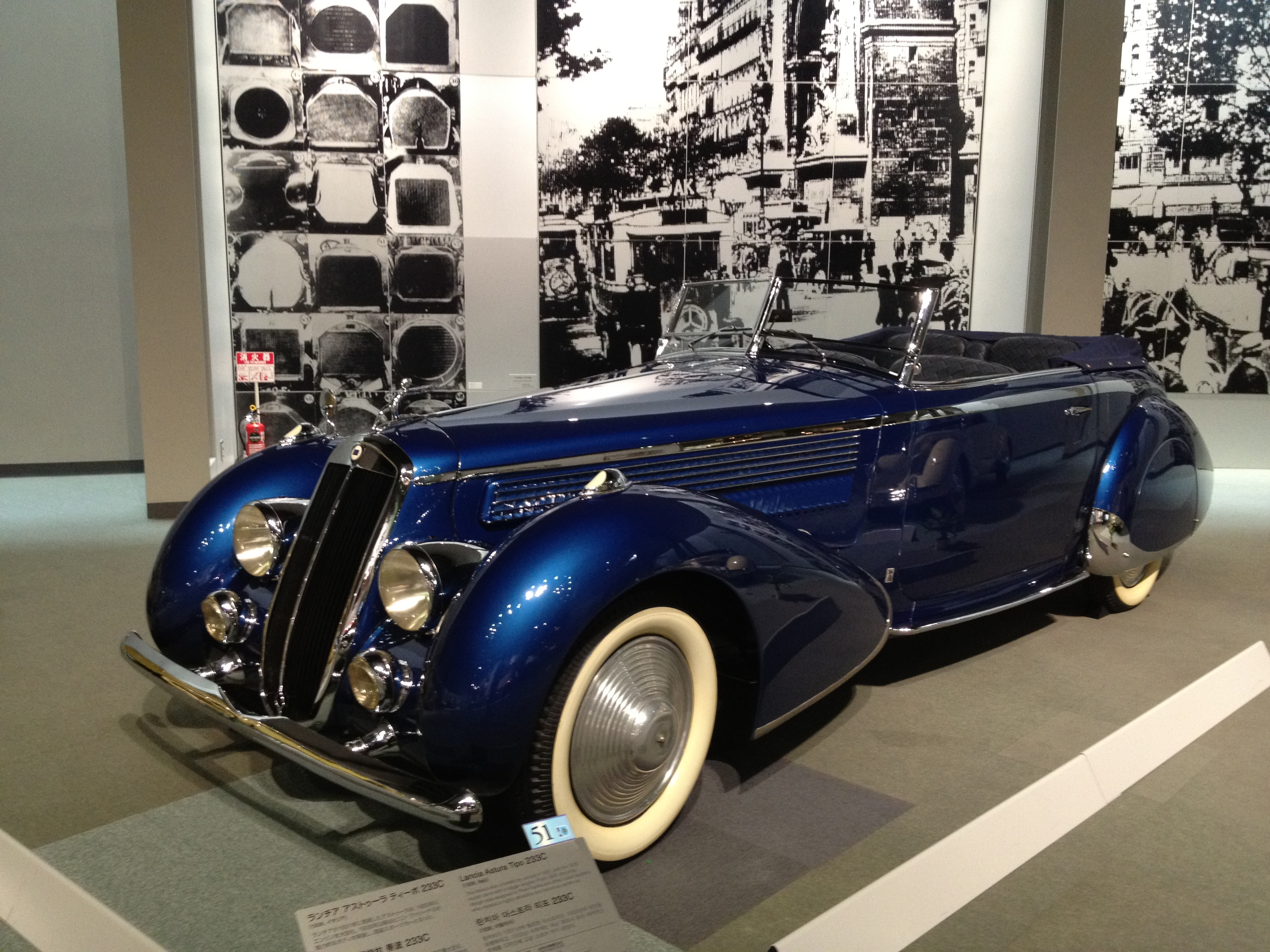
1936 Lancia Astura 3rd Series Tipo 233C

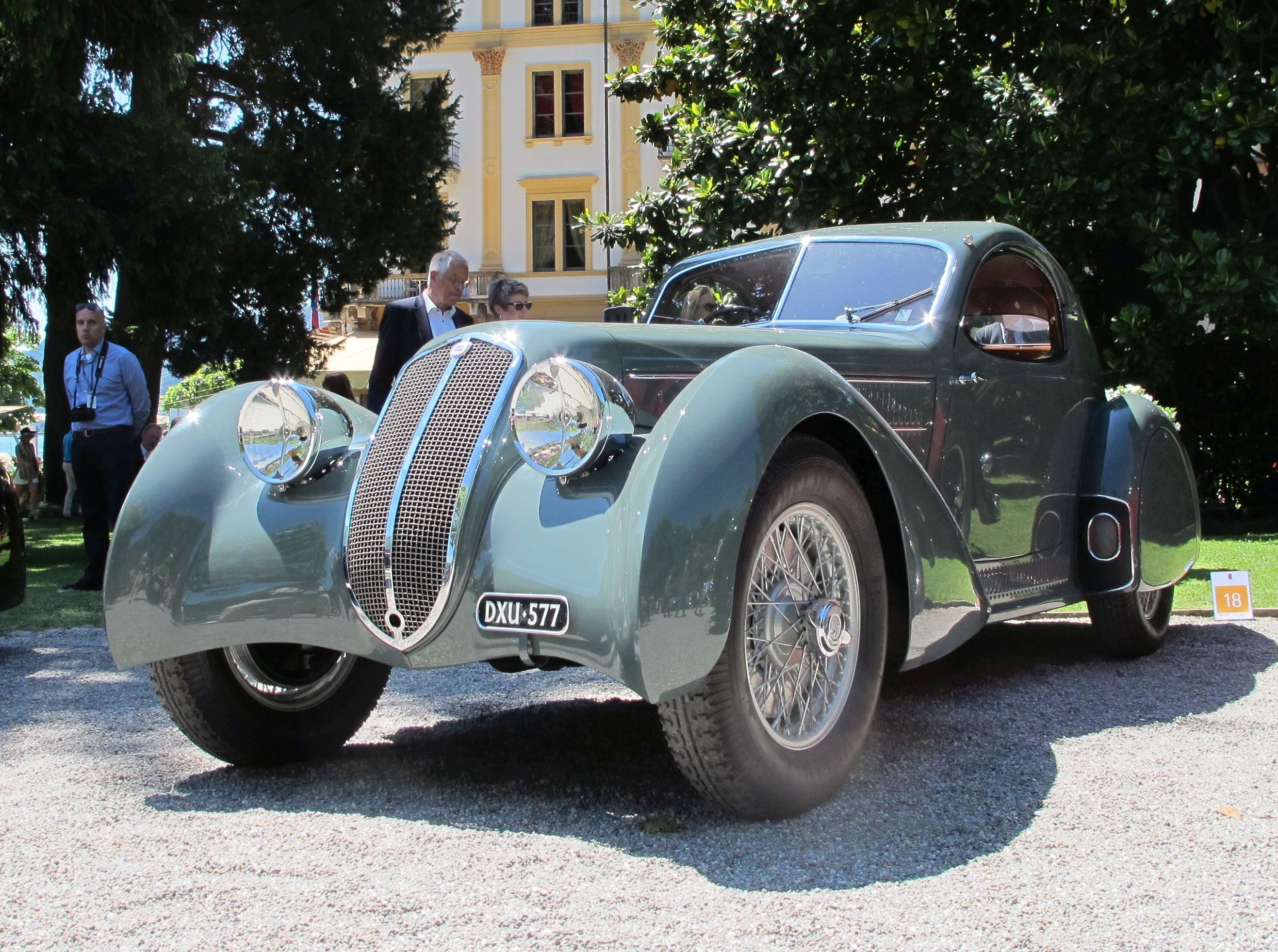
Lancia Astura Series II, Carrozzeria Castagna

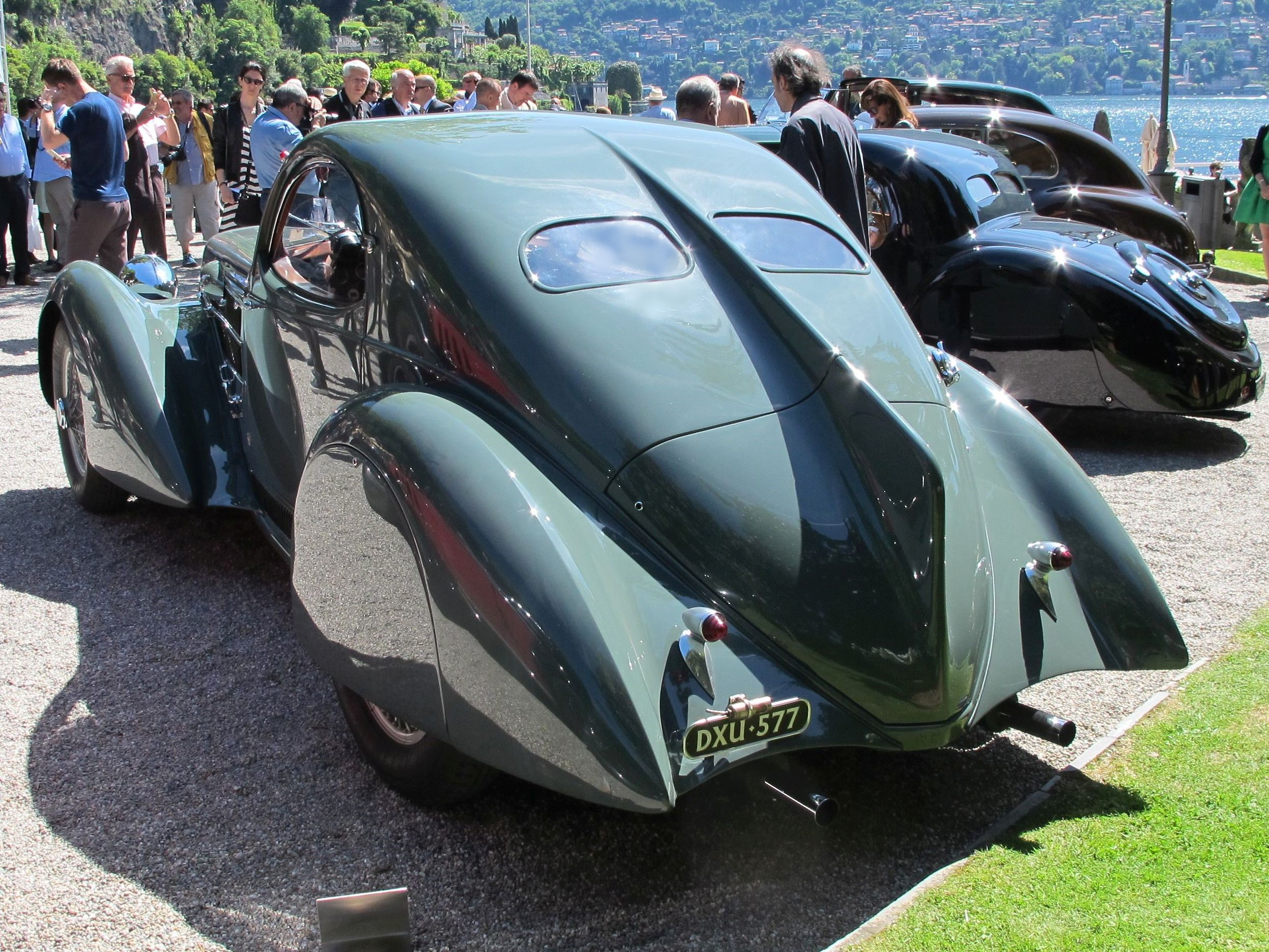
Lancia Astura Series II from Castagna, rear

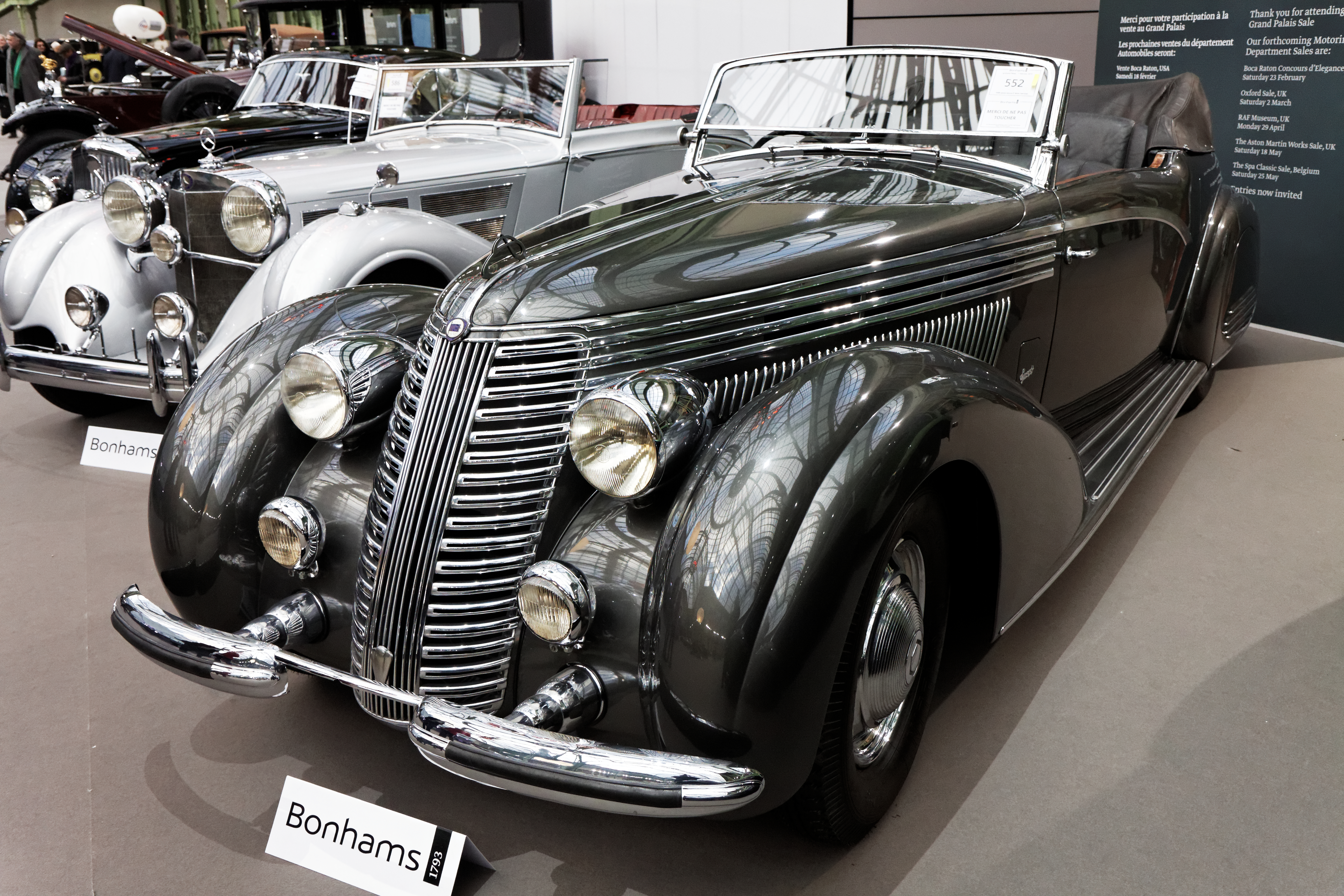
1938 Lancia Astura 4th Series Cabriolet Coachwork by Carrozzeria Boneschi
