= Presidential inauguration =

A presidential inauguration is a ceremonial event centered on the formal transition of a new president into office, usually in democracies where this official has been elected. Frequently, this involves the swearing of an oath of office.

Examples of presidential inaugurations include:

- Brazilian presidential inauguration
- Colombian presidential inauguration
- French presidential inauguration
- Irish presidential inauguration
- Kazakh presidential inauguration
- Nigerian presidential inauguration
- Philippine presidential inauguration
- Polish presidential inauguration
- Russian presidential inauguration
- Ukrainian presidential inauguration
- United States presidential inauguration
