= Inauguration =

Process of official entitlement a person into public office

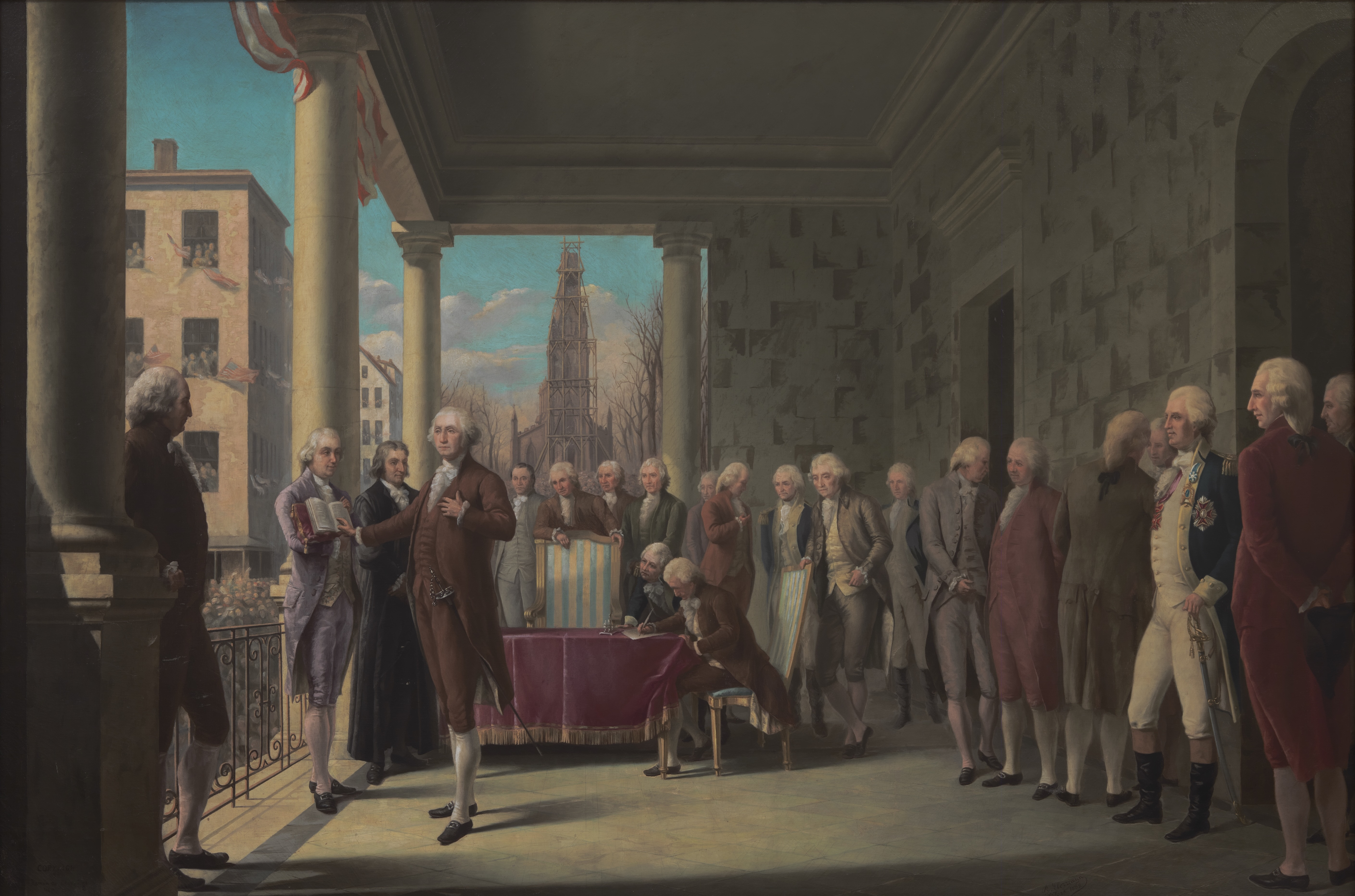
Inauguration of the first U.S. President George Washington

In government and politics, inauguration is the process of swearing a person into office and thus making that person the incumbent. Such an inauguration commonly occurs through a formal ceremony or special event, which may also include an inaugural address by the new official.

The word inauguration stems from the Latin augur, which refers to the rituals of ancient Roman priests seeking to interpret if it was the will of the gods for a public official to be deemed worthy to assume office.

== Public office ==
The inaugurations of public figures, especially those of political leaders, often feature lavish ceremonies in which the figure publicly takes their oath of office (sometimes called "swearing in"), often in front of a large crowd of spectators. A monarchical inauguration may take on different forms depending on the nation: they may undergo a coronation rite or may simply be required to take an oath in the presence of a country's legislature.

The "inaugural address" is a speech given during this ceremony which informs the people of their intentions as a leader. A famous inauguration speech is John F. Kennedy's.

== Presidential inaugurations ==
- Argentinian presidential inauguration
- Brazilian presidential inauguration
- Colombian presidential inauguration
- French presidential inauguration
- Indonesian presidential inauguration
- Iranian presidential inauguration
- Irish presidential inauguration
- Kazakh presidential inauguration
- Nigerian presidential inauguration
- Philippine presidential inauguration
- Polish presidential inauguration
- Russian presidential inauguration
- Ukrainian presidential inauguration
- United States presidential inauguration
- Venezuelan presidential inauguration

== See also ==
- Coronation
- Enthronement
- Installation (Christianity)
- Opening (disambiguation)
