= Official transport in Poland =

The president of Poland, prime minister of Poland, and other high officials are protected by State Protection Service (SOP). Both the president and prime minister are entitled to use an armored car and travel in at least a 3-car motorcade (with 6 to 10 guards).

== History ==
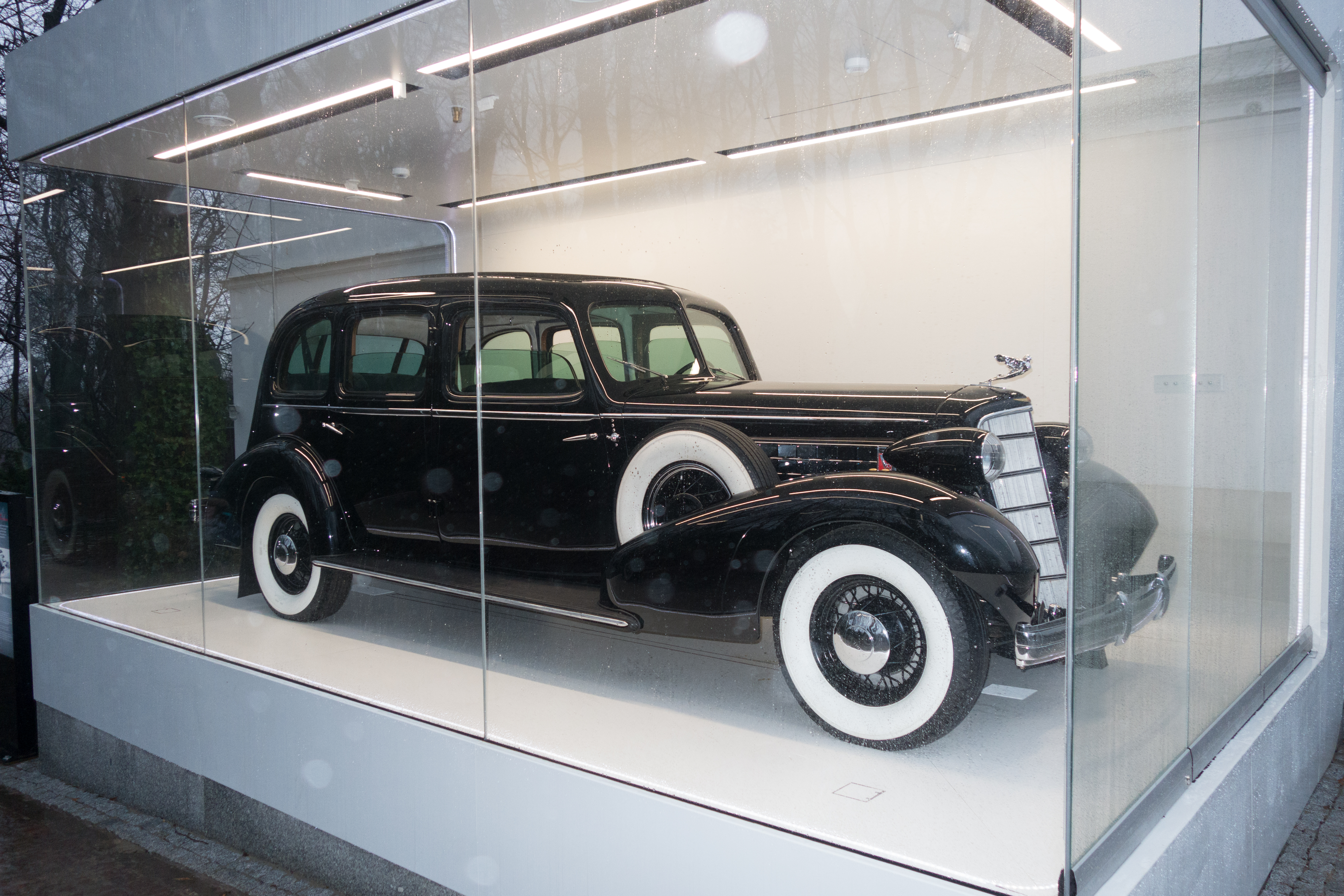
The Cadillac Fleetwood 355D used by Józef Piłsudski as his state car

=== Second Polish Republic (1918-1939) ===
A range of luxury vehicles was used for official state transport in the Second Polish Republic, including models such as the CWS T-1 Torpedo, Packard 443, Cadillac 341B Phaeton, Packard 645 Deluxe Eight, Packard 826, Cadillac 370A, and Cadillac Series 75 Fleetwood V8 Limousine. These vehicles were part of the Zamkowa Kolumna Samochodowa (Castle Motor Column), which operated between 1922 and 1939 and provided transport for the President of the Republic of Poland, civil and military offices, and visiting foreign dignitaries. In 2014 a 1935 Cadillac Fleetwood 355D used by Marshal Józef Piłsudski was restored to a driving condition.

=== Communist Poland (1948-1989) ===
Communist president Bolesław Bierut had a 1939 Austin Twenty-Eight. Józef Cyrankiewicz, the longest-serving prime minister of the Polish People's Republic used cars such as 1953 Buick Skylark, 1961 Jaguar E-Type and 1963 Jaguar Mark X. First Secretary of the PZPR in the 1950s and 1960s Władysław Gomułka used cars such as ZIS-110, GAZ-13 Chaika, ZIL-111D and Mercedes W109 300SEL. They both used also the Mercedes-Benz 300d "Adenauer". 1970s prime minister Piotr Jaroszewicz used W109 300 SEL. In 1978 an armored Cadillac Fleetwood Brougham was purchased for First Secretary Edward Gierek.

Wojciech Jaruzelski as a first secretary, a prime minister, a chairman of the Council of State and a president used different armored Peugeot 604 Ti since 1981, Peugeot 505 in 1985 and several Volvo 760 GLE since 1986.

== Current use ==
After the fall of communism, the republic of Poland president Lech Wałęsa since 1990 used an also stretched Volvo 760 GLE and since 1991 a Mercedes-Benz 560 SEL (W126) by Trasco and an Audi A8 D2 since 1994. 1995-2005 polish president Aleksander Kwaśniewski used both an Audi A8 and Mercedes-Benz 560 SEL until 1997 and since then was primarily associated with a fleet of BMW 750iL S (E38). Lech Kaczyński mostly used original and facelifted BMW 7 Series (E67). Bronisław Komorowski was the first president to use Mercedes-Benz S600 Guard (W221) and BMW 760Li High Security (F03) purchased in 2010.

Ahead of the Polish EU presidency in 2011 a fleet of 14 Audi A8, nine Audi A6s and four Audi Q7s was purchased in late 2010 for BOR. At least two armored Audi A8 L Security (4H) with VR9 protection were delivered in December 2016 for use by President Andrzej Duda. After one of the cars was destroyed in 2017, two more Audi A8 L Security were delivered in December 2017. In 2019, the SOP purchased an armored Range Rover Sentinel VR8 SUV for occasional use by the president or the prime minister. It joined a white Toyota Land Cruiser V8 used for traveling in unsurfaced terrain. In 2021, Duda switched to a Mercedes-Benz S 600 Guard (W222). On the inauguration day - August 6, 2025, Karol Nawrocki debuted as the President inside a BMW 7 Protection (G73) first ordered in 2024.

In the 1990s common cars among Polish officials included the Lancia Thema and Lancia Kappa. Between 1993 and 1995 Prime Minister Waldemar Pawlak replaced his Volvo 760 limousine with a Polish-made FSO Polonez. Since 2010 the most popular car used by government members officials is the Škoda Superb.

== Incidents ==
In 2016 and 2017, there were two serious car accidents involving official cars. In the past decade, the BOR had dozens of car collisions, but those cases were hidden from the public. On 4 March 2016, Andrzej Duda's BMW 760Li HS went into a ditch on the A4 motorway when its rear tire blew. The accident was blamed on a series of procedure violations, while the tire (produced in 2010) was used beyond its two years service life against the manufacturer's accordance. Four days after the incident, the Ministry of Interior settled the tender for 20 new cars, selecting Audi A8L Quattro, but eventually in June 2016 it ordered 20 BMW 750Li xDrive (G12) instead. In 2019 SOP purchased eight Audi A8L Quattro (D5).

On 25 January 2017, a BMW X5 (F15) crashed into the minister of national defense's BMW 750Li xDrive (G12) (both from Military Gendarmerie) in an eight-car pileup on the S8 expressway. Due to the upcoming 2016 Warsaw NATO Summit, the Military Gendarmerie purchased 37 new BMW and Audi cars.

On 10 February 2017, an Audi A8 L Security transporting Prime Minister Beata Szydło hit a tree in Oświęcim at approx. 50 km/h. She suffered minor injuries, but spent the following week in a military hospital in Warsaw; her security guard suffered a leg bone fracture, while the driver was injured. The accident occurred when the government car moving in the three cars motorcade with piloting Audi A6 and closing Audi Q7 using red and blue beacons was overtaking a group of cars on a three-way junction. The Audi driver swerved left to avoid collision with a Fiat Seicento, but still hit the Fiat. The prosecutor accused the Fiat's 21-year-old driver of causing the accident. In 2020 the court found both the Fiat's driver partial guilt, as well as the government motorcade for not using sirens, thus the trial was discontinued. Even before the accident the Interior Ministry announced a major reform in the Government Protection Bureau.
