= Open-field =

Open field may refer to:

- Open-field system, a system of agriculture prevalent throughout Europe from the Middle Ages to the 20th Century
- Open fields doctrine, a U.S. legal doctrine used for evaluating claims of an unreasonable search
- Open Field, album by Taken By Trees
- Open Field (animal test), a measure of general locomotor activity in rodents

== See also ==
- Open (disambiguation)
- Field (disambiguation)
