= Open =

Open or OPEN may refer to:

== Music ==
=== Musicians and groups ===
- Open (band), Australian pop/rock band
- The Open (band), English indie rock band

=== Albums and EPs ===
- Open, a 1967 album by Julie Driscoll, Brian Auger and the Trinity
- Open (Blues Image album), 1970
- Open, a 1979 album by Steve Hillage
- Open (Gerd Dudek, Buschi Niebergall, and Edward Vesala album), 1979
- Open (Gotthard album), 1999
- Open (Cowboy Junkies album), 2001
- Open (YFriday album), 2001
- Open (Shaznay Lewis album), 2004
- Open (Jon Anderson EP), 2011
- Open (Stick Men album), 2012
- Open (The Necks album), 2013
- Open, 2019 album by Louis Baker
- Open (Kwon Eun-bi EP), 2021

=== Songs ===
- "Open" (Queensrÿche song)
- "Open" (Mýa song)
- "Open", the first song on The Cure album Wish

== Literature ==
- Open (Mexican magazine), a lifestyle Mexican publication
- Open (Indian magazine), an Indian weekly English language magazine featuring current affairs
- OPEN (North Dakota magazine), an out-of-print magazine that was printed in the Fargo, North Dakota area of the U.S.
- Open: An Autobiography, tennis player Andre Agassi's 2009 memoir

== Computing and mathematics ==
- Open (process), a program launcher invoked from the command line in NeXTSTEP or Mac OS X
- Open (system call), standardized system call for opening files
- Open set, in mathematics
- Open interval, in mathematics
- Open line segment, in mathematics
- Open map, in mathematics

== Film and television ==
- Open (2011 film), a 2011 film
- Open (2019 film), a 2019 film
- Open TV, television channel in Greece
- Sky Open, a New Zealand television channel
- Open...., the original interactive television service on BSkyBs Sky Digital platform

== Other uses ==
- Open (sport), a competition where entry is open to qualifiers regardless of amateur or professional status
- Online Protection and Enforcement of Digital Trade Act, a bill in the United States Congress to combat online piracy
- Organization of Pakistani Entrepreneurs of North America, a not-for-profit organization
- One-Pair Ethernet, a specification of the OPEN Alliance SIG
- Open Cycle, a bicycle manufacturer

== See also ==
- Opening (disambiguation)
- The Open (disambiguation)
- Open-source software, a type of computer software
- OpenEd, an online catalog of educational media
- Openness, concept or philosophy that is characterized by an emphasis on transparency and collaboration
