= The Open (disambiguation) =

The Open or The Open Championship is one of the four major championships in professional golf.

The Open may also refer to:

- The Open (band), an English indie rock band
- The Open Group, an open software consortium

== See also ==
- Open (disambiguation)
- U.S. Open, various US-hosted sport championships
