= Ercole Spada =

Italian automobile designer (1937–2025)

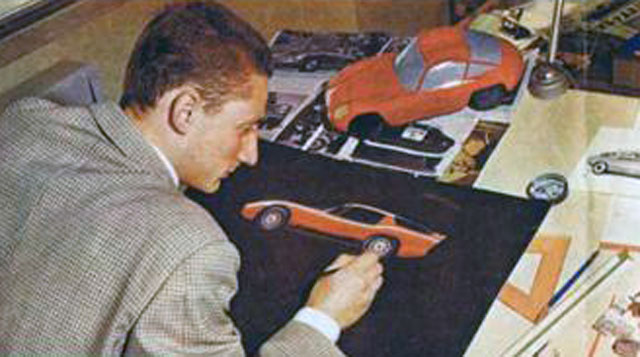
Spada at his drawing desk in the 1960s

Ercole Spada (26 July 1937 – 3 August 2025) was an Italian automobile designer. His most notable designs were produced in the 1960s, for the Zagato design studio house, where Spada was chief stylist. During this period some of the most notable sports cars by Aston Martin, Ferrari, and Maserati, as well as Alfa Romeo, Abarth, Fiat and Lancia were clothed by Spada's designs. Spada's influence can be seen in the Mazda MX-3, which aimed to capture the Alfa Romeo Giulia TZ design, according to its creators.

== Background and early days ==
Spada was born in Busto Arsizio on 26 July 1937. He earned a degree in industrial engineering from Istituto Tecnico Feltrinelli in 1956. Following a military service, he joined Zagato in February 1960.

The first design created by Spada for Zagato was the Aston Martin DB4 GT Zagato. Shortly before leaving Zagato, Spada designed the Alfa Romeo Junior Z, as well as the Lancia Fulvia Sport.

Spada joined Ford in 1970 to become chief designer at the Italian Ghia design house. This led to the creation of the Ford GT70, which did not enter production at the last moment.

== BMW ==
After leaving Ford and following a short stay at Audi, Spada joined BMW's design center as chief stylist in 1976. During his stay with BMW, Spada created two major all-new designs with Claus Luthe, the 7-series (1986–1994), and the BMW E34 5-series (1988–1996).

== I.DE.A ==
In 1983 Spada returned to lead an Italian design house, this time I.DE.A Institute, where he designed a string of compact and luxury cars, for Fiat – the Tipo and Tempra siblings, the Lancia Dedra and Delta II, and the Kappa. Other projects included the Alfa Romeo 155 and the Daihatsu Move. During his stay in I.DE.A Institute, Spada competed and won over major design contracts from Fiat, putting him in direct competition with his fellow Italian designer, Giorgetto Giugiaro.

== Zagato ==
Returning to Zagato in 1992, Spada designed the Ferrari FZ93, based on a regular 512 TR mechanics, as well as other designs.

== Spadaconcept ==
Spada continued to work as a designer. He joined his son, Paulo Spada, to create Spadaconcept, a new design house aimed at automotive and industrial design.

== Death ==
Spada died on 3 August 2025, at the age of 88.

== Notable designs ==
- 1960 Aston Martin DB4 GT Zagato
- 1960 Alfa Romeo Giulietta SZ
- 1960 O.S.C.A 1600 GTZ
- 1960 Alfa Romeo Giulietta SZ2 Coda Tronca
- 1962 Alfa Romeo 2600 SZ
- 1962 Lancia Flavia Sport
- 1963 Alfa Romeo Giulia TZ
- 1963 Lancia Flaminia Super Sport
- 1964 Alfa Romeo Giulia TZ2
- 1965 Lamborghini 3500 GTZ
- 1965 Lancia Fulvia Sport
- 1967 Lancia Flavia Super Sport
- 1967 Fiat 125 GTZ
- 1967 Rover 2000 TCZ
- 1969 Alfa Romeo Junior Z
- 1969 Volvo GTZ
- 1970 Volvo GTZ 3000
- 1970 Ford GT70
- 1972 Iso Varedo
- 1973 Alfa Romeo Scarabeo II
- 1987 BMW 7 Series (E32)
- 1988 BMW 5 Series (E34)
- 1988 Ferrari PPG Indy Pace Car
- 1988 Fiat Tipo
- 1989 Lancia Dedra
- 1990 Fiat Tempra
- 1992 Alfa Romeo 155
- 1993 Ferrari FZ93, renamed ES1
- 1993 Lancia Delta II
- 1993 Nissan Terrano II
- 1994 Lancia Kappa
- 2001 OSCA 2500 GT Dromos
- 2008 Spada Codatronca
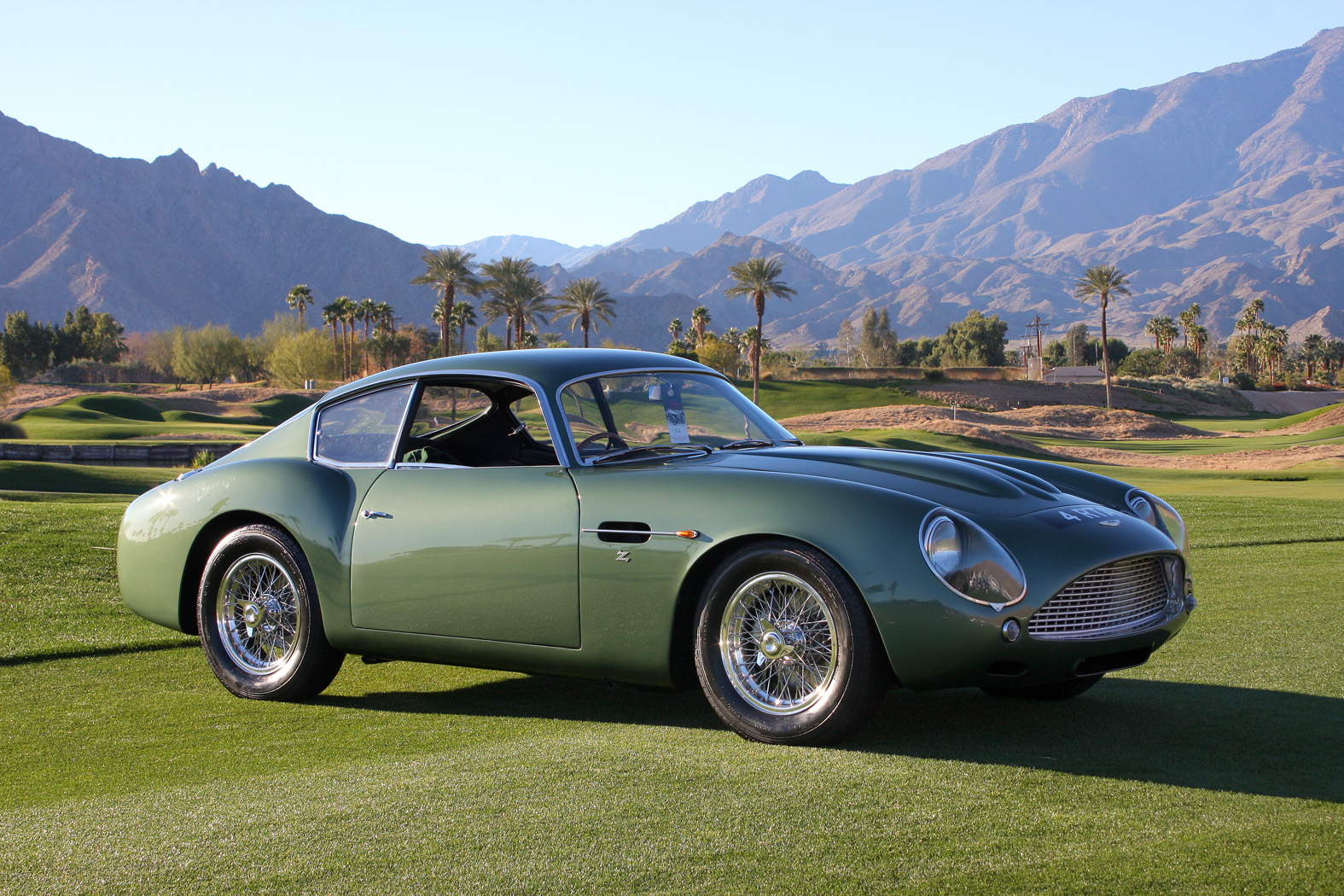
Aston Martin DB4 GT Zagato

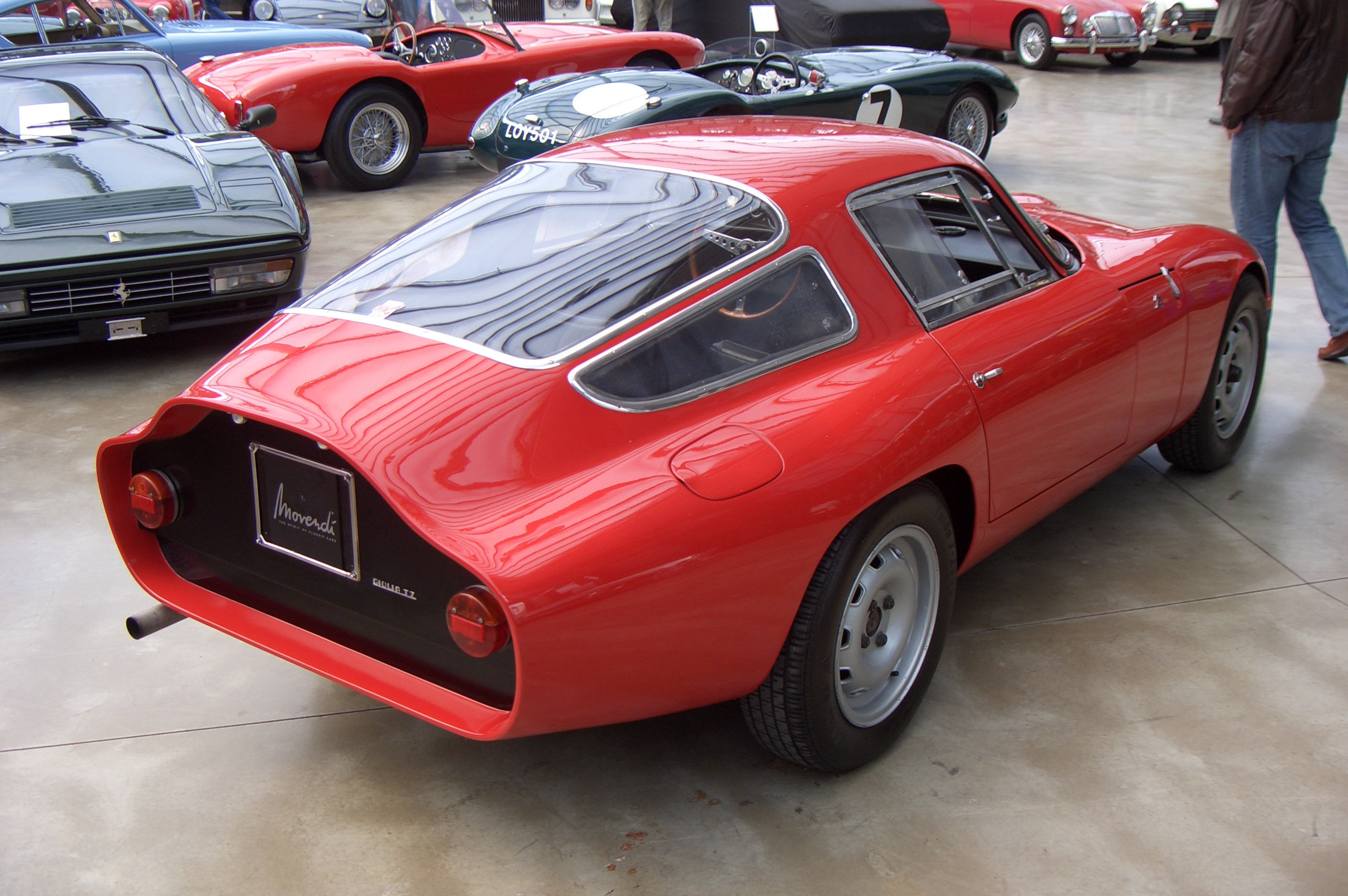
Alfa Romeo Giulia TZ

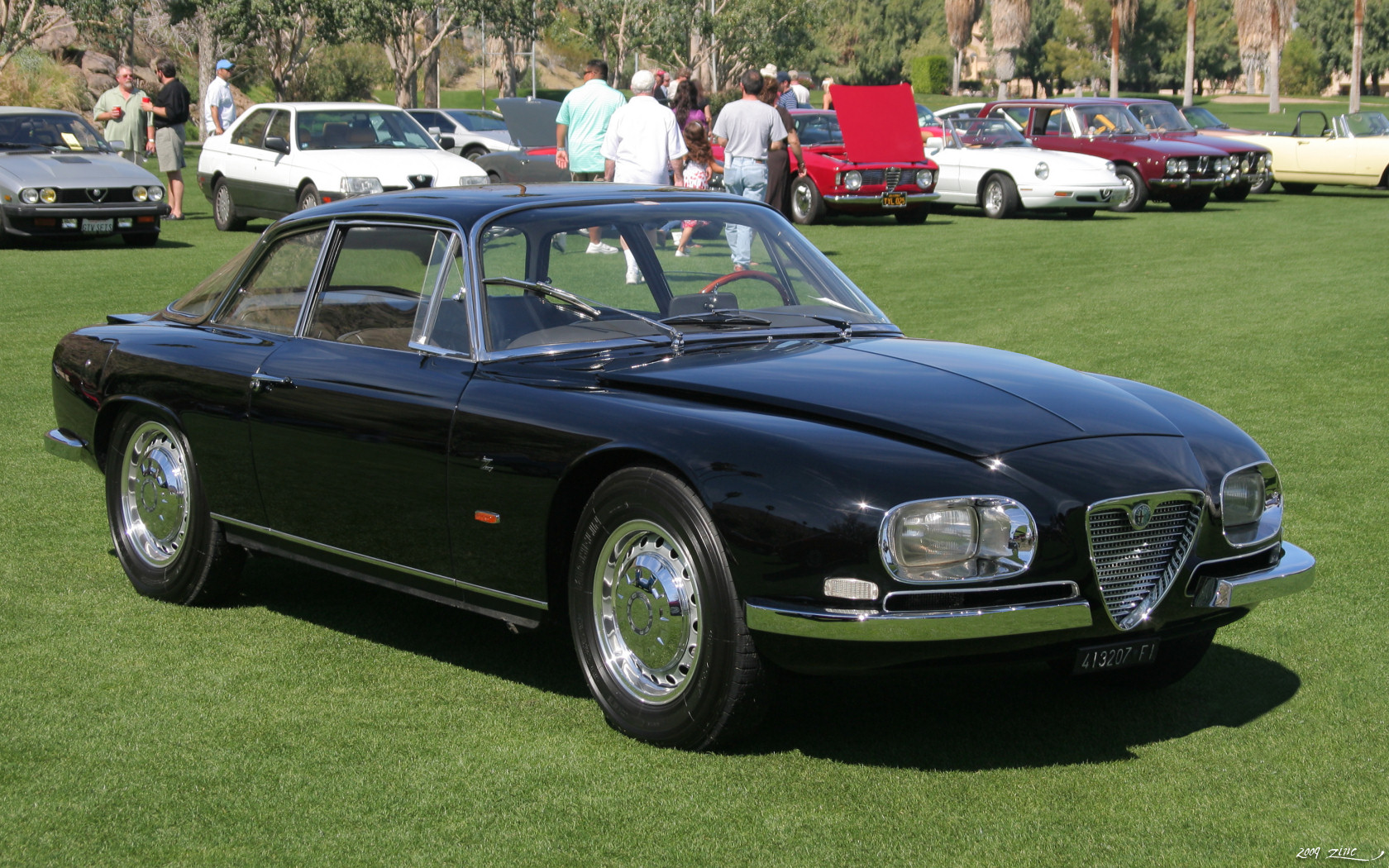
Alfa Romeo 2600 SZ

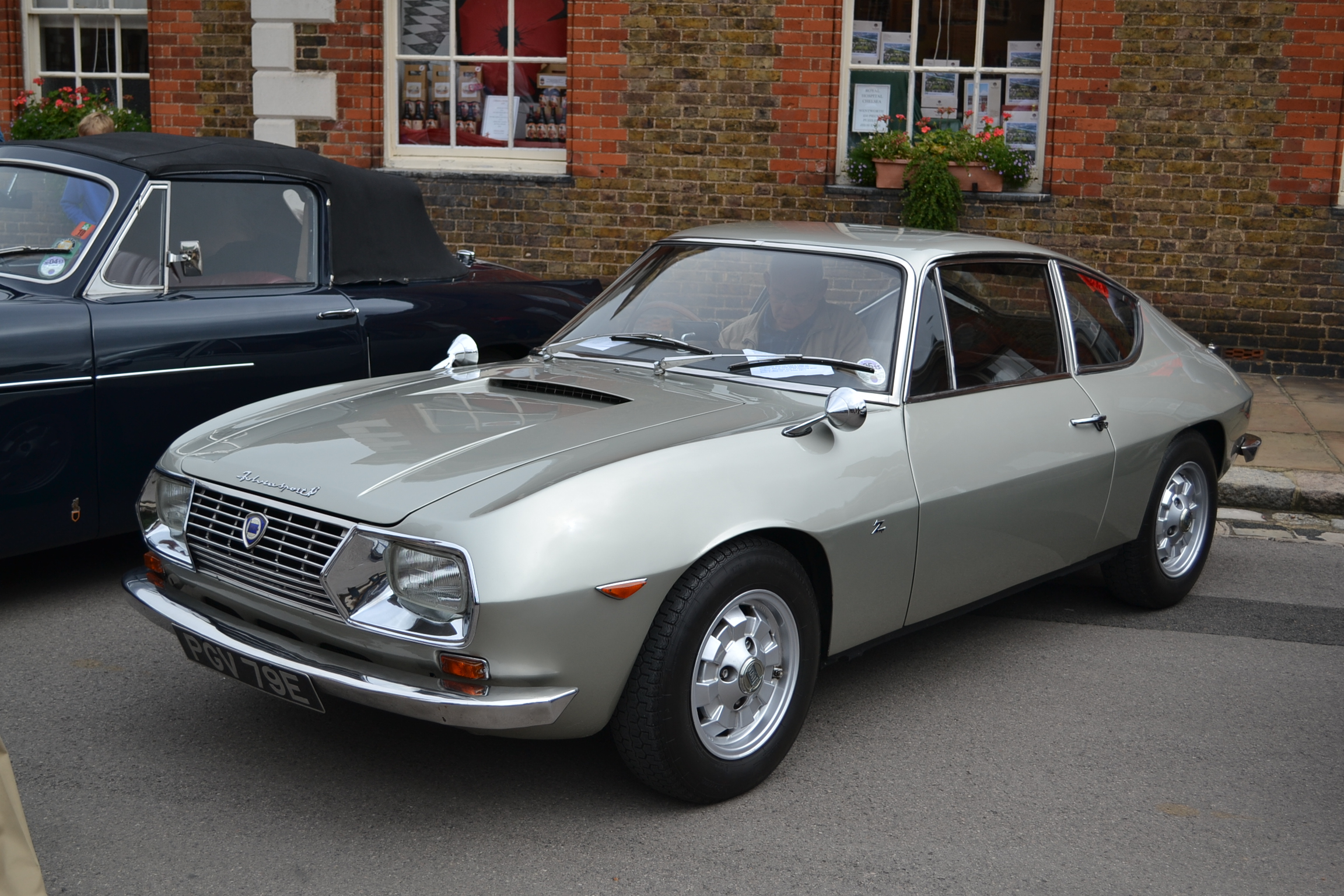
Series I Lancia Fulvia Sport 1.3 S

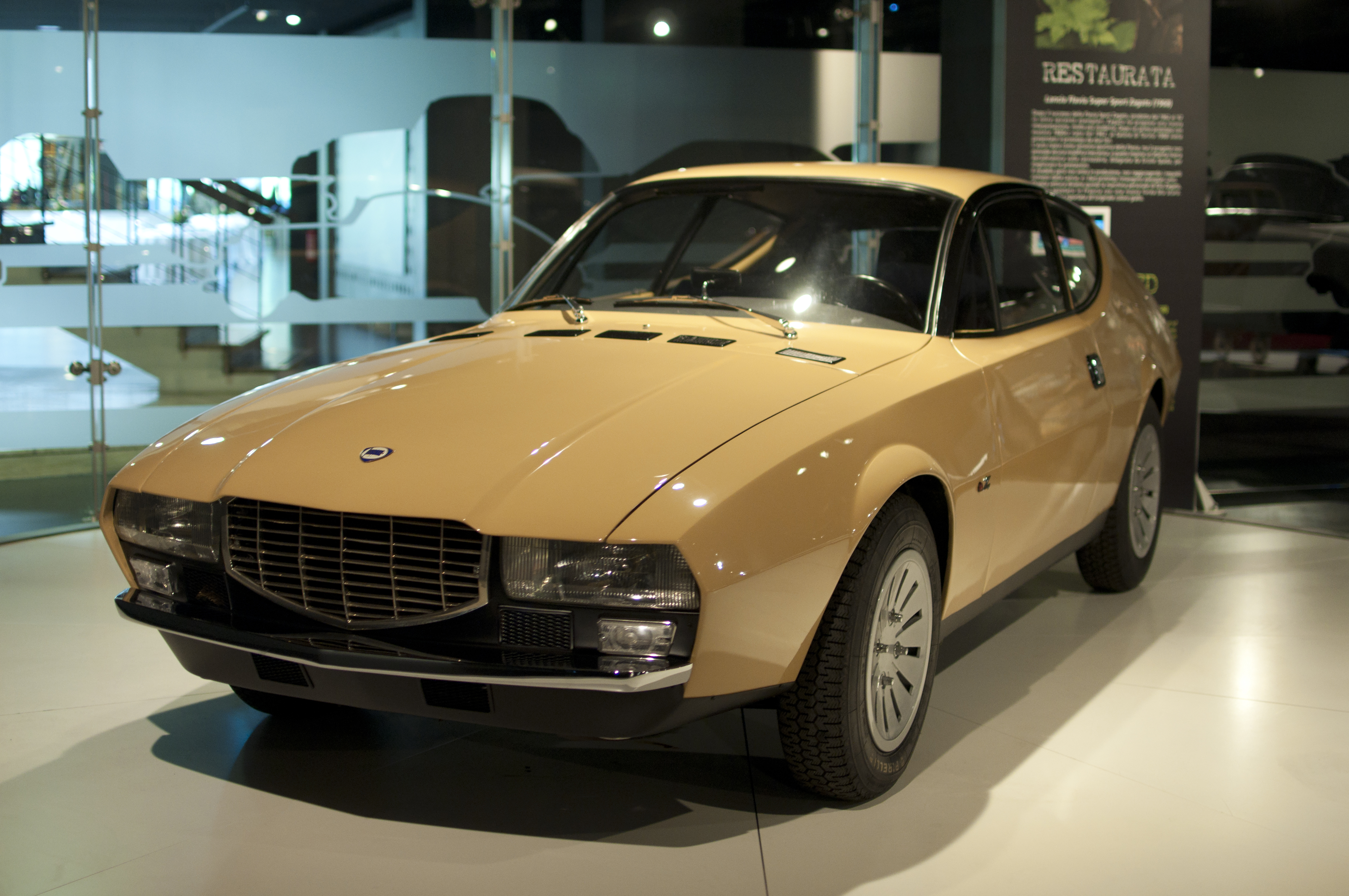
Lancia Flavia Super Sport

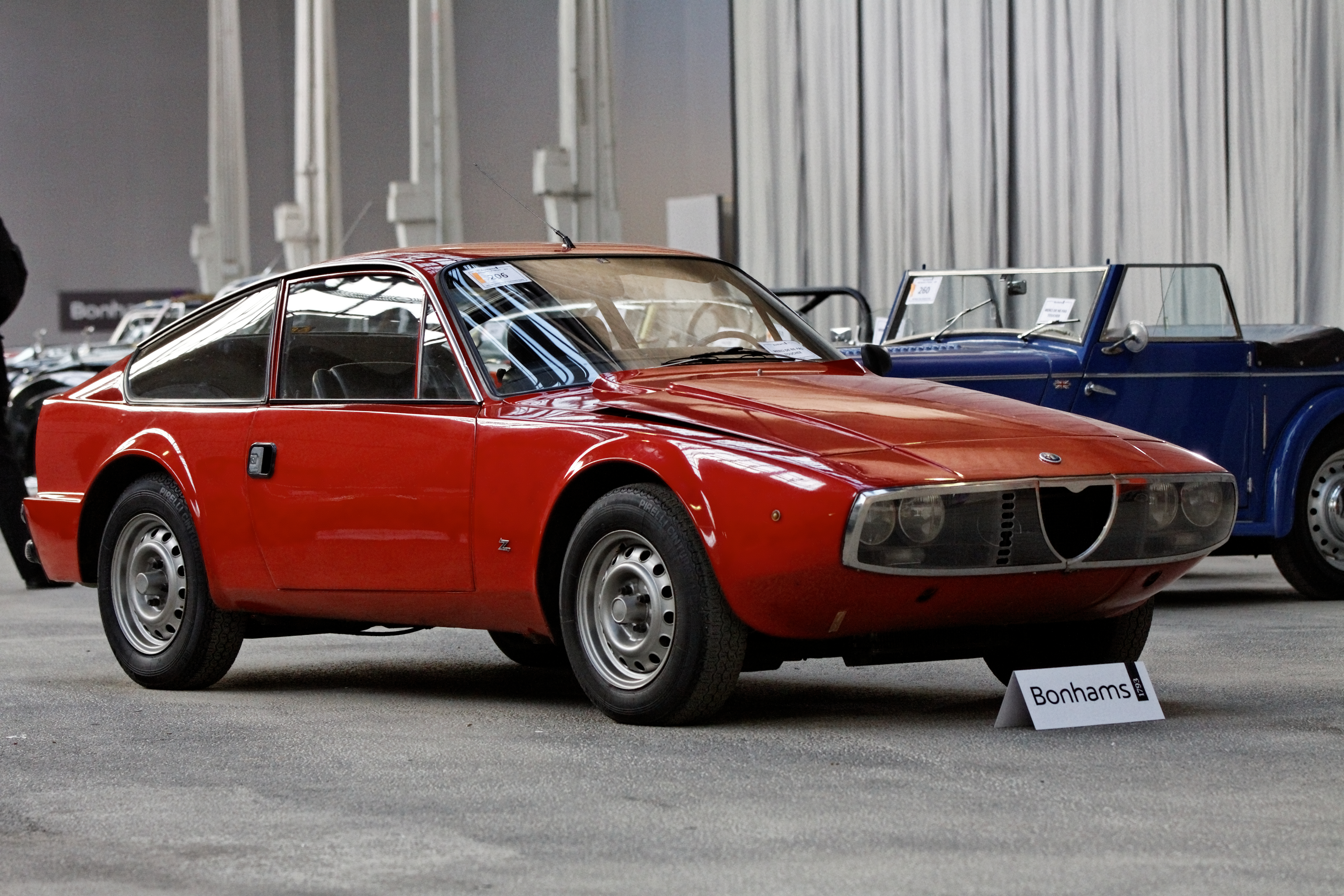
Alfa Romeo Junior Z

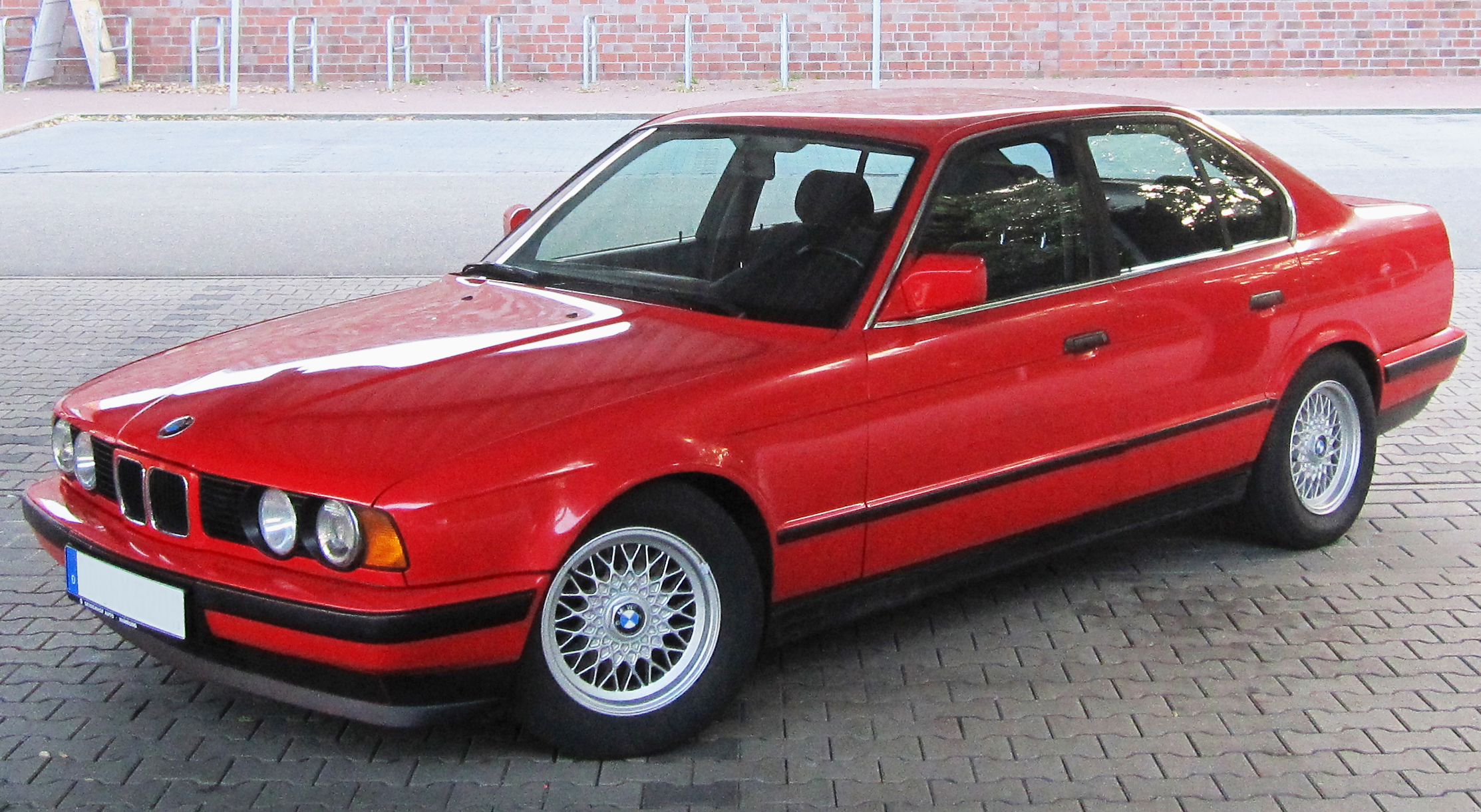
BMW 5 Series (E34)

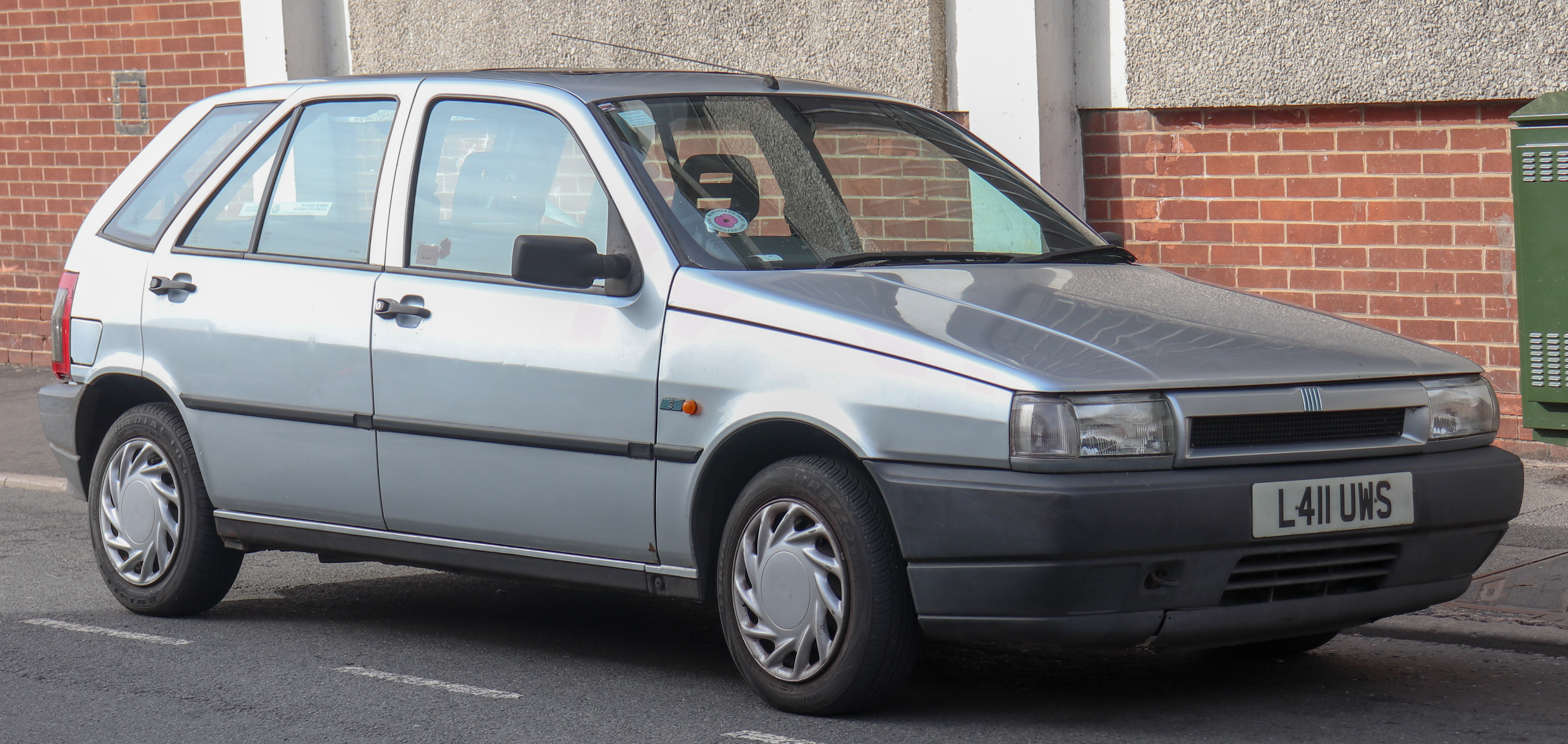
Fiat Tipo (type 160)

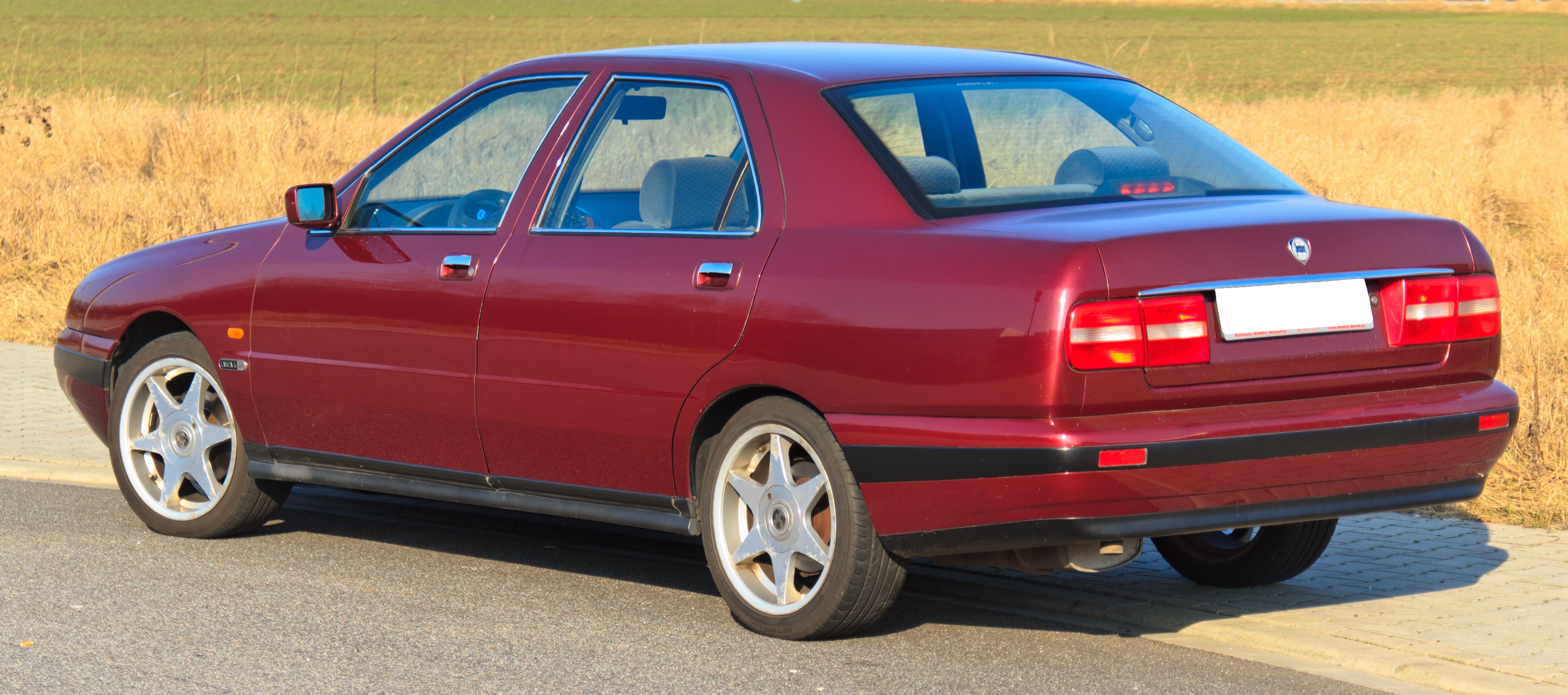
Lancia Kappa

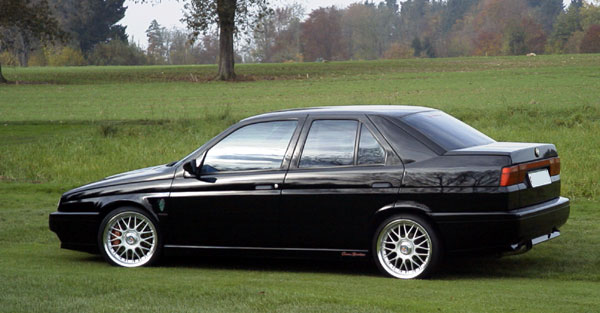
Alfa Romeo 155

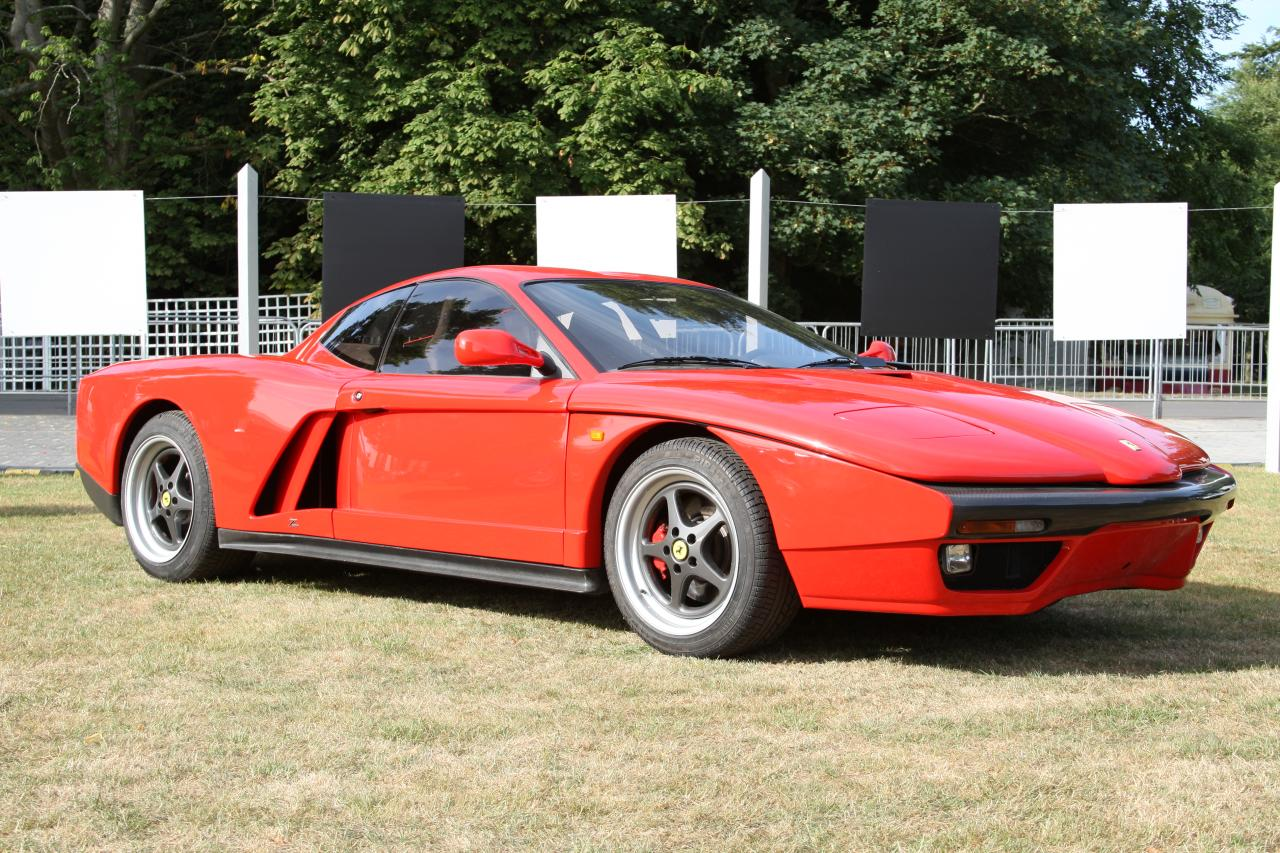
The Ferrari FZ93 at the 2010 Goodwood Festival of Speed

== Sources ==
- Ercole Spada himself
- ERCOLE SPADA – 40 Years Devoted to Car Design, Car Styling Magazine, Volume 131 (July 1999)
- Penny Sparke, A Century of Car Design (2002)
- Paolo Tumminelli, Car Design (2004)
- Robert Edwards Aston Martin: Ever the Thoroughbred (2003)
- Michele Marchianò, Le Zagato – Fulvia Sport / Junior Z (2005)
- Carlo Stella and Bruno Vettore, Zagato Fulvia Sport Competizione (2003)
- Hilton Holloway and Martin Buckley, A–Z of Cars (2002)
- Winston Scott Goodfellow, Iso Rivolta: The Men, the Machines (2001)
- Zagato design studies
- Zagato. The Origins
- "World Premiere - Spada TS Codatronca". Classic Driver Magazine. 17 April 2007.
