= Ford GT70 =

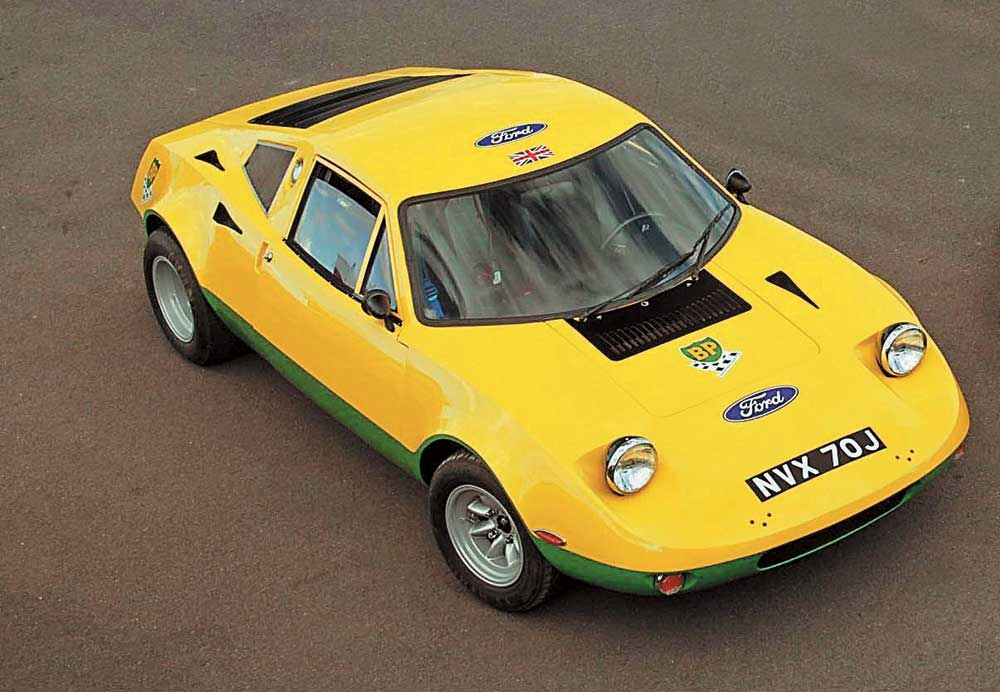
- Ford GT70

Overview
- Manufacturer: Ford UK
- Production: 1970-1973; 6 produced
- Designer: Ercole Spada

Body and chassis
- Class: Sports car
- Body style: 2-door coupé
- Layout: Mid-engine, rear-wheel-drive

Powertrain
- Engine: 1.6 litres (98 in^{3}) I4; 2.6 litres (160 in^{3}) V6
- Transmission: 5-speed manual

Dimensions
- Wheelbase: 2,330 mm (91.7 in)
- Length: 3,890 mm (153.1 in)
- Width: 1,730 mm (68.1 in)
- Height: 1,120 mm (44.1 in)
- Kerb weight: 765 kg (1,687 lb)

The Ford GT70 was a limited production sports car designed by Ercole Spada, made by Ford UK in 1970 and intended for use in the World Rally Championship. Designed to compete with high speed rally cars such as the Porsche 911 and Renault Alpine, the GT70 featured a mid-mounted engine with rear-wheel-drive. Len Bailey, who had been the chief engineer on the Ford GT40 project, was enlisted to help design the bodywork and chassis. The GT70 had little success in rallying as it suffered numerous problems such as the frame not being stiff enough, the cockpit being cramped and the V6 in the original cars having too high a centre of gravity. Rule changes in the World Rally Championship as well as the fact that the already developed Escort platform was showing more promise caused Ford engineers to abandon the platform, and in 1973 the GT70 program ended.

== Performance ==
The GT70 was initially designed to use a range of engines, with the first ones being fitted with the 2.6-litre Cologne V6 from the Ford Capri RS2600 developing 240 bhp (179 kW). One of the cars run by Ford France later had its V6 swapped for a 1.6-litre Cosworth BDA straight-four engine in order to reduce the center of gravity for racing. The GT70s also wore fiberglass bodies to save weight and were fitted with 13 inch four stud, four spoke wheels designed especially for the car by Len Bailey.

== Production ==
Only six GT70s were ever built. One was run in the 1971 Ronde Cevenole Rally in France, driven by Roger Clark, but was plagued by engine, suspension and braking problems. Another ran in the 1971 Tour de France Automobile driven by Francois Mazet with partner Jean Todt. Unfortunately, they were unable to finish after colliding with a bridge parapet in the Alps. A third was modified by Ford France with a 1.6 litre Cosworth BDA I4, 5-speed Hewland gearbox and a BP livery and was run in the 1972 and 1973 French tarmac championships with Guy Chasseuil as the driver. One chassis was used as a press car, and another was used for race car development. The GT70 originally modified and run by Ford France was restored in 2002, and fitted with a 2-litre Cosworth BDG engine.

== GT-70 concept car ==
The remaining 6th chassis was fitted with a body designed by Filippo Sapino at Ford Design Europe studio in Turin and realised by newly acquired Carrozzeria Ghia. The subsequent concept car was shown at the 1971 Turin Auto Show. The car featured a flat decklid and faux fastback buttresses.
