= First inauguration of Kassym-Jomart Tokayev =

First presidential inauguration of Kassym-Jomart Tokayev
- Date: 12 June 2019; 7 years ago
- Time: 11:00 UTC+06:00
- Location: Independence Palace, Nur-Sultan
- Participants: Kassym-Jomart Tokayev; Acting president of Kazakhstan — Assuming office Kairat Mami; Chairman of the Constitutional Council — Administering oath

The first inauguration of Kassym-Jomart Tokayev as the president of Kazakhstan took place on Wednesday, 12 June 2019, at the Independence Palace in Nur-Sultan. The event marked the formal commencement of President Tokayev's five-year term, following a historic and peaceful transition of power for the first time in Kazakhstan's history. This transition occurred after Tokayev emerged victorious in the 2019 presidential election, succeeding Nursultan Nazarbayev, who resigned from office in March 2019. Prior to his inauguration, Tokayev had served as acting president.

== Background ==
On 19 March 2019, Nursultan Nazarbayev, the then-president of Kazakhstan, announced his resignation from office, following nearly three decades of leadership. In accordance with constitutional provisions, Kassym-Jomart Tokayev, who was serving as the chairman of the Senate of Kazakhstan, assumed temporary duties to fulfill the remainder of Nazarbayev's presidential term. Tokayev officially took the oath of office in front of both houses of the Parliament on 20 March 2019, thereby assuming the role of acting president. Among Tokayev's initial actions upon assuming office was the decision to call for a snap presidential election in April 2019, in which Tokayev himself participated in the race as the leading candidate to succeed Nazarbayev.

In the 2019 presidential election, Tokayev secured a victory with over 71% of the vote, according to both preliminary results and exit polls. However, the election was not without controversy, particularly regarding allegations of electoral irregularities and lack of genuine competition.

== Planning ==
The inauguration of the President of Kazakhstan follows a specific schedule as outlined in Article 42, Section II of the Constitution. Ordinarily, it occurs on the second Wednesday of January. However, deviations from this schedule may occur under certain circumstances:

- If the President is elected through early elections or assumes acting presidency as stipulated in Article 48, Section II of the Constitution, the inauguration ceremony must take place within one month from the date of publication of the presidential election results or assumption of presidential powers.
- In such cases, the specific date for taking the oath of office is determined by the Central Election Commission (CEC).

Following his victory in the 2019 election, Tokayev announced during the Aqorda press conference on 10 June 2019 that the presidential inauguration would take place on 12 June, emphasizing the urgent need for working visit travel to Kyrgyzstan and Tajikistan for "major international events". However, Tokayev also made it clear that the CEC needed to complete the task of summarizing the preliminary election results and publishing an official final report by that time. That same day, the CEC announced final results, officially confirming Tokayev's win and thus becoming the president-elect.

== Pre-inaugural events ==
Before the inauguration commenced, the Palace of Independence in the capital of Nur-Sultan resonated with ceremonial music at 10:46 UTC+6, setting a solemn and dignified tone. Additionally, the Kazakh flag, constitution, and presidential standard were methodically and formally introduced into the hall, adhering to established protocols and emphasizing their symbolic importance in the proceedings.

== Inaugural events ==
=== Ceremony ===
At 11:04 UTC+6, former president Nursultan Nazarbayev entered the halls of the Palace of Independence who was then accompanied by his successor Kassym-Jomart Tokayev to take the stage.

Kairat Mami, chairman of the Constitutional Council, then administered the oath of office to Tokayev, who then at 11:07 UTC+ placed his right hand to the Constitution and solemnly recited the oath in Kazakh:

"I solemnly swear that I will faithfully serve the people of Kazakhstan, strictly observe the Constitution and laws of the Republic of Kazakhstan, guarantee the rights and freedoms of citizens, conscientiously perform the high duties of the President of the Republic of Kazakhstan entrusted to me."

Following the oath, Tokayev reverently kissed the Kazakh flag.

After being sworn, the inauguration ceremony proceeded outside of Palace of Independence to the Qazaq Eli Square at 11:09 UTC+6, where cannon salutes resounded as the Menıñ Qazaqstanym national anthem played with five-gun cannons being fired in honor of the head of state's mandate, as a symbol for the five-year presidential term. And during the performance of the anthem, the 21-gun salute was sounded as part of an international norm. It was observed that during the inauguration, military personnel were seen raising the flag over the Aqorda Presidential Palace as the national anthem played, a notable procedure observed which was absent during the 2015 inauguration of Nursultan Nazarbayev.

After the national anthem, Tokayev was presented with the president's certificate, badge, and standard by Berik Imaşev, the chairman of the Central Election Commission.

==== Inaugural address ====
Tokayev commenced his inauguration speech from 11:15 UTC+6, expressing gratitude to the voters who supported him in the election. He emphasized that the election was conducted in a manner that he deemed fair and "in accordance with democratic principles," stating, "My ultimate goal is to protect the interests of every citizen. I will not allow anyone or anything to drive a wedge between us, based on a difference of political views or positions." From there, he outlined key priorities, including continuing the strategic direction set by former president Nursultan Nazarbayev, addressing social issues, supporting entrepreneurship, ensuring societal unity, and defending national interests. Tokayev delineated his priorities under 10 directions, which encompassed ensuring economic growth, eradicating corruption, reforming the judicial and law enforcement systems, creating new jobs, solving the housing problem, implementing fair social policies, promoting regional development, upholding spiritual values, maintaining a balanced foreign policy, and empowering the youth. Additionally, Tokayev unveiled the establishment of the National Council of Public Trust as a platform for inclusive dialogue and participation of all segments of society in decision-making processes. Tokayev reaffirmed Kazakhstan's commitment to a balanced foreign policy and expressed confidence in overcoming challenges for national prosperity under his leadership.

=== Parade ===
After the swearing-in ceremony, Tokayev exited the Palace of Independence hall at 11:30 UTC+6, greeted by applause from the guests, and made his way to Qazaq Eli Square. The solemn procession of the Armed Forces of the Republic of Kazakhstan began at 11:32 UTC+6, showcasing the Kazakhstan's military strength and dedication to security. In his role as the Supreme Commander-in-Chief, Tokayev observed the parade alongside Defense Minister Nurlan Ermekbaev. Finally, at 11:40 UTC+6, the ceremony concluded with a parade of the Armed Forces.

== Guests ==
The inauguration ceremony was attended by approximately 2,500 people, comprising a diverse array of dignitaries and representatives. Among the attendees were the First President of Kazakhstan – Elbasy Nursultan Nazarbayev, parliamentary deputies, members of the government, Supreme Court judges, and members of the Constitutional Council. Additionally, representatives from various governmental bodies such as the Presidential Administration, the Office of the Prime Minister, and the Central Election Commission were present. The ceremony also welcomed members of the Assembly of People of Kazakhstan, religious leaders, and regional akims. Notably, presidential candidates, Nur Otan party leadership, and members of national and regional public staff participated in the event, alongside representatives from non-governmental organizations, media outlets, and business communities. Prominent public figures from the fields of science, culture, and art, as well as leaders of Kazakh youth organizations, were also present in the inauguration.

It was also noted that the inauguration ceremony marked a significant departure from tradition as it held without the presence of foreign guests. The ceremony exclusively welcomed the diplomatic representatives accredited in Kazakhstan, representing a departure from previous inaugurations that often hosted international dignitaries.

== See also ==
- Kazakh presidential inauguration
