= Spada Codatronca =

Spada Codatronca TS Spada Codatronca Monza

Overview
- Manufacturer: Spada Vetture Sport
- Production: 2008–present (TS); 2012–present (Monza)
- Assembly: Turin, Italy
- Designer: Ercole Spada

Body and chassis
- Class: Sports car (S)
- Layout: FR layout
- Related: Tirrito Ayrton

Powertrain
- Engine: 7.0L Chevrolet LS7 V8
- Transmission: 6-speed manual

Dimensions
- Length: 4,659 mm (183.4 in)
- Width: 1,942 mm (76.5 in)
- Height: 1,235 mm (48.6 in)
- Curb weight: 1,360 kg (2,998 lb)

The Spada Codatronca (sometimes called the SVS Codatronca) is an Italian-built supercar introduced by Spada Vetture Sport in 2008. A convertible version, the Spada Codatronca Monza, was introduced in 2012. Both cars used a modified chassis and engine from the Chevrolet Corvette C6, but featured all-new bodywork.

== Codatronca TS ==
Released in 2008, the Codatronca TS was the first car in the Spada Codatronca line, and featured styling based on that of the Alfa Romeo TZ. The car uses a 7-litre Chevrolet LS7 V8 engine, but with the power output increased to 630 hp (470 kW; 639 PS) at 6,500 rpm, and 668 N⋅m (493 lb⋅ft) of torque. The chassis was derived from that used by the Chevrolet Corvette C6, but featured all-new bodywork. The bodywork is made from carbon-fibre, whilst the aluminium chassis features a roll cage. The Codatronca TS is claimed to be able to accelerate from 0 to 100 km/h in 3.4 seconds, and reach a top speed of 340 km/h (211 mph). It uses Brembo disc brakes all around; 380 mm (15.0 in) discs with eight-piston aluminium calipers at the front, and 355 mm (14.0 in) discs with four-piston aluminium calipers at the rear. 19" OZ alloy wheels are fitted, and shod with Pirelli P-Zero Corsa tyres; 285/35 R19 at the front, and 345/35 R19 at the rear. A more powerful TSS version was planned, but never produced.

== Codatronca Monza ==
In 2011, Spada Vetture Sport announced that they would be building a convertible version of the Codatronca TS, named the Codatronca Monza. The Monza used a supercharged version of the Codatronca TS' 7-litre V8, and produced a claimed 710 hp (529 kW; 720 PS) and 701 lb⋅ft (950 N⋅m) of torque. The Codatronca Monza also featured the Italian Air Force roundel on the sides of the vehicle. Spada claimed that the car could accelerate from 0 to 60 mph in three seconds, and reach a top speed of 208 mph (335 km/h). The Codatronca Monza appeared at the 2012 Geneva Auto Show, where a competition version was also announced.
