= Lancia Kappa =

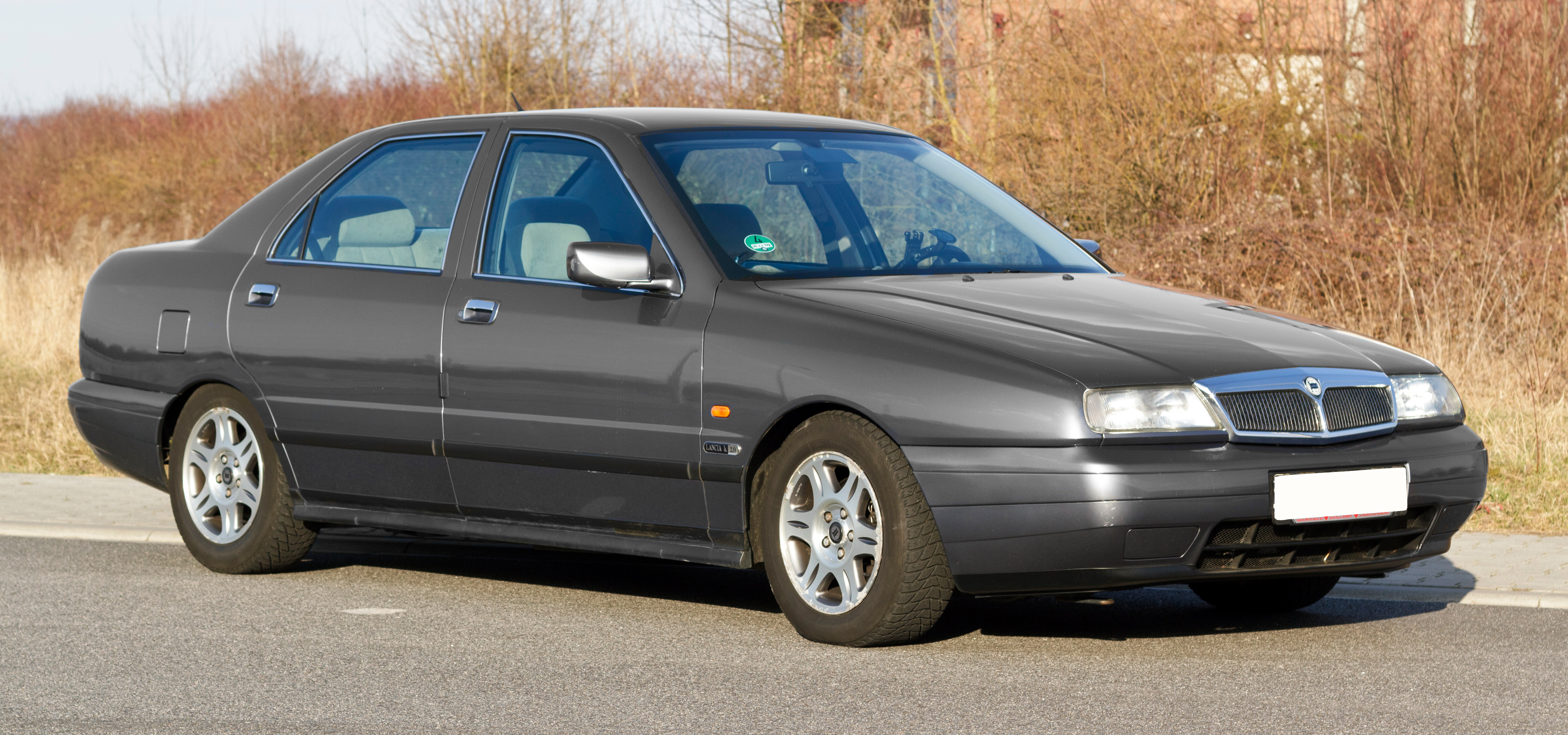

Overview
- Manufacturer: Lancia
- Also called: Lancia k
- Production: August 1994 – July 2000 (saloon); 1996 – July 2000 (estate); April 1997 – April 2000 (coupé)
- Assembly: Italy: Saloon: Rivalta plant, Turin; Coupé: Chivasso (Maggiora); Estate: Turin (Pininfarina)
- Designer: Ercole Spada at I.DE.A Institute (saloon); Centro Stile Lancia under Enrico Fumia (coupé); Pininfarina (estate)

Body and chassis
- Class: Executive car (E)
- Body style: 4-door saloon 5-door estate 2-door coupé
- Layout: Front-engine, front-wheel-drive
- Platform: Type E
- Related: Alfa Romeo 166

Powertrain
- Engine: Petrol: 2.0 L Fiat 838A4 16V turbo I4; 2.0 L Fiat family C 20V I5; 2.0 L Fiat family C 20V turbo I5; 2.4 L Fiat family C 20V I5; 3.0 L Alfa Romeo 24V V6; Diesel: 2.4 L turbo I5; 2.4 L JTD common rail turbo I5
- Transmission: 5-speed manual; 4-speed AISIN or ZF automatic

Dimensions
- Wheelbase: Saloon/estate: 2,700 mm (110 in); Coupé: 2,580 mm (102 in)
- Length: Saloon/estate: 4,687 mm (184.5 in); Coupé: 4,567 mm (179.8 in)
- Width: Saloon/estate: 1,826 mm (71.9 in); Coupé: 1,830 mm (72 in)
- Height: Saloon/estate: 1,462 mm (57.6 in); Coupé: 1,425 mm (56.1 in)
- Curb weight: 1,425 kg (3,142 lb)-1,580 kg (3,483 lb)

Chronology
- Predecessor: Lancia Thema
- Successor: Lancia Thesis

The Lancia Kappa or Lancia k (Type 838) is an executive car manufactured and marketed by Italian automaker Lancia from August 1994 to July 2000. It seats five passengers and shares its platform with the Alfa Romeo 166. The Kappa was produced with saloon, estate, and coupé body styles. It was only built with left-hand drive and has a front-engine, front-wheel-drive layout.

After its debut at the 1994 Paris Auto Show, production reached 117,216 units, over six years. The Kappa was manufactured at the Fiat factory in Tetti Francesi, Rivalta di Torino and was designed by the Centro Stile Lancia in collaboration with the I.DE.A Institute.

Lancia had earlier used the Kappa nameplate for the 1919 Kappa, with evolutions called Dikappa and Trikappa).

== Overview ==
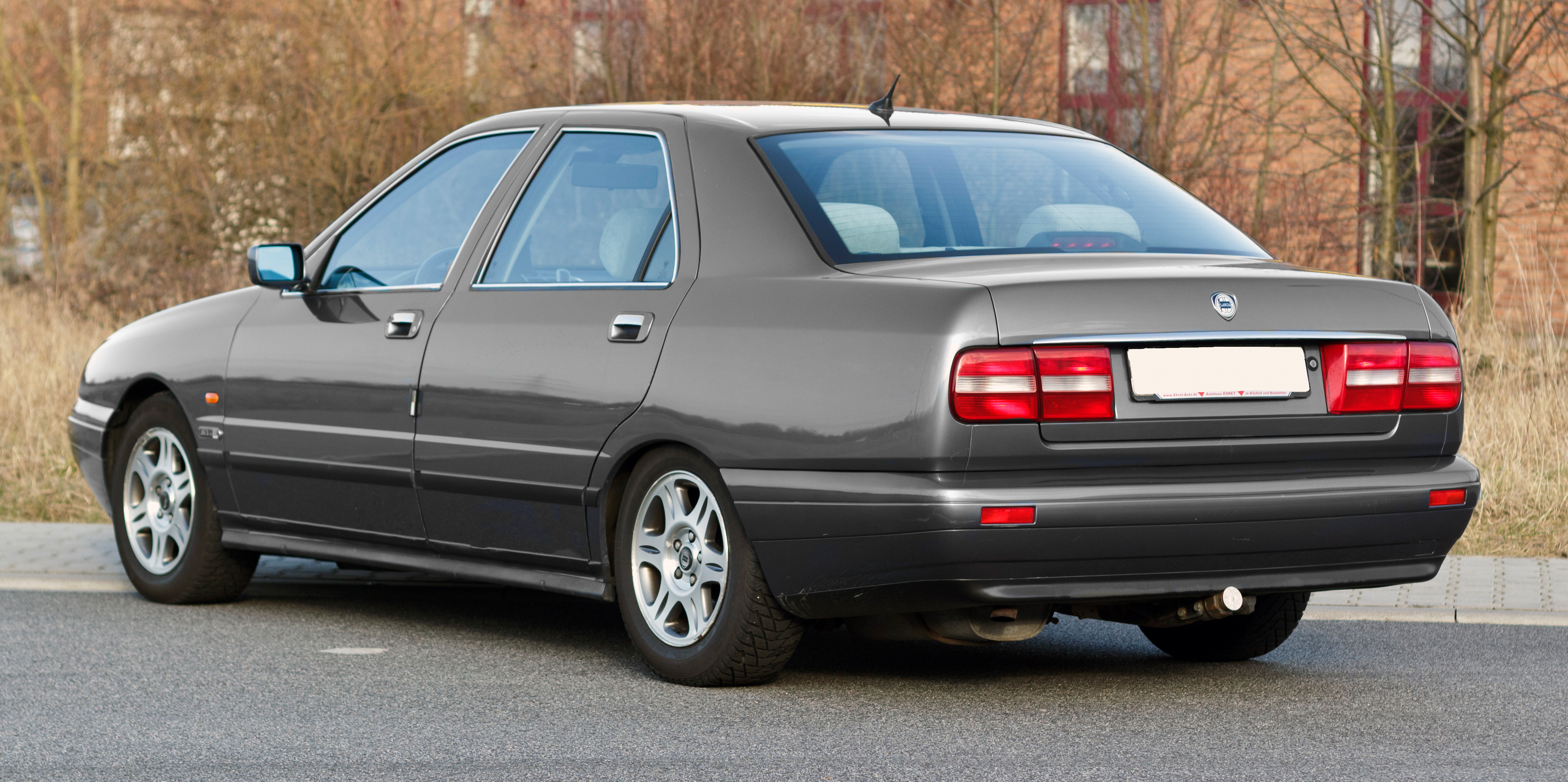
Rear view

The Kappa nameplate followed Lancia's frequent use of Greek letters for its model names, in this case the tenth letter of the Greek alphabet. In writing, Lancia often referred to the Kappa simply as the k (lower case "k"), which is fairly similar to the original Greek letter κ.

In Poland, where Fiat Auto is the largest domestic car manufacturer, the Kappa served as the official government car (replacing the Thema).

Autocar's Peter Robinson reviewed the Kappa in November 1994. He commented on the car's bland styling which was justified by Fiat's Paolo Cantarella on the basis that the designers did not want to create too much "visual noise". The body was reported as having twice the torsional rigidity of the outgoing Thema and as 15 percent stiffer than any of its rivals. The automatic Aisin-Warner gearbox (50-40 LE type) was shared with the Volvo 850. Robinson went on to say "the Kappa´s dimensions ensure a commodious interior, the impression of space only heightened by a low cowl and very Japanese-looking fascia, somewhere between a Honda NSX and Lexus LS400." Rear cabin room was described as "immense" but the cushion was criticised for being too flat, a fault rectified in later iterations of the car. Robinson criticised the "horrid mock wood with which Lancia frames the prominent central console that runs from the handbrake, up the full length of the dash and over the top." About the driving characteristics, Robinson wrote: "If Lancia quietened the starter motor, this would be one refined drivetrain...with no hint of any 5-cylinder unevenness." The 2.4 litre engine tested appeared to have been tuned for low-end torque, a characteristic of this Alpine brand. The engine was praised by Robinson for its "smooth responsiveness" and "torque steer has been eliminated...and the Servotronic steering is terrific, with just the right degree of self-centering." His summary of ride and handling was that the car was better than average but not class-leading: "On the Lancia there is too much body roll and the front grip in the wet didn't inspire confidence."

== Model history ==
- 1994 - Kappa production begins.
- 1996 - The estate body style, marketed as Station Wagon, joins the lineup. The naturally aspirated 2.0-litre gasoline engine is fitted with a variable geometry inlet manifold. Inside the cabin, the seats are replaced by a new design, including new upholstery patterns.
- 1997 - The coupé body style is launched, while at the same time, some changes are made to the interior, trunk, suspension and engine bay, as well as new alloy wheels made available.
- 1998 - The 2.0 L turbocharged four-cylinder engine gets replaced by the five-cylinder engine, while the turbodiesel was upgraded to a JTD engine. The bumper guards, previously black, are changed to body-coloured, and the base trim level, LE, is dropped, leaving only the more lavish LS and LX. At the same time, a special trim level is introduced for the turbocharged gasoline engine, called simply the "Turbo", distinguished by the lack of chrome decals around the window frames. The interior materials are also upgraded across the lineup, including the addition of a leather-wrapped steering wheel with a different design and front central armrest.
- 1999 - The other two five-cylinder engines are modified along with the air conditioning unit.
- 2000 - The Kappa gains xenon HID headlamps. Production of the sedan and SW versions ceased in July 2000 (The coupé's production came to a halt earlier in the year). The total production of the Kappa Berlina was 104,752 cars.

== Kappa SW and Coupé ==
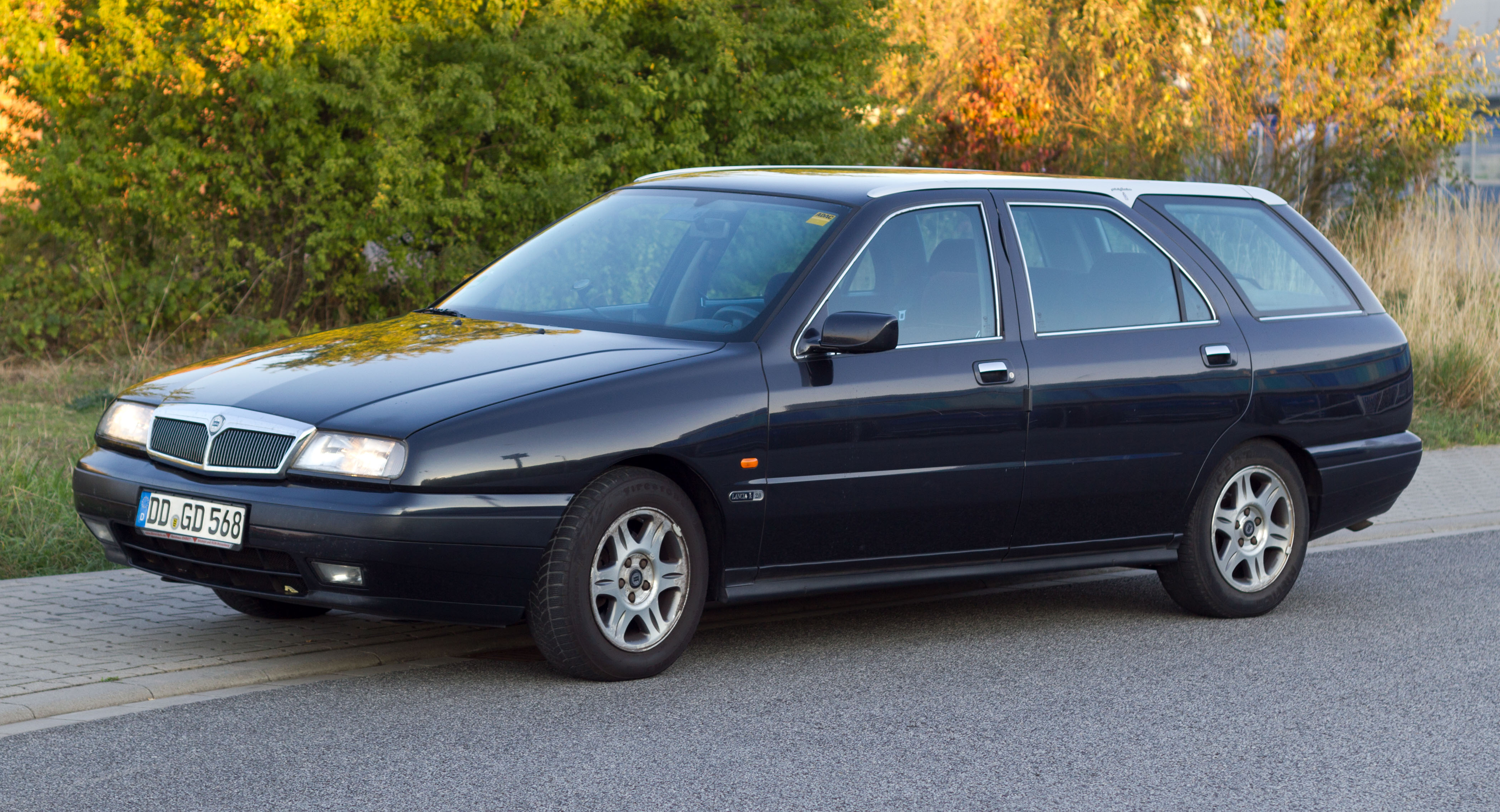
Lancia Kappa SW front view

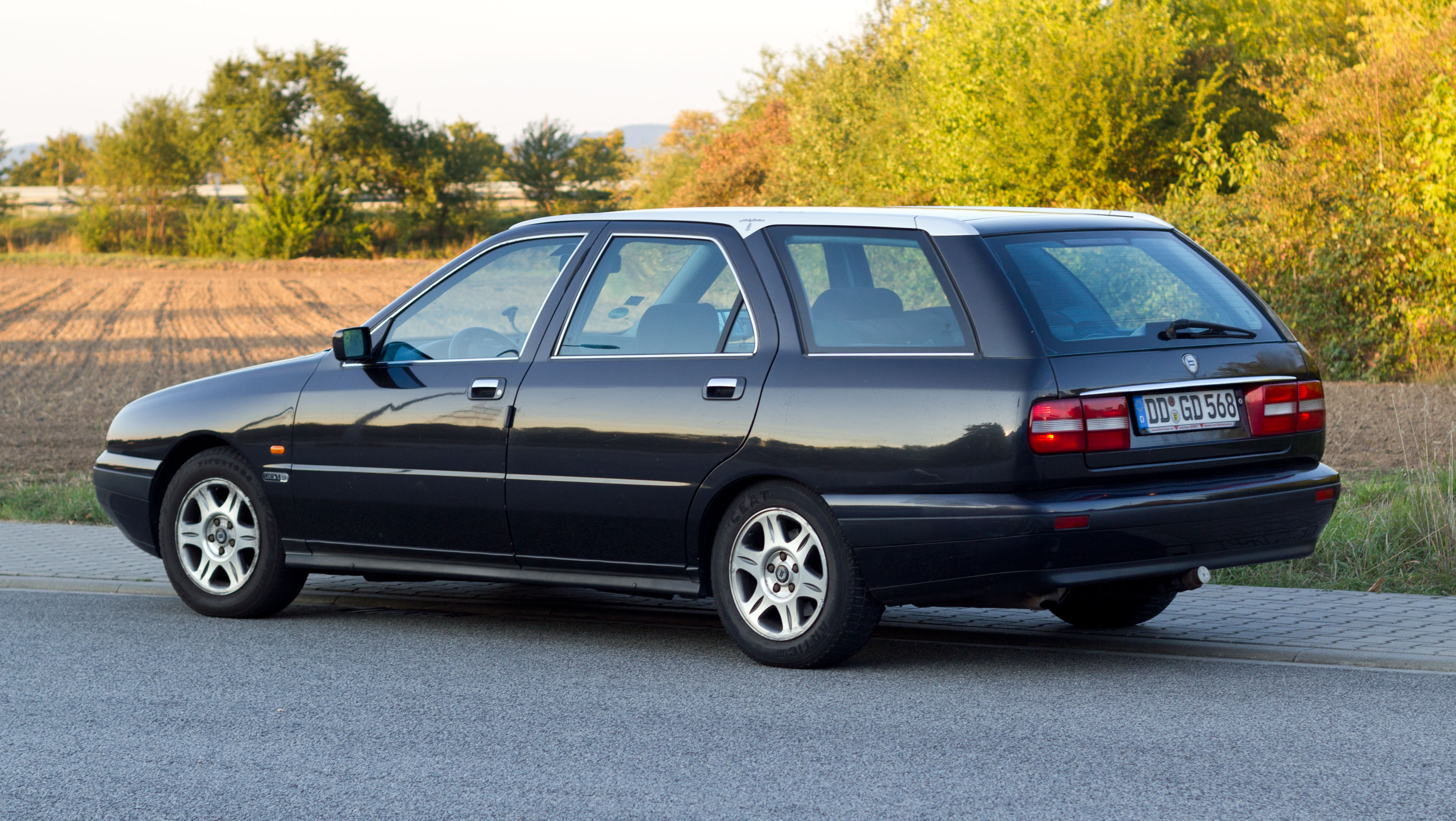
Lancia Kappa SW rear view

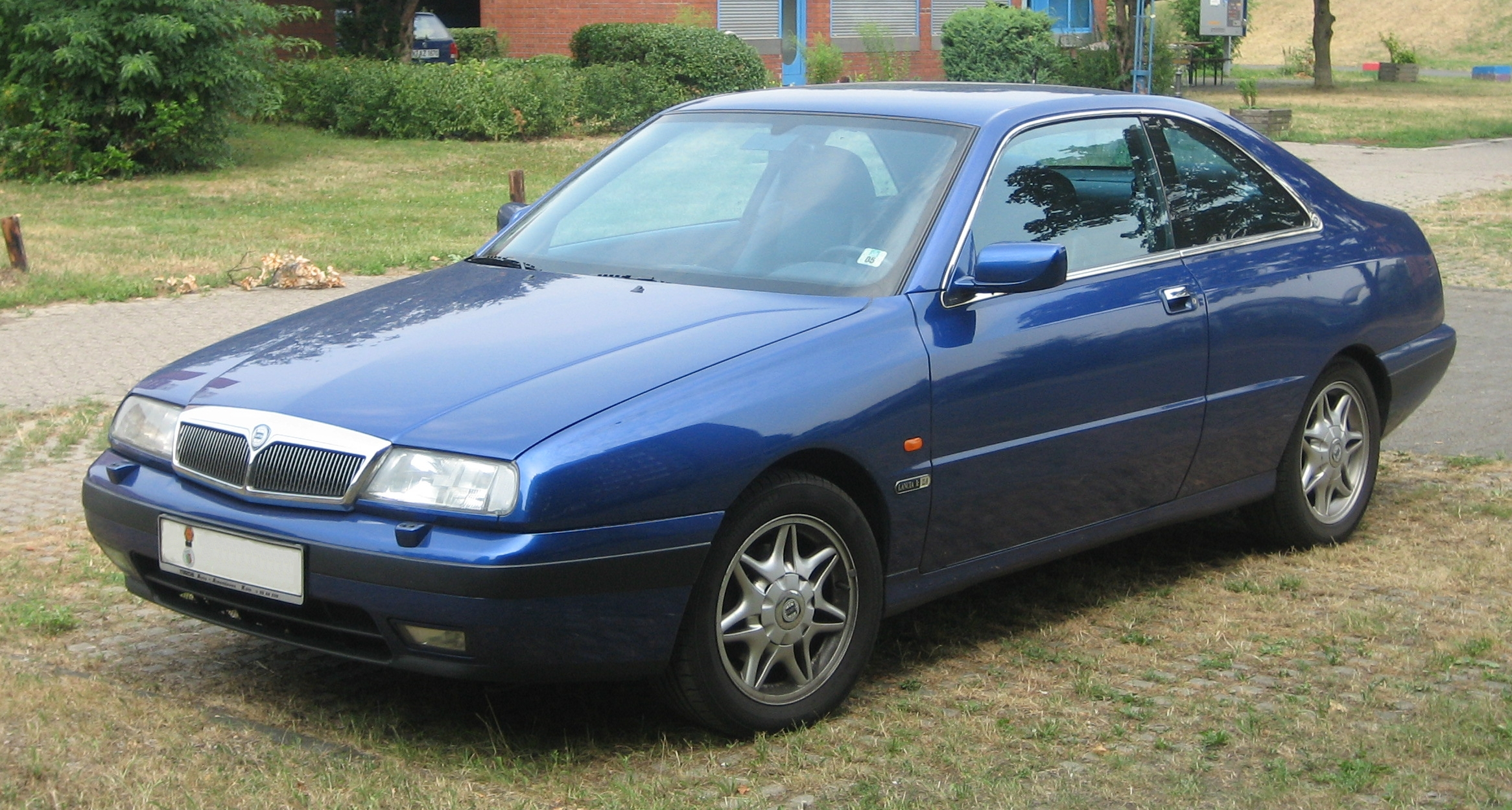
Lancia Kappa Coupé front view

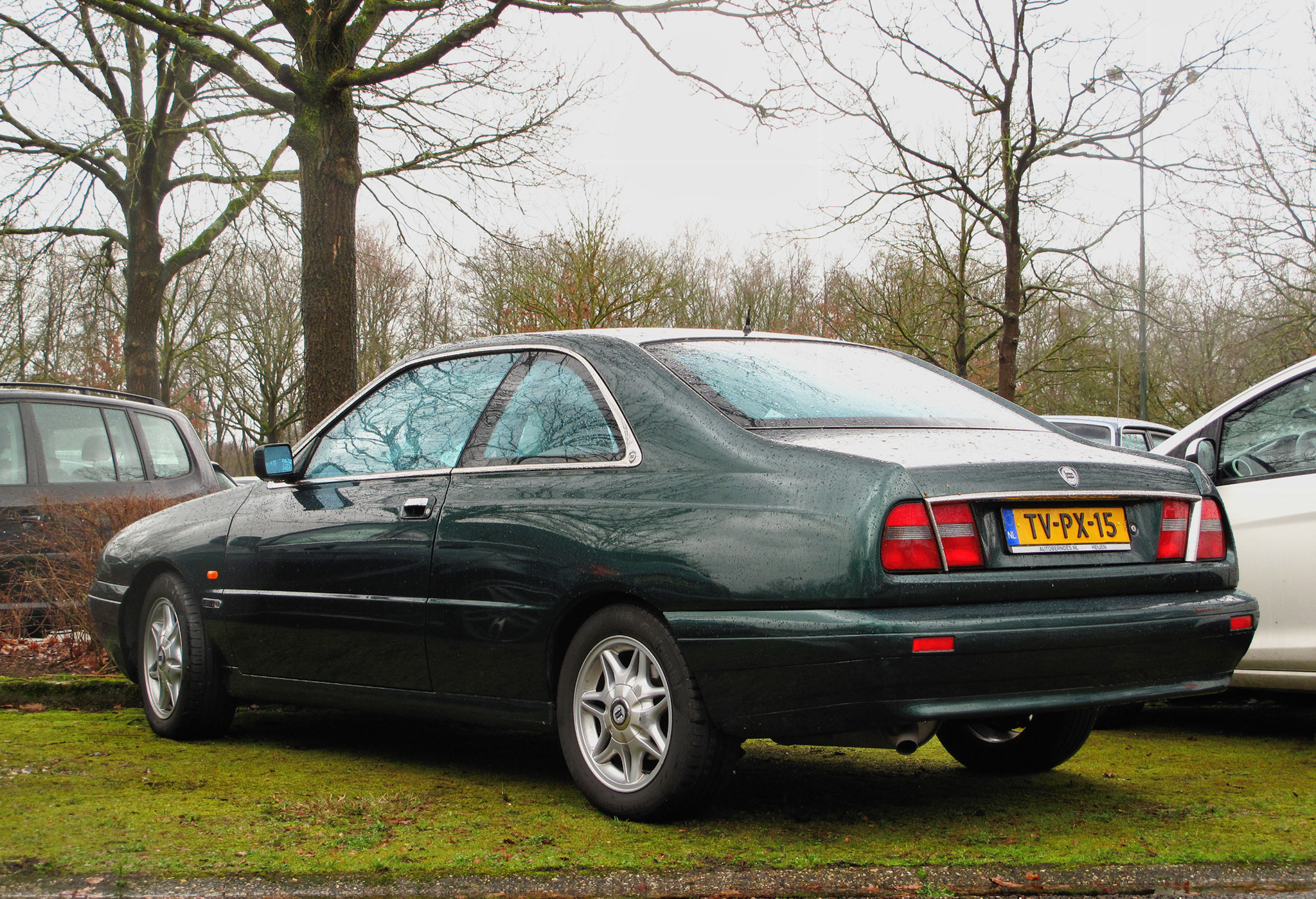
Lancia Kappa Coupé rear view

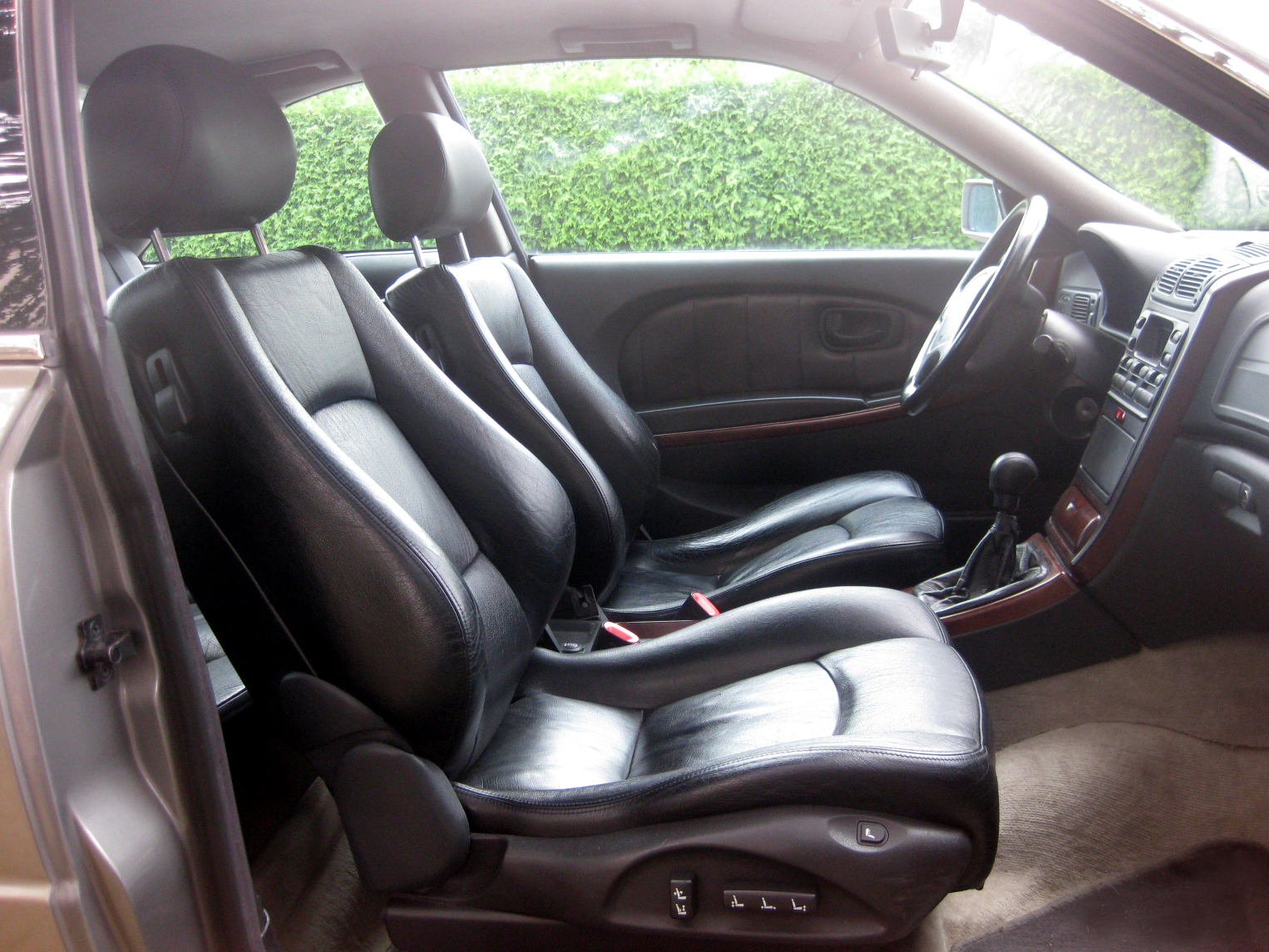
Lancia Kappa Coupé interior

The station wagon version of the Kappa, designated "SW" by Lancia, was designed and built by Pininfarina and did not differ from the saloon's exterior dimensions, sharing most of its body panels. Only 9,208 cars were built in Pininfarina's factory. The estate version was also available with Boge-Nivomat self-levelling hydropneumatic rear suspension.

The Coupé was designed by Centro Stile Lancia and built by Maggiora. It is technically quite different from the saloon, having a 120 mm (4.7 in) shorter wheelbase, wider rear track and a distinctive profile with frameless doors. The front, from bumper to the window screen, was identical to the other Kappa body styles. It was Lancia's first coupé since 1984, when the Beta and Gamma coupés were discontinued and remains the last Lancia to feature this body style to this day. The small production capacities at the Maggiora factory for this essentially hand-made car, and the relatively high price, destined it to be a rare vehicle. For cost cutting reasons, the rear lights were shared with the Delta. 3,263 were manufactured from 1996 to 2000.

Car magazine described the Coupé as looking "top heavy, like a Bentley Continental that's been heated up and squeezed at both ends." However, the car's engine range was praised for matching the vehicle's dynamics, the 2.4-litre five cylinder and the 3.0-litre Alfa Romeo-derived V6 coming closest to "infusing the k Coupe with the classy character its styling tries to suggest." "It's the spiky turbo four that asks the hardest questions of the chassis and the all-strut suspension doesn't flounder. It shines. A viscous coupling helps the front wheels cope with the onslaught of the engine's old school, big-bang turbo delivery, and it feels remarkably untroubled." About the refinement and ride, John Barker (of Car Magazine) reported that the occupants "are completely isolated from any vibration while the ride is smooth at moderate speeds, parrying bumps quietly and unobtrusively." The interior was described as "appealing" and having "curvy, attractive door casings, plump supportive Recaro seats and a good choice of plastics.". The 1997 price was estimated at 24,000 pounds sterling.

== Engines ==
The Kappa has a Transverse engine layout, all powering only the front wheels. The engines were available with either a five-speed manual or four-speed automatic transmission, unless otherwise indicated.

=== 2.0 20V ===
- 1998 cc, straight-5, DOHC, 4 valves per cylinder, 146 hp (107 kW) at 6,100 rpm and 185 N⋅m (136 lb⋅ft) of torque at 4,500 rpm
- 1998 cc, straight-5, DOHC, 4 valves per cylinder, 155 hp (114 kW) at 6,500 rpm and 186 N⋅m (137 lb⋅ft) of torque at 4,000 rpm
- uprated to 155 hp in 1996, due to the addition of a variable geometry inlet manifold, called the Variable Intake System (V.I.S) by Lancia.
- modified again in 1999.
- there were two versions of the manual transmission available for this engine, called Power Drive and Comfort Drive, with gear ratios optimized towards the former or the latter, respectively. Optional 4-speed automatic AISIN AW 596 could be chosen, later replaced by AW 30510.
- this engine was not available in the Coupé

=== 2.4 20V ===
- 2446 cc, straight-5, DOHC, 4 valves per cylinder, 175 hp (129 kW) at 6,100 rpm and 230 N⋅m (170 lb⋅ft) of torque at 3,750 rpm
- fitted with V.I.S
- from 1998 available with a 4-speed AISIN AW 30510 automatic transmission.
- slightly modified in 1999

=== 3.0 V6 24V ===
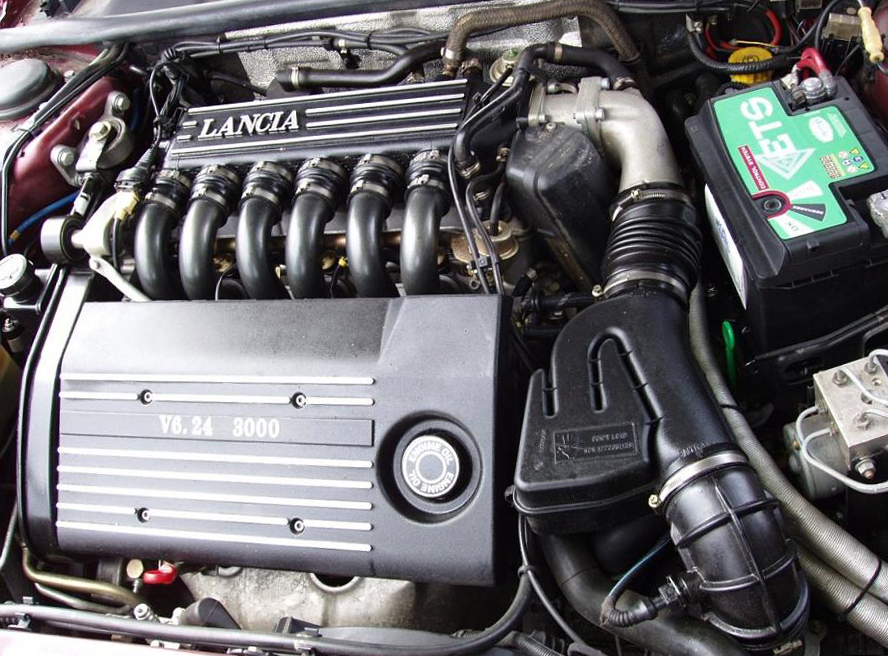
The 3.0-litre 24V V6

- 2959 cc, 'Busso' V6, DOHC, 4 valves per cylinder, 204 hp (150 kW) at 6,300 rpm and 270 N⋅m (199 lb⋅ft) of torque at 4,500 rpm
- not fitted with V.I.S
- slightly modified in 1999
- Available with 5-speed manual transmission or 4-speed Z.F. 4HP-18EH automatic or from 1998 with Z.F. 4HP20. The latter marketed as a sequential, adaptive automatic transmission called 'Comfortronic', with manual operation.

=== 2.0 16V Turbo ===
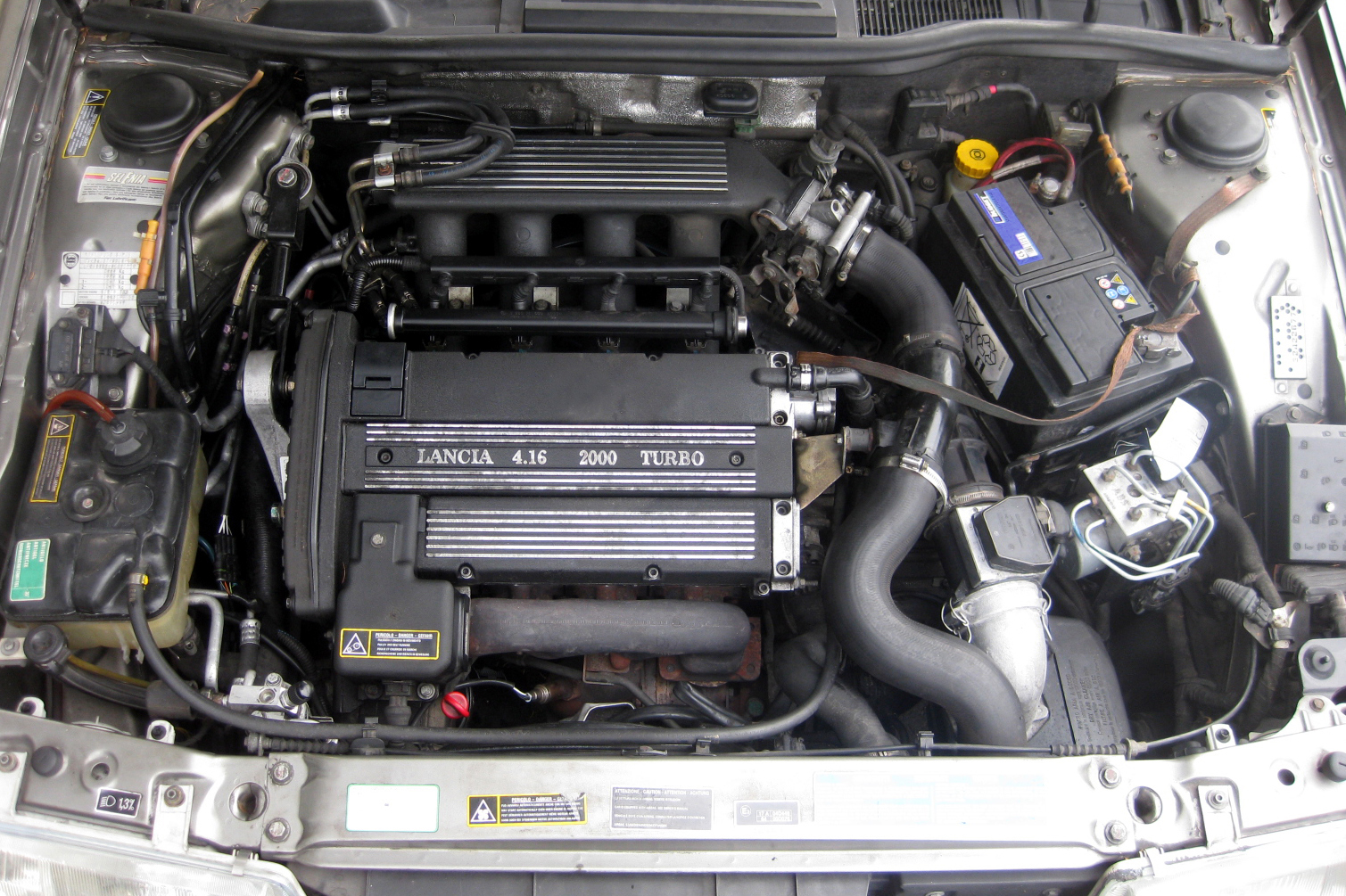
The 2.0-litre turbocharged 16V 4-cylinder engine

- 1995 cc, turbocharged straight-4, DOHC, 4 valves per cylinder, 205 hp (151 kW) at 5,600 rpm and 298 N⋅m (220 lb⋅ft) of torque at 2,750 rpm
- replaced by the turbocharged 5-cylinder in 1998
- 5-speed manual transmission only

=== 2.0 20V Turbo ===
- 1998 cc, turbocharged straight-5, DOHC, 4 valves per cylinder, 220 hp (162 kW) at 6,000 rpm and 315 N⋅m (232 lb⋅ft) of torque at 2,750 rpm
- superseded the 4-cylinder turbo in 1998
- 5-speed manual transmission only

=== 2.4 TDs/JTD ===
- originally a distributor-pump turbodiesel refitted with common rail in 1998 and thereafter referred to as a JTD engine
- TDs - 2387 cc, turbodiesel straight-5, SOHC, 2 valves per cylinder, 124 hp (91 kW) at 4,250 rpm and 246 N⋅m (181 lb⋅ft) of torque at 2,250 rpm
- JTD - 2387 cc common rail turbodiesel straight-5, SOHC, 2 valves per cylinder, 136 hp (100 kW) at 4,250 rpm and 309 N⋅m (228 lb⋅ft) of torque at 2,000 rpm
- not available with automatic transmission or in the Coupé

Engine	Displacement	Power	Torque	Body	Gearbox	Top speed	0–100 km/h (0–62 mph)	Year
Petrol engines
2.0 20V LE	1,998 cc (121.9 cu in)	146 PS (107 kW; 144 hp) at 6,100 rpm	185 N⋅m (136 lb⋅ft) at 4,500 rpm	Sedan	manual automatic	205 km/h (127 mph) -	9.8 seconds -	1994
2.0 20V	1,998 cc (121.9 cu in)	155 PS (114 kW; 153 hp) at 6,500 rpm	186 N⋅m (137 lb⋅ft) at 4,000 rpm	Sedan	manual automatic	212 km/h (132 mph); 210 km/h (130 mph)	9.2 seconds 12.1 seconds	1996
2.0 20V	1,998 cc (121.9 cu in)	155 PS (114 kW; 153 hp) at 6,500 rpm	186 N⋅m (137 lb⋅ft) at 4,000 rpm	SW	manual	205 km/h (127 mph)	10.0 seconds	1996
2.4 20V	2,446 cc (149.3 cu in)	175 PS (129 kW; 173 hp) at 6,100 rpm	230 N⋅m (170 lbf⋅ft) at 3,750 rpm	Sedan	manual automatic	218 km/h (135 mph); 215 km/h (134 mph)	8.7 seconds 10.5 seconds	1994; 1998
2.4 20V	2,446 cc (149.3 cu in)	175 PS (129 kW; 173 hp) at 6,100 rpm	230 N⋅m (170 lbf⋅ft) at 3,750 rpm	SW	manual automatic	212 km/h (132 mph); 210 km/h (130 mph)	8.9 seconds 10.7 seconds	1996; 1998
2.4 20V	2,446 cc (149.3 cu in)	175 PS (129 kW; 173 hp) at 6,100 rpm	230 N⋅m (170 lbf⋅ft) at 3,750 rpm	Coupé	manual	218 km/h (135 mph)	8.7 seconds	1996
3.0 V6 24V	2,959 cc (180.6 cu in)	204 PS (150 kW; 201 hp) at 6,300 rpm	270 N⋅m (199 lbf⋅ft) at 4,500 rpm	Sedan	manual automatic comfortronic	225 km/h (140 mph); 220 km/h (137 mph); 220 km/h (137 mph)	8.0 seconds 9.8 seconds -	1994; 1994; 1998
3.0 V6 24V	2,959 cc (180.6 cu in)	204 PS (150 kW; 201 hp) at 6,300 rpm	270 N⋅m (199 lbf⋅ft) at 4,500 rpm	SW	automatic comfortronic	218 km/h (135 mph); 218 km/h (135 mph)	9.9 seconds -	1996; 1998
3.0 V6 24V	2,959 cc (180.6 cu in)	204 PS (150 kW; 201 hp) at 6,300 rpm	270 N⋅m (199 lbf⋅ft) at 4,500 rpm	Coupé	automatic comfortronic	225 km/h (140 mph); 220 km/h (137 mph)	9.8 seconds 8.9 seconds	1996; 1998
2.0 16V turbo	1,995 cc (121.7 cu in)	205 PS (151 kW; 202 hp) at 5,600 rpm	298 N⋅m (220 lb⋅ft) at 2,750 rpm	Sedan	manual	235 km/h (146 mph)	7.3 seconds	1994
2.0 16V turbo	1,995 cc (121.7 cu in)	205 PS (151 kW; 202 hp) at 5,600 rpm	298 N⋅m (220 lb⋅ft) at 2,750 rpm	SW	manual	230 km/h (143 mph)	8.3 seconds	1996
2.0 16V turbo	1,995 cc (121.7 cu in)	205 PS (151 kW; 202 hp) at 5,600 rpm	298 N⋅m (220 lb⋅ft) at 2,750 rpm	Coupé	manual	235 km/h (146 mph)	7.3 seconds	1996
2.0 20V turbo	1,998 cc (121.9 cu in)	220 PS (162 kW; 217 hp) at 5,750 rpm	315 N⋅m (232 lb⋅ft) at 2,750 rpm	Sedan	manual	243 km/h (151 mph)	7.3 seconds	1998
2.0 20V turbo	1,998 cc (121.9 cu in)	220 PS (162 kW; 217 hp) at 5,750 rpm	315 N⋅m (232 lb⋅ft) at 2,750 rpm	SW	manual	235 km/h (146 mph)	7.9 seconds	1998
2.0 20V turbo	1,998 cc (121.9 cu in)	220 PS (162 kW; 217 hp) at 5,750 rpm	315 N⋅m (232 lb⋅ft) at 2,750 rpm	Coupé	manual	243 km/h (151 mph)	7.3 seconds	1998
Diesel engines
2.4 10V td	2,387 cc (145.7 cu in)	124 PS (91 kW; 122 hp) at 4,000 rpm	265 N⋅m (195 lb⋅ft) at 2,000 rpm	Sedan	manual	193 km/h (120 mph)	12.6 seconds	1994
2.4 10V td	2,387 cc (145.7 cu in)	124 PS (91 kW; 122 hp) at 4,000 rpm	265 N⋅m (195 lb⋅ft) at 2,000 rpm	SW	manual	190 km/h (118 mph)	11.5 seconds	1996
2.4 10V JTD	2,387 cc (145.7 cu in)	136 PS (100 kW; 134 hp) at 4,250 rpm	309 N⋅m (228 lb⋅ft) at 2,000 rpm	Sedan	manual	202 km/h (126 mph)	10.0 seconds	1998
2.4 10V JTD	2,387 cc (145.7 cu in)	136 PS (100 kW; 134 hp) at 4,250 rpm	309 N⋅m (228 lb⋅ft) at 2,000 rpm	SW	manual	200 km/h (124 mph)	10.8 seconds	1998

manual is 5-speed, automatic/comfortronic is 4-speed

== Concept cars and specials ==
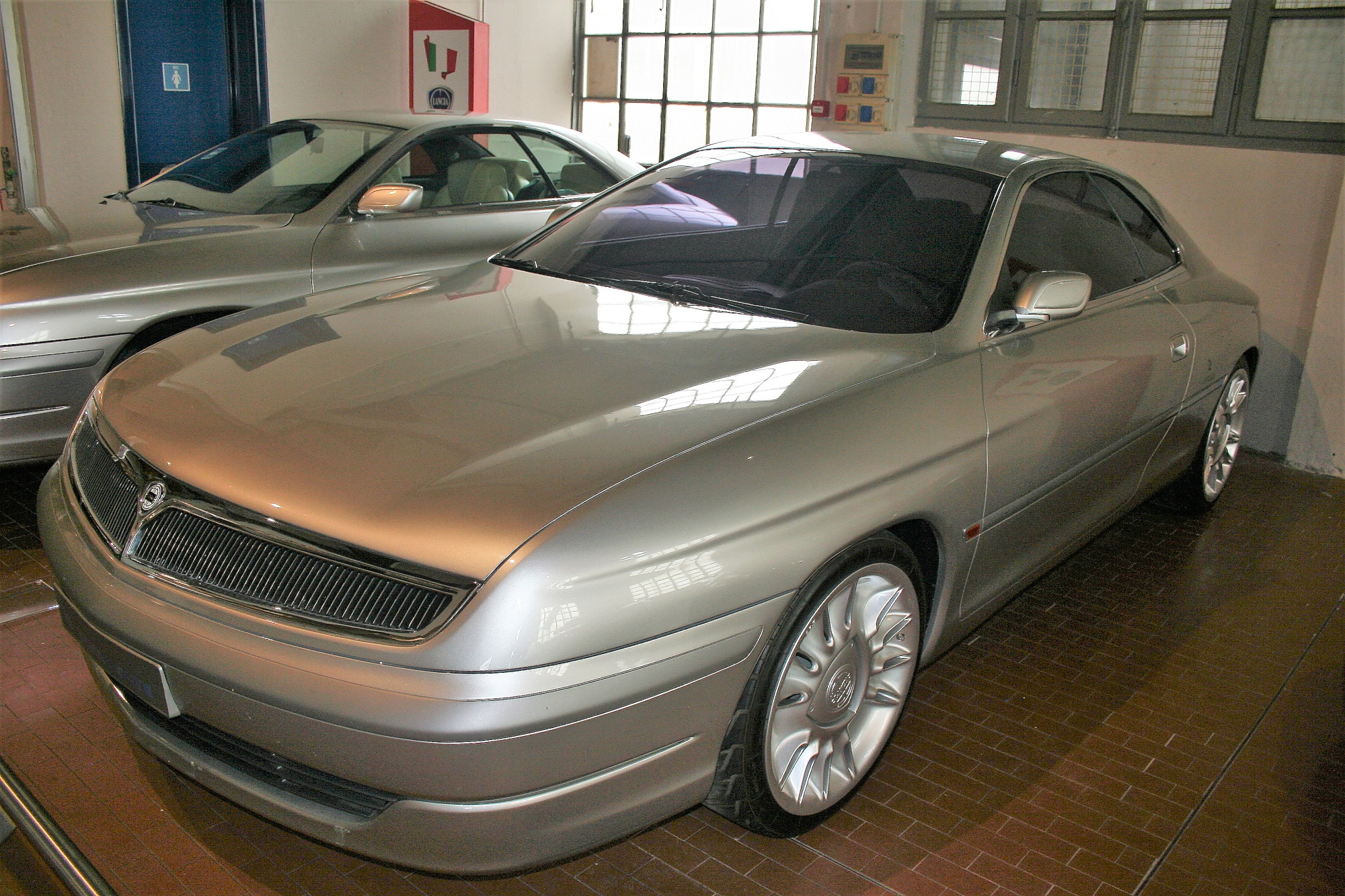
Lancia Kayak

=== Lancia Kayak ===
The Lancia Kayak or Bertone Kayak, is a 4-seater coupé concept car built by Italian coachbuilder Bertone, based on the Lancia Kappa mechanicals, and unveiled at the 1995 Geneva Motor Show. It was designed by Luciano D'Ambrosio.

=== Kappa Limousine ===
A one-off Kappa Limousine, with an extended middle section and wheelbase, was built for Gianni Agnelli. Its concept was very similar to the Thema Limousine from 1987. The car was finished in dark blue with a matte-black roof.

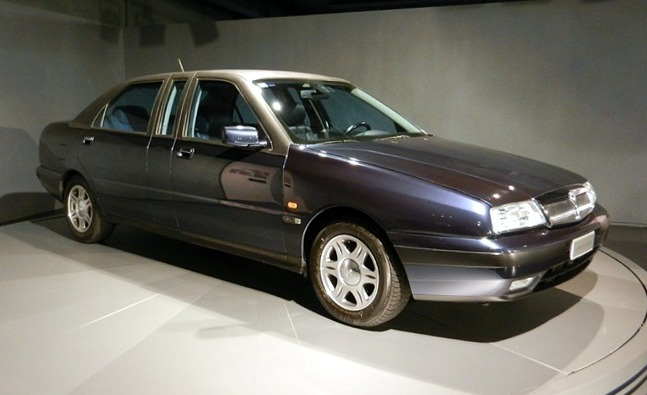
Lancia Kappa Limousine
