= Organization of Pakistani Entrepreneurs of North America =

- Abbreviation: OPEN
- Formation: March 22, 1998; 28 years ago
- Founders: Imran Khan, Tahir H. Chaudhry, and Iftikhar (Ifti) Ahmad
- Founded at: Boston
- Type: Nonprofit organization
- Purpose: Promotion of entrepreneurship and professional growth within the Pakistani community in America
- Location: United States
- Region served: United States, Pakistan, Canada, United Kingdom
- Members: 350 charter members, 2,000 General members and 50,000 on its mailing list (2025)
- Global President: Tariq Khan
- Subsidiaries: Chapters in Atlanta, Austin, Boston, Chicago, Carolinas, Dallas, Houston, Islamabad, Karachi, Lahore, London, Seattle, Silicon Valley, Toronto, New York, and Washington D.C.
- Funding: Membership fees, event fees
- Website: www.openglobal.org

The Organization of Pakistani Entrepreneurs of North America (OPEN) is a not-for-profit organization, whose sole focus is the promotion of entrepreneurship and professional growth within the Pakistani community. OPEN is a secular and non-political organization.

As of 2024, OPEN had 17 chapters and over 350 charter members, 2,000 general members and over 50,000 on its mailing list. The chapters and members continue to grow. The organization consists of corporate professionals, entrepreneurs, venture capitalists, banking professionals, social leaders and academics.

== History ==
OPEN was formed on March 22, 1998, in Boston by a group of Pakistani American entrepreneurs and corporate executives. The purpose of the organization is to create a platform to help promote entrepreneurship and assist professionals in their careers and to mentor them to achieve their aspirations. Imran Qidwai and Imran Khan came up with the idea, Tahir Chaudhry coined the organization's name. Feisal A Ahmad, Iftikhar's son designed the logo. The founding team consisted of Imran H Khan as President, Tahir H Chaudhry as Secretary, Iftikhar A Ahmad as Treasurer, Board Members were Hassan Ahmed, Salman Akhtar, M. Salahuddin Khan and Imran Qidwai.

OPEN was registered in the Commonwealth of Massachusetts on May 5, 2000 (more on http://open-boston.org/history/). Additional cities/areas joined; New York, Silicon Valley and Washington, D.C. The founding team in consultation with its legal counsel came up with the plan to create a governing body that would ensure a streamlined growth of OPEN and its mission. This organization was initially called "OPEN National" and was US centric. Soon after it was decided not to limit it to US but expand the reach globally thus Open National was renamed as "OPEN Global" and its charter was defined.

The first OPEN location was converted to the first chapter Boston, MA with New York, Silicon Valley, Washington, D.C., Houston, Dallas following.

Karachi was the first OPEN chapter outside US which was launched in the later half of 2011. OPEN launched its chapter in Lahore, Pakistan in 2013.

By 2018, OPEN had 17 chapters with over 350 charter members, 2,000 general members and over 50,000 on its mailing list. The chapters and members continue to grow. The organization consists of corporate professionals, entrepreneurs, venture capitalists, banking professionals, social leaders and academics.

Globally, at the end of 2020 OPEN had 14 chapters Atlanta, Boston/New England, Chicago, Houston, Austin, Islamabad, Karachi, Lahore, London, New York, Seattle, Silicon Valley, Southern California, Toronto and Washington DC.

Austin chapter was added in 2022.

== Goals ==
The purpose of the organization is to create a platform to help promote entrepreneurship and to assist professionals in their careers and mentor them to achieve their aspirations. This includes:

- Promoting and provide growth opportunities for Pakistani's, Americans and Pakistani's/other nationals at other geographies within the diaspora through regular mentoring and networking.
- Providing financing assistance and mentorship to enterprising individuals through programs such as the business plan competition and monthly business plan critiques.
- Developing ongoing events through which local professionals can meet and network amongst themselves and with other influential individuals.
- Recognizing accomplishments of Pakistani American and other entrepreneurs and professionals.
- Promoting contacts and creating bridges between entrepreneurs in the US; entrepreneurs and professionals in Pakistan and other geographies

== Chapters ==
An OPEN chapters has at its core a Charter membership comprising Pakistanis in the areas of finance, technology, telecommunications, biotech and consulting in North America. OPEN regularly organizes events pertaining to current issues in business and entrepreneurship. In addition to OPEN's Charter Members, OPEN includes executive committees of seasoned entrepreneurs and professionals from a multitude of industries and professions that help plan, coordinate, and execute OPEN's mission. Each chapter's charter members and executive committee members are joined by General Members who are dues-paying members of OPEN that participate in and contribute to OPEN's events and services.

== Annual Forum ==
Since its establishment in 1998 has had a number of distinguished speakers at its annual forums. Since 2004, OPEN Annual Forum, hosted by Silicon Valley has had speakers including former Pakistani President Pervez Musharraf, Political Figure, Cricket World Cup winner and former Prime Minister Imran Khan, venture capitalist from California, Mike Moritz and former Governor of Vermont, Howard Dean.

== Actions ==
- In 2012, OPEN raised and collected nearly $50 for flood victims in Pakistan.
