= Kazakh presidential inauguration =

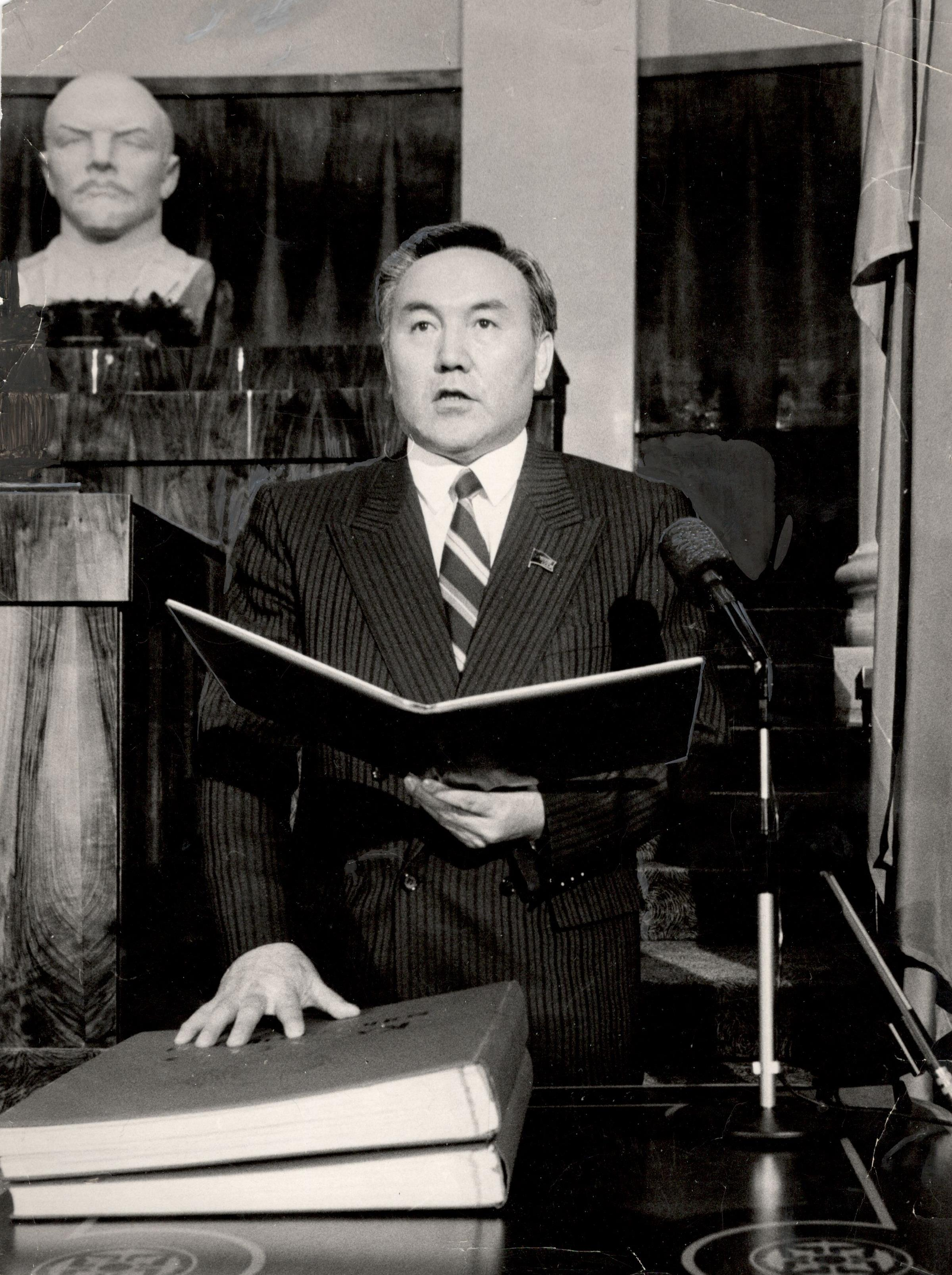
Former President Nursultan Nazarbayev being sworn in to the post of President of the Kazakh SSR, December 1991.

The inauguration of the president of Kazakhstan is a ceremony that takes place to mark the start of a new term for the president of the Republic of Kazakhstan.

== Oath of office ==
During the inaugural ceremony the president-elect puts his/her right hand on the Constitution of Kazakhstan to which he recites the oath of office:

I solemnly swear that I will faithfully serve the people of Kazakhstan, strictly observe the Constitution and laws of the Republic of Kazakhstan, guarantee the rights and freedoms of citizens, conscientiously perform the high duties of the President of the Republic of Kazakhstan entrusted to me

After his/her assumption to officer, the chairman of the Central Election Commission then hands the presidential certificate to the new president.

== List of inaugural ceremonies ==
Date	Event	President	Location^{Place}	Document sworn on	Notes
December 10, 1991	First inauguration of Nursultan Nazarbayev	Nursultan Nazarbayev	Palace of the Republic	Constitution of the Kazakh SSR	
January 21, 1999	Second inauguration of Nursultan Nazarbayev	Nursultan Nazarbayev	Congress Hall	Constitution of Kazakhstan	
January 11, 2006	Third inauguration of Nursultan Nazarbayev	Nursultan Nazarbayev	Aqorda Presidential Palace	Constitution of Kazakhstan	
April 8, 2011	Fourth inaugrutation of Nursultan Nazarbayev	Nursultan Nazarbayev	Independence Palace	Constitution of Kazakhstan	
April 29, 2015	Fifth inauguration of Nursultan Nazarbayev	Nursultan Nazarbayev	Independence Palace	Constitution of Kazakhstan	
June 12, 2019	First inauguration of Kassym-Jomart Tokayev	Kassym-Jomart Tokayev	Independence Palace	Constitution of Kazakhstan	
November 26, 2022	Second inauguration of Kassym-Jomart Tokayev	Kassym-Jomart Tokayev	Independence Palace	Constitution of Kazakhstan	
