= Palace of Independence (Astana) =

Palace for official and public events in Astana, Kazakhstan

Independence Palace
- Тәуелсіздік Сарайы; Täuelsızdık Saraiy
- Independence Palace
- Interactive map of the Independence Palace area

General information
- Location: Astana, Kazakhstan
- Coordinates: 51.1207°N 71.4720°E
- Construction started: December 2007
- Completed: October 2008

Technical details
- Floor area: 40,000 square meters

Design and construction
- Architect: Gyultekin Linea

Website
- http://indepalace.kz/

The Independence Palace (Kazakh: Тәуелсіздік Сарайы, Täuelsızdık Saraiy, [tʰæwʲelsɘzˈdɘk sɑrɑˈjɯ]), also known as the Palace of Independence, is a palace in Astana, Kazakhstan. It is used for official state functions, including forums, meetings and conventions. On December 15, 2008, the palace was officially opened to the public. Although construction continued until half a year later.

The outside of the palace is made out of blue glass with a lattice of white pipes. The building is shaped into a trapezoid. The halls of the palace include a gallery of applied art, the Museum of City History of Astana, and a four-dimensional cinema.

== Events ==
=== Summits ===
The Congress Hall has witnessed many historic events. In 2010, an OSCE Summit was held in the Palace of Independence. The meeting of the Supreme Eurasian Economic Council, as well as anniversary summits of SCO and OIC, have taken place in the palace. The most significant event in the history of the palace was a 2019 meeting of speakers of the parliaments of the Eurasian countries.

=== Domestic events ===
The inauguration ceremony of President Nursultan Nazarbayev (2011 and 2015) and President Kassym-Jomart Tokayev (2019 and 2022) took place at the palace. Nur Otan party congresses are held annually.
