= Opening =

Opening may refer to:

== Types of openings ==
- Hole
- A title sequence or opening credits
- Opening theme
- Grand opening of a business or other institution
- Inauguration
- Keynote
- Opening sentence
- Opening sequence
- Opening statement, a beginning statement in a court case
- Opening (morphology), a morphological filtering operation used in image processing
- Overture
- Salutation (greeting)
- Vernissage

=== Games ===
- Backgammon opening
- Chess opening
- Go opening
- Shogi opening
- Opening bid, a term from contract bridge
- Opening lead, a term from contract bridge

== Media ==
- Al-Fatiha, "The Opening", the first chapter of the Qur'an
- The Opening (album), live album by Mal Waldron
- "Opening", a song by Hikaru Utada from the 2004 album Exodus
- "Opening", a song by Jay Chou from the 2007 album Secret
- "Opening", a song by Ed Sheeran from the 2025 album Play
