= Polish presidential inauguration =

Ceremony marking the beginning of a new Presidency of Poland

Polish Presidential Inauguration refers to the ceremonial proceedings that mark the commencement of a new term for the President of the Republic of Poland. In accordance with Article 130 of the Constitution of the Republic of Poland, the sole constitutional requirement for assuming the office is the taking of the presidential oath before the National Assembly. All additional components of the inauguration are of a ceremonial nature.

== Before Inauguration Day ==
The first official ceremony following a presidential election victory in Poland is the formal presentation of the certificate of election by the Chairman of the National Electoral Commission to the President-elect. This document officially confirms the candidate’s election to the office of President of the Republic of Poland. In accordance with legal and constitutional requirements, if the President-elect holds any other public office at the time, they are obliged to resign from that position on the same day the certificate is presented. To underscore the dignity and symbolic importance of the presidential office, the ceremony is typically held in a location reflecting the solemnity of the Republic—most commonly the Royal Castle in Warsaw or the Wilanów Royal Palace.

According to Polish electoral law, the President-elect is to be inaugurated on the day the outgoing President’s term expires. In cases where the office was vacated prior to the election, the inauguration must take place within seven days following the Supreme Court's confirmation of the validity of the election results.

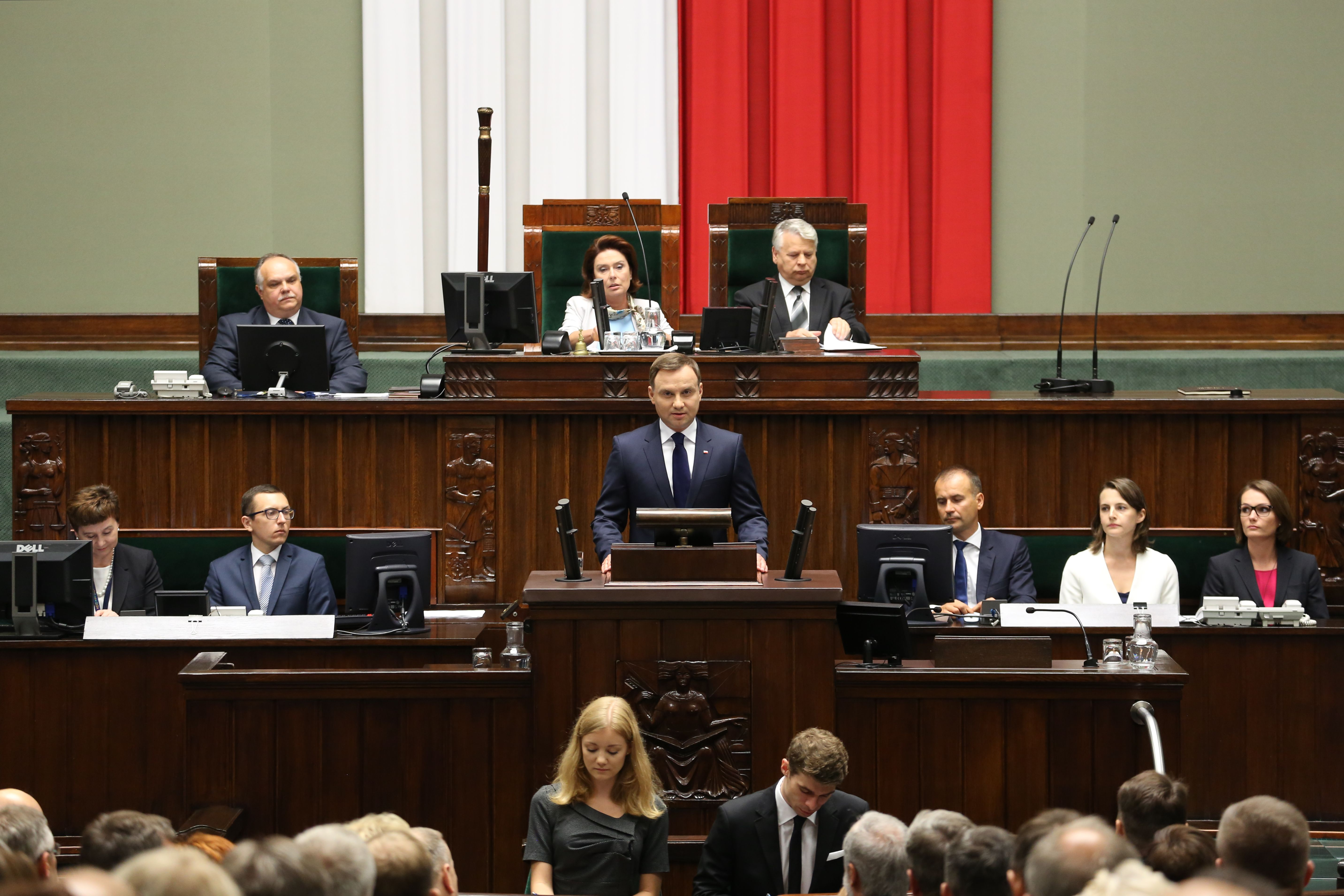
Andrzej Duda delivering his inaugural address

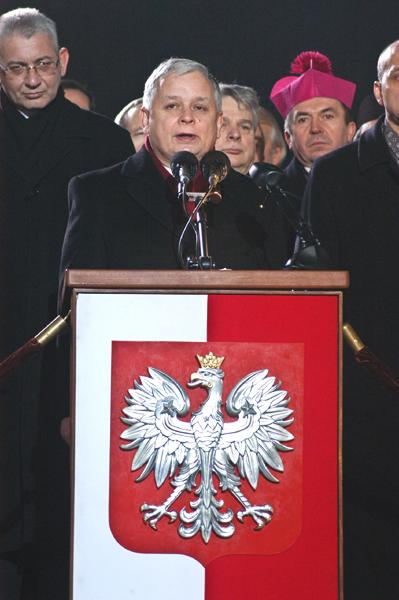
Lech Kaczyński taking over as commander-in-chief of the Armed Forces

== Inauguration Day ==
=== Parliamentary Ceremony ===
President-elect arrives at the National Assembly, accompanied by the First Lady. The Ceremony is presided by the Marshal of the Sejm or in case of absence, by the Marshal of the Senate. The inauguration begins by opening of the session by the presiding officer and singing of the national anthem of Poland.

As of 2017, the current procedure of the oath is stipulated in the resolution of the National Assembly from December 6, 2000 titled "Regulamin Zgromadzenia Narodowego zwołanego w celu złożenia przysięgi przez nowo wybranego Prezydenta Rzeczypospolitej Polskiej" (M.P. Nr 40, poz. 774).

The president then repeats the following the oath of office after the presiding officer:

Accepting the office of the president of Republic of Poland at the Nation's will, I solemnly swear, that I will keep up my devotion to the provisions of constitution, I will firmly guard the dignity of the Nation, sovereignty and security of the country. I swear, that the good of the Fatherland and wellbeing of the Citizens will be my first precept.

All presidents except Aleksander Kwaśniewski finished the oath with optional So help me God.

The outgoing presidential couple, and other guests invited by president-elect, watch the ceremony from the balcony. Wojciech Jaruzelski was not invited to Lech Wałęsa's inauguration.

== Further ceremonies and the handover ==
After taking the oath of office, the president delivers his inaugural address and leaves for the Royal Castle, Warsaw to receive the Grand Cross of the Order of Polonia Restituta and the Order of the White Eagle. (Andrzej Duda attended a service at St. John's Cathedral before going to the Castle.) After receiving presidential insignia, president arrives at the Presidential Palace where incoming and outgoing presidential couples bid farewell to each other. The president then arrives at Piłsudski Square for a military ceremony confirming his assumption of the office of commander-in-chief of the Polish Armed Forces. If the president is reelected, only the parliamentary ceremony takes place.

== Dates ==
- December 11, 1922: Inauguration of Gabriel Narutowicz (later assassinated on December 16, 1922, aged 57)
- December 22, 1922: Inauguration of Stanisław Wojciechowski
- June 4, 1926: Inauguration of Ignacy Mościcki (later exiled after the German invasion of Poland on September 30, 1939)
- November 20, 1952: Presidential Office abolished, replaced by the President of the Council of State)
- December 31, 1989: Presidential title reinstated, Inauguration of General Wojciech Jaruzelski

- December 22, 1990: Inauguration of Lech Wałęsa
- December 23, 1995: First inauguration of Aleksander Kwaśniewski
- December 22 or 23, 2000: Second inauguration of Aleksander Kwaśniewski
- December 23, 2005: Inauguration of Lech Kaczyński (died in a plane crash on April 10, 2010)
- April 10, 2010: Swearing in of Bronisław Komorowski as acting President
- July 8, 2010: July 2010 Polish swearing in of Acting Presidents
- August 6, 2010: Inauguration of Bronisław Komorowski
- August 6, 2015: First inauguration of Andrzej Duda
- August 6, 2020: Second inauguration of Andrzej Duda
- August 6, 2025: Inauguration of Karol Nawrocki
- During 1939-1990 the office of President-in-Exile was performed by the wartime deputies assigned according to Article 24 of the April Constitution of Poland (1935)
