= Lancia Gamma (1910) =

Lancia 20 HP
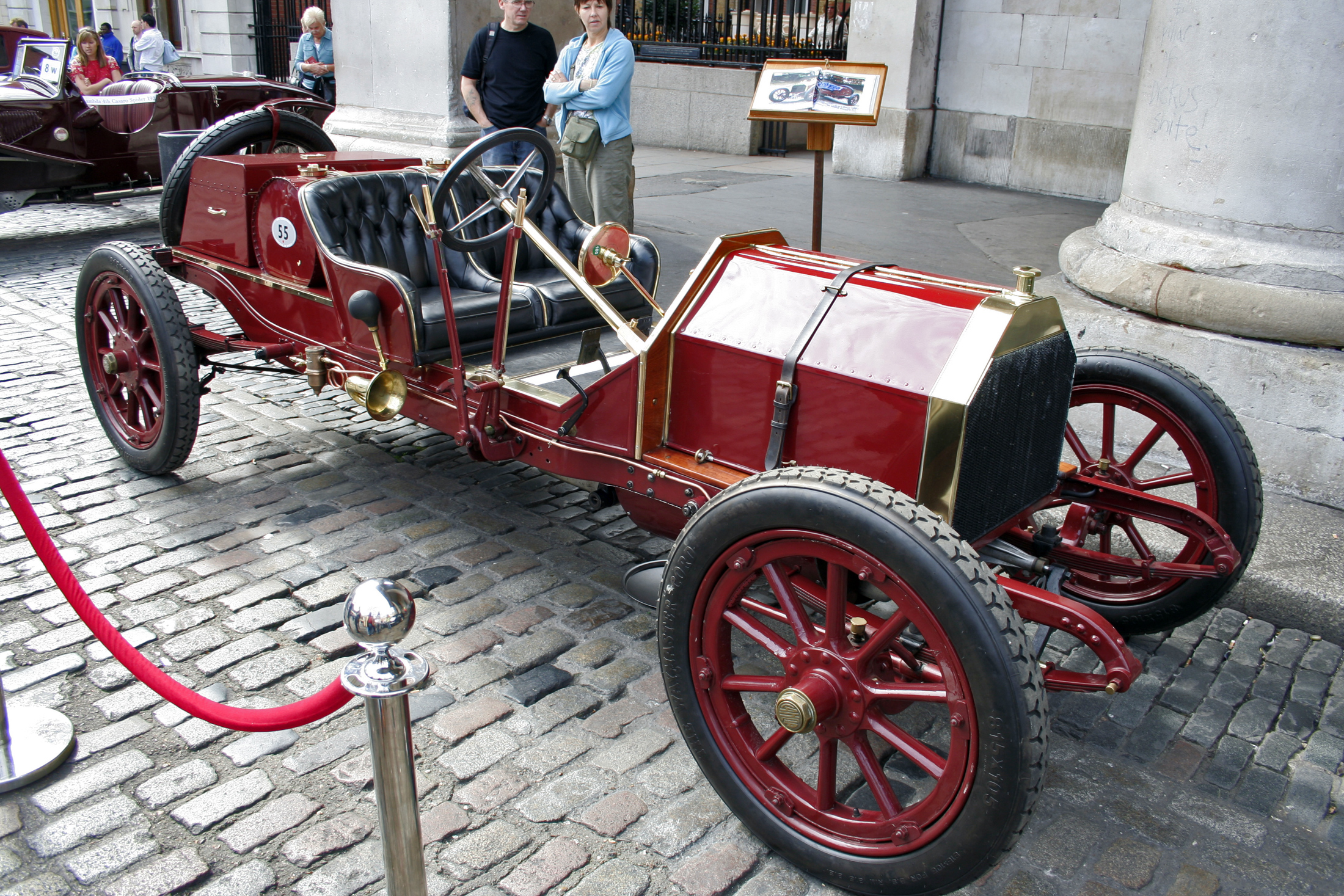
- Lancia 20 HP Corsa

Overview
- Manufacturer: Lancia
- Also called: Lancia Gamma
- Production: 1910
- Assembly: Turin, Italy

Body and chassis
- Layout: Front-engine, rear-wheel-drive

Powertrain
- Engine: 3,460 cc Tipo 55 I4 (petrol)
- Transmission: 4-speed manual

Dimensions
- Wheelbase: 2,740, 2,932 mm (107.9, 115.4 in)
- Width: 1,615 mm (63.6 in)
- Kerb weight: 820–850 kg (1,808–1,874 lb) (chassis)

Chronology
- Predecessor: Lancia 15-20 HP Beta
- Successor: Lancia 20-30 HP Delta

The Lancia 20 HP (Tipo 55), later renamed Lancia Gamma, (Note: All early Lancia models were named after their tax horsepower rating, as was common practice; when in 1919 Lancia began naming its passenger cars with Greek alphabet letters, all earlier models were posthumously renamed in order of appearance—from the 1907 Alfa to the 1913 Theta.) is a passenger car produced by the Italian car manufacturer Lancia during 1910. It was derived from a previous Beta model, now equipped with a bigger engine. In total, 258 units were built. In 1911, the type was superseded by the larger-engined and more powerful Lancia 20-30 HP Delta.

The Delta was built with two wheelbases, normal and short. The latter was destined for competition-oriented Corsa models, to be bodied as open two- or three-seaters.

== Specifications ==
The engine was a Tipo 55 side valve inline-four, with cast-iron monobloc engine. Bore and stroke measured 100 mm × 110 mm (3.9 in × 4.3 in), for a total displacement of 3460 cc. The engine produced 40 hp at 1500 rpm, giving the car a top speed of 110 kilometres per hour (68 mph)—the same as the six-cylinder Dialfa of two years earlier.

The transmission was a 4-speed gearbox with a multi-plate wet clutch. The separate body was built on a conventional ladder frame; fore and aft there were solid axles, on semi-elliptic springs at the front and three-quarter elliptic springs at the rear. Braking was by drums on the transmission and on the rear wheels.

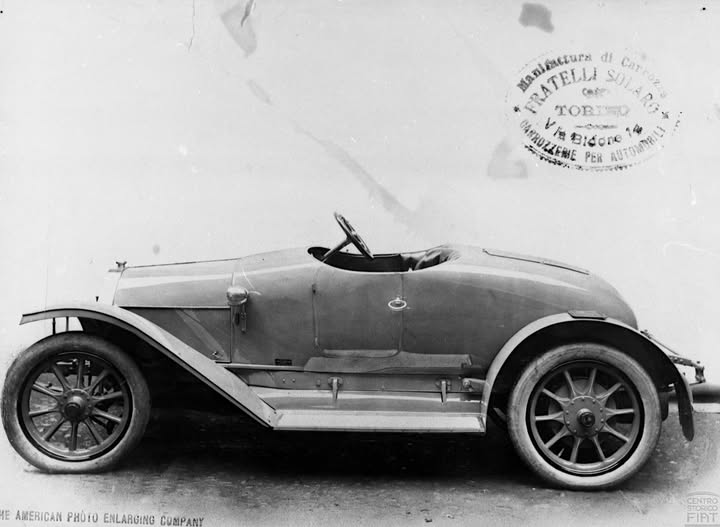
Roadster by Carrozzeria Solaro, Turin

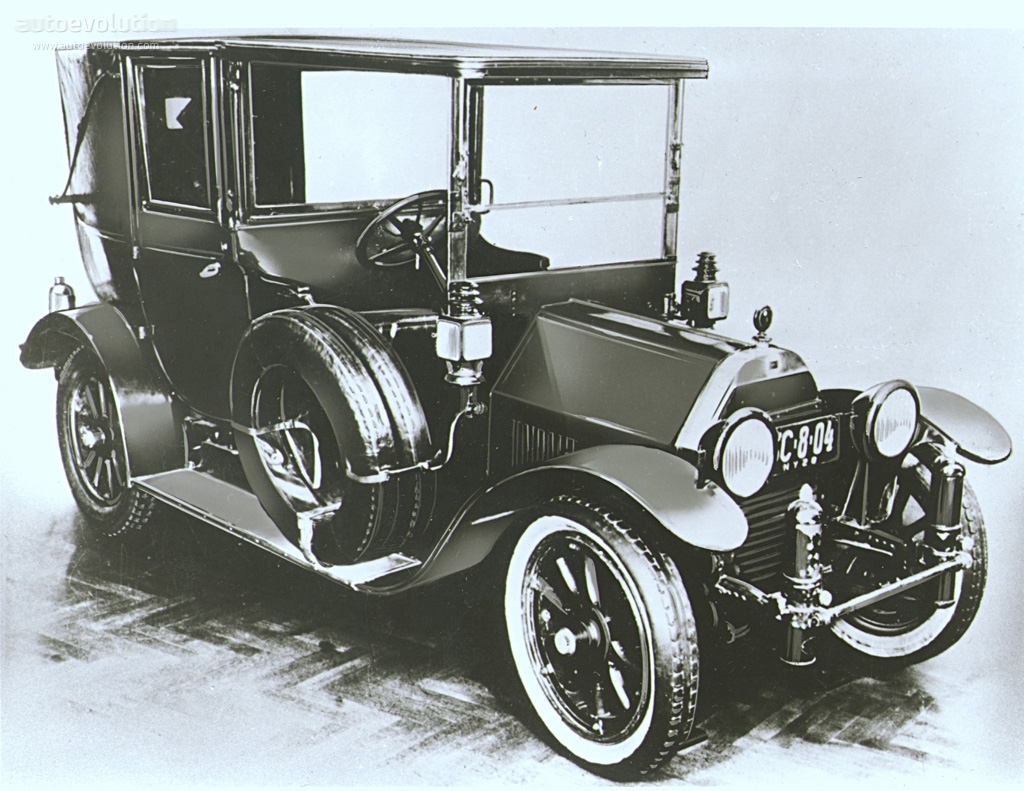
Landaulet

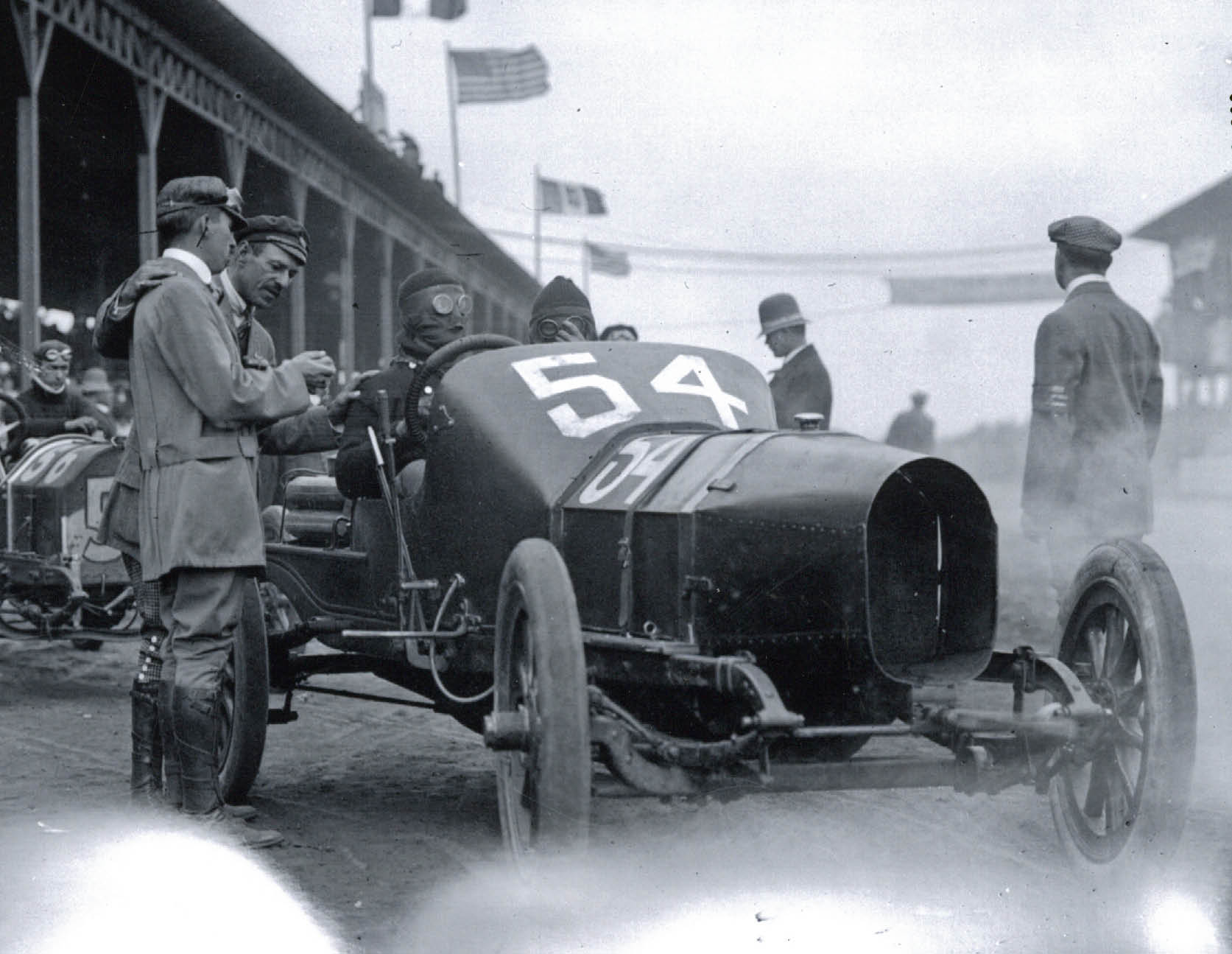
Billy Knipper in Corsa at 1910 Vanderbilt

== Bibliography ==
- Frostick, Michael (1976). Lancia. London: Dalton Watson. ISBN 0-901564-22-2.
- Amatori, Franco; et al. (1992). Storia della Lancia — Impresa Tecnologie Mercati 1906–1969. Milan: Fabbri Editori. p. 349.
