= Lancia 3Ro =

Italian truck

The Lancia Ro, Lancia Ro-Ro and Lancia 3Ro were 4x2 heavy trucks built by Italian manufacturer Lancia from the 1930s through the 1940s for military and civilian use. The 2-cylinder diesel Ro was produced from 1933 to 1939, the 3-cylinder diesel Ro-Ro from 1935 to 1939 and the improved 5-cylinder diesel 3Ro from 1938 to 1947.

Ro and 3Ro saw extensive military service during the Second Italo-Ethiopian War and World War II, chiefly as two of the main heavy trucks of the Royal Italian Army.

== Lancia Ro ==
Lancia Ro
- Type: Military heavy truck
- Place of origin: ITA

Service history
- Used by: Italy, Germany
- Wars: World War II

Production history
- Designed: 1932
- Manufacturer: Lancia
- Produced: 1933–1938
- No. built: 1701 petrol, 3056 diesel

Specifications
- Mass: 5,140 kg (11,332 lb)
- Length: 7,084 mm (278.9 in)
- Width: 2,300 mm (90.6 in)
- Height: 3,000 mm (118.1 in)
- Crew: 1
- Engine: 3 cylinder petrol engine to 4771 cc 2 cylinders diesel engine to 1900 t/mn CH xx CV petrol, 64 CV diesel
- Payload capacity: 6,500 kg (14,330 lb)
- Transmission: 4 forward 1 reverse
- Fuel capacity: 3,180 cc
- Operational range: 300 km (30 litres/100 km) diesel
- Maximum speed: 32 km/h (20 mph) diesel

The Lancia Ro (or 264) was the first of a family of Lancia 4x2 heavy trucks, starting in 1933. The Ro was built with two versions, a three-cylinder gasoline (BM) engine or a two-cylinder diesel (Nm) engine. The Ro was particularly robust truck, considered reliable, requiring little maintenance, and easy to drive. It was the first Italian truck to receive a 4 speed transmission.

=== Models ===
==== Ro NM ====
The Ro NM (for Nafta Militare or "diesel, military") military truck was produced in 3,056 units from 1934 to 1938, and eventually replaced by the improved 3Ro.

Built by Lancia under license from German firm Junkers, the Tipo 89 engine fitted to the Ro was a compact 3,180 cc (194 cu in), four opposed-piston, straight-two cylinder, two-stroke diesel. It developed 64 hp (48 kW) at 1,500 rpm. The transmission used a Tipo 126 4-speed manual transmission with a 2 speed auxiliary, for a total of 8 forward and 2 reverse speeds.

==== Ro ====
From 1933 to 1939 429 civilian Ro trucks were built. This version differed mechanically from the military type mainly for its wider tracks front and rear, as well for the availability of a longer 4,250 mm (167.3 in) wheelbase alongside the normal version.

==== Ro BM ====
From 1934 to 1938 Lancia built 1701 military type Ros fitted with a petrol engine, intended for colonial duty—the Ro BM (364), for Benzina Militare or "petrol, military".

Its Tipo 98 petrol engine was a side valve 5,120 cc (312 cu in) inline-four, developing 65 hp (48 kW) at 1,700 rpm.

==== Ro-Ro ====
The Lancia Ro-Ro (265) was an improved civilian-only, longer wheelbase (4,650 mm or 183.1 in) version of the Ro fitted with a Lancia-developed three cylinder version of the Lancia-Junkers two-cylinder diesel. It was built from 1935 to 1939 in 302 examples.

The Ro-Ro was powered by a Tipo 90 4,770 cc (291 cu in) inline-three cylinders, opposed piston, two-stroke diesel developing 95 hp (71 kW) at 1,500 rpm.

=== Service history ===
From 1934 to 1938 the Royal Italian Army acquired 4,757 Lancia Ros which were equipped with pneumatic tires where it was used to transport artillery and light tanks.

The Royal Italian Army deployed the Lancia Ro for the first time in North Africa in 1935–1936. The 228 Ro's sent there gave full satisfaction to the Italian Army. Ro's traveled over roads and tracks in all temperatures; and did not encounter difficulty in the mountain routes where grades can reach 25%. In Spain Ro's still proved reliable on roads, but its capacities over ground were very limited.

The Lancia Ro was used by Royal Italian Army and Wehrmacht in World War II in all theaters of the war.

== Lancia 3Ro ==
Lancia 3Ro
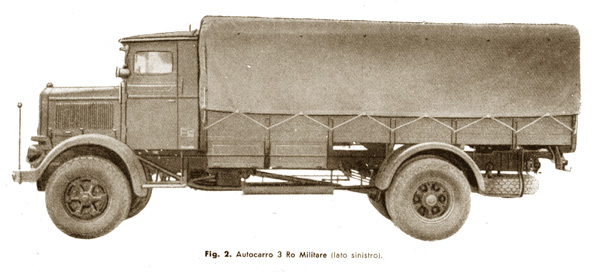
- Lancia 3 Ro Militare
- Type: Military heavy truck
- Place of origin: ITA

Service history
- Used by: Italy, Germany
- Wars: World War II

Production history
- Designed: 1938
- Manufacturer: Lancia
- Produced: 1938–1950
- No. built: 9490 diesel (WWII)

Specifications
- Mass: 5,610 kg
- Length: 7,084 mm
- Width: 2,350 mm
- Height: 3,000 mm
- Crew: 1
- Engine: 6.9L I5 (93 PS @ 1860 rpm)
- Payload capacity: 6,500 kg
- Transmission: 4 forward 1 reverse
- Fuel capacity: 6,875 cc
- Operational range: 450 km (24 litres/100 km) diesel
- Maximum speed: 45 km/h (diesel)

The Lancia 3Ro 4x2 heavy truck evolved from the earlier Lancia Ro by receiving a stronger five cylinder engine to replace two and three cylinder engines, pneumatic tires and an improved transmission; it is best known for its role as one of the main trucks of the Royal Italian Army in World War II. The Lancia 3 Ro's design was simple, functional and was considered the most reliable heavy truck of the Royal Italian Army in World War II serving in all theatres of the war.

Besides the diesel military model, the 3Ro was also built in civilian versions, with petrol and gas engines, as well as in extended wheelbase coach chassis. Production of the 3Ro chassis began in 1939, continued throughout the Second World War and finally ended in 1949, when it was superseded by the Lancia Esatau.

=== Specifications ===
The 3Ro used a ladder frame and leaf spring-suspended solid axles front and rear.

Powering diesel 3Ro was a Lancia Tipo 102 6,875 cc (420 cu in) straight-five diesel engine, with two parallel overhead valves per cylinder, which developed 93 hp (69 kW) at 1,860 rpm. Like on the Ro the transmission used a 4-speed plus reverse gearbox complemented by a low range gearing, for a total of 8 forward and 2 reverse speeds.

Brakes were servo-assisted, mechanically operated drums on all four wheels, plus hydraulic emergency hand brake also on all four wheels.

=== Models ===
==== 3Ro NM ====
The 3Ro NM (564B), for Nafta Militare or "diesel, military", military truck was produced in 9,490 units from 1938 to 1943. It was built with a 4,300 mm (169.3 in) wheelbase.

==== 3Ro ====
The civilian 3Ro (564) truck was produced in 1,307 units from 1938 to 1945. Mechanically the chassis was identical to the military version.

After the production of a modified civilian 3Ro began, coded 564C. In total between 1936 and 1947 3,336 were made.

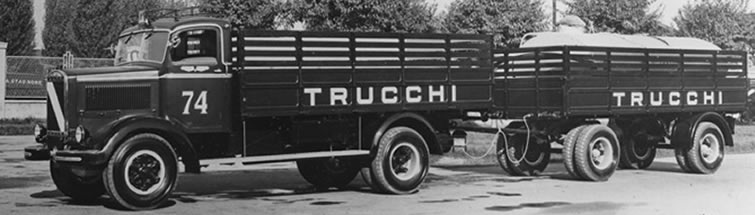
Civilian 3Ro with trailer

==== 3Ro P and PL ====
The 3Ro P (266P) and 3Ro PL (266PL) were stretched chassis to serve as basis for buses and coaches, whose wheelbases measured respectively 4,850 mm (190.9 in) and 5,600 mm (220.5 in). Between 1939 and 1949 837 were made.

In 1941 some 3Ro 266P were built with a Tipo 102C natural gas engine, developed from the inline-five diesel, with four valves per cylinder.

==== 3Ro BM ====
From 1943 to 1945 a total of 408 petrol-engined 3Ro BM (564B), for Benzina Militare or "petrol, military", were produced. Like the natural gas engine, the Tipo 102B inline-five petrol was derived from the diesel, with new 16-valve heads.

==== Esaro ====
The Lancia Esaro was a shortened version of the 3Ro, produced from 1943 to 1946 in military and civilian versions, with 5-cylinder petrol and diesel engines. At 3,650 mm (143.7 in), the Esaro's wheelbase was 650 mm (25.6 in) shorter than the military 3Ro's. Production amounted to 2000 of the petrol variant (made between 1943 and 1946), and just 21 diesels (all made during 1946).

3Ro wartime production
Year	Number
1939	657
1940	2,646
1941	3,162
1942	1,643
1943	1,205
1944	51
1945	1

=== Service history ===
Over the course of the war many variants of the military 3Ro were made: troop transport, supply transport, 5,000-litre fuel tanker, 4,000-litre water tanker, mobile repair workshop, anti-aircraft, and self-propelled gun.

In North Africa and Sicily with the top of the cab cut away and lower sideboards the Lancia 3 Ro became well suited for desert warfare serving as a self-propelled gun porting the Cannone da 90/53 as well as the 100/17 howitzer. German armed forces always in need of supplies and material made use of any Ro and 3Ro as well as any other equipment, Italian or otherwise, that came into their possession.

After the Italian armistice of September 8, 1943, the Wehrmacht absorbed commandeered Ro and 3Ro trucks from their former ally. In April 1944 with the Lancia factory in German controlled Italy, German armed forces placed an order for 772 3Ro built between January 1944 and February 1945. After the end of the war the 3Ro remained in service in the Italian Army, with the last 3Ro truck being retired in 1964.

== See also ==
- List of Italian military vehicles of the Second World War
- Lancia 1Z
- Lancia Jota
- Lince

== Bibliography ==
- Pignacca, Brizio (2003). Ruote in divisa: un secolo di veicoli militari (1st ed.). Vimodrone (Milan): Giorgio Nada Editore. ISBN 88-7911-283-X. LCCN 2003361187.
- Condolo, Massimo (2001). Camion Lancia (1st ed.). Fondazione Negri. LCCN 2002322840.
- Storia illustrata del camion italiano. Edizione Neri. 1996. ISBN 978-88-900955-8-0.
- Pignato, Nicola; Cappellano, Filippo (2002). Gli autoveicoli da combattimento dell'esercito italiano, vol. 1 (1st ed.). Rome: USSME. ISBN 88-87940-28-2. LCCN 2004424840.
- Pignato, Nicola; Cappellano, Filippo (2002). Gli autoveicoli da combattimento dell'esercito italiano, vol. 2 (1st ed.). Rome: USSME. ISBN 8887940290. LCCN 2004424840.
- Ceva, L.; Curami, A. La meccanizzazione dell'esercito fino al 1943. USSME.
- Pignato, Nicola (1998). Gli autoveicoli del Regio Esercito nella seconda guerra mondiale. Storia Militare. ISBN 88-87372-04-7.
- Riccio, Ralph; Pignato, Nicola (2010). Italian Truck Mounted Artillery: In Action. In Action Series. Squadron/Signal Publications. ISBN 978-0-89747-601-0.
- Amatori, Franco; et al. (1992). Storia della Lancia — Impresa Tecnologie Mercati 1906–1969. Milan: Fabbri Editori. p. 350.
