= Lancia Jota =

Lancia Jota series
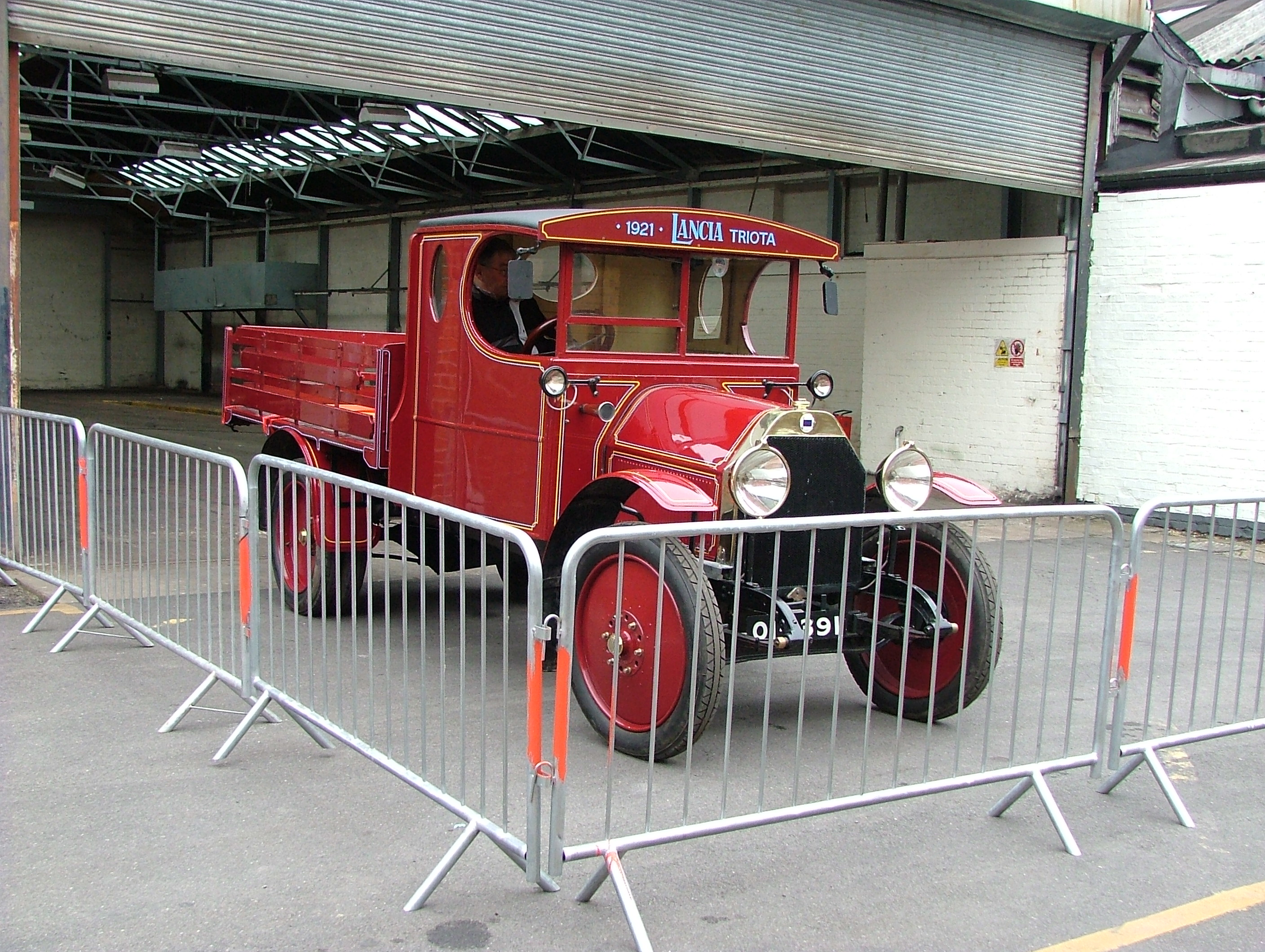
- 1921 Lancia Triota

Overview
- Type: Truck; Bus
- Manufacturer: Lancia
- Also called: Lancia Jota; Lancia Djota; Lancia Triota; Lancia Tetrajota; Lancia Pentaiota; Lancia Esajota; Lancia Eptajota
- Production: 1915–1935

Body and chassis
- Layout: Front-engine, rear-wheel-drive
- Related: Lancia 1Z, Lancia Theta-35HP

Powertrain
- Engine: 4,940 cc I4 (petrol)
- Transmission: 4-speed manual

Chronology
- Successor: Lancia Ro

The Lancia Jota (from the Greek letter iota) is a series of truck and bus chassis produced by Lancia between 1915 and 1935. The original 1915 Jota was the first true Lancia truck; throughout the following two decades it was made in a number of different series and variants, each identified by a progressive Greek numeral prefix added to the name, from Djota to the last Eptajota. While axle tracks, wheelbase and equipment gradually grew, the original layout and 4,940 cc four-cylinder petrol engine were retained.

Though most were used as basis for military trucks, goods transport vehicles, or buses, Jota-series chassis had diverse applications, including special purpose trucks and artillery tractors.

== Models ==
=== Jota ===
The Jota was Lancia's first truck, designed for military use. Production for the Royal Italian Army began in 1915, and continued throughout World War I, making up two thirds of Lancia's total wartime production of roughly 3,000 vehicles.

The Jota was powered by the Tipo 61 4,940 cc side valve, monobloc inline-four, with 70 hp at 2,200 rpm, from the 1912 Lancia 1Z military light truck and 1913 35 HP Theta passenger car. Front and rear the Jota used solid axles on semi-elliptic leaf springs; brakes were on the transmission and on the rear wheels, and the transmission was a 4-speed gearbox with a multi-plate dry clutch.

=== Djota ===
A short-wheelbase version of the Jota, it was produced in comparatively small numbers and almost exclusively for the military during the war.

=== Triota ===
The postwar 1921 Triota adopted a modified Tipo 64 engine as well as a different Tipo 107 gearbox, in place of the previous tipo 61 and tipo 106.

=== Tetrajota ===
Also launched in 1921, the Tetrajota had widened front and rear axles, a design carried over to all subsequent models.

=== Pentajota ===
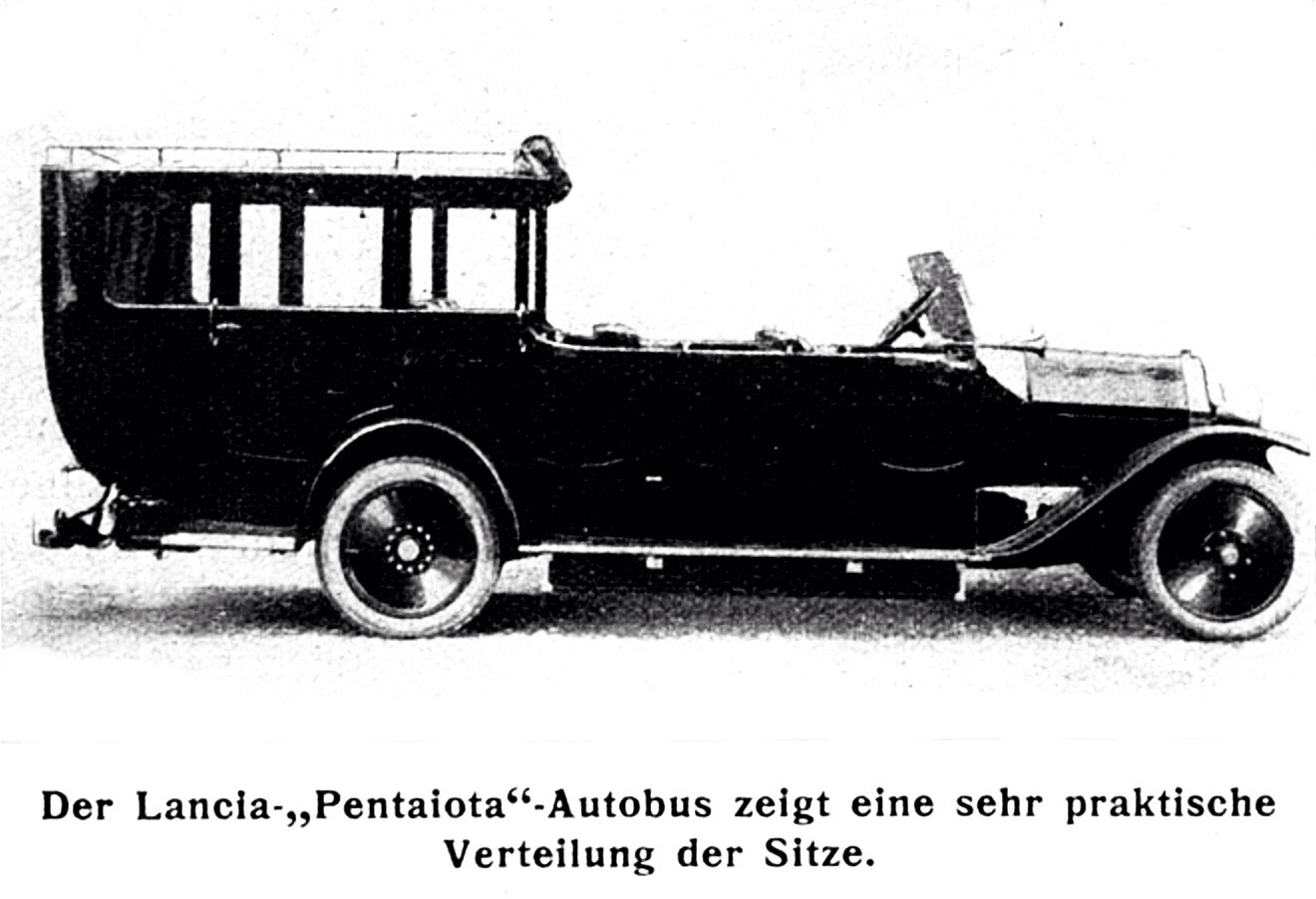
Lancia Pentajota (1924-1929)

In 1924 Lancia replaced Tetrajota with the Pentajota. Available in normale (4.3 m) or corto (short, 3.8 m) wheelbase, with almost 2,200 made it was the most successful model in the series. A Pentajota normale had a loading area of 7.77 m^{2} (83.6 sq ft) and could carry 5.3 metric tons of goods, more than twice as much as the first Jota. It introduced to the series four wheel brakes (front pedal-actuated, rear hand brake) and a new Tipo 111 gearbox.

=== Esajota ===
The Esajota was a very long wheelbase bus chassis. It was built in 13 examples during 1926, and was replaced by the dedicated Lancia Omicron in 1927.

=== Eptajota ===
The final 1927 Eptajota was available in normale (4.7 m) or allungato (extended, 5.0 m) wheelbase.

Eptajota buses were used for the needs of public transport by ATAG in Rome, as well as in Milan and other towns and cities in Italy.

=== Specifications ===
| Model | | Production years | Wheelbase mm (in) | Front track mm (in) | Rear track mm (in) | Top speed km/h (mph) | No. made |
|---|---|---|---|---|---|---|---|
| Jota | | 1915–1920 | 3,600 (141.7) | 1,400 (55.1) | 1,428 (56.2) | 65 (40) | 2131 |
| Djota | | 1915–1919 | 3,000 (118.1) | 1,430 (56.3) | 1,428 (56.2) | 60 (37) | 170 |
| Triota | | 1921–1922 | 3,350 (131.9) | 1,430 (56.3) | 1,428 (56.2) | 65 (40) | 256 |
| Tetrajota | | 1921–1928 | 3,850 (151.6) | 1,648 (64.9) | 1,610 (63.4) | 65 (40) | 417 |
| Pentajota | normale | 1924–1929 | 4,310 (169.7) | 1,648 (64.9) | 1,610 (63.4) | 55 (34) | 2191 |
| Pentajota | corto (SWB) | 1924–1933 | 3,850 (151.6) | 1,648 (64.9) | 1,610 (63.4) | 55 (34) | 2191 |
| Esajota (bus) | | 1926 | 5,180 (203.9) | 1,648 (64.9) | 1,610 (63.4) | 50 (31) | 13 |
| Eptajota | normale | 1927–1935 | 4,724 (186.0) | 1,648 (64.9) | 1,610 (63.4) | 55 (34) | 1985 |
| Eptajota | allungato (LWB) | 1927–1935 | 5,025 (197.8) | 1,648 (64.9) | 1,610 (63.4) | 55 (34) | 1985 |

== Bibliography ==
- Amatori, Franco; et al. (1992). Storia della Lancia — Impresa Tecnologie Mercati 1906–1969. Milan: Fabbri Editori.
