= Lancia Zeta (1912) =

Lancia 12 HP

Overview
- Manufacturer: Lancia
- Also called: Lancia Zeta
- Production: 1912–1914

Body and chassis
- Layout: Front-engine, rear-wheel-drive

Powertrain
- Engine: 2,620 cc I4
- Transmission: 2-speed manual, 2 final drives

Dimensions
- Wheelbase: 2,850, 2,795 mm (112.2, 110.0 in)
- Curb weight: 740 kg (1,631 lb) (chassis)

The Lancia 12 HP, later known as Lancia Zeta, is a passenger car produced by Lancia between 1912 and 1914. It was intended to be Lancia's smaller offering, positioned below the 4-litre 20/30HP Delta and Epsilon models. The Zeta did not prove a success, and production is estimated at just 34 examples (for comparison, 351 20/30 HP Epsilons were made in 1911–1912); none have survived.

== Specifications ==
The Zeta was powered by a Tipo 59 side valve monobloc inline-four, displacing 2,620 cc, which produced 30 hp at 1,800 rpm. Top speed was 100 km/h (62 mph).

The separate body was built on a ladder frame; front and rear there were solid axles on semi-elliptic leaf springs. The brakes were drums on the rear wheels, with both lever and pedal actuation. The transmission was a 2-speed gearbox, which coupled to the two different sets of final drives at the rear axle effectively gave the car four speed; the clutch was of the multi-plate dry type.

== Bibliography ==
- Amatori, Franco; et al. (1992). Storia della Lancia — Impresa Tecnologie Mercati 1906–1969. Milan: Fabbri Editori. pp. 350–351.
