= Lancia Dikappa =

Overview
- Manufacturer: Lancia
- Production: 1921–1922

Body and chassis
- Layout: Front-engine, rear-wheel-drive
- Related: Lancia Kappa

Powertrain
- Engine: 4,940 cc OHV I4
- Transmission: 4-speed manual

Dimensions
- Wheelbase: 3,388 mm (133.4 in)
- Curb weight: 1,300 kg (2,866 lb) (chassis)

Chronology
- Predecessor: Lancia Theta-35HP
- Successor: Lancia Lambda

The Lancia Dikappa is a passenger car produced by Lancia between 1921 and 1922. It was a factory-offered sport version of the Kappa model, with overhead valves and a lighter body. 160 were made in the two years of production.

== Specifications ==
The Dikappa's Tipo 66 inline-four engine was based on the Kappa's Tipo 64, but had two parallel overhead valves per cylinder instead of side valves. Displacing 4,940 cc, it developed 87 hp at 2,300 rpm. The Dikappa was offered with a light torpedo body, of walnut wood construction covered with aluminium sheet metal; wire wheels also contributed to the weight reduction. Top speed was 130 km/h (81 mph), up from the Kappa's 125 km/h (78 mph).

The rest of the mechanicals were akin to the Kappa's: ladder frame, solid axles on semi-elliptic leaf springs front and rear, transmission brake and rear-wheel drum brakes, 4-speed gearbox and a multi-plate dry clutch.

== Bibliography ==
- Frostick, Michael (1976). Lancia. ISBN 0-901564-22-2.
- Amatori, Franco; et al. (1992). Storia della Lancia — Impresa Tecnologie Mercati 1906–1969. Milan: Fabbri Editori. pp. 351–353.
