= Lancia 1Z =

Italian light military truck

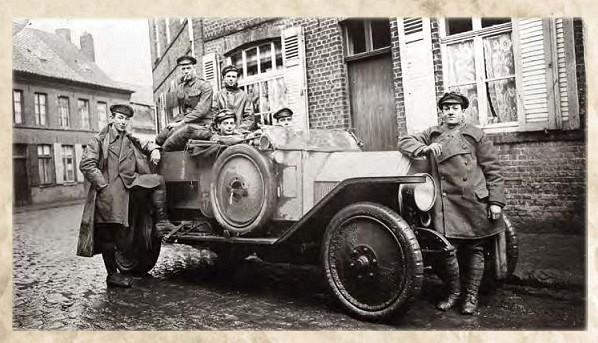
- Lancia 1Z in the service of the Royal Naval Air Service
- Type: Light military truck
- Place of origin: Italy

Service history
- Used by: Royal Italian Army; Royal Naval Air Service
- Wars: Italo-Turkish War; First World War

Production history
- Manufacturer: Lancia
- Produced: 1912–1916
- No. built: 91

Specifications
- Length: 5,100 mm (200 in)
- Width: 1,750 mm (69 in)
- Engine: Lancia tipo 61; 4,490 cc I4 petrol 70 hp
- Payload capacity: 2.2 t
- Transmission: 4-speed gearbox
- Suspension: Leaf springs
- Maximum speed: 60 km/h (37 mph)

The Lancia 1Z was a light military truck produced by Italian manufacturer Lancia between 1912 and 1916. From a mechanical standpoint, it was closely related to the 1913 35 HP Theta passenger car. It was Lancia's first military vehicle.

== Development and service history ==
At the outbreak of the Italo-Turkish War of 1911, the Royal Italian Army, whose motorisation had only begun a few years before, was chiefly equipped with Fiat 15 trucks. After a positive experience on the field, the army handed out additional procurements contracts of trucks for tactical and logistical use, to both Fiat and other manufacturers. One of them was Lancia, which developed the 1Z and began deliveries in 1912, in time for the vehicle to see war service on the harsh terrains of Libya. Production and army use continued into the First World War.

During the First World War a number of 1Zs were imported into the United Kingdom by Gaston, Williams and Wigmore. Used by the Royal Naval Air Service as light tenders, they were rated for 30 cwt (1 1/2 long ton; 1.52 t) payloads in British service.

In 1916, Ansaldo and Lancia jointly built an armored car on the 1Z chassis, named Automitragliatrice Lancia Ansaldo 1Z. These were the Royal Italian Army main armored vehicle and were used in riot control and later in the war to quickly exploit infantry breakthroughs. An improved type, the Lancia Ansaldo 1ZM, was produced in 1918.

In 1915, Lancia introduced the Jota truck, which used the same 4.5-litre engine but had a dedicated chassis; production of the 1Z truck subsequently ended during 1916.

== Self-propelled artillery ==
In 1917 the 1Z truck was selected as the carrier for Cannone da 75/26 A.V. guns to form self-propelled anti-aircraft artillery; designated Autocannone da 75/27 C.K., the weapon system consisted of an anti-aircraft gun permanently installed in the bed of a partially armored 1Z. The pintle mounted 75/26 A.V. (Anti Velivolo, anti-aircraft) was based on the 75/27 Mod. 1906 (Note: License-built Krupp field gun adopted by the Royal Italian Army.) field gun modified for use in the anti-aircraft role. The initial order of 50 guns was later halved to 25, to form six mobile batteries (Autobatterie) which were delivered in summer 1918; the experiment was short lived, as the weapon did not prove satisfactory in the field and the guns were soon dismounted to be used in static positions.

The Italian artillery arm also used the 1Z as a gun platform in a self-propelled artillery role carrying 75/27 Mod. 1911 guns portee-style. Six batteries were formed in late 1918, and from 1920 to 1928 were assigned to the horse artillery branch.

== Specifications ==
The 1Z was powered by the Tipo 61 4,940 cc side valve, monobloc inline four-cylinder engine delivering 70 hp (52 kW) at 2,200 rpm. The chassis was a conventional ladder frame with solid axles on semi-elliptic leaf springs; brakes were on the transmission and on the rear wheels. The transmission was a Tipo 105 4-speed manual gearbox with a multi-plate dry clutch. Main differences from the Theta's mechanicals were wider axle tracks, and tyres and metal disc wheels more suited to military use. The vehicle had a top speed of 60 km/h (37 mph) and could carry 2.2 tons of cargo.

== Notes and references ==
=== Bibliography ===
- Amatori, Franco; et al. (1992). Storia della Lancia — Impresa Tecnologie Mercati 1906–1969. Milan: Fabbri Editori.
- Gosling, Tim (15 November 2018). "Motorising an Air Force". Key Military. Stamford: Key Publishing.
- Riccio, Ralph; Pignato, Nicola. Italian Truck Mounted Artillery: In Action. In Action Series. Squadron/Signal Publications. ISBN 978-0-89747-601-0.
