= Lancia Kappa (1919) =

Overview
- Manufacturer: Lancia
- Production: 1919–1922

Body and chassis
- Layout: Front-engine, rear-wheel-drive
- Related: Lancia Dikappa

Powertrain
- Engine: 4,940 cc I4
- Transmission: 4-speed manual

Dimensions
- Wheelbase: 3,388 mm (133.4 in)
- Curb weight: 1,100 kg (2,425 lb) (chassis)

Chronology
- Predecessor: Lancia Theta-35HP
- Successor: Lancia Lambda

The Lancia Kappa is a passenger car produced by Lancia between 1919 and 1922. Launched as Lancia's first post-war model, it was an updated version of the earlier Theta. 1,810 were made in total, surpassing the Theta as the best-selling Lancia motor car at the time.

== Specifications ==
The Kappa's Tipo 64 side valve inline-four was Lancia's first engine with a separate cylinder head, as opposed to the earlier monobloc designs. Displacing 4,940 cc, it produced 70 hp at 2,200 rpm for a top speed of 125 km/h (78 mph).

The separate body was built on a ladder frame; front and rear there were solid axles on semi-elliptic leaf springs, brakes were on the transmission and on the rear wheels. The transmission was a 4-speed gearbox with a multi-plate dry clutch.

== Bibliography ==
- Frostick, Michael (1976). Lancia. ISBN 0-901564-22-2.
- Amatori, Franco; et al. (1992). Storia della Lancia — Impresa Tecnologie Mercati 1906–1969. Milan: Fabbri Editori. p. 351.
