= Lancia Eta =

Overview
- Manufacturer: Lancia
- Production: 1911–1914; 491 produced

Body and chassis
- Layout: RWD

Powertrain
- Engine: 4084 cc I4
- Transmission: 4-speed manual gearbox

Dimensions
- Wheelbase: 275 cm (108.3 in)
- Curb weight: 880 kg (1,940 lb)

Chronology
- Predecessor: Lancia Delta-20/30HP
- Successor: Lancia Theta-35HP

The Lancia Eta (30/50 HP) is a car which was produced between 1911 and 1914 by Lancia. The Eta was smaller than the Epsilon built at the same time, more like the earlier Delta. From 1913 the Eta could be delivered with electrical lights. The car has a straight-four engine with a capacity of 4084 cc which produced around 60 hp at 1800 rpm. The top speed was around 115 km/h (71 mph).
