= V81 =

V81 may refer to:

- Complaint tablet to Ea-nāṣir
- Lancia Esatau V.81, an Italian bus
