= Lancia Delta (1911) =

Lancia 20-30 HP

Overview
- Manufacturer: Lancia
- Also called: Lancia Delta
- Production: 1911
- Assembly: Turin, Italy

Body and chassis
- Layout: Front-engine, rear-wheel-drive

Powertrain
- Engine: 4,080 cc Tipo 56 I4 (petrol)
- Transmission: 4-speed manual

Dimensions
- Wheelbase: 2,740, 2,932 mm (107.9, 115.4 in)
- Width: 1,615 mm (63.6 in)
- Kerb weight: 900 kg (1,984 lb)

Chronology
- Predecessor: Lancia 20 HP Gamma
- Successor: Lancia 20-30 HP Epsilon

The Lancia 20-30 HP (Tipo 56), later renamed Lancia Delta, (Note: All early Lancia models were named after their tax horsepower rating, as was common practice; when in 1919 Lancia began naming its passenger cars with Greek alphabet letters, all earlier models were posthumously renamed in order of appearance—from the 1907 Alfa to the 1913 Theta.) is a passenger car produced by Italian car manufacturer Lancia during 1911. The Delta was based on the earlier 20 HP Gamma, with an enlarged engine. 303 Deltas were made in total, before it was replaced by the improved 20-30 HP Epsilon.

The Delta was built with two wheelbases, normal and short. The latter was destined for competition-oriented Corsa models, to be bodied as open two- or three-seaters.

== Specifications ==
The Delta was powered by a Tipo 56 side valve monobloc inline-four engine with a cast iron block. Cylinder bore measured 100 mm (3.9 in), and stroke 130 mm (5.1 in)—up 20 mm from the Gamma's Tipo 55—for a total displacement of 4,080 cc (249 cu in). Output was 60 hp (45 kW) at 1800 rpm, and the car could reach a top speed of 115 km/h (71 mph).

The transmission was a 4-speed gearbox with a multi-plate wet clutch. The chassis was a conventional ladder frame, with solid axles sprung on semi-elliptic front and three-quarter-elliptic rear leaf springs. The brakes were on the transmission and on the rear wheels.

== Bibliography ==
- Frostick, Michael (1976). Lancia. D. Watson. ISBN 0-901564-22-2.
- Amatori, Franco; et al. (1992). Storia della Lancia — Impresa Tecnologie Mercati 1906–1969. Milan: Fabbri Editori. p. 349.
