= Robypolarbear =

Italian YouTuber

- Born: 2003 (age 22–23)

YouTube information
- Channel: Roby_

Roberta Alcamo (born 2003; also known as Roby) is an Italian video game YouTuber and author from Palermo. She gained popularity among young audiences for her videos centered on the online game Roblox, personal storytelling, and her polar bear costume.

== Career ==
Alcamo launched her YouTube channel in January 2020, focusing on content related to the online game Roblox. Her videos include gameplay, narratives of stories she created, and personal vlogs. The channel quickly gained a large following among children and teenagers. By April 2022, she had reached 760,000 subscribers, and had reached more than a million subscribers by May 2023.

In 2021, she published her first book, Alla ricerca del pet leggendario (Rizzoli), which reached top positions on Italian sales charts.

== Personal life ==
Alcamo was born in 2003. She graduated from high school in 2021.

== Publications ==
- Alla ricerca del pet leggendario. Fabbri Editori. 2021-09-14. ISBN 9788891585431.
  - Roberta Alcamo's debut comic book, set in the world of Roblox, follows the adventures of Roby and her friends as they embark on a quest to find a legendary pet.
- Il fantastico viaggio nel mondo dei Pet. Un'avventura a fumetti. Fabbri Editori. 2022-05-17. ISBN 9788891586704.
  - The sequel to her first book, this comic continues the adventures in the virtual world of Roblox, introducing new characters and challenges.
- L'ultima sfida dei Pet. Un'avventura a fumetti. Fabbri Editori. 2023.
- L'accademia del caos. Fabbri Editori. 2023. ISBN 9788891589019.
  - The book centers on a chaotic academy where unexpected events unfold, blending elements of fantasy and adventure.
- Un mondo perfetto. Fabbri Editori. 2024.
  - This publication explores the concept of a perfect world, challenging characters to navigate and question the idea of perfection in a fantastical setting.
- Una piccola peste. Un'avventura a fumetti. Fabbri Editori. 2024. ISBN 9791223400272.
  - A standalone comic book featuring a mischievous character who embarks on various adventures, bringing humor and excitement to young readers.
- I Manga di Roby: Agenzia Tradimenti. Vol. 1. Fabbri Editori. 2024. ISBN 9788891594389.
  - The first volume in a new manga series, this book introduces the "Agenzia Tradimenti" (Agency of Betrayals), offering a blend of mystery and drama.
- I Manga di Roby: Agenzia Tradimenti. Vol. 2. Fabbri Editori. 2024.
- I Manga di Roby: Agenzia Tradimenti. Vol. 3. Fabbri Editori. 2025.
- I Manga di Roby: Agenzia Tradimenti. Vol. 4. Fabbri Editori. 2025.
