= Wheelspin =

Type of wheel behavior

Wheelspin occurs when the force delivered to the tire tread exceeds that of available tread-to-surface friction and one or more tires lose traction. This leads the wheels to "spin" and causes the driver to lose control over the tires that no longer have grip on the road surface. Wheelspin can also be done intentionally such as in drifting or doing a burnout. Often done by locking the driving tires (Rear wheels in RWD, front tires in FWD or all the tires in AWD) using a handbrake or the foot brake and them applying throttle until the tires break loose.

== Applications ==
=== Differentials ===
Standard differentials (also referred to as "open" differentials) always apply equal torque to each wheel. In low traction situations, the total torque delivered to each wheel is limited to the torque that is required to make the wheel with the least traction slip.

During a turn, the weight of the vehicle shifts away from the inner radius and to the outer radius, therefore the inner drive-wheel will often lose traction on hard cornering, and especially when accelerating through a curve. Locking differentials and limited-slip differentials modify the manner in which torque is distributed to the wheels to reduce wheelspin and improve traction in situations where it is limited.

Wheels can also lose traction when surface conditions reduce available traction such as on snow and ice. As an open differential delivers only enough torque to cause the "weakest" wheel to spin, if one drive wheel is stationary on a low traction surface (mud, ice, etc.), the deliverable torque is limited to the traction available on it.

=== Oversteer ===
Oversteer is typically the result of wheelspin, causing the vehicle to lose traction and turn too sharp through a turn. Oversteer can be caused in two different ways, power oversteer and lift-off oversteer. Oversteer can be performed either intentionally or accidentally through these two methods and if the driver doesn't know what they are doing then it could result in an accident. Oversteer is a common trait of rear-wheel drive cars and can also occur in all-wheel drive cars. It can be performed in front-wheel drive cars as well, but it is not as common as they tend to understeer.

==== Power oversteer ====
Power oversteer is the process of applying power through the throttle pedal while turning to break the traction forces on the driving wheels. Doing this causes the vehicle to slide, and is also known as a powerslide, and the vehicles movement is primarily based on the non-driving wheels (usually the steering wheels).

==== Lift-off oversteer ====
Wheelspin can also occur when changing gears while the vehicle is in motion, as the inertia of the engine and flywheel rotating at a higher rate than the next highest gear tries to bring the input shaft of the transmission to the same speed. This is known commonly as lift-off oversteer.

=== Understeer ===
Understeer is also a result of wheelspin and traction loss. It results in a vehicle not being able to turn enough when driving through a curve and causes the vehicle to continue forwards instead of turning in the curve. It is caused by using too much power into a turn causing the tires to slide sideways into the curve, preventing the vehicle from turning. Understeer is the easiest form of wheelspin to correct and can usually be done by lifting off of the throttle.

=== Similar terms ===
In railway engineering, the term wheelslip is used as a synonym for wheelspin.

== Prevention ==
=== Traction control ===
Traction control is an electronic system installed in most modern automobiles since 1985. It monitors individual wheel speeds through the Anti-lock Brake System (ABS) or wheel speed sensors and controls engine inputs to maintain stability and traction to the vehicles wheels. When the traction control system notices wheelspin on any of the wheels it limits the fuel provided through the onboard engine management system and controls the speed of the vehicle to prevent excessive wheelspin.

=== Driving techniques ===
There are several driving techniques that you can follow to prevent wheelspin:

- Be easy on the throttle and make smooth inputs
- Do not enter turns too fast, take it slow
- Do not make aggressive braking inputs in the turn
- Do not lift off of the throttle mid-turn
- Do not shift gears in the turn, select your gear before you enter
- Make smooth steering inputs to prevent a large weight shift

== Bibliography ==
- Alexander, Don; Hoyt, Wade (June 1986). "Popular Mechanics". Popular Mechanics Magazine. Vol. 163, no. 6. Hearst Magazines. ISSN 0032-4558 – via Google Books.
- Bentley, Ross (13 August 1998). Speed Secrets: Professional Race Driving Techniques. Motorbooks. ISBN 9781610600019 – via Google Books.

== See also ==
- Burnout (vehicle)
- Drifting (motorsport)
