= Burnout (vehicle) =

Practice of spinning wheels while keeping vehicle stationary

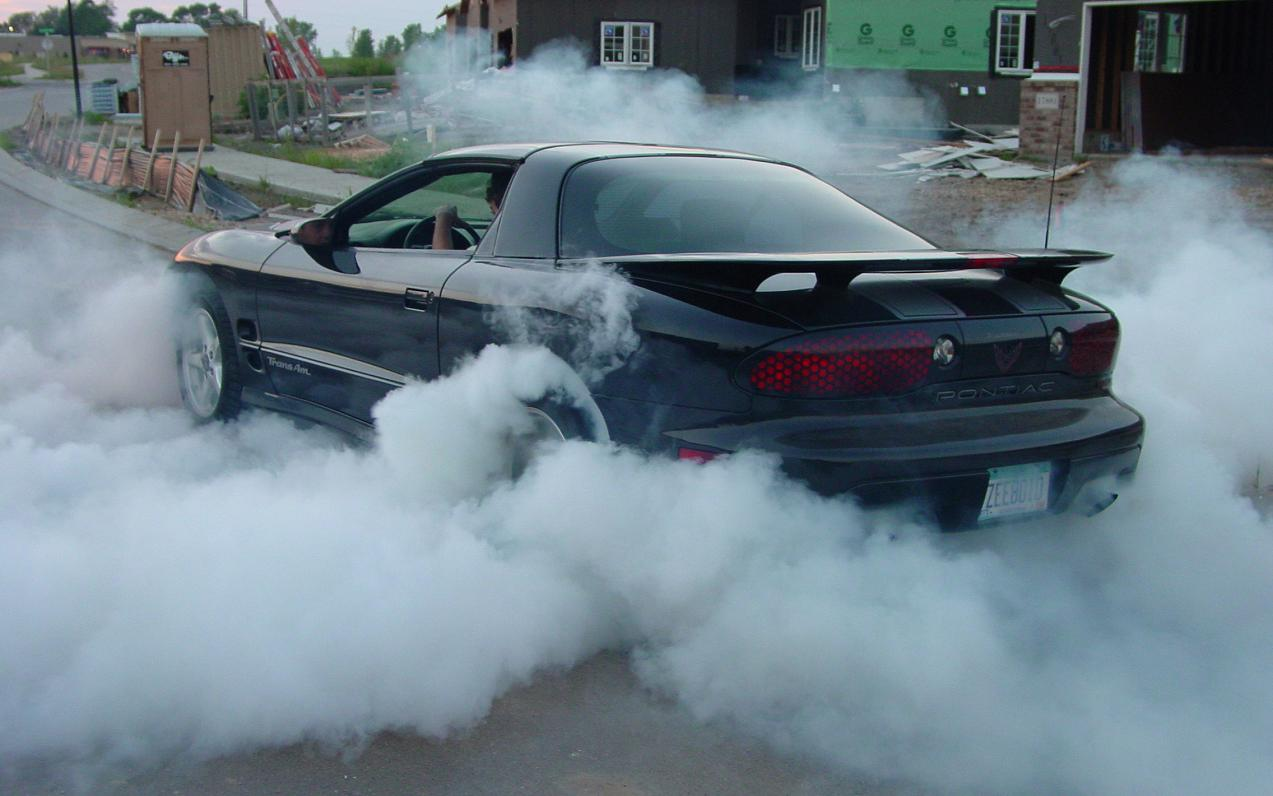
Pontiac Trans Am burnout with line locks.

A burnout (also known as a peel out, power brake, or brakestand) is the practice of keeping a vehicle stationary and spinning its wheels, the resultant friction causing the tires to heat up and smoke. While the burnout gained widespread popularity in California, it was created by Buddy Houston, his brother Melson and David Tatum II at Ted Edwards Drag Strip in Fairburn, Georgia (later to become Houston Bros Drag Strip and Reds Drag Strip) in the mid-1960s.

Given that a burn out burns tire material, the environmental and health risks in the production of fumes are comparable to small tire fires.

== History ==
Burnout in the box at Tarlton International Raceway, South Africa

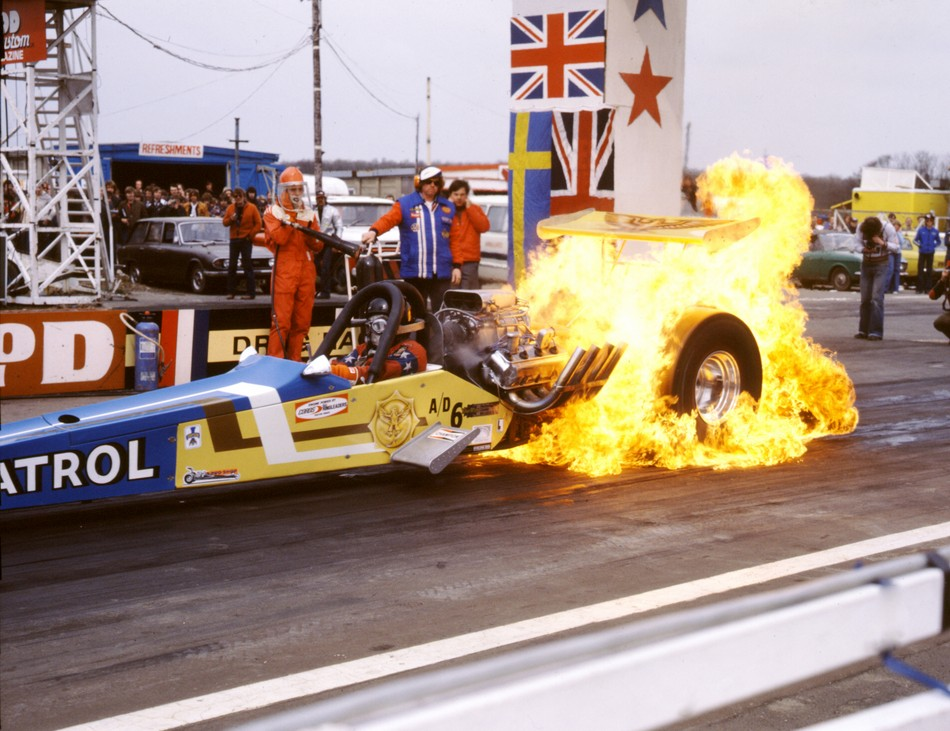
Fire burnout, Santa Pod Raceway, UK

The origins of burnouts can be traced to drag racing, where they have a practical purpose: drag racing slicks perform better at higher temperatures, and a burnout is the quickest way to heat the tires immediately prior to a race. They also clean the tire of any debris and lay down a layer of rubber at the starting line for better traction. The origin of the burnout can be traced to Ted Edwards Drag Strip in Fairburn GA in the mid-1960s (later to become Houston Brothers Drag Strip and Reds Drag Strip and said to be the first drag strip east of the Mississippi River) where Buddy Houston, his brother Melson, and David Tatum II used water and bleach to break the tires loose and spin creating heat thus cleaning the tires prior to pulling up to the line. People would hold the car in place from the rear to start the burnout. The practice gained traction and made its way across the country to widespread popularity in California where the sport was better organized and more popular. Drag race tracks sometimes use a specially-reserved wet-surface area known as the "water box", because water is poured onto a certain area to reduce the friction to initiate the burnout. This was once called a "bleach box", when bleach was used instead of water; this began in 1969, the year the first burnout was done in NHRA, at the Hot Rod Magazine Championship Drag Races in Riverside, California. Don Garlits was the first to do burnouts across the starting line, which later became standard practice. Water, bleach and resin were used, and water is said to work as well as bleach. Early on, traction compound RFI also produced the spectacular flame burnouts. The hazard of using flammable traction compound led NHRA to mandate use of water, instead.

Burnouts eventually became a serious form of competition and entertainment in their own right. Considerable prize money or goods are sometimes involved, and cars may even be sponsored or purpose-built specifically as "burnout cars". Burnout contests are judged on crowd response, with style and attitude as important factors. Such contests are particularly popular in Australia but often also occur in North America.

Burnouts are common in informal street racing, usually for show. As with all street racing activities, burnouts on public property are illegal in most countries but the severity of punishments vary. In New South Wales, Australia, for example, police have the power to confiscate the offending vehicle for 3 months for a first offense. In March 2010, British Formula 1 World Champion Lewis Hamilton had his Mercedes car impounded for allegedly performing a burnout in Melbourne, Australia while leaving the Albert Park Grand-Prix Circuit.

Burnouts are also frequently performed by winning drivers at the end of NASCAR races to celebrate their victory.

== Practice ==
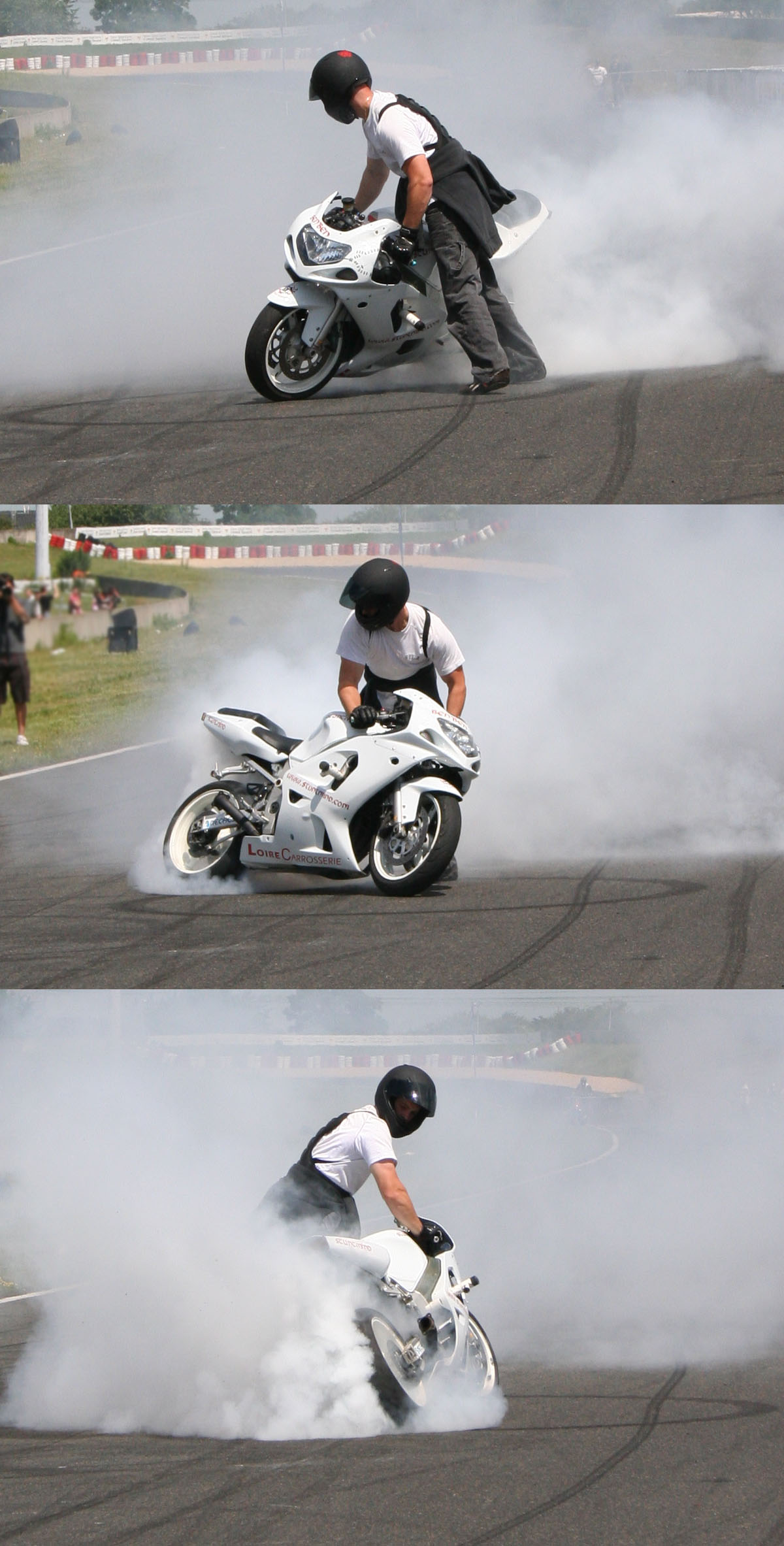
Stopped Burn, Stunt Bike Show, 17 June 2007, Circuit Carole, France

Performing a burnout in a front wheel drive vehicle is usually achieved by engaging the parking brake to lock up the rear tires along with stomping the gas to break the front wheels loose.

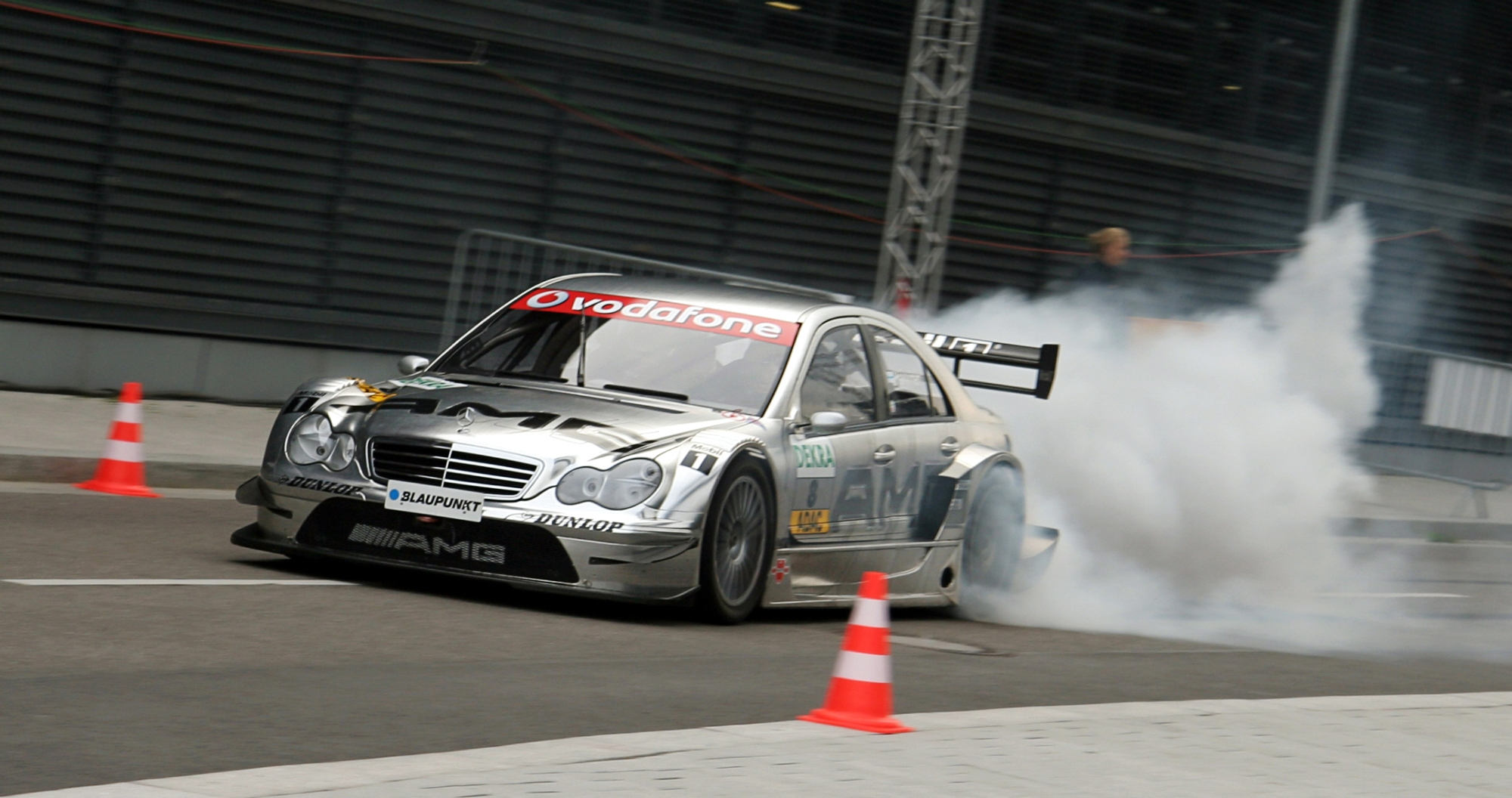
Mercedes-Benz DTM car burnout

To perform a burnout in a rear wheel drive vehicle, the driver has to simultaneously engage the gas and brake pedals. The brake pedal will require modulation, as the goal is to allow the rear tires to spin while holding the car in place with the front wheels remaining motionless. At a certain point of balance, the front brakes will prevent the car from moving forward while the rear brakes will have insufficient grip to keep the wheels from spinning, since engine power is transferred to the rear wheels only.

It is possible to make rear-wheel drive burnouts easier by installing "line locks", which allows the front brakes to be selectively activated by holding down a switch and releasing the brake pedal and freeing the rear brakes.

Burnouts are most difficult to perform in four-wheel drive and all-wheel drive cars, as they have better traction than FWD or RWD vehicles. It requires significantly more powerful engines to break all four tires loose at the same time, and the tires will spin for only a short while before all four gain traction.

== See also ==
- Doughnut
- Drifting
- Line lock
- Wheelspin
- Friction
- Motorcycle stunt riding
- Tire fire
