= Lancia Epsilon =

Lancia 20-30 HP
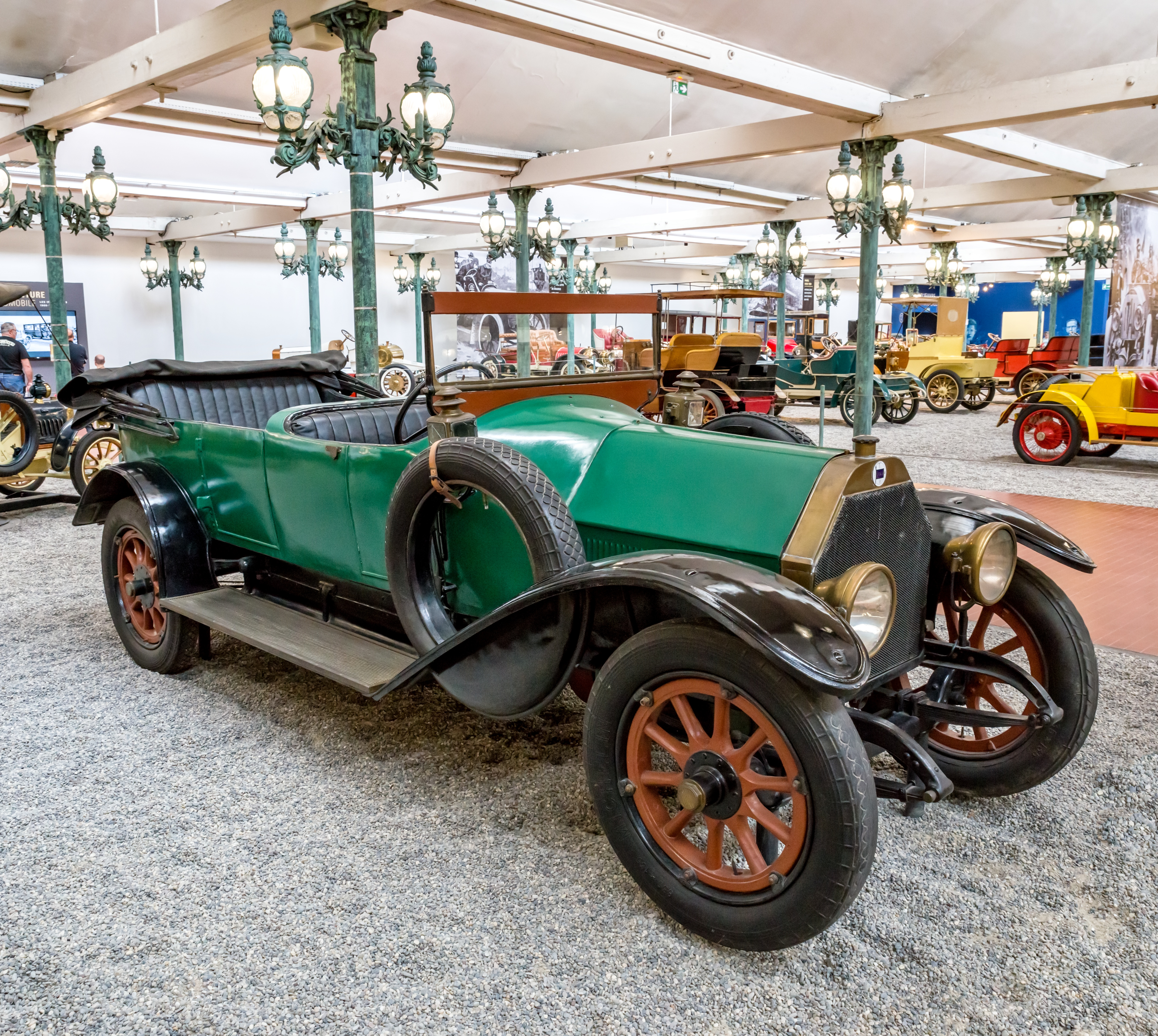
- 1912 Lancia Epsilon with torpedo body

Overview
- Manufacturer: Lancia
- Also called: Lancia Epsilon
- Production: 1911–1912

Body and chassis
- Layout: Front-engine, rear-wheel-drive

Powertrain
- Engine: 4,080 cc I4 (petrol)
- Transmission: 4-speed manual

Dimensions
- Wheelbase: 2,740, 2,932, 3,227 mm (107.9, 115.4, 127.0 in)
- Width: 1,615 mm (63.6 in)
- Kerb weight: 900–990 kg (1,984–2,183 lb)

Chronology
- Predecessor: Lancia 20-30 HP Delta
- Successor: Lancia 35 HP Theta

The Lancia 20/30 HP (Tipo 58), later known as Lancia Epsilon, (Note: All early Lancia models were named after their tax horsepower rating, as was common practice; when in 1919 Lancia began naming its passenger cars with Greek alphabet letters, all earlier models were posthumously renamed in order of appearance—from the 1907 Alfa to the 1913 Theta.) is a passenger car produced by Italian car manufacturer Lancia between 1911 and 1912. The car was quite similar to the previous 20/30 HP Delta model. In total 357 were made.

== Models ==
Three wheelbase lengths were offered, resulting in a choice of five different models—depending on the desired body style:

- Type A: normal wheelbase, for phaetons, landaulets, limousines and coupés
- Type B: long wheelbase, for phaetons, landaulets and limousines
- Type C: short wheelbase Corsa, for competition two- or three-seaters
- Type D: normal wheelbase, for torpedoes
- Type E: long wheelbase, for torpedoes and cabriolets

== Specifications ==
The Epsilon was powered by a Tipo 58 side valve monobloc inline-four, displacing 4,080 cc, which produced 60 hp at 1,500 rpm. Top speed was 115 km/h (71 mph).

The separate body was built on a ladder frame; front and rear there were solid axles on semi-elliptic springs at the front and three-quarter elliptic springs at the rear. The brakes were on the transmission and on the rear wheels. The transmission was a 4-speed gearbox with a multi-plate wet clutch.

== Bibliography ==
- Amatori, Franco; et al. (1992). Storia della Lancia — Impresa Tecnologie Mercati 1906–1969. Milan: Fabbri Editori. p. 350.
