= V11 =

V11 may refer to:

== Aircraft ==
- Fokker V.11, a German experimental biplane
- Mississippi State University XV-11 Marvel, an American experimental aircraft
- Škoda-Kauba V11, a Czechoslovak trainer project
- Vultee V-11, an American attack aircraft

== Other uses ==
- DEC V-11, a miniprocessor chip set
- ITU-T V.11, a telecommunications standard
- Kanding light rail station, in New Taipei, Taiwan
- Lancia Esatau V.11, an Italian bus
- V11 Tongwell Street, a road in the Milton Keynes, England
- V11, a grade in bouldering
- V11, a personal history of mental disorder, in the ICD-9 V codes
