= Lancia Beta (1909) =

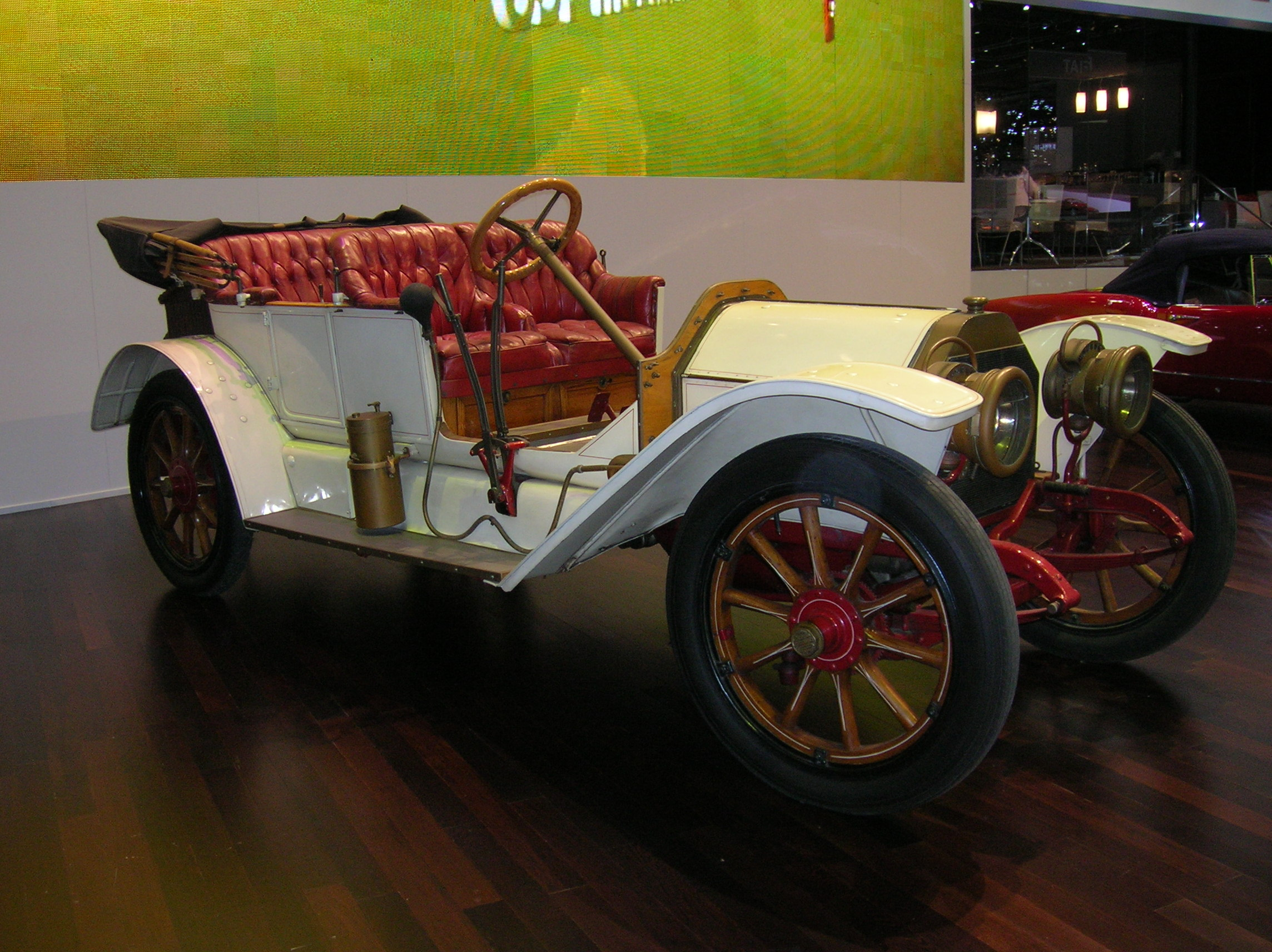

Overview
- Manufacturer: Lancia
- Also called: Lancia Beta-15/20HP
- Production: 1909

Body and chassis
- Body style: Torpedo
- Layout: FR layout

Powertrain
- Engine: 3118.81 cc straight-4 34 hp
- Transmission: 4-speed manual

Dimensions
- Wheelbase: 293 cm (115.4 in)
- Curb weight: 780 kg (1,720 lb)

Chronology
- Predecessor: Lancia Alfa; Lancia Dialfa
- Successor: Lancia Gamma-20HP

The Lancia 15/20HP (Type 54, Beta) is an automobile which was produced by Lancia of Italy in 1909.

The 15/20HP replaced the earlier 12HP-Alfa and 18/24HP Dialfa models. Basically the car was a modernized version of the 12HP with the engine displacement enlarged from 2.5 to 3.1 litres (from 28 hp to 34 hp) and the wheelbase increased from 282 cm (111.0 in) to 293.2 cm (115.4 in). 150 examples were manufactured before it was replaced by the Gamma-20HP model (type 55) in 1910.
