= Line lock =

Vehicle braking technology

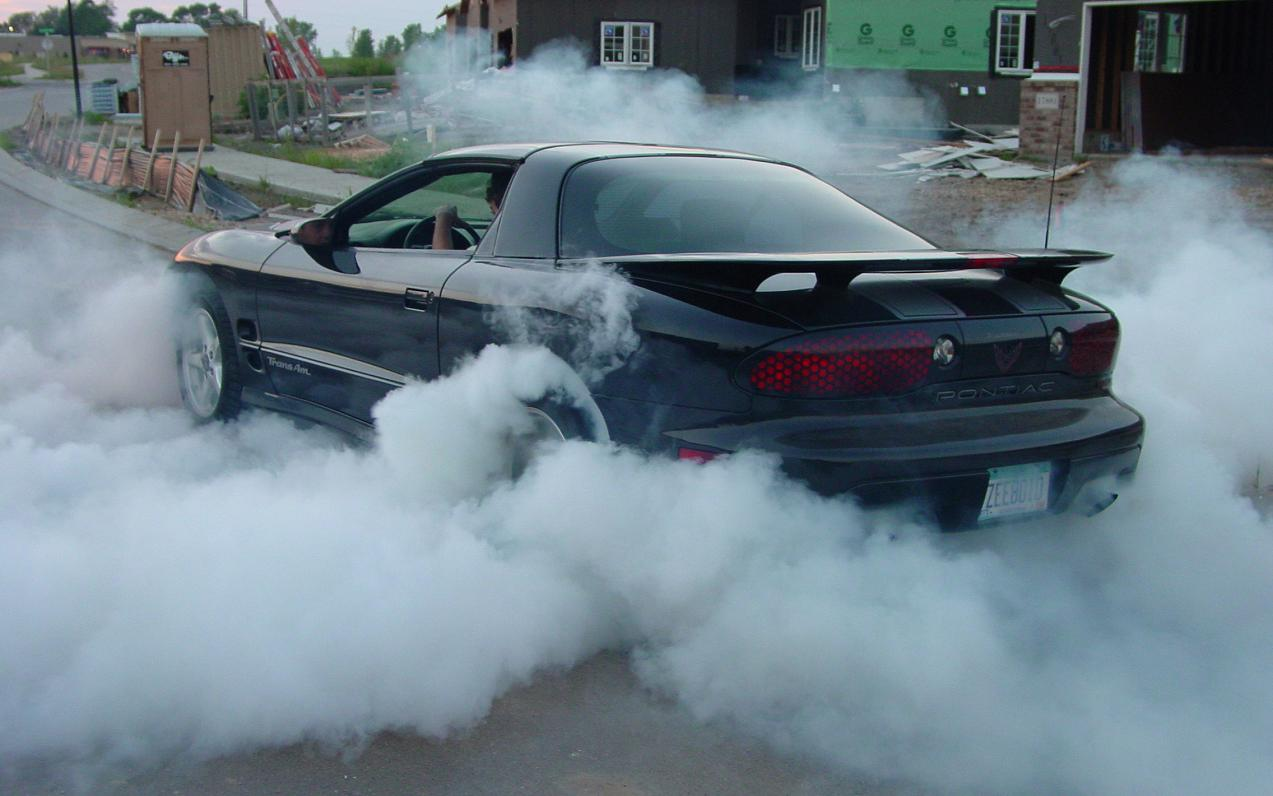
Pontiac Trans Am burnout with line locks.

A line lock is a device that allows the front brakes to lock independently of the rear brakes via a switch. The device is an electric solenoid that controls a valve which allows the brakes to be controlled individually. This allows the front brakes to be locked and the rear brakes to be open, and allows the driver to spin the rear wheels without wasting the rear brakes. This method is referred to as line lock and is popular among enthusiasts who like to do burnouts.

== History ==
Drag racing is a motorsport often run using cars with manual transmissions. Manual transmissions allow drivers to control the amount of power transferred from the engine to the wheels by manipulating both clutch and throttle inputs, allowing vehicles to accelerate quickly without losing traction. However, launching a vehicle requires simultaneous gas pedal and clutch pedal inputs, preventing drivers from manipulating the brakes with their feet. Without brake input, drivers staging their vehicle at the starting line would roll if the clutch was slightly engaged. If the driver's vehicle rolled across the staging line before the start of a drag race, the driver could "red light" and would disqualify them from that race, nullifying the results or being declared DNF ("did not finish"). The line lock prevents vehicles from rolling by allowing the driver to control the clutch and accelerator using foot input and braking with the hand. In an automatic transmission vehicle, a line lock allows the engine to rev up to its peak power RPM and launch aggressively from the starting line.

== Usage ==
Line locks are often used for burnouts by fully locking the front wheels and then engaging the gas pedal and disengaging the clutch pedal. This makes the rear tires spin but keeps the car stationary.

Although less common, rolling burnouts can be achieved with modified line locks by proportionally increasing the front brake pressure and the throttle to keep the car at a steady speed. This makes the rear tires slip and spin faster than the front tires and burnout.

Line locks can also be installed on the rear brake lines. When the line lock is activated, fluid pressure is prevented from being transferred to the rear, allowing the rear wheels to spin freely while the front brakes can be controlled with the brake pedal. This allows one to creep at varying speeds while maintaining a burnout. Achieving such a burnout requires manipulation of both throttle and brake inputs. The burnout is initiated by manipulating the clutch with the left foot and both the brake and gas pedal with the right foot. The brakes must be held while revving up the engine, then the clutch is released while continuing to hold the brakes. Once the rear tires start spinning, the left foot is used to control the brakes while the right foot continues to control the throttle. The only advantage for such a setup is the ability to maintain a burnout at relatively low wheel speeds, which reduces wear on the rear tires. This method can be used to increase tire temperature to provide better traction prior to a drag run, but it is also often used purely for show, such as in drifting exhibitions or simply for the personal enjoyment of the driver. Many modern sport-oriented cars now offer optional line locks for drag and show purposes, such as the so-called "burnout mode" found on the 2015 Ford Mustang.

== As a temporary parking brake ==
In most vehicles with rear drum brakes, two emergency brake/parking brake cables actuate the brake drums mechanically, but with much less force than is available through the primary hydraulic brake system. It is common for this type of system to work well when facing downhill but be unable to hold the vehicle stopped without using wheel chocks when facing up a steep hill. An improvement over stock parking brakes is useful for off-road vehicles such as tractors, tow trucks, 4x4's, construction vehicles or any drum brake vehicle on ice or steep terrain. Some manufactures use a transmission brake which locks the entire drivetrain.

In order to park by using the primary hydraulic brakes, a hand-operated valve is added to lock hydraulic pressure in the brake line. For parking using the brakes on all four wheels, two valves may be necessary. Any leakage at the brake cylinders will reduce pressure in the line and release the brakes. For this reason, line locks should only be used temporarily. Parking brakes using disc brakes do not have the same issues as drum brakes, but a vehicle needing parking brakes on all four wheels will still benefit from line locks.

== See also ==
- Transbrake
