= Lancia Dialfa =

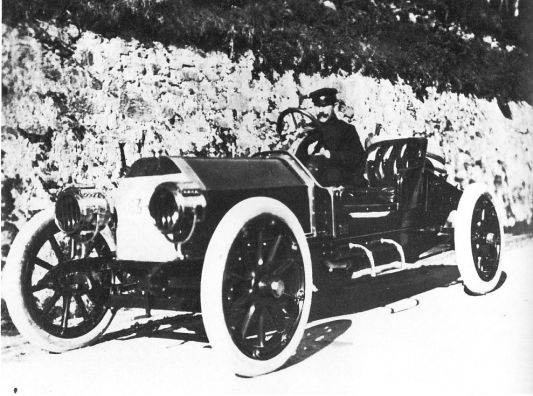

Overview
- Manufacturer: Lancia
- Also called: Lancia Dialfa-18HP
- Production: 1908

Body and chassis
- Body style: 4-door cabriolet
- Layout: FR layout

Powertrain
- Engine: 3815 cc straight-6 40 hp
- Transmission: 4-speed manual

Dimensions
- Wheelbase: 324 cm (127.6 in)
- Curb weight: 750 kg (1,653 lb)

Chronology
- Successor: Lancia Beta

The Lancia 18/24 HP Dialfa was the second model built by Lancia, produced in 1908. The car was based on the four cylinder Lancia Alfa, now with a straight-6 engine. With 40 hp, it could achieve a top speed of 110 km/h (68 mph). Only 23 examples were built, all in 1908.
