= Lancia Esagamma =

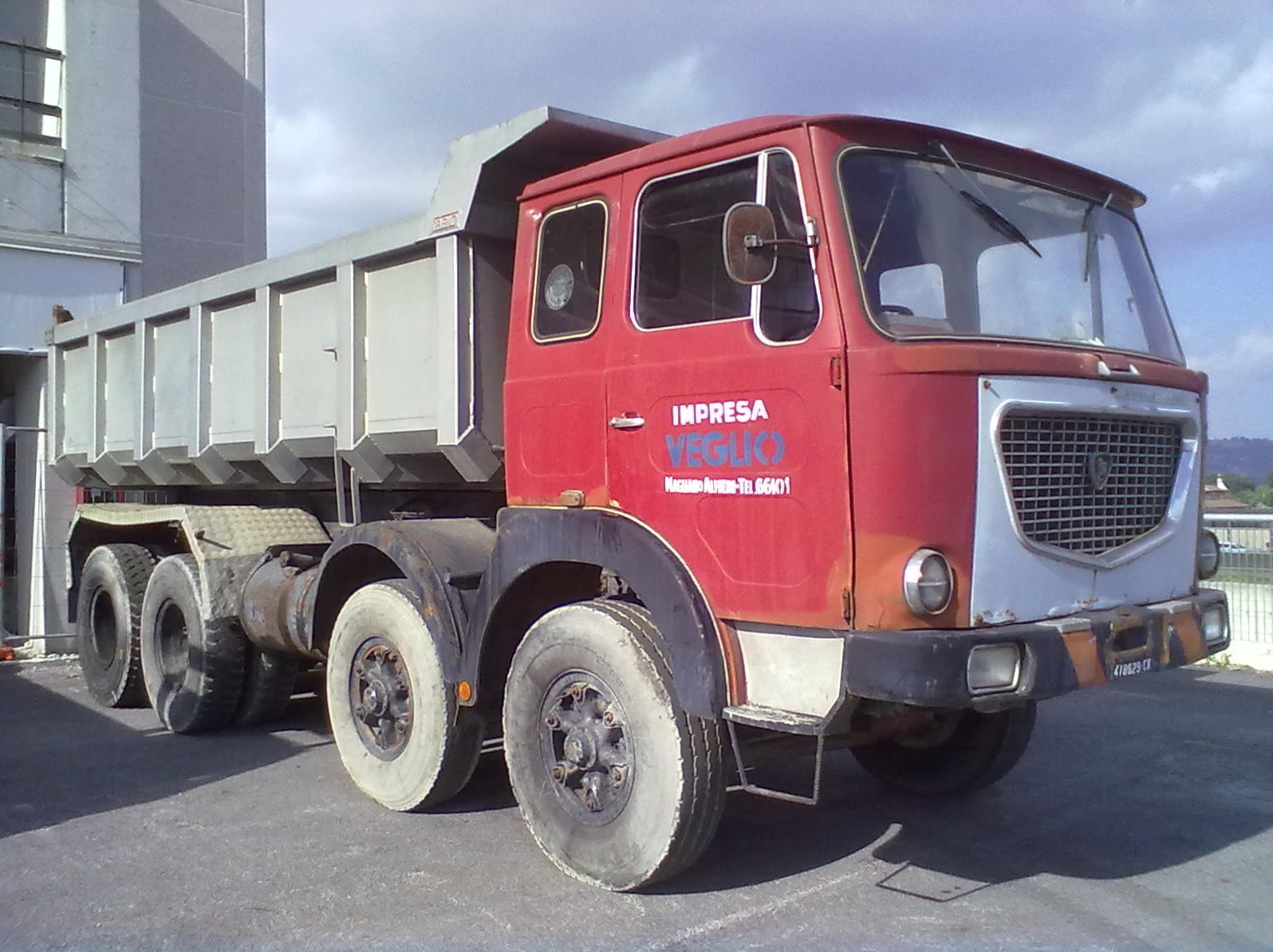

Lancia Esagamma is a truck and bus chassis produced by Italian car manufacturer Lancia from 1962 to 1973.

== Trucks ==
A total of 6,648 Esagamma trucks were built from 1962 to 1971. The truck uses in the engine parts from aluminum. They are from 6 cylinders and had 187 to 228 hp. Lancia Esagamma can carry from 19 to 44 t (with trailer). The truck was used in Italy for commercial needs and building industry.

Lancia Esagamma was distributed for countries like: France, UK, Germany, Austria, Belgium, Greece, Netherlands, Slovenia, Iran and other countries.

=== Versions ===
- 516
- 519
- 520

== Buses ==
=== Lancia Esatau 703 ===
The first bus, the 703, was produced in from 1960 to 1964. It was built with bodies from Viberti, Pistoiesi and SEAT-Casaro. Around 220 units were built by Pistoiesi. It had engine with 150 hp.

=== Lancia Esatau 703-08 ===
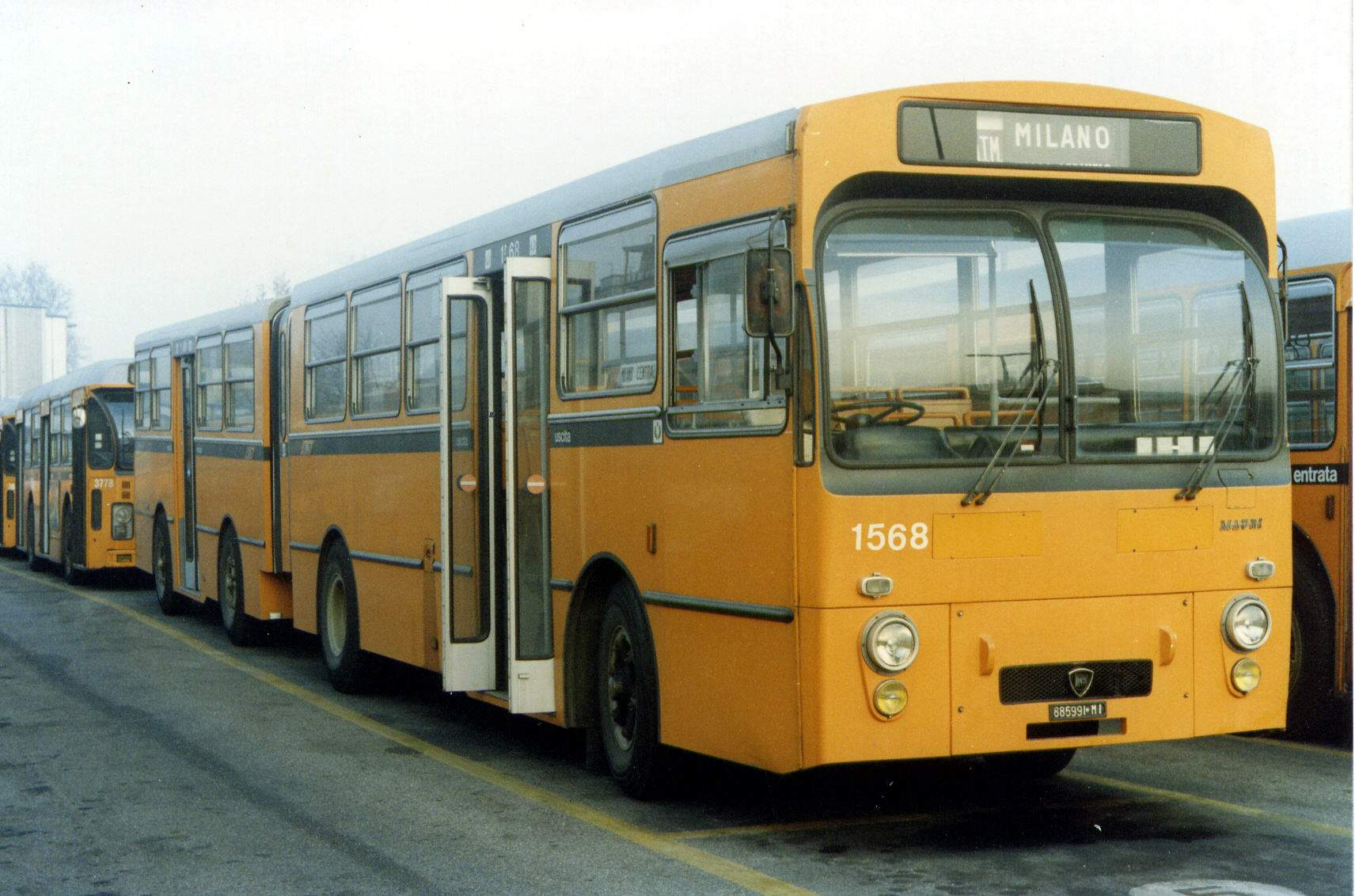
Lancia Esatau articulated 703 Mauri

The Lancia Esatau 703-08, sometimes called Mauri after its coach builder, was produced from 1973 to 1980. This special four-axle articulated bus version was produced for Milan, and was the first Italian aluminium bus.

=== Lancia Esagamma 715 ===
The Lancia Esagamma 715 model is a bus for transporting people over long distances. It was produced from 1965 to 1970. The bus has two doors, one in the front and one in the back, and uses a body built by Carrozzeria Bianchi. The bus has a capacity of 42 places.

=== Lancia Esagamma 718 ===
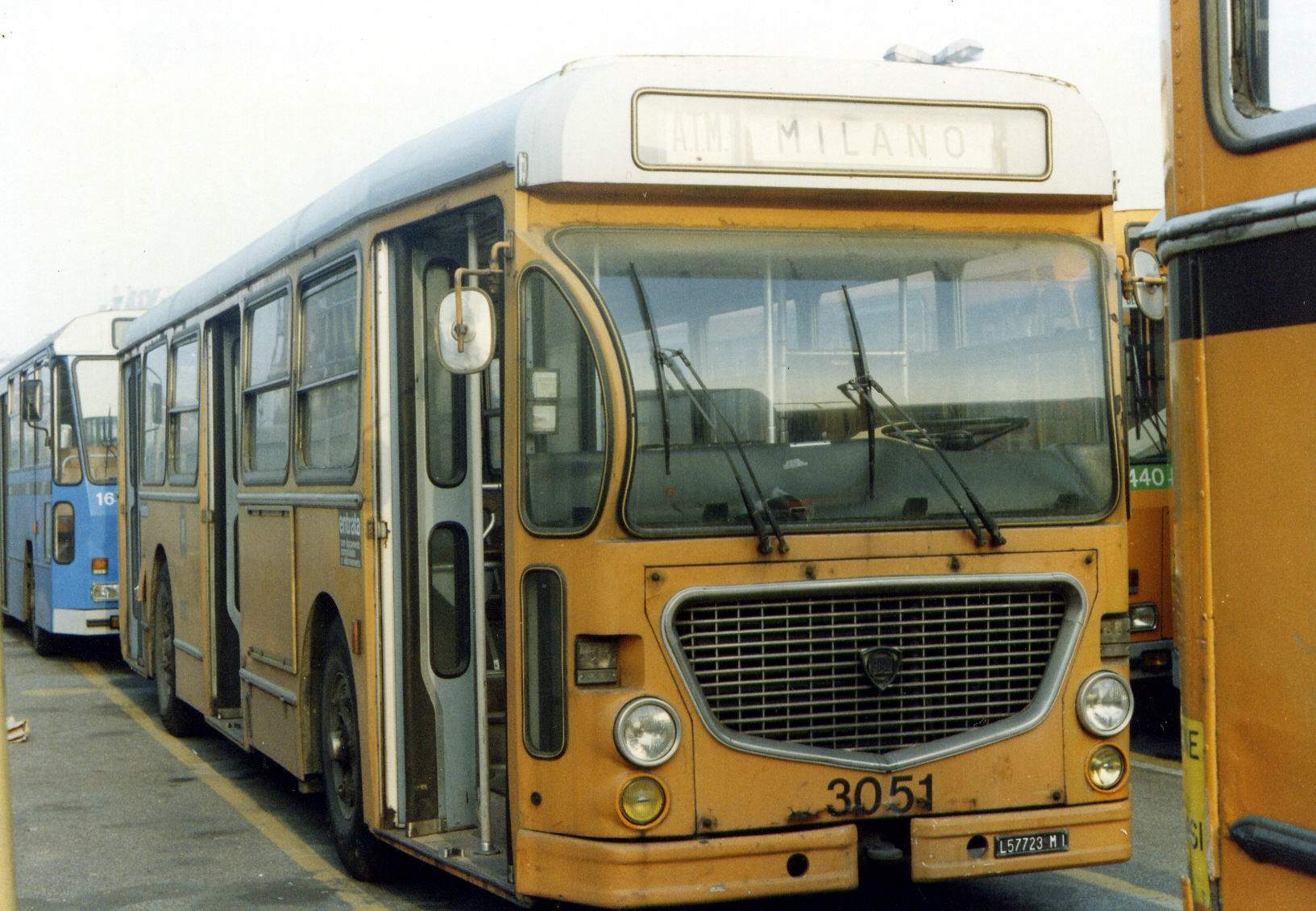
Lancia Esagamma 718

The 718 were produced from 1973 to 1974, with 200 built.

=== Engines ===
- 197HP
- 207HP
- 209HP
- 228HP
