= Lancia Alfa =

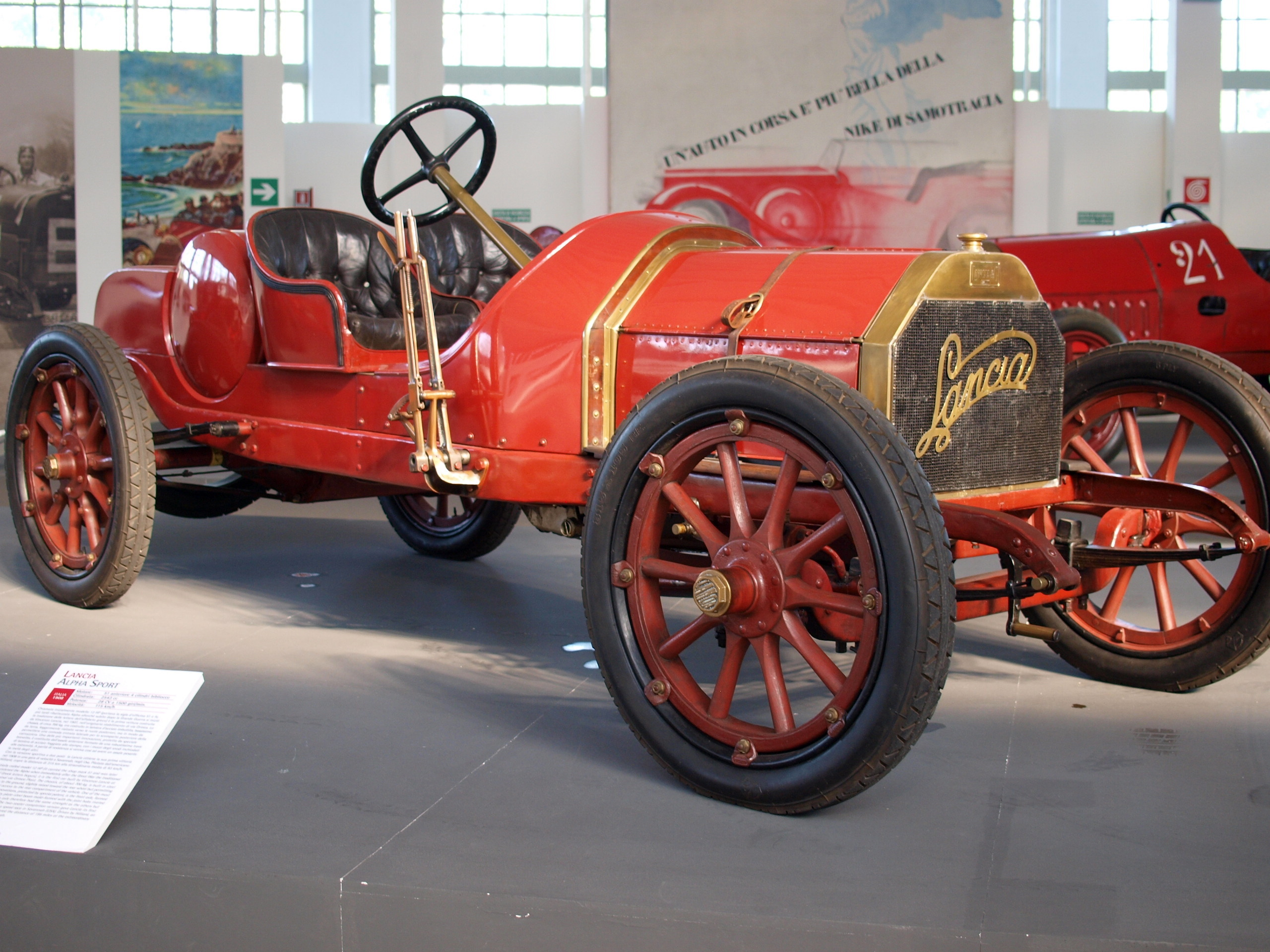
- Lancia Alfa Sport 1908

Overview
- Manufacturer: Lancia
- Also called: Lancia Alfa 12 HP
- Production: 1908

Body and chassis
- Body style: bare chassis double-phaeton luxury coupe landaulet limousine
- Layout: FR layout

Powertrain
- Engine: 2544 cc straight-4 28 hp
- Transmission: 4-speed manual

Dimensions
- Wheelbase: 282 cm (111.0 in)
- Curb weight: 700 kg (1,543 lb)

Chronology
- Successor: Lancia Beta-15/20HP

The Lancia Alfa 12 HP (Tipo 51 originally) was the first car made by Lancia.

The car had originally project name "type 51" and was later renamed to Greek alphabet Alfa.

== Description ==
The cars first road tests begun in September 1907 and production started in 1908. Vincenzo Lancia unveiled his first car in Turin Motor Show in 1908 (January 18-February 2) .

The car was equipped with sidevalve straight-4 engine. The car had top speed of around 90 kilometres per hour (56 mph) with 2544 cc engine producing 28 hp and rotating around 1800 revolutions per minute.

This model was sold over one hundred copies, car was also made for racing.
