= Transbrake =

Mechanism in drag racing

In drag racing, a transbrake is a mechanism that selectively places the transmission in a forward and reverse gear simultaneously. This allows the engine to create full power without transmitting that power through the driveline, allowing the car to stay in one place.

Historically this was done with a modified valvebody and a single solenoid along with some internal transmission modifications, like increasing line pressure, and removing engine braking band and beefing up internal components to withstand the harsh launches, the valvebody and solenoid when activated allows hydraulic fluid to engage both forward and reverse simultaneously when voltage is applied by the driver with a momentary button, on many ECU controlled vehicles, this is usually done with an electronic control solenoid used to send the ECU, and TCM a directive signal. The ECU will be given a RPM limit, type of limit, and safety parameters (such as a time limit or knock sensor limit). The TCM will also be given a directive to "Bump" or "Creep". Bumping is when the transmission releases all the pressure on the reverse gear for a specified amount of time, allowing the car to "bump" forward. "Creep" is allowing the transmission to release some of the pressure for the duration of the time the driver holds the Secondary button. This also requires the use of a modified valve body inside the transmission allowing the pressure to be redirected to two gears instead of one.

Transbrakes are becoming popular in street driven enthusiast vehicles due to the sound and have been popularized by the increasing use in street racing.

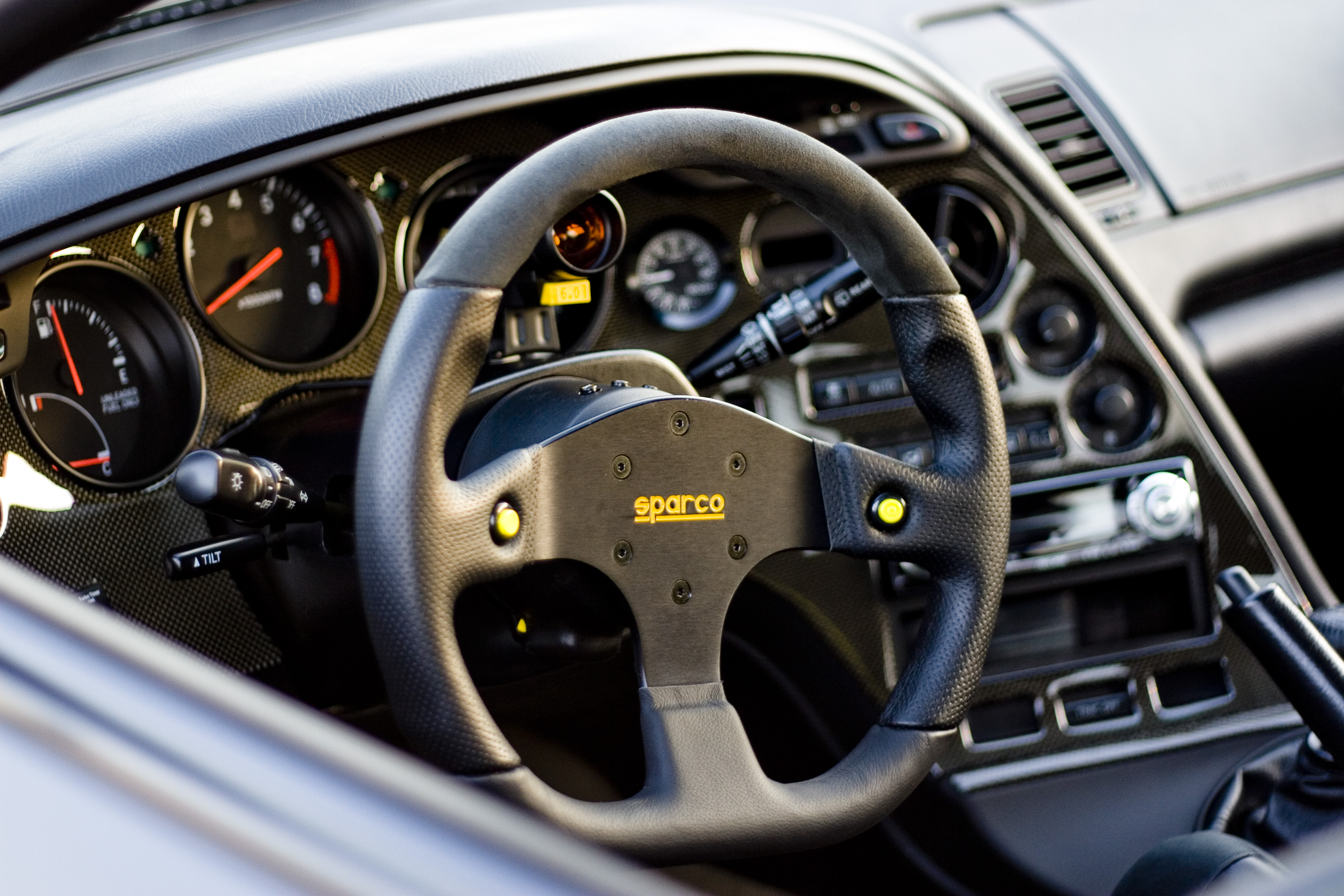
Steering wheel with transbrake button

The use of a transbrake can cause premature failure of transmission gears due to the pressure applied.

Transbrakes are often used as a part of a "launch control" system.
