= Lancia Esatau =

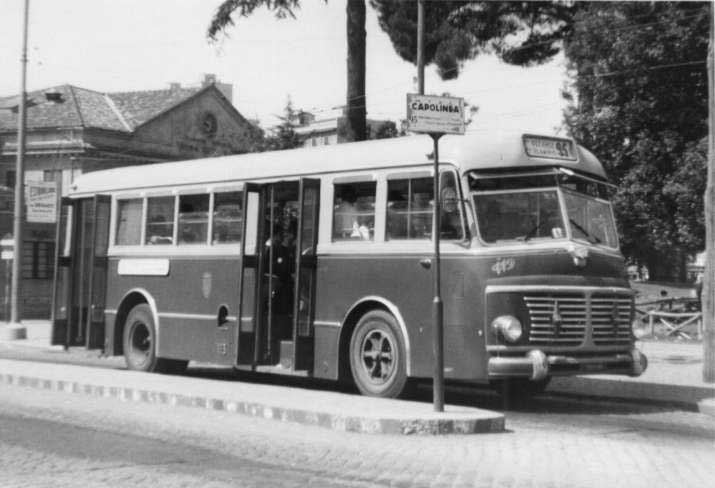
- Esatau bus

Overview
- Manufacturer: Lancia Industrial Vehicles
- Production: 1947–1973

Powertrain
- Engine: 8245 cc Tipo 864M diesel I6; 8867 cc Tipo 864M diesel I6

Dimensions
- Wheelbase: 4.3 m (169 in); 5 m (197 in)

Chronology
- Successor: Lancia Esagamma

Lancia Esatau is a series of truck and bus chassis produced by Italian manufacturer Lancia Industrial Vehicles from 1947 to 1973. 13,362 examples were produced.

== Trucks ==
Lancia Esatau truck chassis were produced from 1947 to 1963, when the model was replaced by the Lancia Esagamma. The first version was called Esatau 864, which was a 4×2 chassis. The Esatau 964, in a 6×2 configuration, was introduced the following year. The engine was an 8245 cc overhead-cam inline six diesel producing 122 horsepower (91 kW) at 2000 rpm. Displacement was increased to 8867 cc in 1953, raising output to 132 hp (98 kW).

The forward control Esatau A was introduced in 1955. The 864 and 964 were discontinued in 1957, the last conventional cab trucks built by Lancia.

The trucks were also used by the Italian army for transporting soldiers and army vehicles.

== Buses and trolleybuses ==
Lancia Esatau chassis for city buses remained in production from 1948 through 1973.

The bus was primarily used in Italy for public transport and it was produced in a small series. They were used in Rome, Milan and Turin. Trolley bus and articulated versions were also made. The trolley bus chassis was also sold to the STCP in Porto, Portugal, who had these bodied by local coach builders Dalva. Two versions, single and double decker, were used and were in serviced until the early 90's where the city shutdown the trolley bus service.

=== Lancia Esatau V.10 ===
The Lancia Esatau V.10 was in production from 1948 to 1953. It had an engine of 122HP.

=== Lancia Esatau V.11 ===
The V.11 was manufactured from 1951 to 1952, with the body from Garavini. It was powered by a Lancia V10 engine, producing 122 bhp (91 kW). In the side of the doors the seats are double. The city bus version was 10,500 mm (413.4 in) long, and a suburban version was 11,000 mm (433.1 in) long. A total of 52 were produced.

A 12,000 mm (472.4 in) trolleybus version was built for Athens in Greece, with 46 in service. The V.11 trolley bus version had two doors, and had capacity for 27 seated and 73 standing passengers. The V.11 was used in Athens from 1961 until 1991. The same trolleybuses was used in Florence and in Capua too.

=== Lancia Esatau V.81 ===
The Lancia Esatau V.81 was produced from 1953 to 1959. Most bodies were made by Viberti, with the last 23 by Pistoiesi. A total of 183 were built. The V.81 came in two lengths, the Lancia PV81 powered version (with 130 bhp (97 kW)) at 10,400 mm (409.4 in) long and the Lancia V10 powered version 11,000 mm (433.1 in) long. The V10 originally produced 138 bhp (103 kW) and from 1957 144 bhp (107 kW).

The weight of a Lancia Esatau V.81 is 9,3 tonnes. The bus had 18 seats and space for an additional 30 standing passengers.
