= Parking brake =

Secondary automotive braking system

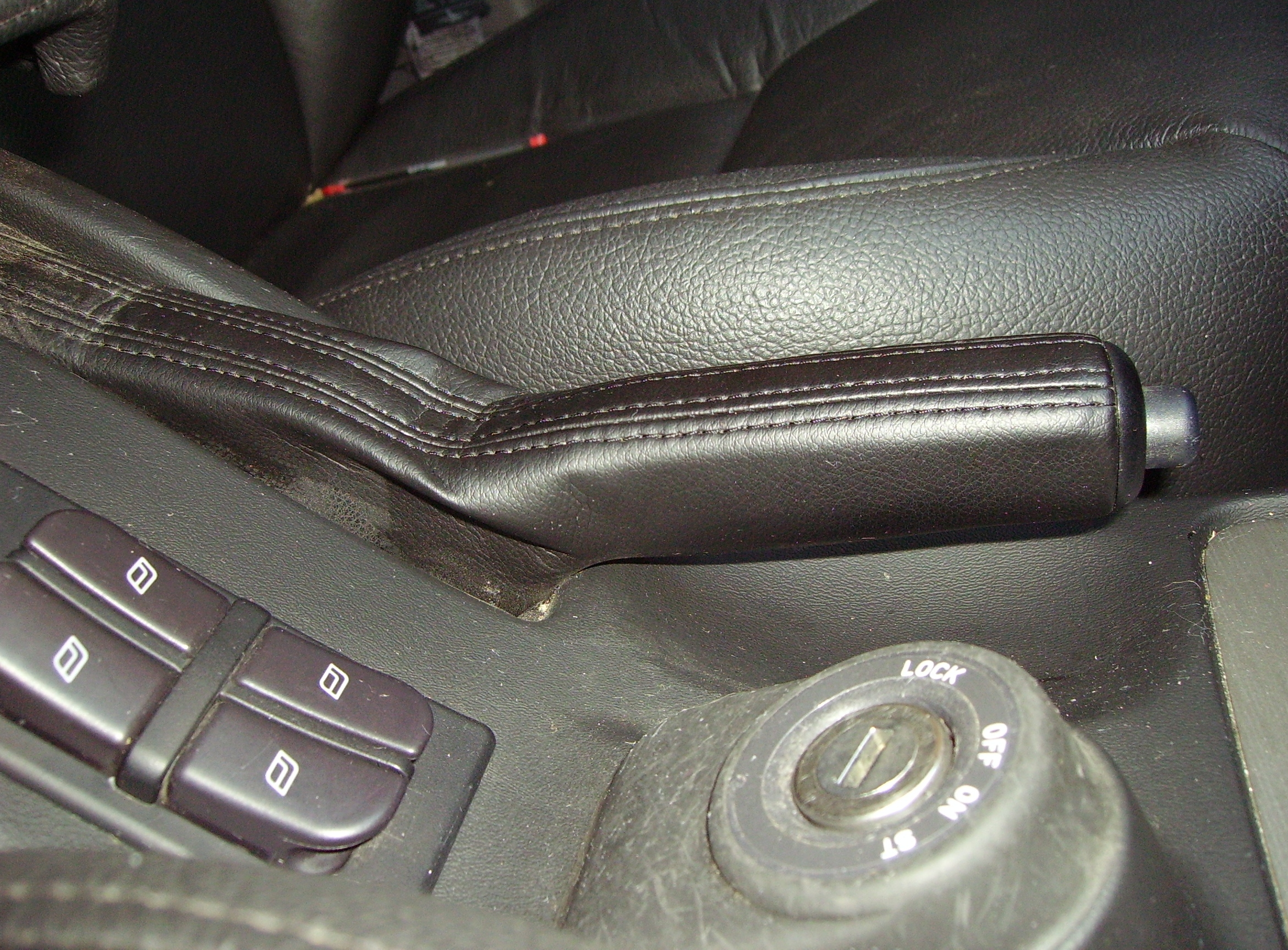
Parking brake lever from a Saab 9-5

In a motor vehicle, the parking brake, also known as an emergency brake (e-brake) or handbrake, is a braking mechanism often used to keep the vehicle securely motionless while parked or to attempt to stop the vehicle in an emergency. Parking brakes often consist of a pulling mechanism attached to a cable which is connected to two wheel brakes. In most vehicles, the parking brake operates only on the rear wheels, which have reduced traction while braking. The mechanism may be a hand-operated lever (a hand brake), a straight pull handle located near the steering column, or a foot-operated pedal located with the other pedals.

== Overview ==
In manual transmission vehicles, the parking brake is engaged to help keep the vehicle stationary while parked, especially if parked on an incline. As an extra precaution, some drivers may also put their car in gear (either in first or reverse) in case the parking brake fails.

While automatic transmission vehicles have a "Park" gear with a parking pawl that immobilizes the transmission, it is still recommended to use the parking brake, as the pawl in the gearbox could fail due to stress or another vehicle striking the car, causing it to roll.

When parking on an uphill gradient, it is recommended that the front wheels face away from the curb. This would prevent the car from rolling into the roadway by using the curb to block the front passenger tire in the event of a parking brake failure. Similarly, on a downhill gradient, the front wheels should face the curb for the same reason, and the wheels should face to the side of the road on which vehicles are driven on an uncurbed road regardless of orientation. In a manual transmission, leaving the car in first gear (or in reverse if pointing downhill) is also advised, as the engine will prevent the car from rolling if the parking brake fails.

Most parking brake systems are still completely mechanical. Traditionally engaged by pulling a lever or pushing a button, the cables manually engage part of the car's braking system. The mechanical nature allows the driver to apply the brake even if the main hydraulic brake system fails.

Pictograph symbols and/or lights may be used to indicate the location of a parking brake, its application or release.

=== Other uses ===
In manual and automatic transmission vehicles, the parking brake can also be used for various driving situations which require the vehicle to be momentarily stopped. For example, the brake can be engaged when moving off an uphill slope, as this allows the driver to hold the accelerator and clutch pedals steady without the vehicle rolling backwards. Other common situations is when the vehicle is stopped at a traffic light, a pedestrian crossing, or simply waiting to turn in front of oncoming traffic. The parking brake would ensure the car is secure, should another vehicle come into physical contact from behind, causing the car to jolt forward. It is not recommended to use the parking brake when the vehicle is in-motion, unless there is a problem with the main brakes, as this can lock the back wheels and cause a skid. This is known as a handbrake turn, which is often performed in street racing and rallying to initiate rear wheel drift.

In the event of hydraulic brake failure, the parking brake can be used to slow a vehicle. In such cases, the lever should be slowly engaged to prevent locking up the wheels.

== Parking brake variations ==
ISO symbol used to indicate that the parking brake is applied

The position of the parking brake differs between vehicle models and manufacturers. However, a universal feature is either one or two of the warning lights which appear on the dashboard when the parking brake is engaged.

Brake warning light, used in vehicles without dedicated parking brake light

=== Center or stick lever ===
The most common placement of the parking brake is in the center console of the vehicle, in between the driver and front passenger seats. Operating the brake is performed by pulling the lever up (which is connected to a ratchet) until there is tension. To disengage the brake, the button is held while simultaneously pulling the lever up to disengage the ratchet and then pushed all the way down with the button still held. In older vehicle models, a stick lever may be used instead which is located under the instrument panel.

=== Pedal or pull handle ===
Some vehicles have the parking brake operated by a small foot pedal, located by the other pedals. Depressing the foot pedal would engage the brake and pressing it again will release it. A pull handle variation also exists; by pulling or releasing the handle, this engages and releases the parking brake, respectively. Many vehicles have a combination of the two: a pedal to engage the brake and a handle to release it.

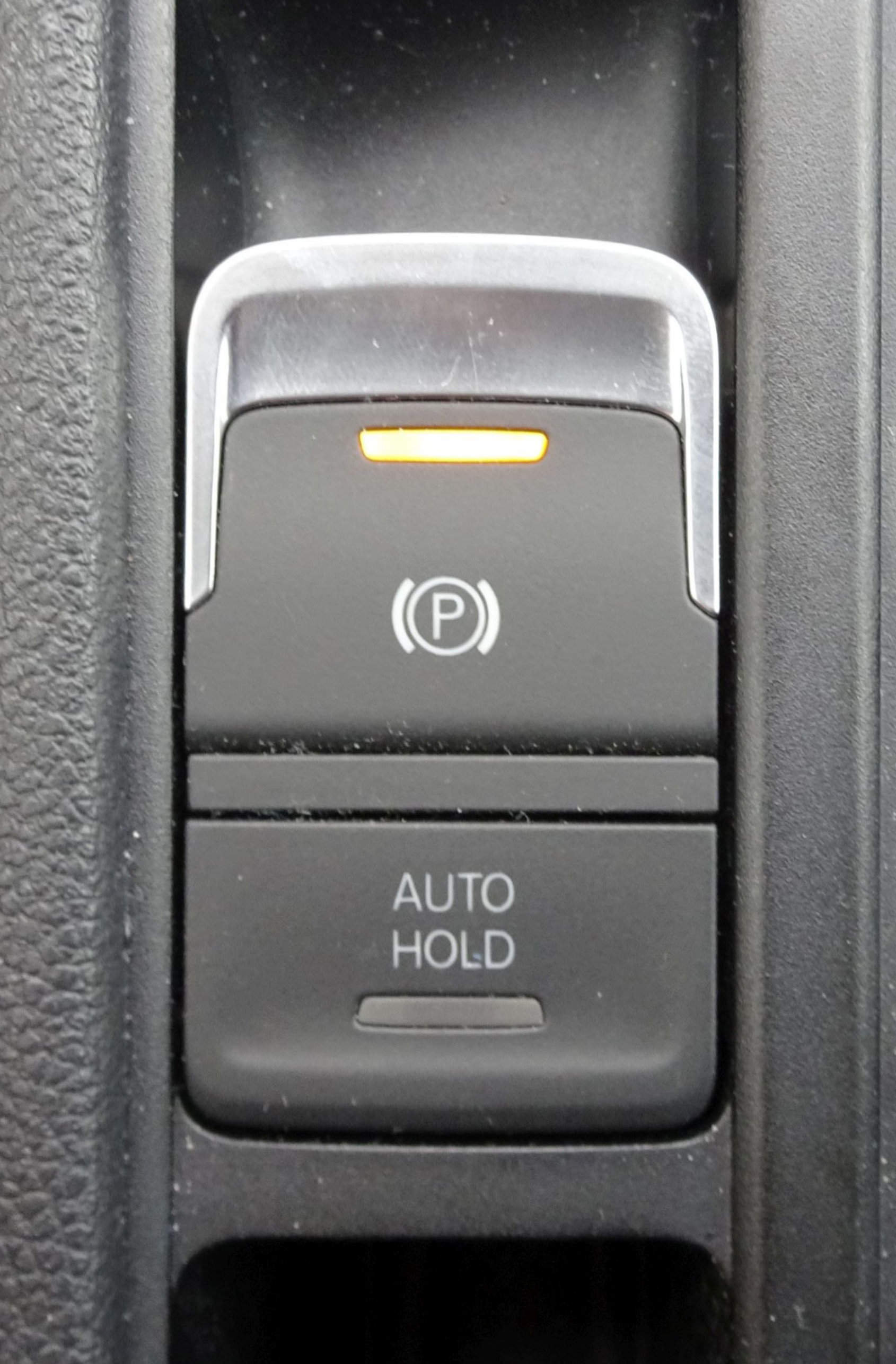
Electric park brake on a Volkswagen Touran

=== Electronic ===
A recent development is the electronic parking brake, also known as an electric park brake. Introduced to the mainstream market in 2001, it was first used in the 2001 BMW 7 Series (E65). Two variations are available: In the more-traditional "cable-pulling" type, an electric motor simply pulls the parking brake cable on the push or pull of a button rather than a mechanical lever or pedal in the cabin. A more complex unit (first seen on the 2003 Audi A8) uses a computer-controlled motor attached to each of the two rear brake calipers referred to as the Motor on Caliper (MoC) system.

Many car manufacturers such as Jaguar, Land Rover, BMW, Renault, Subaru and Volkswagen sell models whereby the parking brake automatically engages when the vehicle is stopped and is released when the gas pedal is pressed, eliminating the need for the driver to operate a button. An extension of this system, known as hill-hold or hill-assist, prevents the vehicle from rolling back when preparing to drive away on an uphill gradient.

== Types of brakes ==
In vehicles with rear disc brakes, the parking brake either actuates the disc calipers (with much less force) or a small drum brake housed within the hub assembly (the inner circumference of the disc is often used instead of a separate drum). This secondary drum parking brake is often referred to as a banksia brake. It is usually used in conjunction with rear disc brakes employing multi-piston calipers, as mechanically actuating these calipers is more difficult than single piston calipers.

Another less common setup for rear discs is the use of a separate, smaller, cable actuated caliper (such as the Wilwood MC4), which is used exclusively for the parking brake. This is sometimes used as an alternative to a separate drum parking brake when multi-piston main calipers are used.

Hudson automobiles used an unusual hybrid hydraulic-mechanical dual-brake system which operated the rear brakes through the otherwise conventional mechanical parking brake system when a failure of the hydraulic system allowed the pedal to travel beyond its normal limit.

A number of production vehicles, light and medium duty trucks, and motor homes have been made with a separate drum brake on the driveline; called a transmission brake. This has an advantage of being completely independent of other braking systems. This is effective when there are multiple driving axles: all driven wheels are braked at once.

A line lock is a temporary parking brake that makes use of the vehicles standard hydraulic brakes. They are often used for off-road conditions or when stopping on steep grades is required. By trapping hydraulic pressure in the brake lines, all four wheels can be locked.

== Large vehicles ==
Large vehicles are usually fitted with power operated or power assisted parking brakes. Power assisted parking brakes are usually found on large vans as well as some older heavy vehicles. These operate in the same way as a conventional parking brakes, but pulling the lever operates a valve that allows air or hydraulic pressure or vacuum into a cylinder which applies force to the brake shoes and makes applying the parking brake easier. When releasing the parking brake, the same mechanism also provides assistance to the driver in disengaging the ratchet. Particularly on commercial vehicles with air operated brakes, this has the added benefit of making it much harder or even impossible to release the parking brake when insufficient air pressure is available to operate the brakes. A reservoir or accumulator is usually provided so a limited amount of power assistance is available with the engine off.

Power operated parking brakes are fitted to heavy commercial vehicles with air brakes, such as trucks and buses. These are usually spring applied, with air pressure being used to hold the brake off and powerful springs holding the brakes on. In most cases, a small lever in the cab is connected to a valve which can admit air to the parking brake cylinders to release the parking brake, or release the air to apply the brake. On some modern vehicles the valve is operated electrically from a lever or button in the cab. The system is relatively safe since if air pressure is lost the springs will apply the brakes. Also, the system prevents the parking brake being released if there is insufficient air pressure to apply the foot brake. A disadvantage to this system is that if a vehicle requires towing and cannot provide its own air supply, an external supply must be provided to allow the parking brake to be released, or the brake shoes must be manually wound off against the springs.

== Railroad hand brakes ==
Virtually all railroad rolling stock is equipped with manually operated mechanical hand brake devices that set and release the brakes. Most of these involve a chain linked to the brake rigging, most often at the brake cylinder, that when tightened pull the piston out against the releasing springs, thus applying the brakes on the car (if there is only one brake cylinder per car) or bogie (if there is more than one cylinder per car). Newer locomotives have electric systems that simply place an electric motor in place of the chain winding mechanism. This brake acts independently of the action of the automatic air brakes, which function collectively when coupled in a train and are under the control of the locomotive driver / engineer.

Manual hand brakes serve to keep a piece of rolling stock stationary after it has been spotted in a rail yard or at a customer for unloading or loading. They are also used to secure a parked train from inadvertent movement, especially while unmanned.

Before the development of locomotive-actuated train braking systems in the late 19th century, American railroads employed brakemen to move about the tops of cars, setting hand brakes on the engineer's signal in an effort to stop the train in a timely manner. This process was imprecise and extremely dangerous. Many brakemen lost life and limb as a result of falling from a moving train, icy and wet conditions often adding to the hazards involved in negotiating the top of a swaying boxcar. In the U.S., an 1893 federal law, the Railroad Safety Appliance Act, required automatic brakes on all railroads, effective in 1900.

== See also ==
- Handbrake turn
- Johnson bar (vehicle)
- List of auto parts
