= Transmission brake =

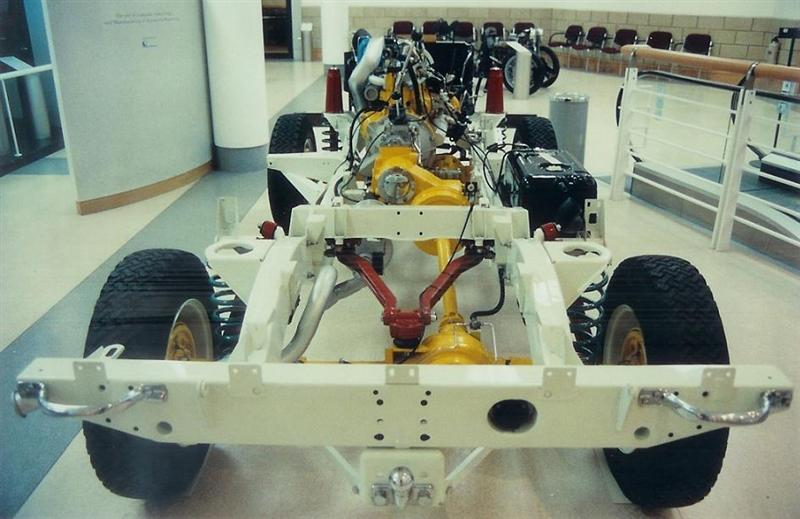
Land Rover 90 rolling chassis, with drivetrain painted yellow. The transmission brake is the yellow drum, to the right rear of the transfer box.

A transmission brake or driveline parking brake is an inboard vehicle brake that is applied to the drivetrain rather than to the wheels.

Historically, some early cars used transmission brakes as the normal driving brake and often had wheel brakes on only one axle, if that. In current vehicles, these brakes are now rare. They are found in some makes, notably Land Rover, usually for light off-road vehicles. Simple transmission brakes could be found in large vehicles too, such as the 16 inch single disc parking brake used in the M19 tank transporter of World War II. Such a system was also used on the HMMWV.

The transmission brake is provided solely as a parking brake or handbrake. Normal wheel brakes are still provided for use when driving. Driver's manuals usually caution against using the transmission brake when driving, as it is neither powerful enough nor robust enough and so will not work effectively and may even be damaged by trying to stop a moving vehicle.

Transmission brakes use drum brakes, rather than disc brakes, as they are intended as a static parking brake, rather than a high performance dynamic brake. Drum brakes allow simpler adjustment with cable-actuated hand lever mechanisms. The brake is mounted to the rear output shaft of the transfer box.

As the transmission brake is mounted inboard of the final drive and its reduction gearing, the brake rotates relatively faster, but with less torque, than a wheel brake. The apparently undersized transmission brake thus has more holding ability than its small size might suggest, but is less suitable for driving loads. The braking forces would also be passed through the final drive and axle drive shafts, with possible risk of overloading them. (Note: Inboard brakes generally place extra torque on the drive shafts, which must be adequately specified to cope with it, but not the final drive.)

One advantage of a transmission brake is that it locks the entire drivetrain, including all four wheels of a four wheel drive vehicle. However any differential action, either within an axle or front-to-back on an all wheel drive (permanent 4×4) vehicle can still allow movement. For this reason a transmission brake is convenient as a parking brake, but should not be relied upon if a mechanic is to be working beneath the vehicle and wheel chocks should be used instead. A second advantage is that they remove the need to provide cable connections to the wheel brakes, on off-road vehicles where such may be prone to damage.

== Automatic transmissions ==
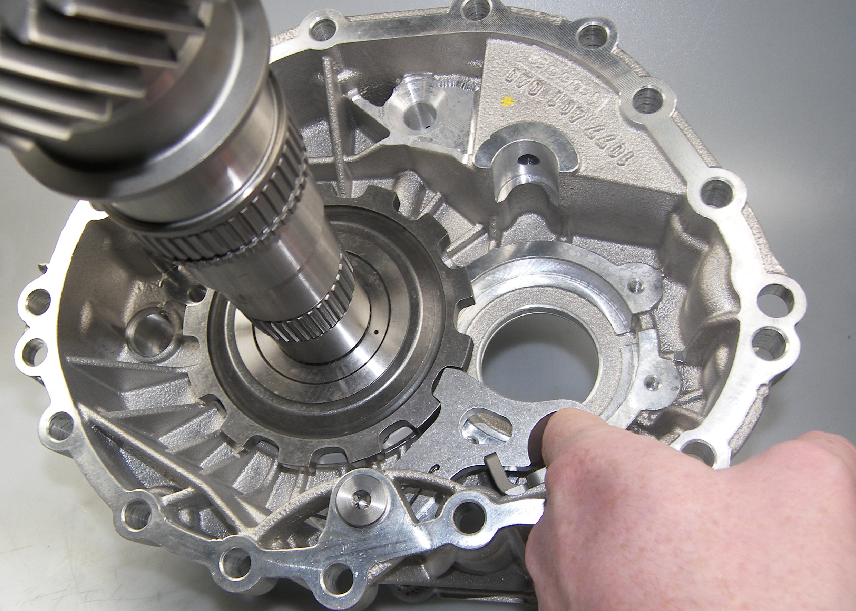
Pawl transmission brake, inside an automatic transmission

A form of transmission brake is commonly fitted to automatic transmissions. These brakes use a dog clutch or pawl system, rather than friction linings. They thus provide a simple and positive lock when stationary, but cannot (or at least, should not) be engaged when moving.

In the US, this is the conventional form of parking brake and leads to the handbrake being almost entirely ignored and thought of only as the 'emergency' brake.

== See also ==
- Transbrake
- Line lock
