= Lancia Theta =

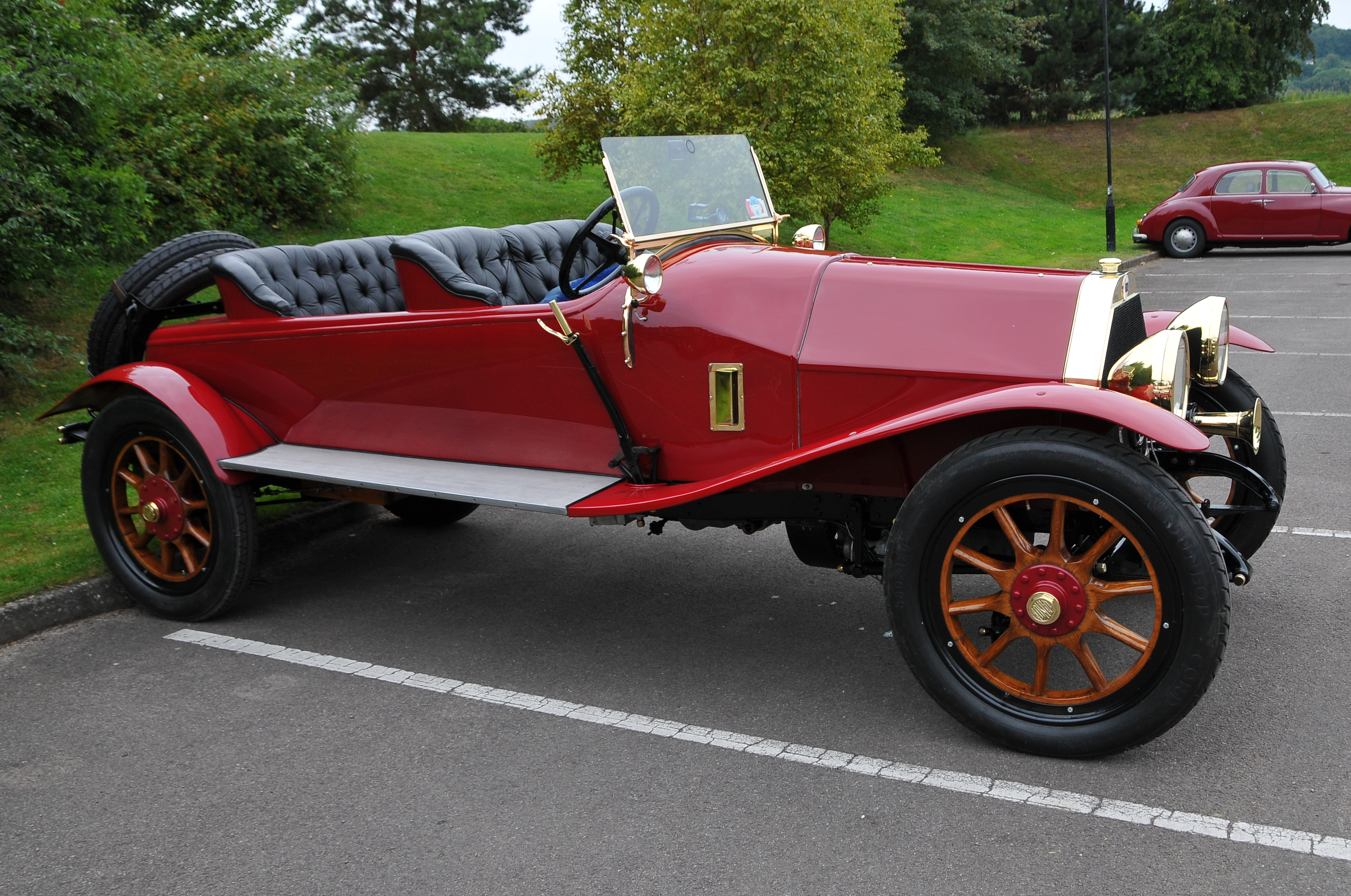
- 1917 Lancia Theta Torpedo

Overview
- Manufacturer: Lancia
- Also called: Lancia Theta-35HP
- Production: 1913–1918

Body and chassis
- Body style: Torpedo
- Layout: FR layout

Powertrain
- Engine: 4941.72 cc sidevalve I4
- Transmission: 4-speed manual gearbox

Dimensions
- Wheelbase: 310 cm (122.0 in); 337 cm (132.7 in) (long version)
- Length: 465 cm (183.1 in); 500 cm (196.9 in) (long version)
- Width: 161.5 cm (63.6 in); 161.9 cm (63.7 in) (long version)
- Curb weight: 1,060 kg (2,337 lb)

Chronology
- Predecessor: Lancia Epsilon
- Successor: Lancia Kappa

The Lancia Theta (25/35 HP, type 61) is a car which was produced between 1913 and 1918 by Lancia. The car was a bigger version of the Epsilon model. It had electrical lights and a start motor. 1,636 Theta cars were built.

Lancia Theta Coloniale
