= Fratelli Fabbri Editori =

Italian publishing house

- Logo
- Parent company: Rizzoli Libri
- Founded: 1947
- Founder: Giovanni, Dino and Ettore 'Rino' Fabbri
- Country of origin: Italy
- Publication types: Books
- Official website: fabbrieditori.rizzolilibri.it

Fratelli Fabbri Editori is an Italian publishing house founded in 1947 by the brothers Giovanni, Dino and Ettore 'Rino' Fabbri. Today Fabbri forms part of Rizzoli Libri, which in turn is 100% controlled by Arnoldo Mondadori Editore

== Origins ==
Coming from a family of small bourgeois merchants Forlivesi, the brothers Fabbri started with little more than a love for art and culture inherited from their father Ottavio Fabbri.

The eldest, Giovanni, after graduating from medical school, joined the partisans of the Val d'Ossola. After the war, preferring books to medicine, he became an editor, and involved his brothers.

The Fratelli Fabbri Editori found immediate success printing text books for schools and, later, became the leading publisher in this area. They took a leap in the quality of printing to publish regular, large classical works such as the Divine Comedy and the Bible. The approval of the public encouraged them, and at the end of the 1950s remain in the history of publishing with works such as Masterpieces in the Centuries and, particularly, The Masters of Color (I Maestri del Colore).

== 1960s ==
In the 1960s Fratelli Fabbri Editori published Conoscere, an illustrated encyclopedia for children that entered the homes of millions of Italians. The encyclopedia was sold in bound volumes, with payment by installments. During those years, the publishing house sold approximately a billion and a half books, published in dozens of countries with translations into 14 languages, including Hindi, Urdu, Afrikaans, Turkish and Bulgarian.

They were also the first Italian publisher to market multimedia products; producing the new series The Stories of Sound and The History of Music, which combines a book and record, addressing issues unknown at the time. For example, for The History of Music in order to fall within the standard packaging industry, they commissioned Philips Records to produce 10 million of a special LP with a diameter of 20 centimeters.

Towards the end of the 1960s, due to the saturation of the market and social unrest, the brothers Dino and Rino sold their shares to engage in other activities abroad, thwarted by the refusal of the elder brother.

== 1970s ==
In 1971 the Istituto Finanziario Industriale (IFI; predecessor of Exor) purchased 53% of the shares of Fabbri Editori on behalf of the Agnelli family from Bertelsmann. Dino and Rino relocated abroad, but Giovanni remained on as chairman; the operational role was entrusted to Piero Stucchi Prinetti, acting as managing director.

Towards the end of the 1970s Giovanni Fabbri became a target of the Red Brigades and decided to move to Lugano, Switzerland, where he resides today. Rino Fabbri chose Paraguay. Dino Fabbri died following a long illness of ALS (amyotrophic lateral sclerosis) on 10 December 2001 at his home in Aventura, Florida. Ettore Rino Fabbri died in Asunción, November 2012.

== 1980s, 1990s and today ==
In the 1990s and 1990s Fabbri published partworks series which were designed for sale across the world (for example, the series Regards sur la Peinture, Entender la pintura, Malerei kennen und verstehen and Discovering the Great Paintings in the French, Spanish, German and English languages).

Fabbri Editori was part of Gruppo Rizzoli Corriere della Sera (now RCS MediaGroup) and continues to publish textbooks and publications. RCS' book businesses, including Fabbri, were acquired Arnoldo Mondadori Editore in 2016.

With the spread of home-video (especially with the arrival of the DVD) Fabbri concluded agreements that allow it to distribute through the network of kiosks a series of monographs on actors (such as the series of films of 007) and collections of the movies of Alberto Sordi and Gilberto Govi, directors and genres of film.
