= Lancia =

Automobile brand manufacturing subsidiary of Stellantis

Lancia Automobiles S.p.A.

- Palazzo Lancia, former company headquarters
- Type: Subsidiary
- Industry: Automotive
- Founded: 27 November 1906; 119 years ago
- Founder: Vincenzo Lancia
- Headquarters: Turin, Italy
- Area served: Italy; Belgium; Netherlands; France; Spain; Luxembourg
- Key people: John Elkann (chairman, Stellantis); Arnaud Belloni (CEO)
- Products: Automobile
- Production output: 32,000 (2024)
- Parent: Stellantis Europe
- Website: www.lancia.com

Lancia Automobiles S.p.A. (Italian: [ˈlantʃa]) is an Italian car manufacturer and a subsidiary of Stellantis Europe, which is the European subsidiary of Stellantis. The present legal entity of Lancia was formed in January 2007 when its corporate parent reorganised its businesses, but its history is traced back to Lancia & C., a manufacturing concern founded in 1906 in Turin by Vincenzo Lancia (1881–1937) and Claudio Fogolin. It became part of Fiat in 1969.

The brand is known for its strong rallying heritage, and technical innovations such as the unibody chassis of the 1922 Lambda and the five-speed gearbox introduced in the 1948 Ardea. Despite not competing in the World Rally Championship since 1992, Lancia still holds more Manufacturers' Championships than any other brand.

Sales of Lancia-branded vehicles declined from over 300,000 annual units sold in 1990 to less than 100,000 by 2010. After corporate parent Fiat acquired a stake in Chrysler in 2009, the Lancia brand portfolio was modified to include rebadged Chrysler products, for sale in most European markets. In the United Kingdom and Ireland however, Lancias were rebadged as Chryslers. As sales continued to drop the Lancia-badged Chryslers were no longer offered after 2015. Since then, the company's only product has been the Lancia Ypsilon, and sales outside of Italy ended in 2017. Despite Lancia's much smaller brand presence, the Ypsilon continues to be popular in Italy and managed to be the country's second best-selling car in 2019.

The newly merged Franco-Italian-American company Stellantis stated that it would try to revive Lancia, with the move also suggesting there would be more than one model for the brand, as well as sales outside of Italy for the first time in years.

== History ==
=== Foundation and early years ===
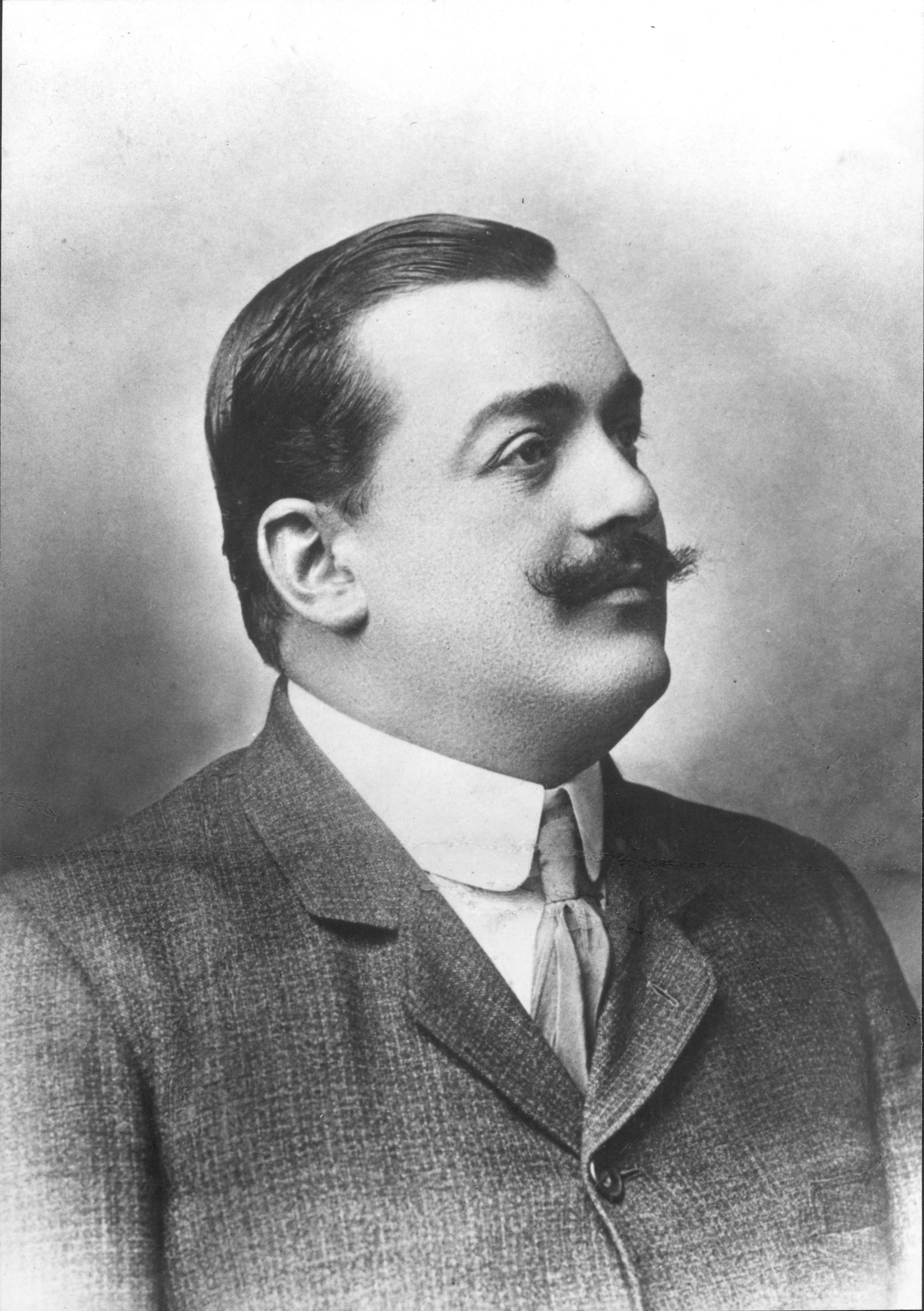
Vincenzo Lancia, automobile pioneer, racing driver, engineer and founder of Lancia

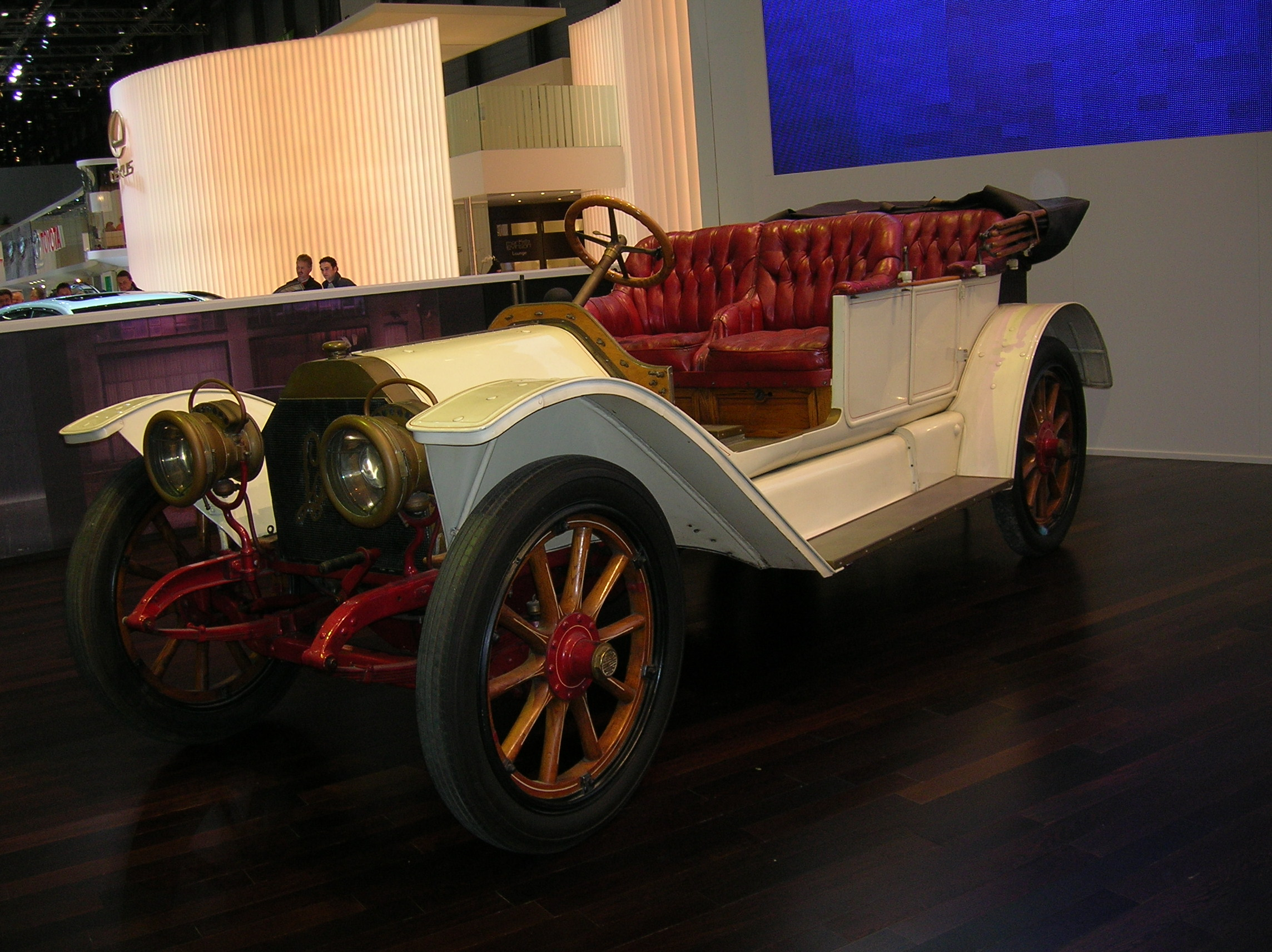
Lancia Beta Torpedo (1909)

Lancia & C. Fabbrica Automobili was founded on 27 November 1906 in Turin by Fiat racing drivers, Vincenzo Lancia and his friend, Claudio Fogolin. The first car manufactured by Lancia was the "Tipo 51" or "12 HP" (later called "Alfa"), which remained in production from 1907 to 1908. It had a small four-cylinder engine with a power output of 28 PS (21 kW; 28 hp).

In 1910, Lancia components were exported to the United States where they were assembled and sold as SGVs by the SGV Company. In 1915, Lancia also manufactured its first truck, the Jota, that continued as a dedicated series. In 1937, Vincenzo died of a heart attack. His wife, Adele Miglietti Lancia, and his son, Gianni Lancia, took over control of the company. They persuaded Vittorio Jano to join as an engineer. Jano had already made a name for himself by designing various Alfa Romeo models, including some of its most successful race cars ever such as the 6C, P2 and P3.

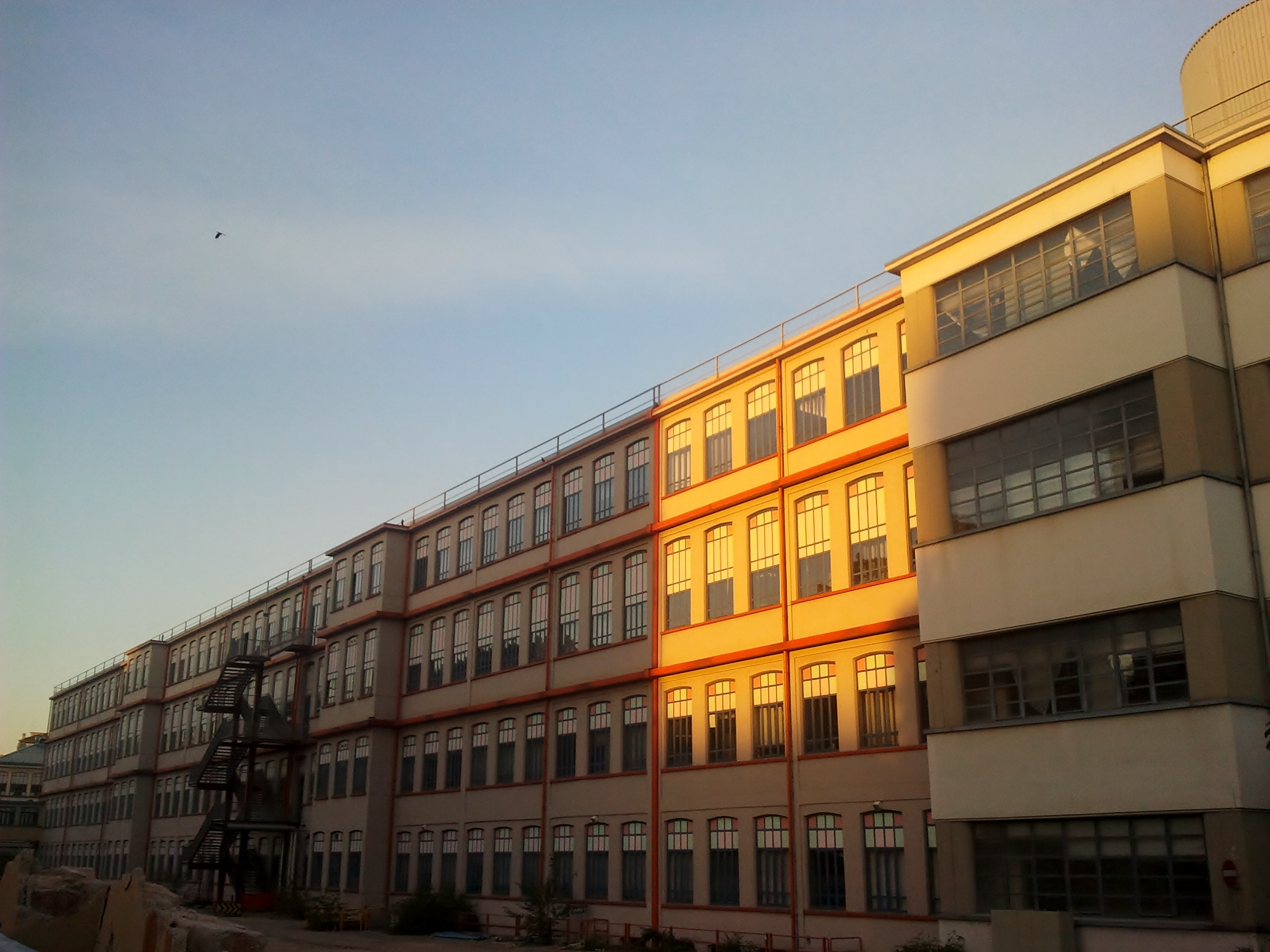
The former Lancia Borgo San Paolo Plant in Turin, where Lancia automobiles were first produced

Lancia is renowned in the automotive world for introducing cars with numerous innovations. These include the Theta of 1913, which was the first European production car to feature a complete electrical system as standard equipment. Lancia's first car adopting a monocoque chassis, the Lambda produced from 1922 to 1931, featured 'Sliding Pillar' independent front suspension that incorporated the spring and hydraulic damper into a single unit (a feature that would be employed in subsequent Lancias, up to the Appia that was replaced in 1963). In 1948, the first 5-speed gearbox was fitted to a production car (Series 3 Ardea). Lancia premiered the first full-production V6 engine, in the 1950 Aurelia, after earlier industry-leading experiments with V8 and V12 engine configurations. It was also the first manufacturer to produce a V4 engine. Other innovations involved the use of independent suspension in production cars (in an era where live axles were common practice for both the front and rear axles of a car), and rear transaxles, which were first fitted to the Aurelia and Flaminia range. This drive for innovation, constant quest for excellence, fixation of quality, complex construction processes and antiquated production machinery meant that all cars essentially had to be hand-made. With little commonality between the various models, the cost of production continued to rise, while flat demand eventually affected Lancia's viability.

Gianni Lancia, a graduate engineer, was president of Lancia from 1947 to 1955. In 1956, the Pesenti family took control, with Carlo Pesenti in charge of the company.

=== Fiat (1969–2007) ===
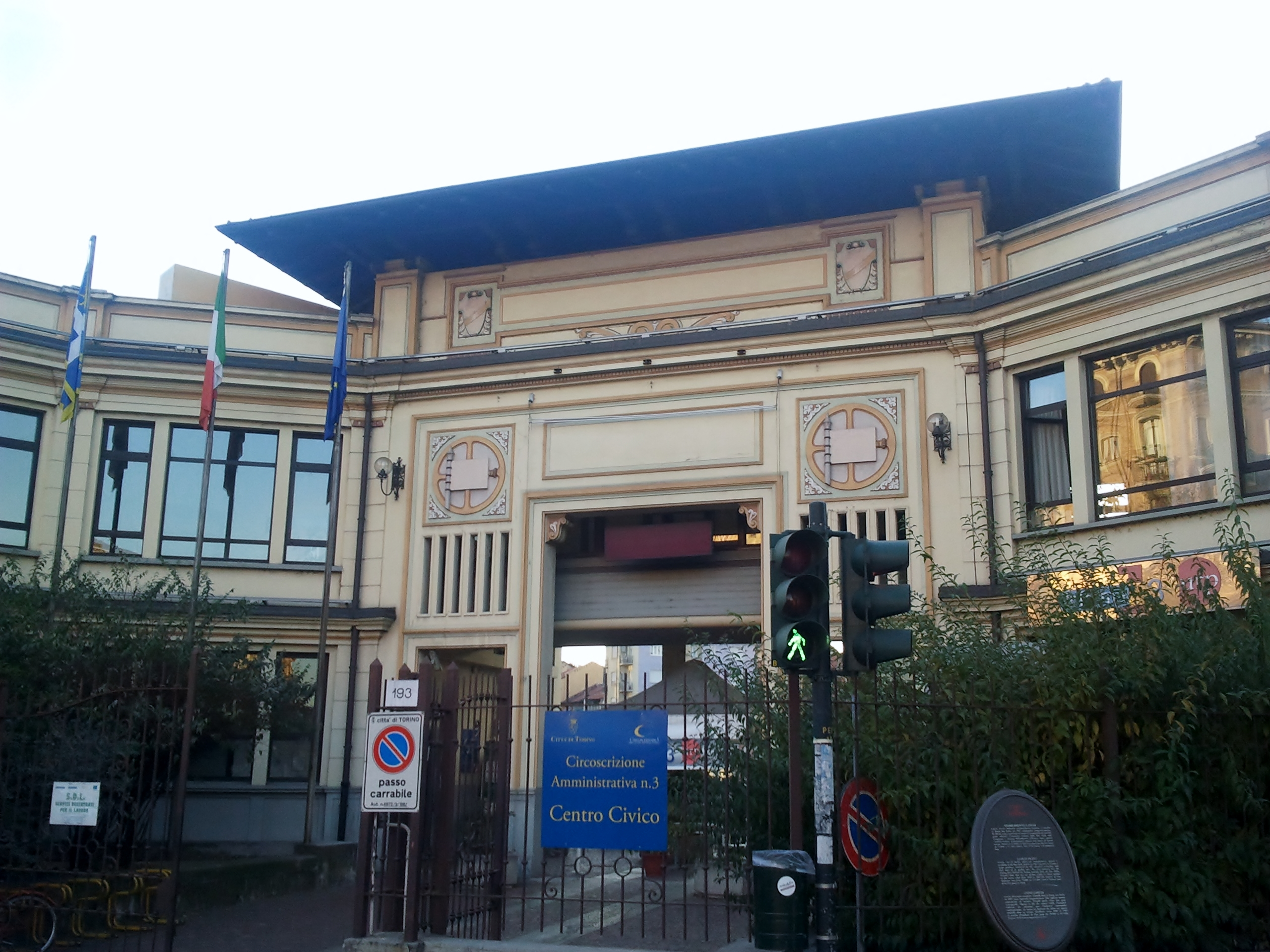
Entrance of the former Lancia Borgo San Paolo Plant in Turin, repurposed as a civic center

Fiat launched a take-over bid in October 1969. It was accepted by Lancia as the company was losing significant sums of money, with losses in 1969 being £20 million. This was not the end of the distinctive Lancia marque, and new models in the 1970s such as the Stratos, Gamma and Beta proved that Fiat wished to preserve the image of the brand it had acquired. Autobianchi, bought by Fiat Group just a year before, was put under the control of Lancia.

During the 1970s and 1980s, Lancia had great success in rallying, winning many World Rally Championships.

During the 1980s, the company cooperated with Saab Automobile, with the Lancia Delta being sold as the Saab 600 in Sweden. The 1985 Lancia Thema also shared a platform with the Saab 9000, Fiat Croma and the Alfa Romeo 164. During the 1990s, all models were closely related to other Fiat models.

==== 100th Anniversary Celebration (2006) ====
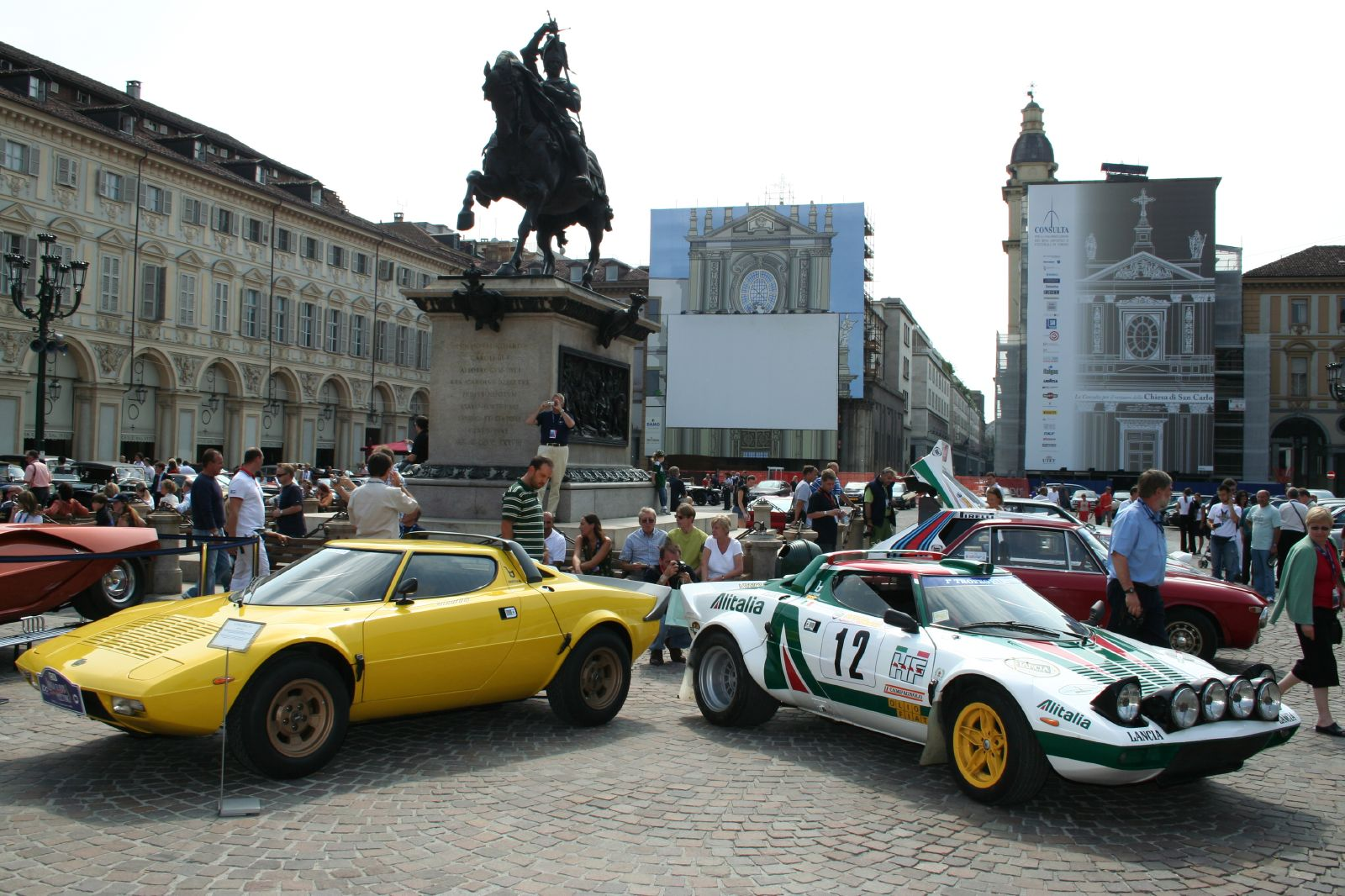
The cars on display at the 100th Anniversary Celebration of Lancia in Turin.

The celebrations for the brand's 100th anniversary took place in Turin between 4 and 10 September 2006. The Museo Nazionale dell'Automobile held an exhibition dedicated to the brand, which retraced its entire history, with models ranging from the early 1900s to the late 1980s. The event was well attended by the public and enthusiasts: hundreds of Lancia cars were displayed in Turin's historic locations, such as Piazza San Carlo, and rallies and parades were held through the streets of Turin featuring cars belonging to Lancia Club members and their owners. In total, 360 cars from collections in 18 countries, including Japan, South Africa, United States and New Zealand, took part in the event. Furthermore, the Lancia Clubs held rallies and automotive cultural initiatives to celebrate the brand in their respective and other locations throughout 2006, in Italy and abroad.

=== Fiat Group Automobiles (2007–2014) ===
Starting from 1 February 2007, Fiat's automotive operations were reorganised. Fiat Auto became Fiat Group Automobiles S.p.A., Fiat S.p.A.'s branch handling mainstream automotive production. Simultaneously the current company, Lancia Automobiles S.p.A., was created from the pre-existing brand, and controlled 100% by FCA. In 2011, Lancia moved in another direction and added new models manufactured by Chrysler and sold under the Lancia badge in many European markets, such as the 300 (named Thema), 200 Convertible (as Flavia) and Voyager. Conversely, Lancia-built models began to be sold in right-hand drive markets under the Chrysler badge.

=== FCA (2014–2021) ===
In 2015 Lancia's parent company Fiat Group Automobiles S.p.A. became FCA Italy S.p.A., reflecting the earlier incorporation of Fiat S.p.A. into Fiat Chrysler Automobiles.

After 2015, all models produced by Chrysler were discontinued in the European market. Since then, the Lancia brand has remained alive, only by continuing to manufacture and sell the Ypsilon - which received another slight facelift in 2020 - exclusively in the Italian market.

==== 110th anniversary celebration (2016) ====
The 110th anniversary celebrations of the Lancia brand took place on 27 November 2016 with conferences, exhibitions and parades organised by Lancia and the Lancia Clubs in Turin, while the celebration in Milan took place within the Milano Autoclassica event with an exhibition of 15 of the most significant Lancia cars and the introduction of a special Lancia Classiche programme offering a new certification and restoration services for historic Lancia cars.

=== Stellantis (2021–present) ===
==== The relaunch of the brand ====
Despite doubts about the brand's future following the completion of the Stellantis merger in 2021, Lancia was made part of a joint group with sister companies Alfa Romeo and DS Automobiles, to develop new premium models for the 2024 model year. As part of Stellantis' recovery plan for Lancia, Luca Napolitano was appointed the car maker's CEO, and Jean-Pierre Ploué its chief designer.

Three new electric models were announced in June 2021: a new subcompact car - which became the fourth generation of Ypsilon; a compact crossover (codenamed L74) - confirmed later in April 2023 as a five-door fastback CUV named Gamma, scheduled for a 2026 release; and a compact hatchback, likely to be a new Delta.

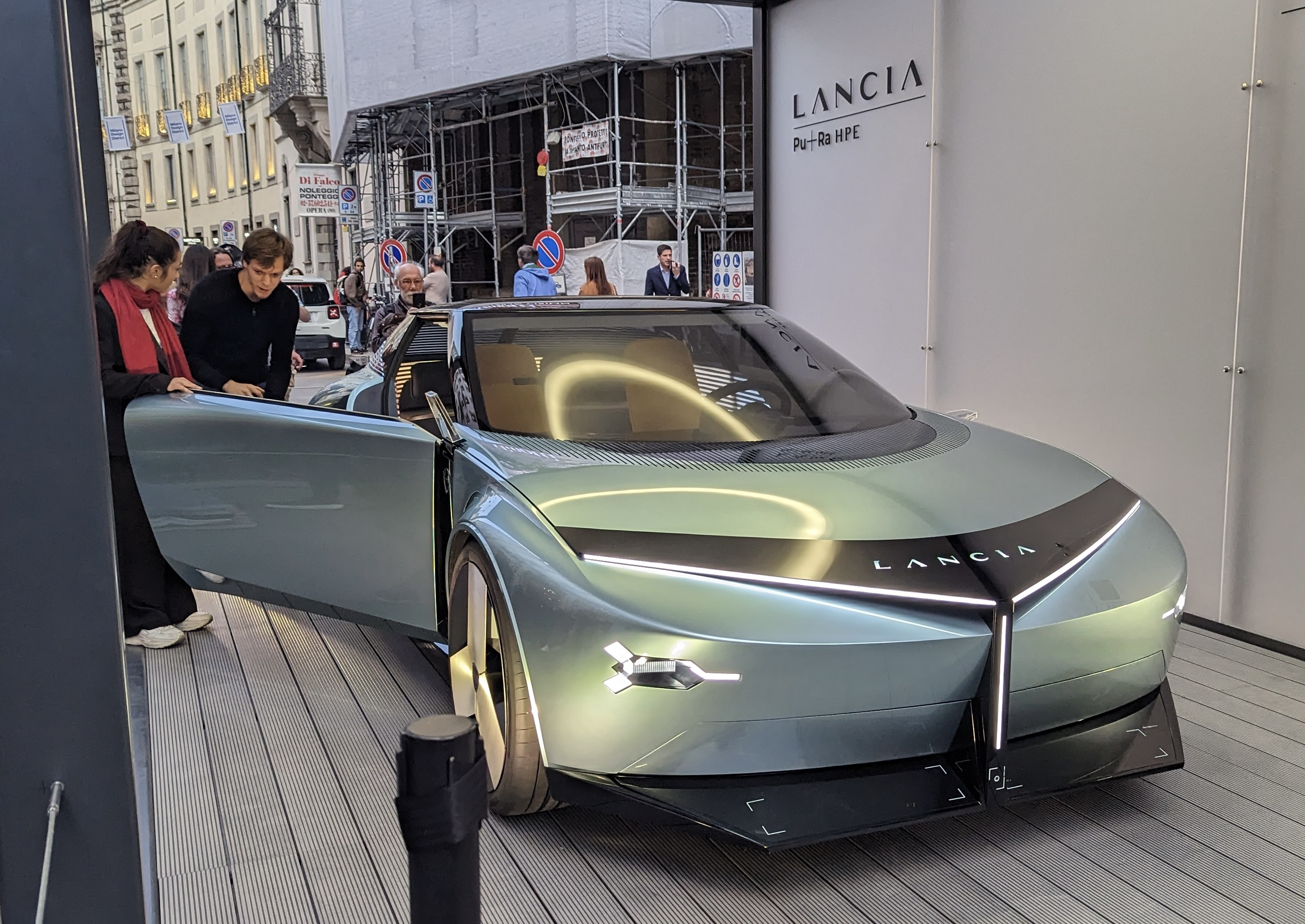
Lancia Pu+Ra HPE (2023)

On November 28, 2022, Luca Napolitano laid the cornerstone of Lancia's "renaissance" by revealing a new logo and introducing the new Pu+Ra (Pure + Radical) Design language - through a sculpture called Pu+Ra Zero. Inspired by historic models such as the Aurelia, Flaminia, Delta and the 1970 Stratos Zero concept car, future electric models will be adorned by both organic lines and geometric shapes at the same time. The iconic calice grille was reinterpreted as a new Y-shaped LED light signature, with the new wordmark above them, instead of the shield. At the rear, round taillights pays homage directly to the Stratos sports car. All these design shapes were later applied into a fully-functional concept car: the Lancia Pu+Ra HPE Concept presented on 15 April 2023 in Milan.

On 12 December 2023, a prototype of the fourth generation of Ypsilon was found at the deep of a canal in the Montbeliard region, France, close to a Stellantis' plant in Sochaux; unveiling its final design few months before the official unveil. The model had been presumed stolen during development testing rides before the sinking.

On 14 February 2024, Lancia launched the fourth generation of Ypsilon, initially offered as a limited production edition called the Ypsilon Edizione Limitata Cassina. This edition was co-developed between Lancia and Italian high-end furniture manufacturer Cassina S.p.A. Production of the model was capped at 1,906 units to commemorate Lancia's founding year of 1906.

The Ypsilon dominated the Italian market in the early months of 2024, and concluded the first quarter with 12,923 sales, up 16.4% compared to the same period in 2023.

==== The return to Rally championship ====
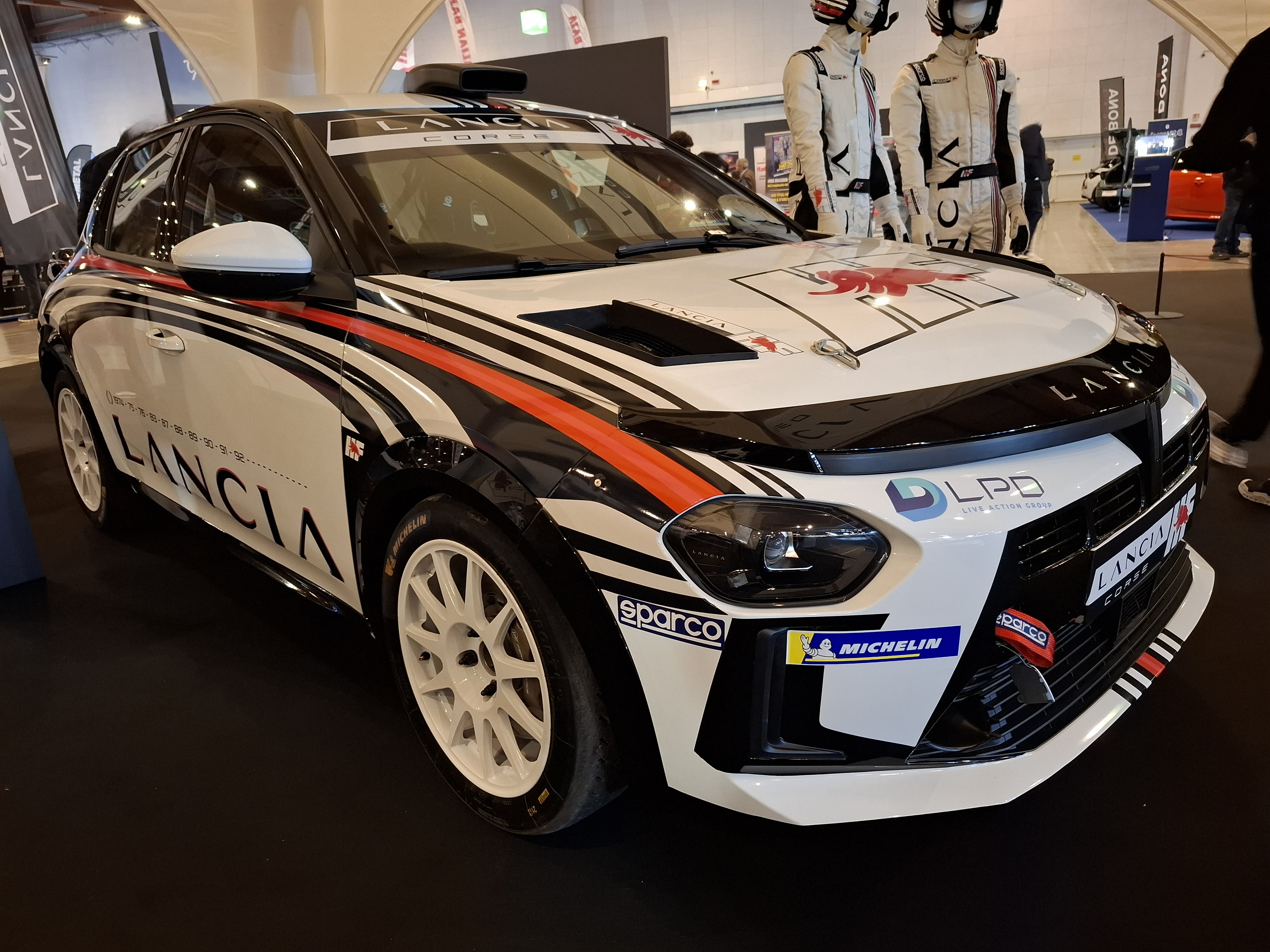
Lancia Ypsilon Rally4 HF

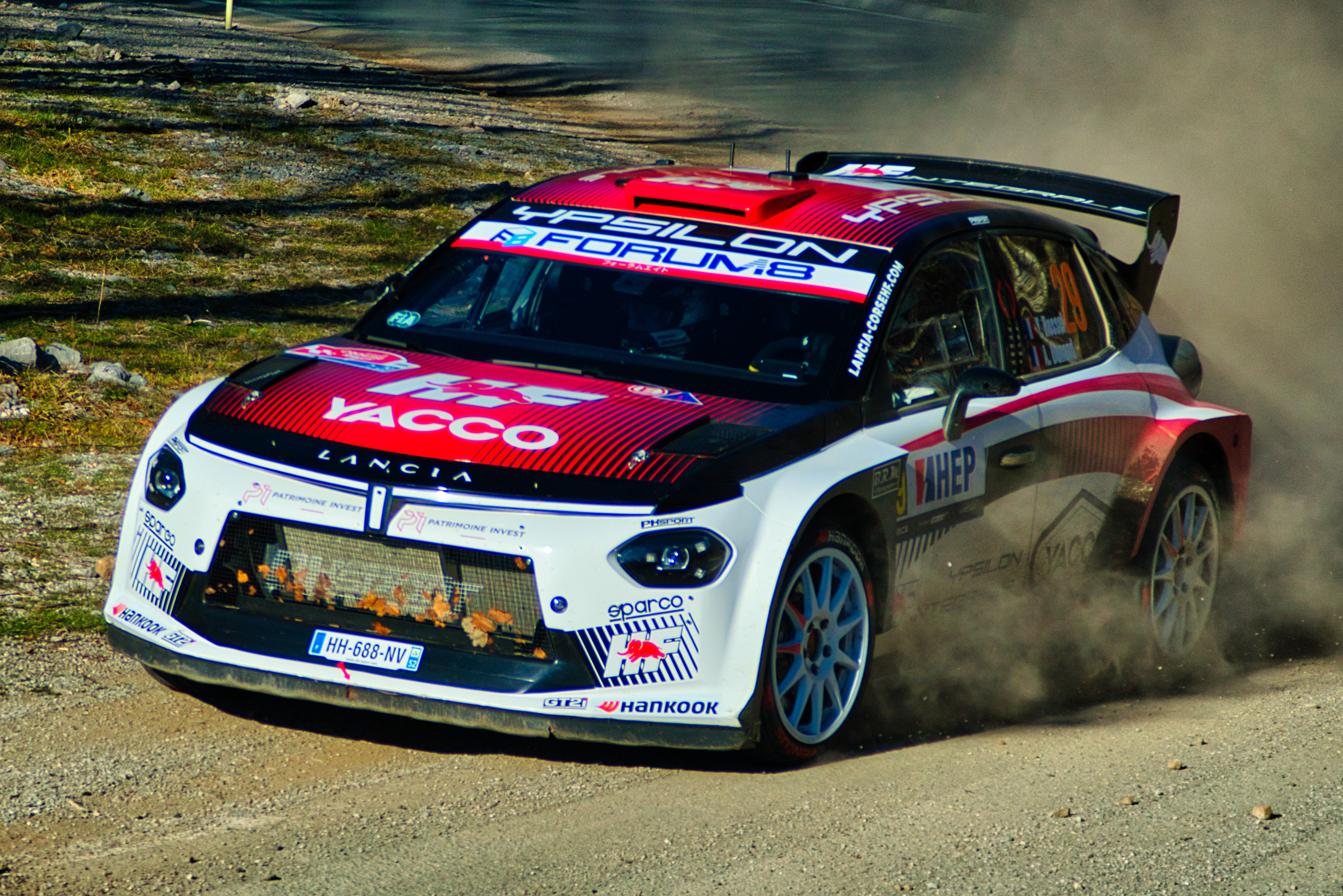
Lancia Ypsilon Rally2 HF Integrale

In May 2024, Lancia announced the revival of its HF division, unveiling an all-new Ypsilon HF version launched in May 2025, along with a Rally4 version of the same model, marking the brand's long-awaited return to rally championships. As of July 2024, the Ypsilon had sold 24,709 units, with a 3% increase in volumes and a market share of 2.8%. The first new Lancia Ypsilon was delivered on July 18, 2024, and by August, it had sold 1.362 units in the Italian market. Monthly sales later declined to 812 units by November 2024. In 2024, Lancia's overall sales stood at much lower figures, in a difficult market context, than in 2023, with 32,000 registrations. In 2025, the Lancia Ypsilon Rally4 HF marked the brand's return to Italian Rally Championship with the awarding of a single-make trophy, the Lancia Rally Trophy, which will allow the winners to participate in the European Rally Championship in 2026. The Lancia Ypsilon Rally4 HF also allows Lancia to win the Italian two-wheel drive manufacturers' title in 2025, regaining a title for the brand had been missing since 1993. It also achieved one victory in the European Rally Championship in the ERC4 and Junior classes thanks to Driver Craig Rahill and Co-driver Conor Smith in the 2025 Barum Czech Rally Zlín. Furthermore, the growing success with the public and sales has allowed the development of the Lancia Ypsilon Rally2 HF Integrale for the Group Rally2, which will compete in the 2026 WRC2 Championship. This marks the brand's return to the World Rally Championship after decades. The return to Rally competitions, the return of Lancia dealers to the European market, which took place from 2024, despite a difficult market context, and the future expansion of the range with new models planned, such as the Lancia Gamma in 2026 and Lancia Delta, have brought benefits to sales and the relaunch of the brand. In October 2025, Lancia sales in the Italian market totaled 937 units, compared to 805 in October 2024, an increase of 16.40%. In November 2025, Lancia sold 911 cars on the Italian market, an increase of +12.19% compared to the same month in 2024 with 812 cars. While in December 2025, Lancia sold 537 cars on the Italian market with a decrease of -15.57% compared to the same month in 2024 with 636 cars. However, the overall trend shows a sharp contraction in annual figures, indicating a significant decline in sales performance for the brand. Factors contributing to this decline include a lack of model range and a limited presence in key markets. However, it must be considered that the sales results are excellent compared to the fact that Lancia has practically only been on the market with one car model, the Lancia Ypsilon, since 2014. Furthermore, the brand has supported itself exclusively on the Italian market for the last 10 years. On 9 January 2026, at the Brussels Motor Show, the Lancia Ypsilon Rally2 HF Integrale was presented before its debut in the 2026 WRC2 Championship together with versions of the electric and hybrid Ypsilon HF.

In January 2026, Lancia sold 1,027 cars on the Italian market, an increase of 15.39% compared to the same month in 2025.

On 21 January 2026, the Ypsilon Rally2 HF Integrale made its debut in the 2026 Monte Carlo Rally. On 12 April 2026, the Lancia Ypsilon Rally2 HF Integrale achieved its first victory in the World Rally Championship 2, in the 2026 Croatia Rally, won by driver Yohan Rossel and co-driver Arnaud Dunand. A victory in the World Rally Championship that Lancia had not achieved for 34 years since the 1992 season. Lancia enthusiasts, "lancisti", had been waiting for decades for this return to victory in the World Rally Championship. On 31 August 2026, Lancia Corse HF won the 2026 WRC2 Championship for Teams.

==== 120th anniversary celebration (2026) ====
The 120th anniversary celebration of the Lancia brand will take place in 2026. The celebration will also see the debut of the new Lancia Gamma, which will finally expand the brand's range. During the celebrations, a tribute will be paid to World Rally Champion Sandro Munari, who passed away on 28 February 2026. Munari's sporting achievements and memorable victories significantly contributed to consolidating the legend of the Lancia brand. Another tribute will be held for Alex Fiorio, rally driver, son of Cesare Fiorio, runner-up in 1989 World Rally Championship, who passed away at the age of 61, on 17 August 2026. On 13 September 2026, during the celebrations for the 120th anniversary of Lancia at the Turin Auto Show, Lancia Corse HF achieved another victory in the World Rally Championship 2, in the 2026 Rally Chile, won by driver Yohan Rossel and co-driver Arnaud Dunand.

== Leadership ==
- Vincenzo Lancia (1906–1937)
- Adele Miglietti and Gianni Lancia (1937–1947)
- Gianni Lancia (1947–1955)
- Carlo Pesenti (1956–1969)
- Olivier François (2009–2021)
- Luca Napolitano (2021–2025)
- Roberta Zerbi (2025–2026)
- Arnaud Belloni (2026–present)

== Production models ==
- 2024 figure is sales across Europe

Lancia production 1990–2026
Year	Cars
1911	360
1990	300,087
1991	265,172
1992	223,127
1993	163,636
1994	163,535
1995	162,416
1996	159,251
1997	176,211
1998	175,215
1999	161,019
2000	170,348
2001	134,812
2002	110,529
2003	108,989
2004	118,201
2005	115,543
2006	122,956
2007	118,036
2008	113,307
2009	113,810
2010	97,757
2011	100,007
2012	98,733
2013	71,223
2014	69,835
2015	61,652
2016	67,059
2017	60,620
2018	48,555
2019	58,759
2020	43,033
2021	43,735
2022	40,991
2023	44,884 (Italy only)
2024	32,179 (Italy only)
2025	9,714 (Italy only)
2026	7,511 (Italy only until October 2026)

=== Current car models ===
==== Lancia Ypsilon ====
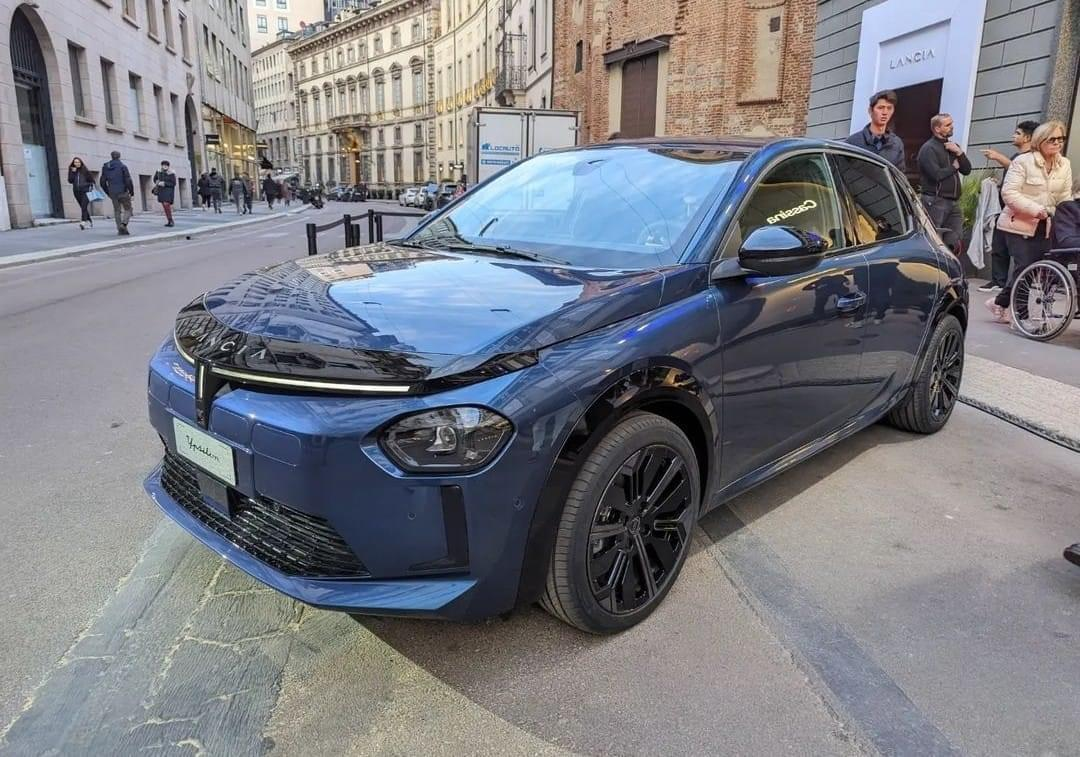
2024 Lancia Ypsilon

The Ypsilon is a premium 5-door supermini car produced since 2024. It is based on the CMP/e-CMP platform. It is a replacement for the Fiat 500 based model launched in 2011. Since 2017, it was only available in Italy, but in late 2024 it once again went on sale in select European markets as well. In the United Kingdom and Ireland it was previously sold as the Chrysler Ypsilon.

For a long time, the Ypsilon has been the only Lancia car in production and only for sale in Italy, where it continued to be popular – it was the second best-selling car in Italy in 2019. The new, Peugeot-based Ypsilon is not selling as well. Cumulative Italian sales for the first three months in 2025 were 2,926 units, down over 70 percent year-on-year.

==== Lancia Delta ====
- Lancia Delta (2028)

=== Past car models ===
- Lancia 2000
- Lancia Appia
- Lancia Ardea
- Lancia Augusta
- Lancia Beta
- Lancia Dedra
- Lancia Delta
- Lancia Flaminia
- Lancia Flavia
- Lancia Fulvia
- Lancia Gamma
- Lancia Kappa
- Lancia Lambda
- Lancia Lybra
- Lancia Montecarlo
- Lancia Musa
- Lancia Prisma
- Lancia Thema
- Lancia Thesis
- Lancia Trevi
- Lancia Zeta / Lancia Z

==== Historical models ====
The Lancia Aurelia introduced the front engine rear transmission configuration later used by Ferrari, Alfa Romeo, Porsche, GM, Volvo and Maserati, as well as the V6 engine, which is now common. It had inboard rear brakes, an important way of reducing un-sprung weight.

The Lancia Stratos was a successful rally car during the 1970s, and helped the company to improve its sporting credentials.

==== Chrysler-derived models ====
The second generation Lancia Thema executive car (2011 – 2014) was a re-branded second generation Chrysler 300 unveiled in 2011 to replace the Thesis. It reused the name of the Italian made 1984–94 Thema saloon. It used to be available in various European markets, but for the United Kingdom and Ireland it was only sold as the Chrysler 300C. It was discontinued in 2015.

The Lancia Voyager was a large MPV unveiled in 2011, which was based on the Chrysler Town & Country. It was marketed in various European markets, but for the United Kingdom and Ireland it was only sold as the Chrysler Grand Voyager. It was discontinued in 2015.

Between 2012 and 2014, the Chrysler 200 Convertible was rebranded and marketed under the Lancia Flavia name. The Flavia was only available in left-hand drive markets, and thus not sold in the United Kingdom or Ireland.

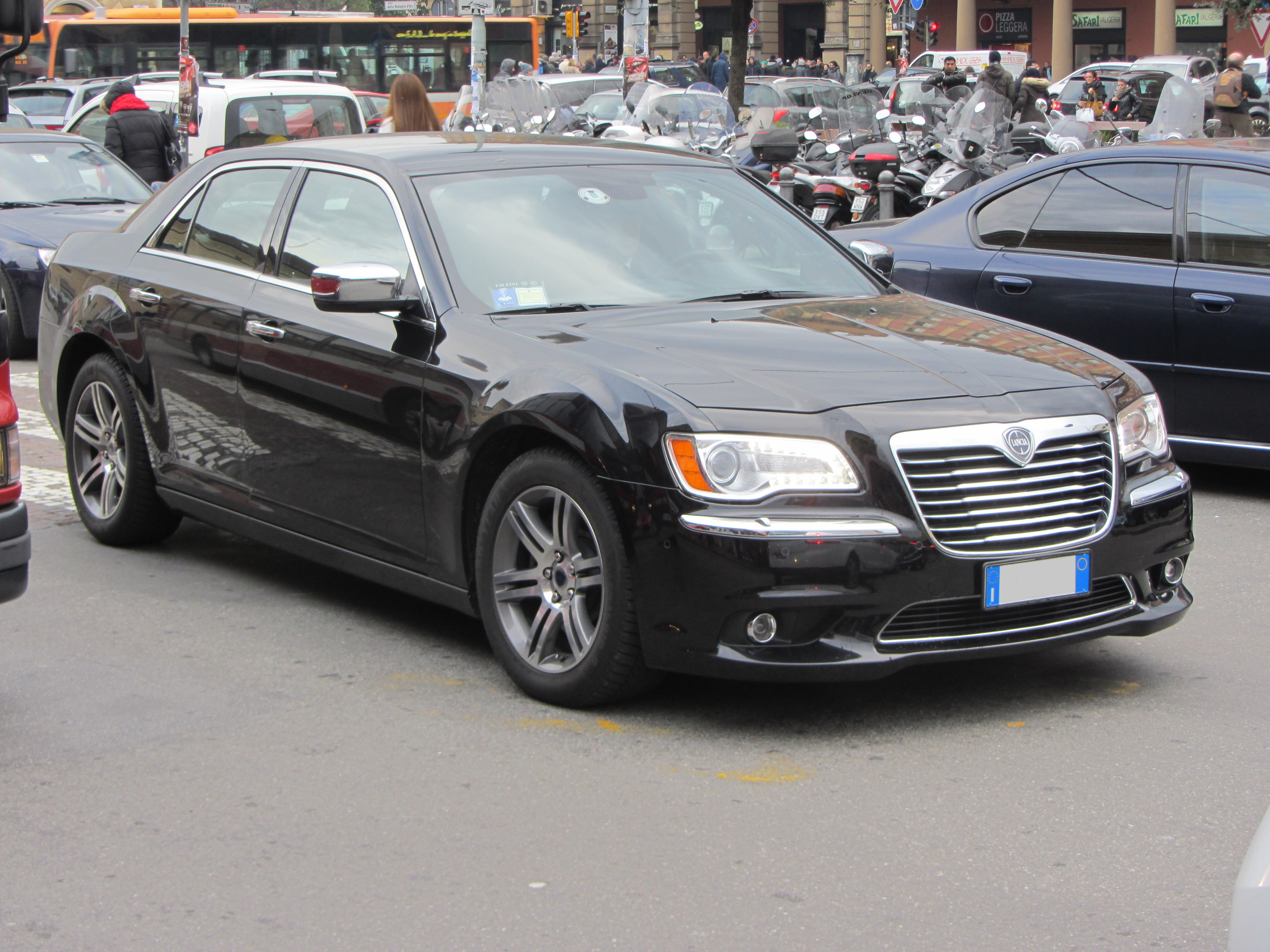
Lancia Thema

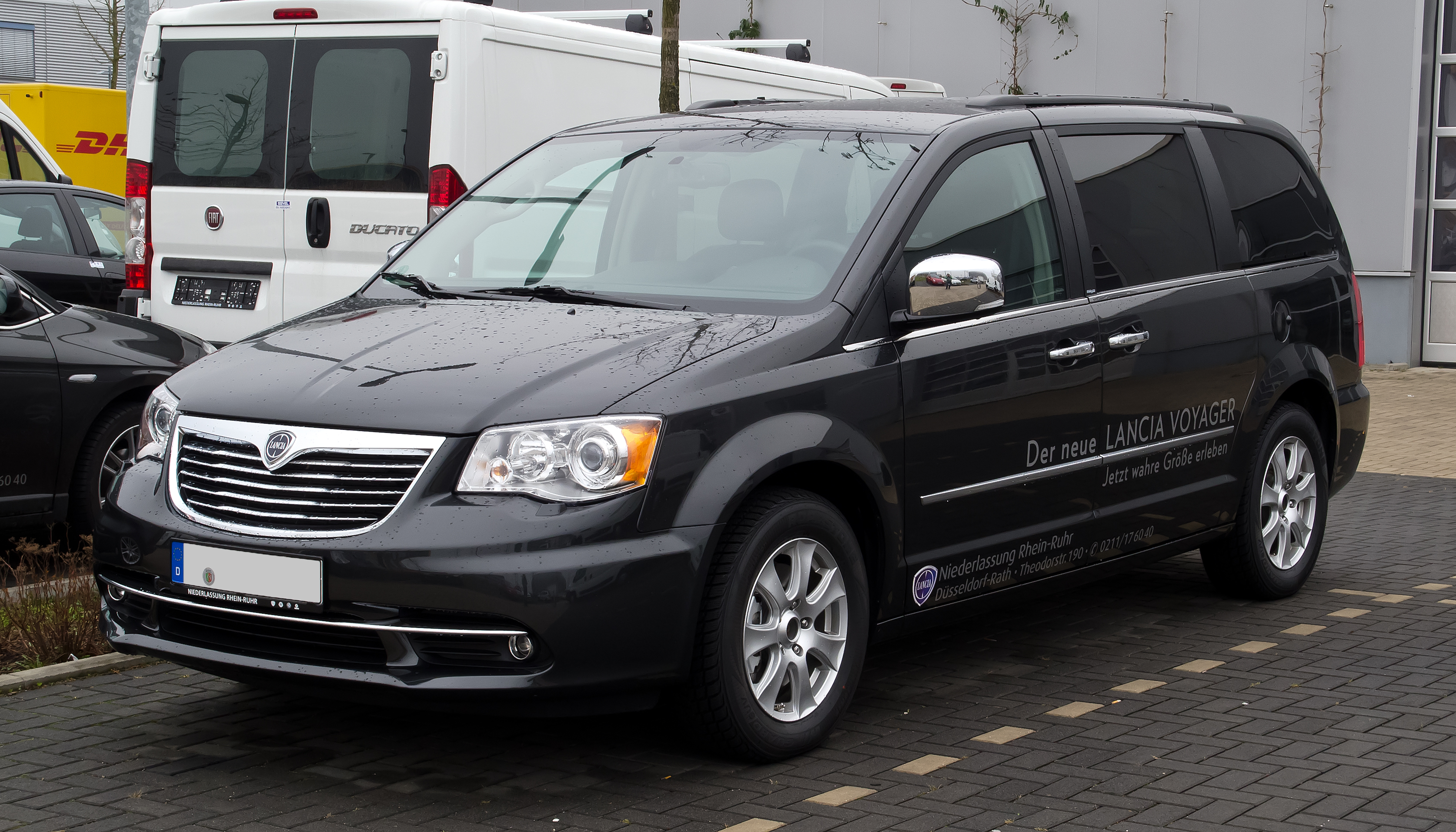
Lancia Voyager

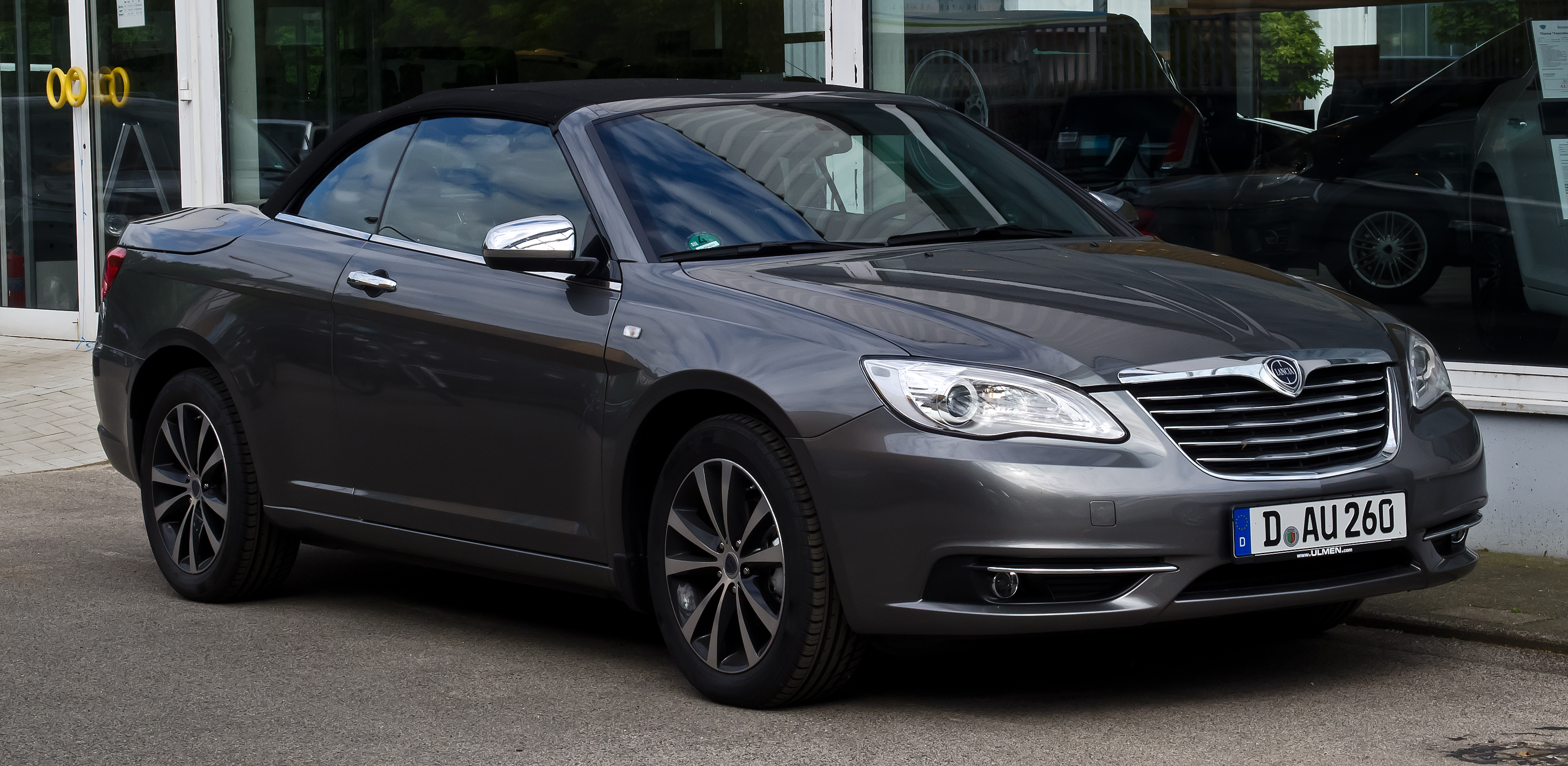
Lancia Flavia

=== Concept cars ===
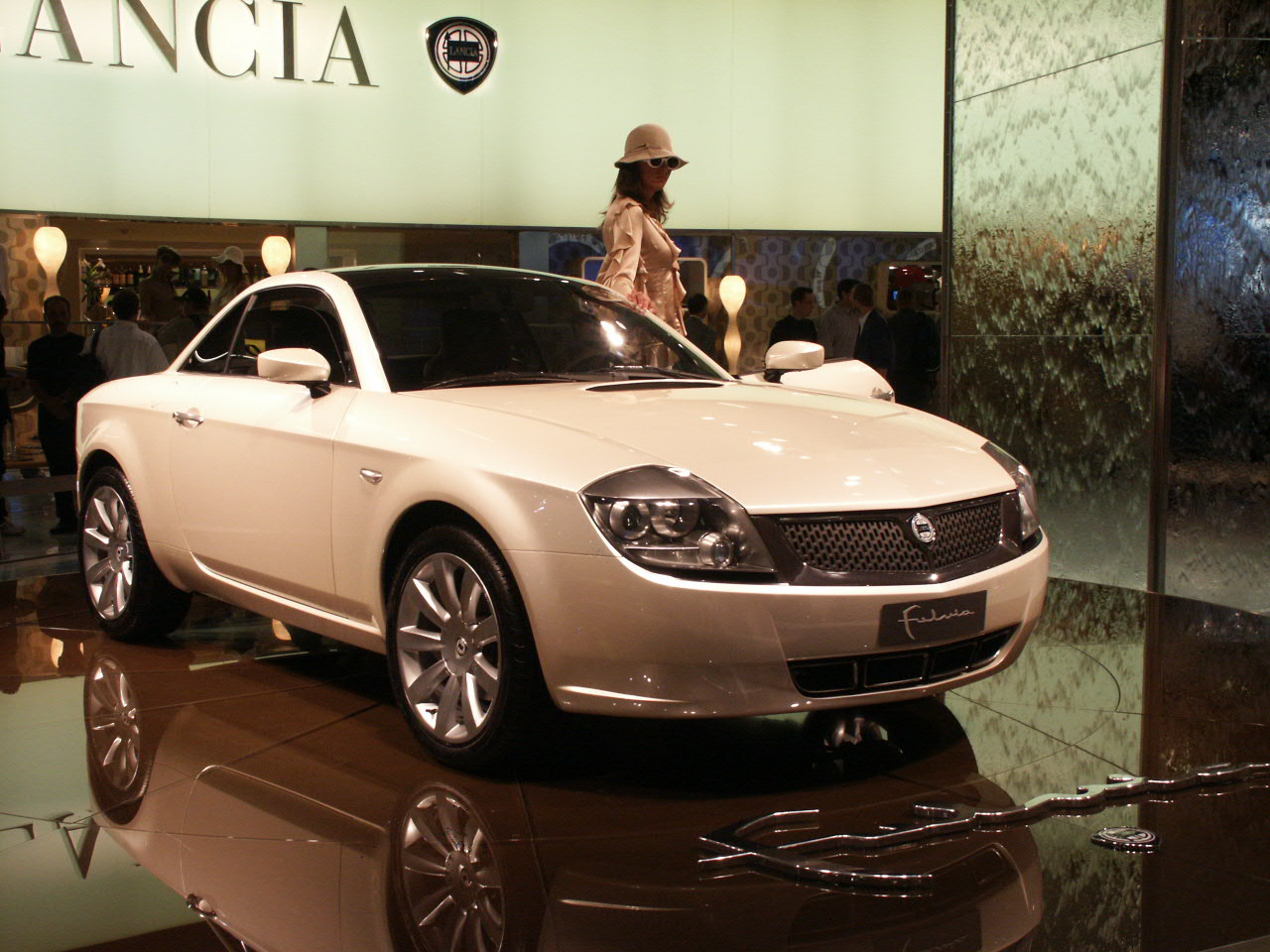
Lancia Fulvia Coupé Concept at IAA 2003 designed by Flavio Manzoni

Lancia has shown several concept cars to the public including the Flaminia Loratmo (1958), Stratos Zero (1970), the Megagamma by Italdesign Giugiaro and Sibilo by Bertone in 1978, Hit (1988) by Pininfarina, the Bertone-designed Kayak (1995), the Dialogos (1998) and Nea in 2000. The company showed the Granturismo Stilnovo and Fulvia concepts in 2003. Lancia has shown the PU+RA HPE concept in 2023 as part of brand renaissance strategy.

=== Special cars ===
In the end of 1960, Lancia made their first landaulet-limousine for the President of Italy, called the Lancia Flaminia 335 Presidenziale.

In 1989, Lancia made a limousine version of the Thema. Production was limited to 24 examples, only for Fiat Group executives.

In 1999, Lancia made a one-off limousine version of the Kappa and at the 2004 Geneva Motor Show, Stola showed a limousine version of the Thesis.

== Export markets ==
In January 2014, in an interview with La Repubblica, Fiat CEO Sergio Marchionne foreshadowed that Lancia would become an Italy–only brand, and focus only on the Ypsilon supermini range. However, in 2024, the brand began to be exported to other markets again.

=== France ===
In August 2024, Stellantis & You, a subsidiary of the Stellantis group dedicated to automobile distribution in Europe, has opened the very first Lancia point of sale located in La Défense, near Paris.

=== United States ===
While some models had been imported on a small scale during the 1950s to the 1960s, Lancias were sold in the United States from 1975. Sales were comparatively slow, and the range was withdrawn at the same time as Fiat in 1982.

In 2009, following Fiat's acquisition of a stake in United States–based Chrysler and part of Chrysler's restructuring plans, it was stated that Fiat plans for the Chrysler brand and Lancia to co–develop products, with some vehicles being shared. Olivier Francois, Lancia's CEO, took over as CEO of the Chrysler division in October 2009. Fiat also announced that, depending on the market, some Chrysler cars would be sold as Lancias and vice versa.

Francois' plans to re-establish the Chrysler brand as an upscale brand were somewhat muddied by the discontinuance of the Plymouth brand. At the 2010 Detroit Auto Show, a Chrysler-badged Lancia Delta was on display, but this did not result in sales in the United States, with proposals to instead modify an Alfa Romeo for sale by 2013.

=== United Kingdom ===
Lancia first established a presence in the United Kingdom in 1907, when Walter Stewart persuaded Vincenzo Lancia to let him become the firm's nationwide distributor. Stewart maintained a full service operation that aimed to meet the requirements of each individual buyer, a standard that only the likes of Rolls-Royce could match. In 1936, a Lancia Car Club was founded by the Earl of March (later the 9th Duke of Richmond) at Goodwood, which eleven years later became the Lancia Motor Club. Freddie March, as he was commonly known then, became the Lancia distributor for England and the British Empire at around the same time, catering exclusively for wealthy enthusiasts who could afford such a prestigious marque. Over the following decades, Lancia evolved from being a niche producer for the well-heeled into a small but durable mass-volume concern, producing well-engineered cars that were renowned for their performance. This reputation for quality bore fruit in terms of sales: in 1978, 11,800 Lancia vehicles were sold in Britain, making it the firm's biggest export market. Reportedly, by this time Lancia was outselling "key rivals in the UK such as BMW, Audi and Saab".

However, Lancia's reputation was significantly undermined in 1980, when defective Lancia Beta models, suffering from significant suspension sub-frame corrosion problems, were purchased back from owners by the company in a highly publicised campaign. These cars were later crushed. The brand never recovered from the damage inflicted during the Beta recall and, combined with a range of related factors (including poor residual values, which made their range uncompetitive), decided to withdraw from the United Kingdom (and other right-hand drive markets) in February 1994. The last model to be sold in the United Kingdom was the Delta, boosted by its rallying reputation, withdrawn from sale in 1995, although a small number of left-hand drive Lancia models have since reached the UK as personal imports.

After 1995, there were continuous rumours suggesting Lancia's return to the United Kingdom. In November 2005, What Car? reported rumours over the alleged return, to rival "affordable" premium makes, such as Saab and Volvo. In September 2006, What Car? reported that Lancia were returning to the United Kingdom. The relaunch date was set for August 2008. In April 2008, Car reported that Lancia had postponed the relaunch. In June 2009, Autocar reported that the relaunch of Lancia was now “very unlikely”.

These rumours were credible since Lancia models, by that time, shared common parts with Fiat and Alfa Romeo models that were imported, sold and maintained by an existing dealership network. The cost to reestablish the brand would therefore be minimal. In December 2008, however, Fiat cancelled relaunch plans, due to financial concerns coinciding with the 2008 financial crisis, and the recession.

In 2011, Lancia Ypsilon and Delta models were eventually reintroduced to the United Kingdom, but were sold under the Chrysler marque. In January 2014, the slow-selling Delta model was dropped from this line-up. In March 2015, Fiat Group announced that the Chrysler brand would be discontinued in the United Kingdom in 2017, citing a desire to focus largely on the Jeep brand instead.

=== Japan ===
A small number of Lancia models were previously sold in Japan, such as Fulvia, Stratos and Delta. More recently, some models have been sold under the Chrysler brand, such as the Ypsilon.

== Lancia in motorsport ==
=== Formula One ===
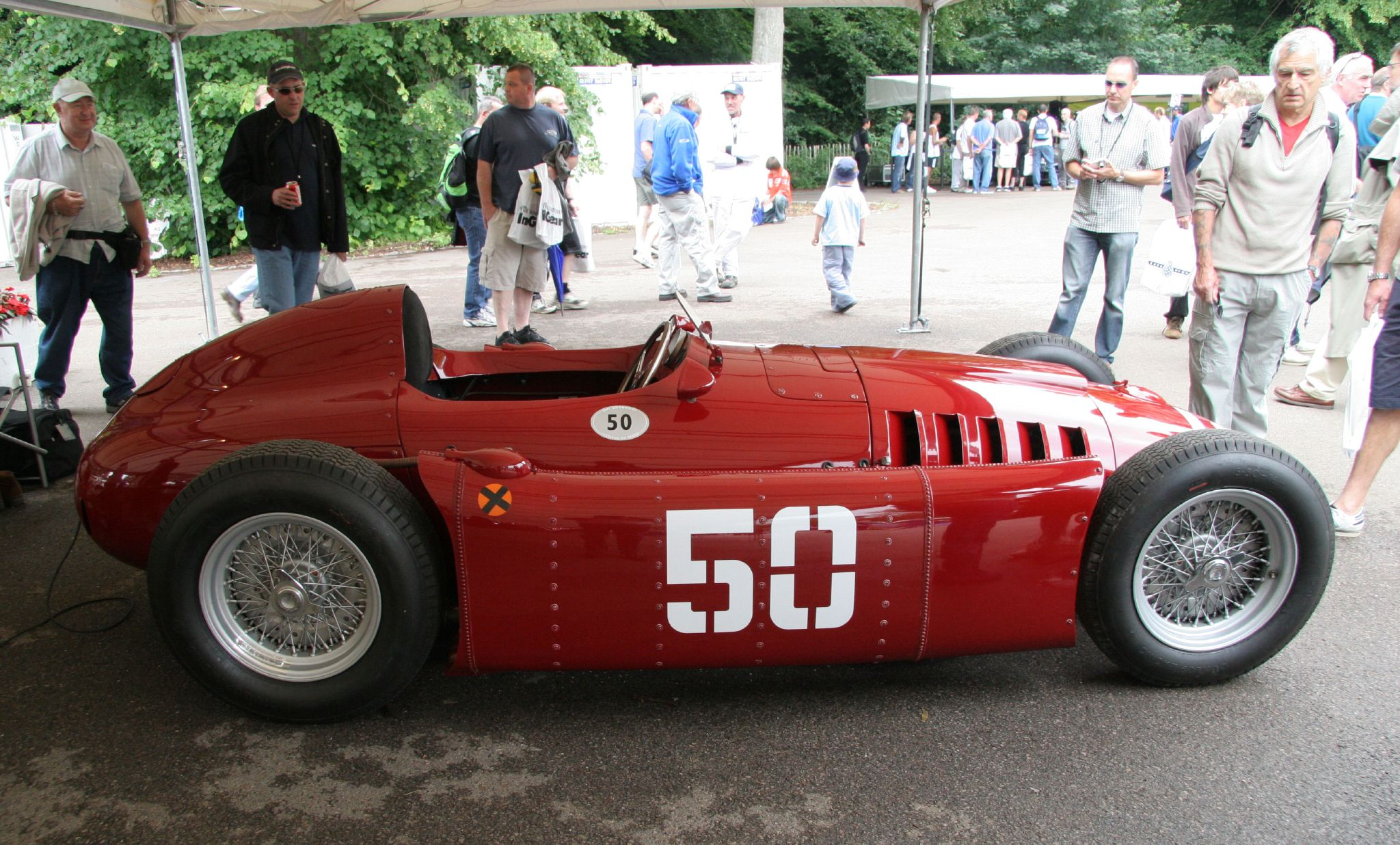
A Lancia D50A Formula One car

After Vincenzo Lancia's son Gianni became director of the firm, it started to take part more frequently in motorsport, eventually deciding to build a Grand Prix car. Vittorio Jano was the new designer for Lancia and his Lancia D50 was entered into the 1954 Spanish Grand Prix, where Alberto Ascari took the pole position and drove the fastest lap. In the 1955 Monaco Grand Prix Ascari crashed into the harbour after missing a chicane. One week later Ascari was killed in an accident driving a Ferrari sports car at Monza. With Ascari's death and Lancia's financial problems the company withdrew from Grand Prix racing. Altogether Lancia took two victories and ten podiums in Formula One.

Remnants of the Lancia team were transferred to Scuderia Ferrari, where Juan Manuel Fangio won the 1956 championship with a Lancia-Ferrari car.

=== Rallying ===
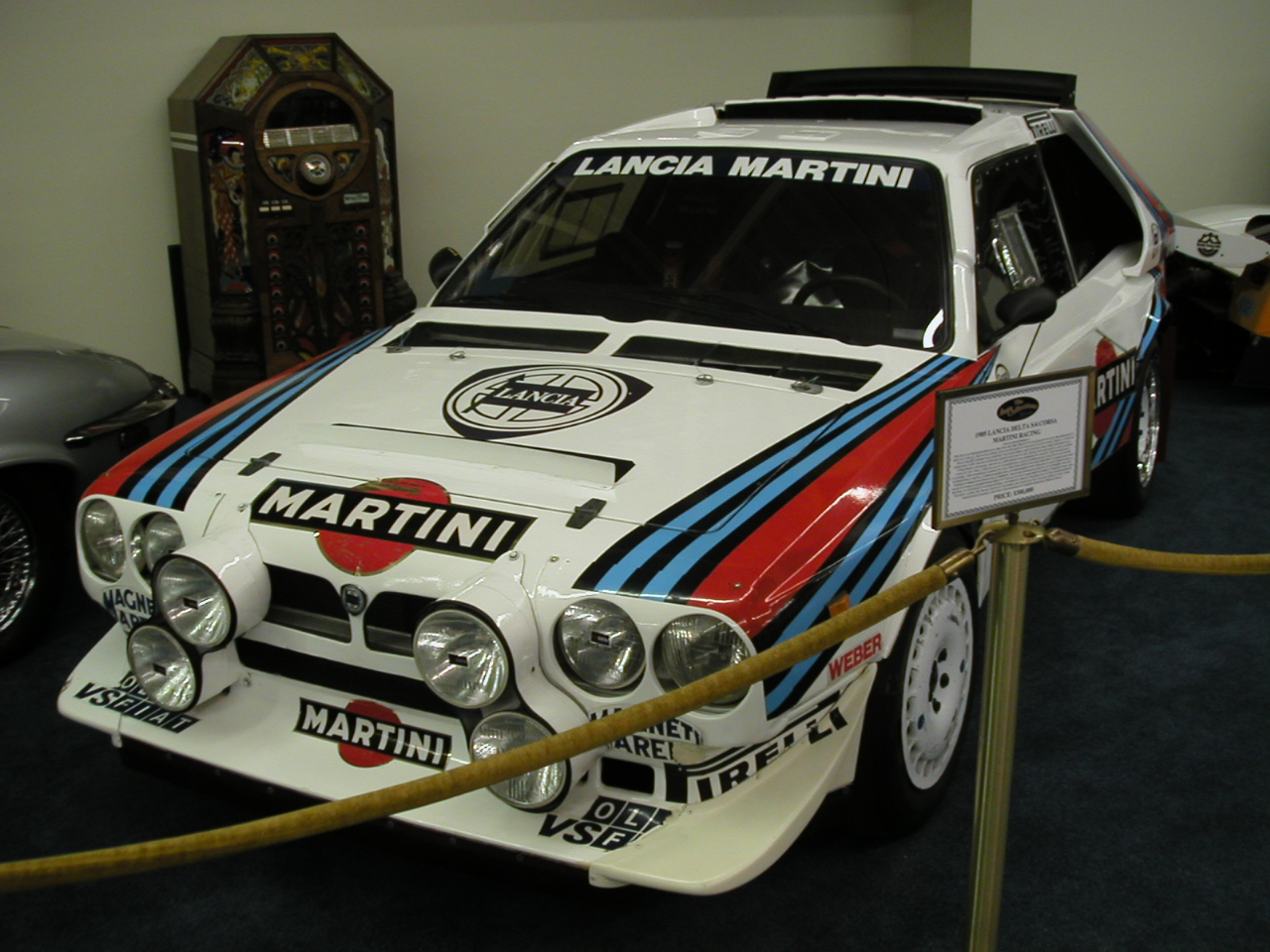
A Lancia Delta S4 Group B rally car

Lancia has been very successful in motorsport over the years, and mostly in the arena of rallying. Prior to the forming of the World Rally Championship (WRC), Lancia took the final International Championship for Manufacturers title with the Fulvia in 1972. In the WRC, they remain the most statistically successful marque (despite having withdrawn at the end of the 1993 season), winning constructors' titles with the Stratos (1974, 1975 and 1976), the 037 (1983) and the Delta (six consecutive wins from 1987 to 1992). The Delta is also the most successful individual model designation ever to compete in rallying. All this gave Lancia a total of 11 Championships over the years and 15 European Championship from 1969 to 1992.

Juha Kankkunen and Miki Biasion both won two drivers' titles with the Delta. Among other drivers to take several World Rally Championship wins with Lancia were Markku Alén, Didier Auriol, Sandro Munari, Bernard Darniche, Walter Röhrl, Björn Waldegård and Henri Toivonen. The history of the brand in rallying is also tainted with tragedy, with deaths of Italian driver Attilio Bettega at the 1985 Tour de Corse in a Lancia 037 and then Finnish championship favourite Toivonen in a Lancia Delta S4 at the same rally exactly a year later. These deaths eventually led to the end of Group B rallying.

=== Sports car racing ===
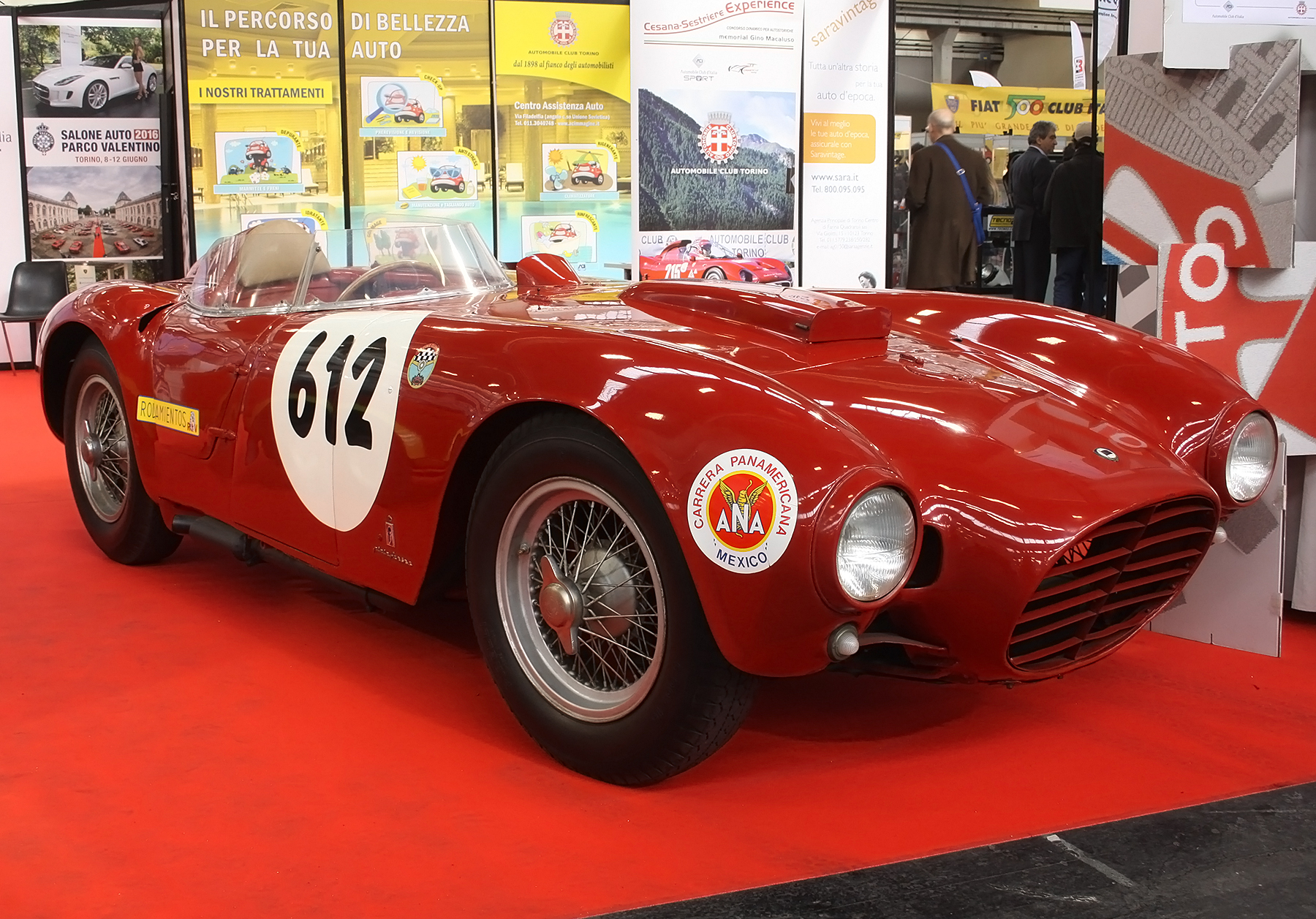
Lancia D24

In 1951 Mille Miglia, Lancia Aurelia B20 GT came second overall.

In 1953, Umberto Maglioli won the Targa Florio at the wheel of the Lancia D20. The same year Lancia introduced the D24 sports racer, which was an evolution of D23 model, but rebodied as a spider by Pinin Farina. Its most significant victories were the 1953 Carrera Panamericana, the 1954 Mille Miglia and the 1954 Targa Florio.

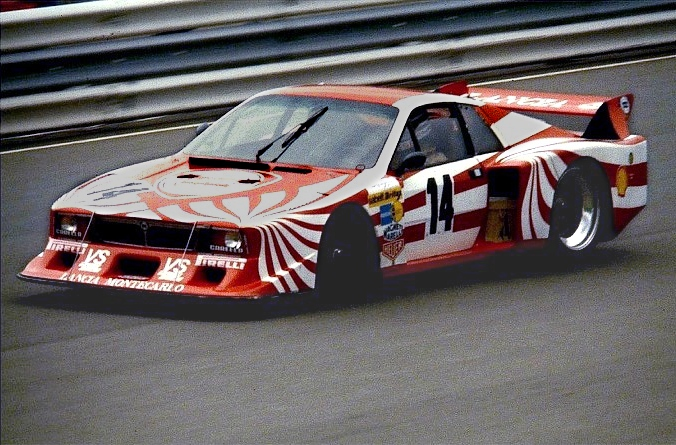
A Lancia Beta Montecarlo Group 5 car

During Lancia's dominance of rallying, the company also expanded into sports cars in the late 1970s until the mid-1980s. It first ran the Stratos HF in Group 4, and for a brief interlude with a rare Group 5 version. The car was replaced with the successful Beta Montecarlo Turbo winning the FIA's 1980 World Championship for Makes and 1981 World Endurance Championship for Makes and the 1980 Deutsche Rennsport Meisterschaft.

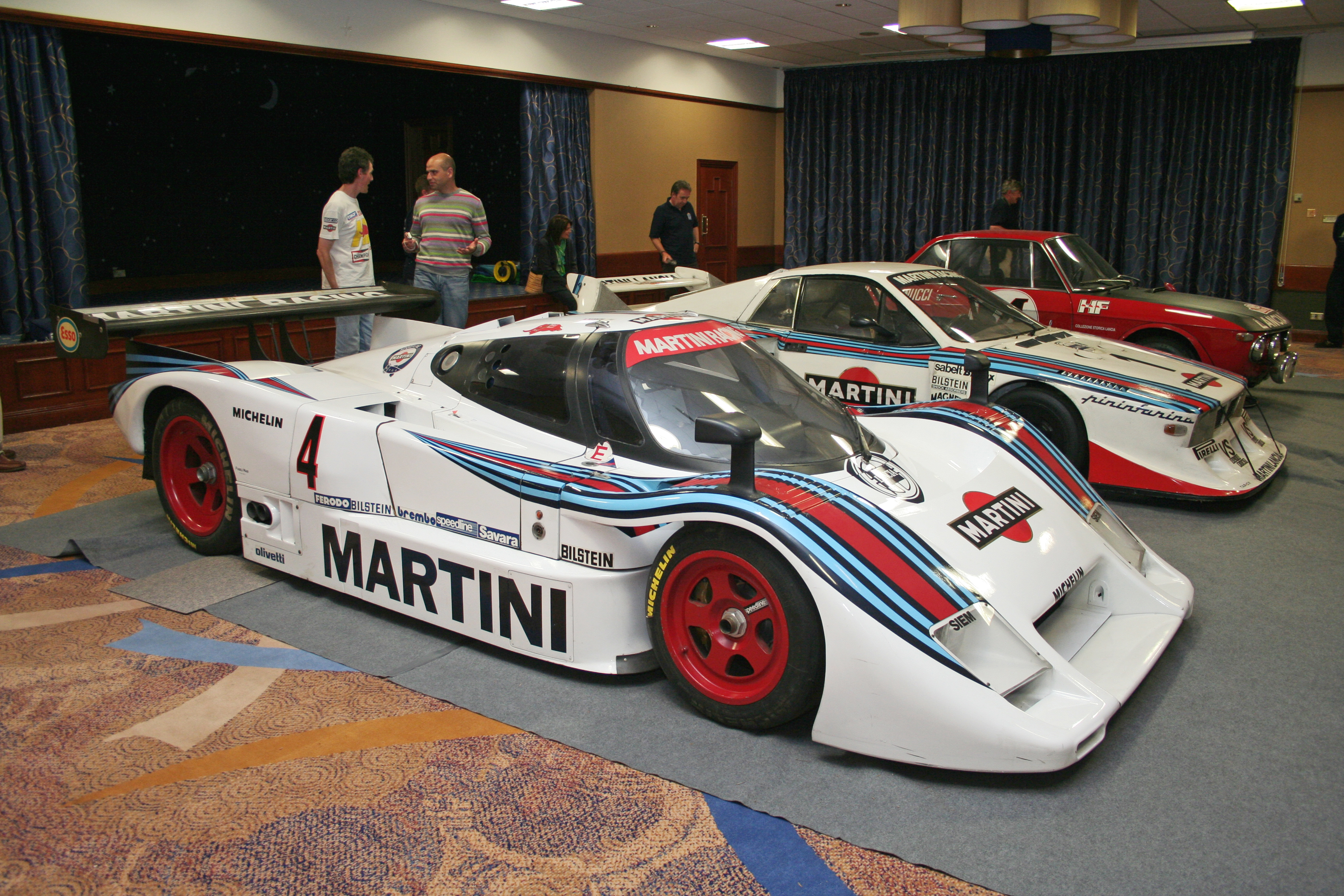
A Lancia LC2 Group C sports car

In 1982 the team moved up to Group 6 with the LC1 Spyder, followed by the Group C LC2 coupé which featured a Ferrari powerplant in 1983. The LC2 was a match for the standard-setting Porsche 956 in terms of raw speed, securing 13 pole positions over its lifetime; however, its results were hampered by poor reliability and fuel economy, and it only managed to win three European and World Endurance Championship races. The team's inability to compete against the dominant Porsche 956 and 962 sports cars led it to drop out of sportscar racing at the end of 1986 in order to concentrate on rallying, although private teams continued to enter LC2s with declining results until the early 1990s.

==== Titles ====
- 1979 World Championship for Makes (under 2-litre division)
- 1980 World Championship for Makes (overall)
- 1981 World Endurance Championship for Makes (overall)
- 1980 Deutsche Rennsport Meisterschaft

== Commercial vehicles ==
Lancia produced a wide range of vans, trucks, buses and military vehicles from the beginning, forming Lancia Veicoli Industriali in 1912. Lancia slowly withdrew from the commercial sectors during the late 1960s and production of commercial vehicles ended in the early 1970s, shortly after Fiat's takeover of the company, with some models of Lancia Veicoli Speciali transferred to Iveco.

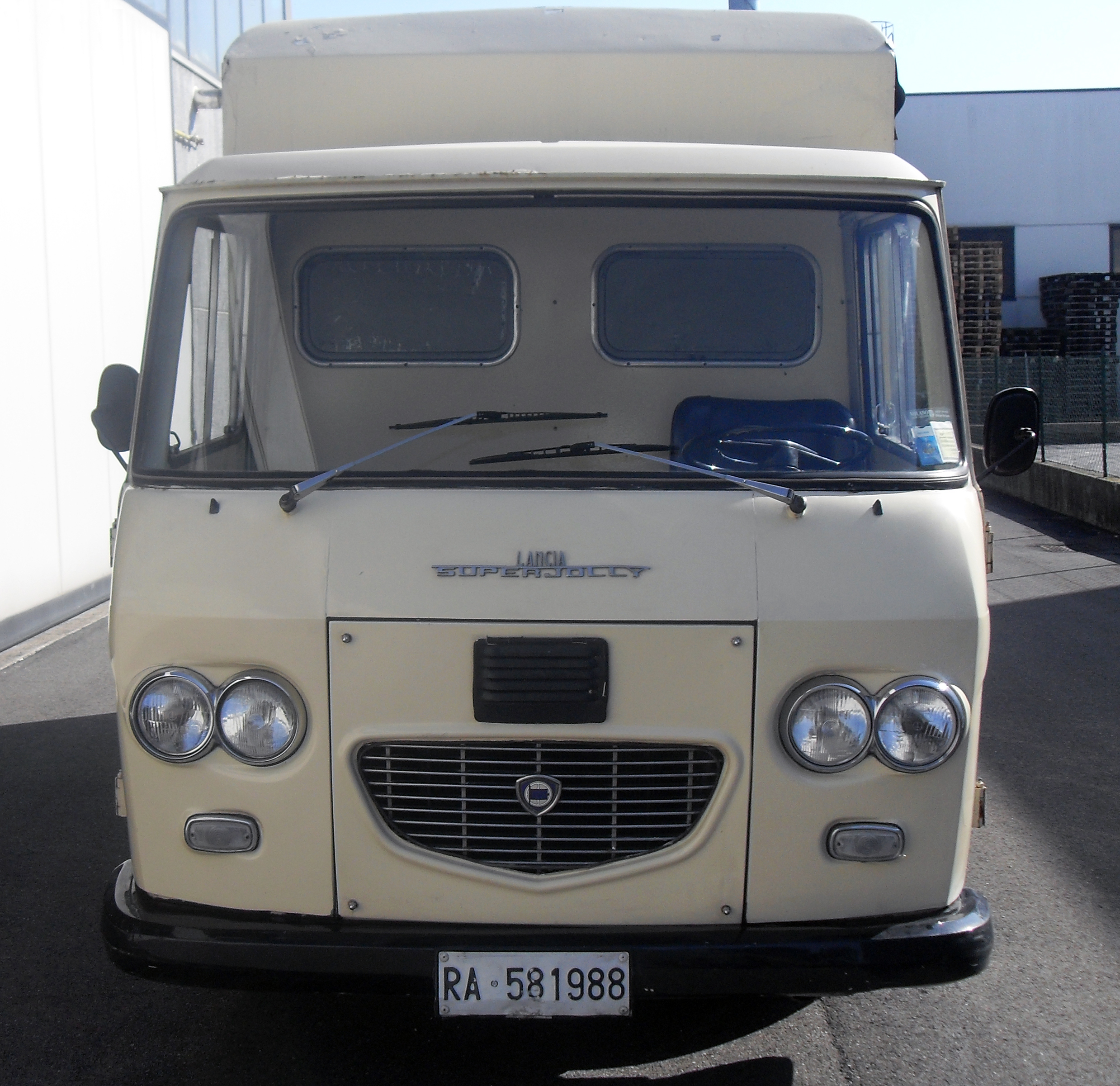
Lancia Superjolly

=== Light commercial vehicles ===
- 1958 Lancia Ardea Furgoncino (van), Cassone (pick-up)
- 1950 Lancia Beta
- 1953 Lancia Appia Furgoncino (van), Camioncino (pick-up)
- 1959 Lancia Jolly
- 1963 Lancia Superjolly

=== Heavy commercial vehicles ===
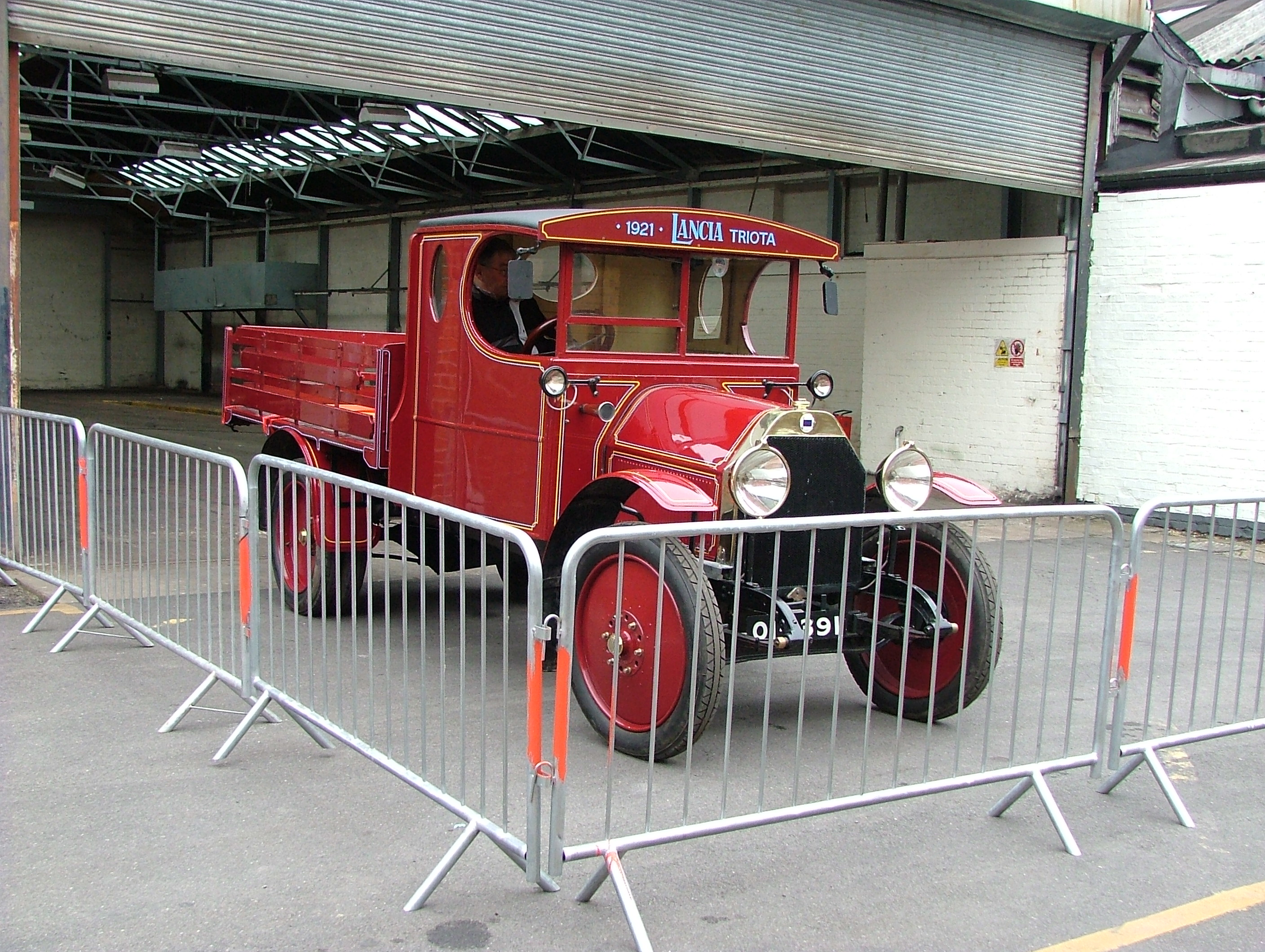
Lancia Triota 1921

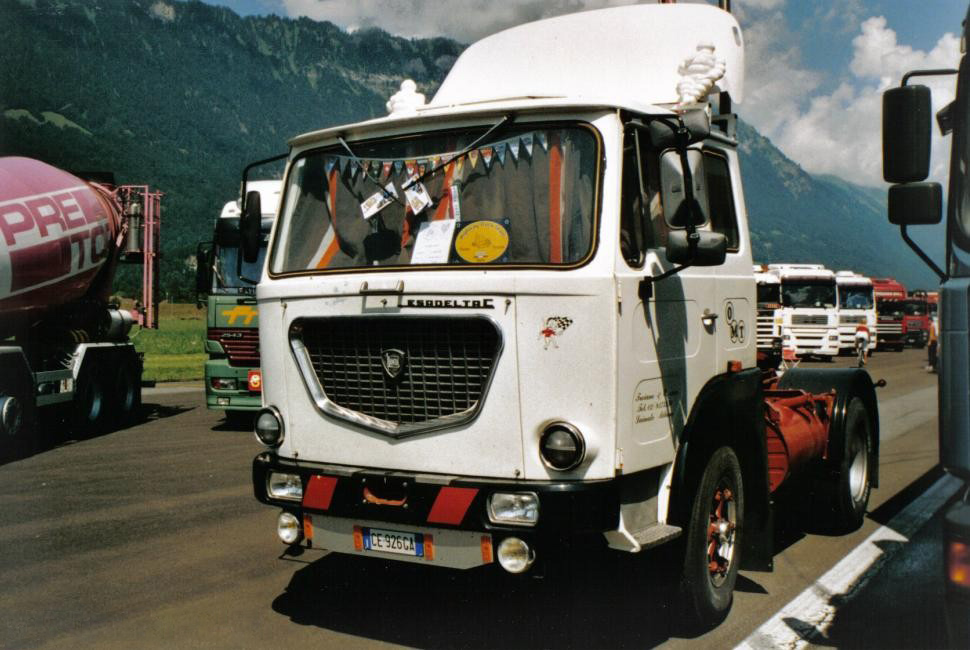
Lancia Esadelta C

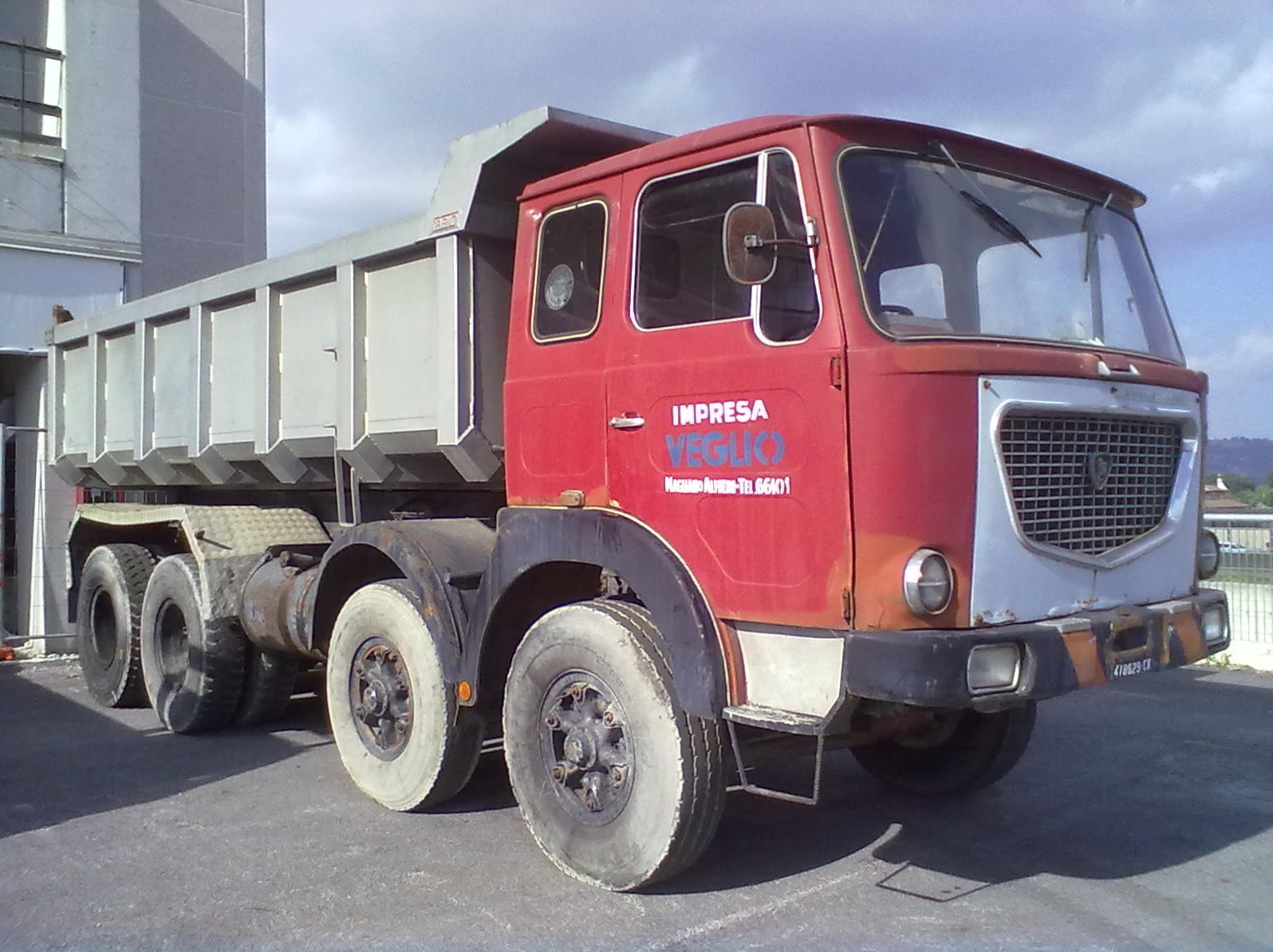
Lancia Esagamma E

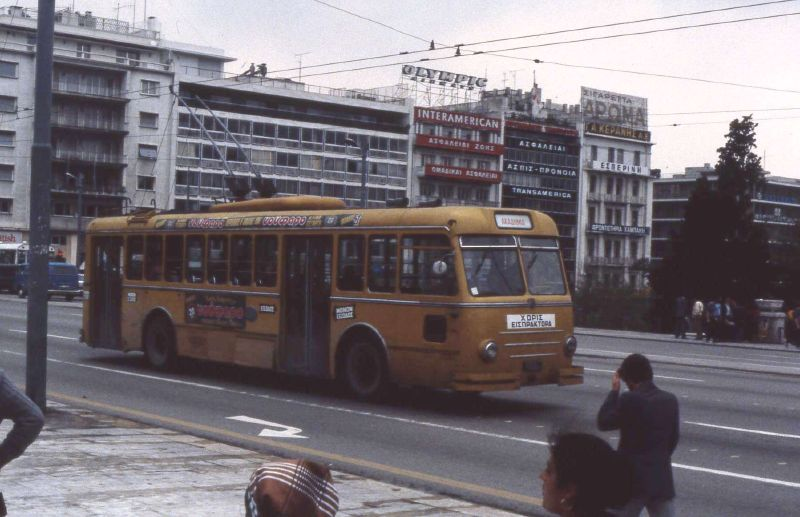
Lancia trolleybus in Athens

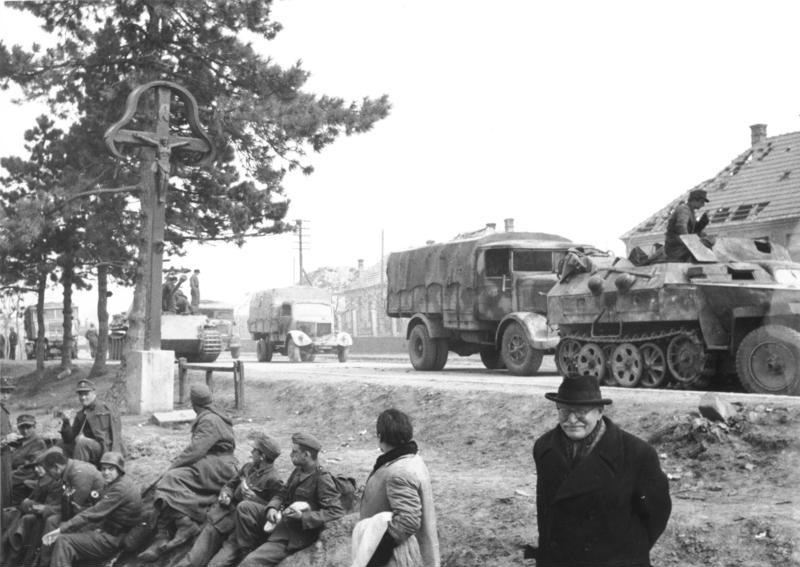
Lancia 3RO military truck

- 1915 Lancia Jota
- 1915 Lancia Djota
- 1921 Lancia Triota
- 1921 Lancia Tetrajota
- 1924 Lancia Pentajota
- 1926 Lancia Esajota
- 1927 Lancia Eptajota
- 1932 Lancia Ro
- 1935 Lancia Ro-Ro
- 1938 Lancia 3Ro
- 1943 Lancia Esaro
- 1941 Lancia E290 electric truck, 202 built (E290 & E291) (La Lancia 3rd Ed, p. 431, Wim Oude Weerink)
- 1947 Lancia 6Ro
- 1947 Lancia Esatau
- 1957 Lancia Esatau B
- 1959 Lancia Esadelta
- 1963 Lancia Esadelta B
- 1967 Lancia Esadelta C
- 1969 Lancia Esagamma

=== Buses ===
- 1919 Lancia Eptaiota
- 1920 Lancia Trijota (bus)
- 1922 Lancia Tetraiota
- 1925 Lancia Pentaiota
- 1927 Lancia Omicron
- 1934 Lancia Ro (bus)
- 1947 Lancia Esatau (bus)
- 1949 Lancia Esatau (bus) V11
- 1953 Lancia Esatau (bus) V81
- 1957 Lancia Esatau (bus) 703
- 1964 Lancia Esagamma (bus) 715/718

==== Trolleybuses ====
- 1951 Lancia Esatau Pistoiesi
- 1956 Lancia Esatau Piaggio Ansaldo
- 1961 Lancia Esatau V.11 (trolleybus)
- 1966 Lancia Diafa trolleybus
- 1967 Lancia Bimax
- 1968 Lancia Bimax F600
- 1968 Lancia Pistoiesi
- 1969 Lancia Menarini Monocar
- 1969 Lancia Esatau P Casaro

=== Military vehicles ===
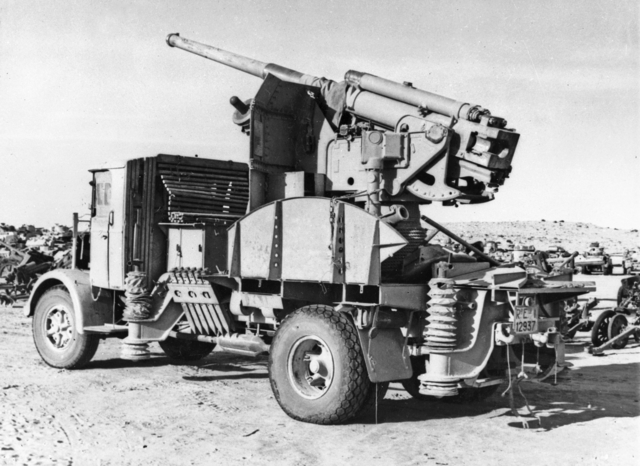
Cannone da 90/53 on a Lancia truck

- 1912 Lancia 1Z (light truck)
- 1912 Lancia 1ZM (armoured car)
- 1938 Lancia 3Ro (truck)
- 1942 Lancia Esaro (truck)
- 1942 Lancia Lince (armoured car)
- 1948 Lancia Esatau 6RoM (truck)
- 1951 Lancia CL51 (Z 20) (troop transporter)
- 1954 Lancia TL51 (Z 30) (truck)
- 1960 Lancia 506 (truck)
- 1975 Lancia ACL 75 (6611 M) (truck)
- 1990 Lancia ACL 90 (truck, later Iveco) (truck)

=== Tractor ===
- 1947 Lancia 3Ro (based on Fiat)

=== Other ===
- 2007 Lancia Bike
- 2009 Lancia di Lancia speedboat

== Engines ==
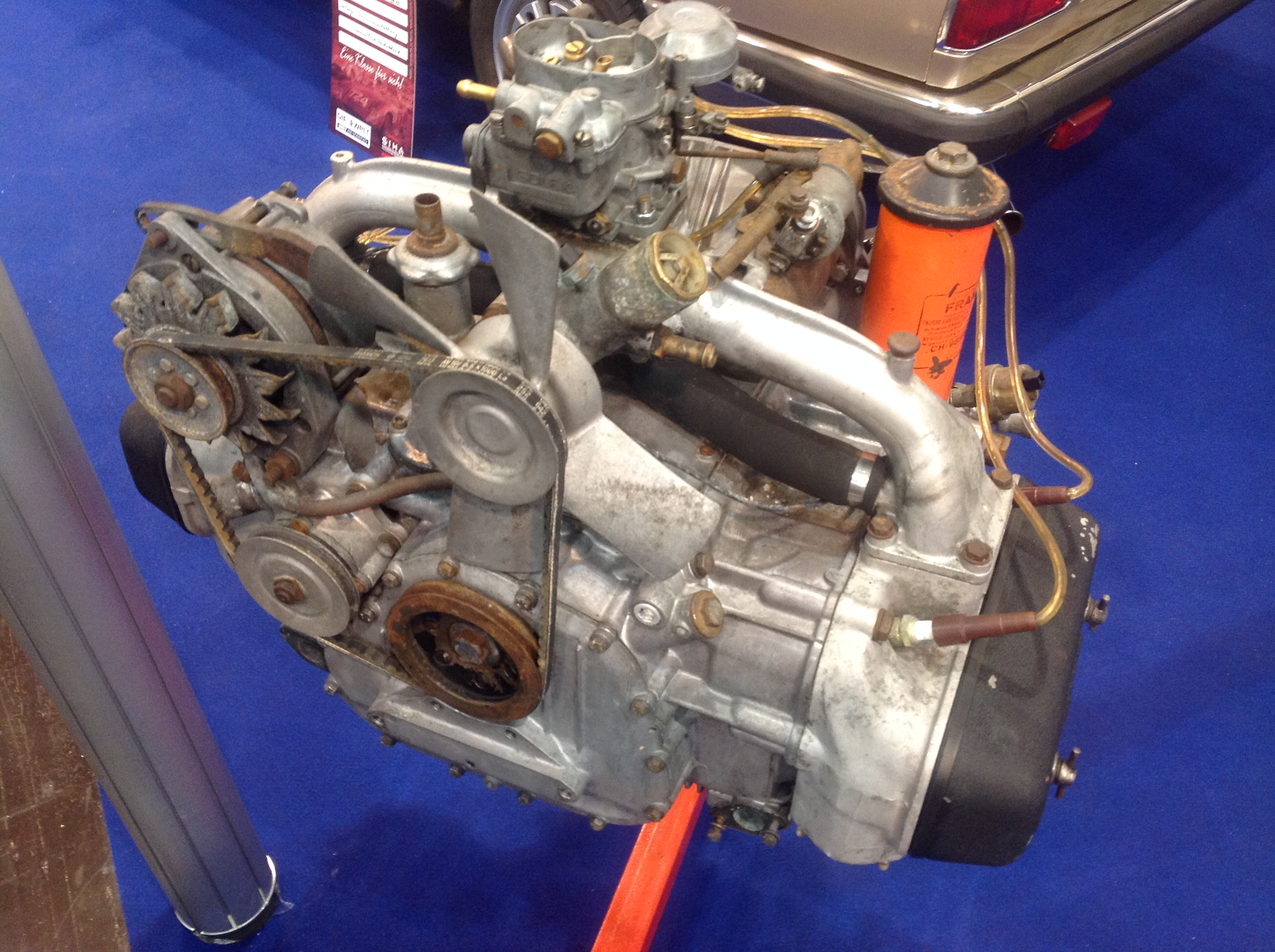
Lancia Flavia Flat four

- Lancia Flat-4 engine
- Lancia V4 engine
- Lancia V6 engine
- Lancia V8 engine
- Lancia Tipo 4

== Logo ==
1907

From 1907 to 1910 Lancia cars didn't bear a true badge, but rather a brass plaque identifying the manufacturer (Lancia & C.) and chassis code; although some models did have a brass Lancia script on the grille.

1911

The original Lancia logo was designed by Count Carlo Biscaretti di Ruffia. In 1910 Vincenzo Lancia asked Biscaretti di Ruffia to design a badge for the company: the Count submitted six watercolour proposal sketches. Vincenzo Lancia chose a round one, composed by a blue lance and flag bearing a Lancia script ("Lancia" means "lance" in Italian) in gold, over a four-spoke steering wheel, with a hand throttle detail on the right spoke. The first car to bear the Lancia logo was the Gamma 20 HP in 1911.

1929

In 1929 the logo acquired its final layout: the previous round badge was superimposed on a blue shield in the shape of a Reuleaux triangle (as found in one of Biscaretti di Ruffia's six original proposals). Though first applied on the 1929 Dikappa, this badge was only used consistently starting with the 1936 Aprilia.

1957

Beginning with the 1957 Flaminia, Lancia cars switched from the traditional vertical split grille to a horizontal, full-width one. The logo was moved inside the grille opening, and changed to a more stylized chromed metal open-work design; shield and steering wheel became chrome frames, the only remaining enameled surface being the blue field of the flag. This new metal logo was used on most models with some exceptions, namely Zagato-bodied Lancia Fulvias and Flavias, the Lancia 2000 Berlina (which reprised the traditional upright grille and the round enameled badge) and the Stratos HF (whose ornaments lacked the triangular shield).

1974

In 1974 the badge was redesigned on Umberto Agnelli's request; it went back to a modernised silver, white and blue version of the 1929 design. Flag and lance were unified in a single shape and dispensed with the earlier minute detailing, the Lancia letters became all of the same size, and the steering wheel became also outlined in blue and lost the hand throttle detail. This logo debuted on the 1979 Lancia Delta, and made its way on the other models as they adopted the split grille introduced by the Delta. Though lightly revised in 2000 with the addition of a chrome shield surround, the 1974 logo was used through four decades, up to 2006.

2007

A redesigned logo, designed by Robilant Associati, was presented at the 2007 Geneva Motor Show—a couple of months after the creation of Lancia Automobiles. While the traditional chrome-framed blue shield has been retained and made three-dimensional, for the first time since 1911 lance and flag are absent; the steering wheel has been stylized into a chromed circle, from which two spikes converge towards the modern Lancia logotype in the centre.

2022

The current logo was unveiled in late 2022, as part of Lancia's newest design language dubbed Pu+Ra. The logo retains the colour scheme of the 2007 logo, while also reinstating and streamlining the flag, circle and lance theme of the 1957 logo.

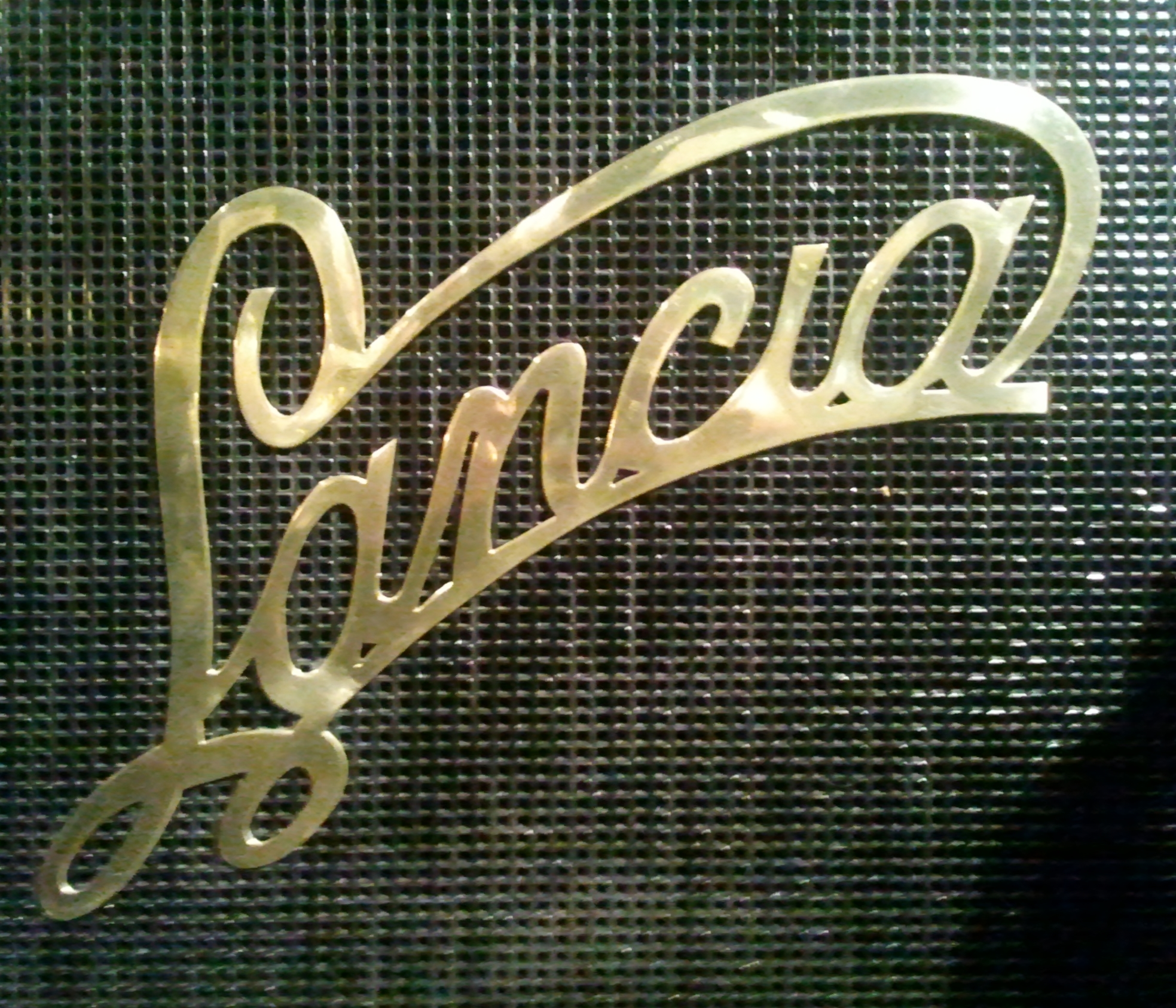
Lancia (1907)

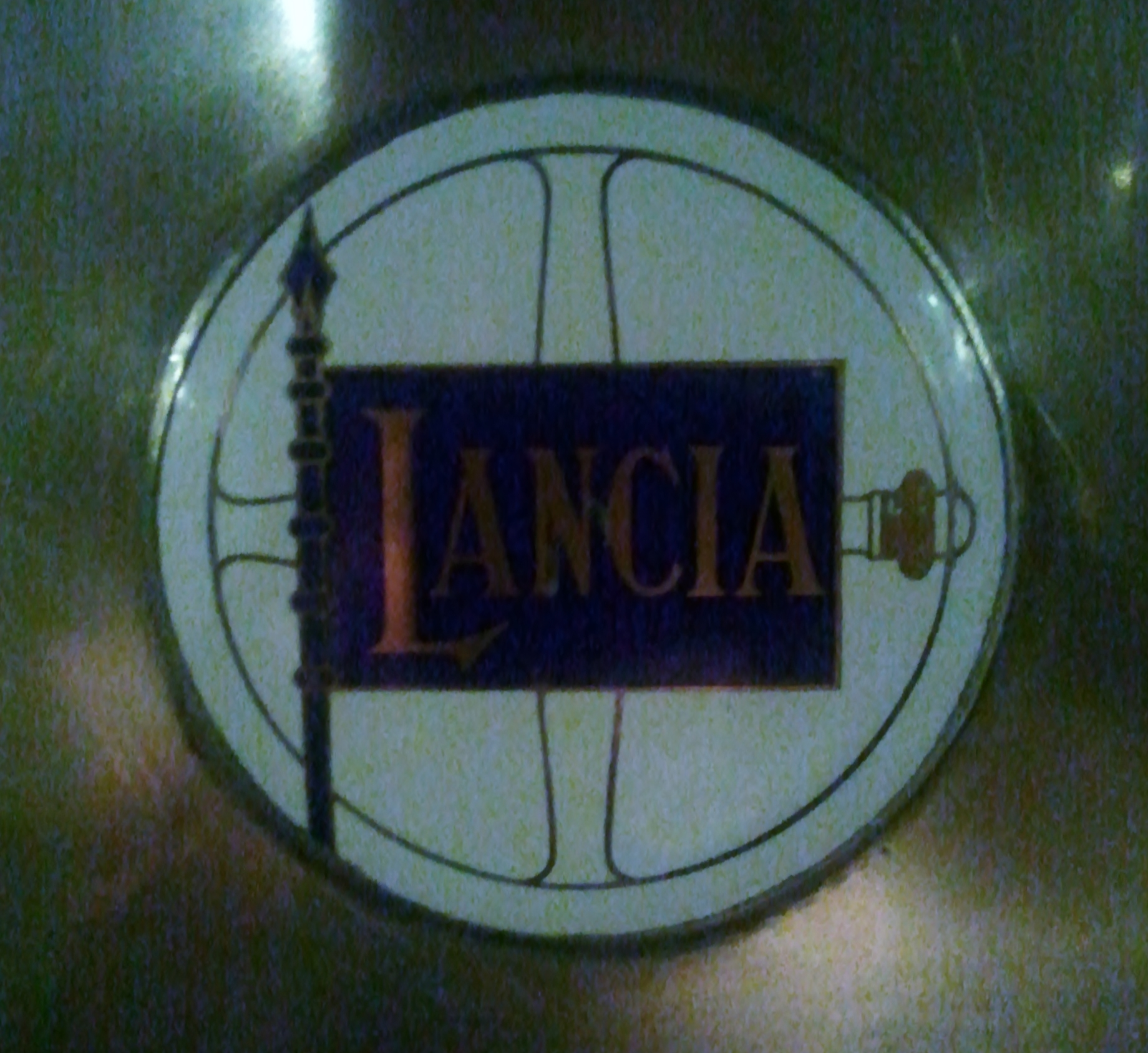
Lancia (1911)

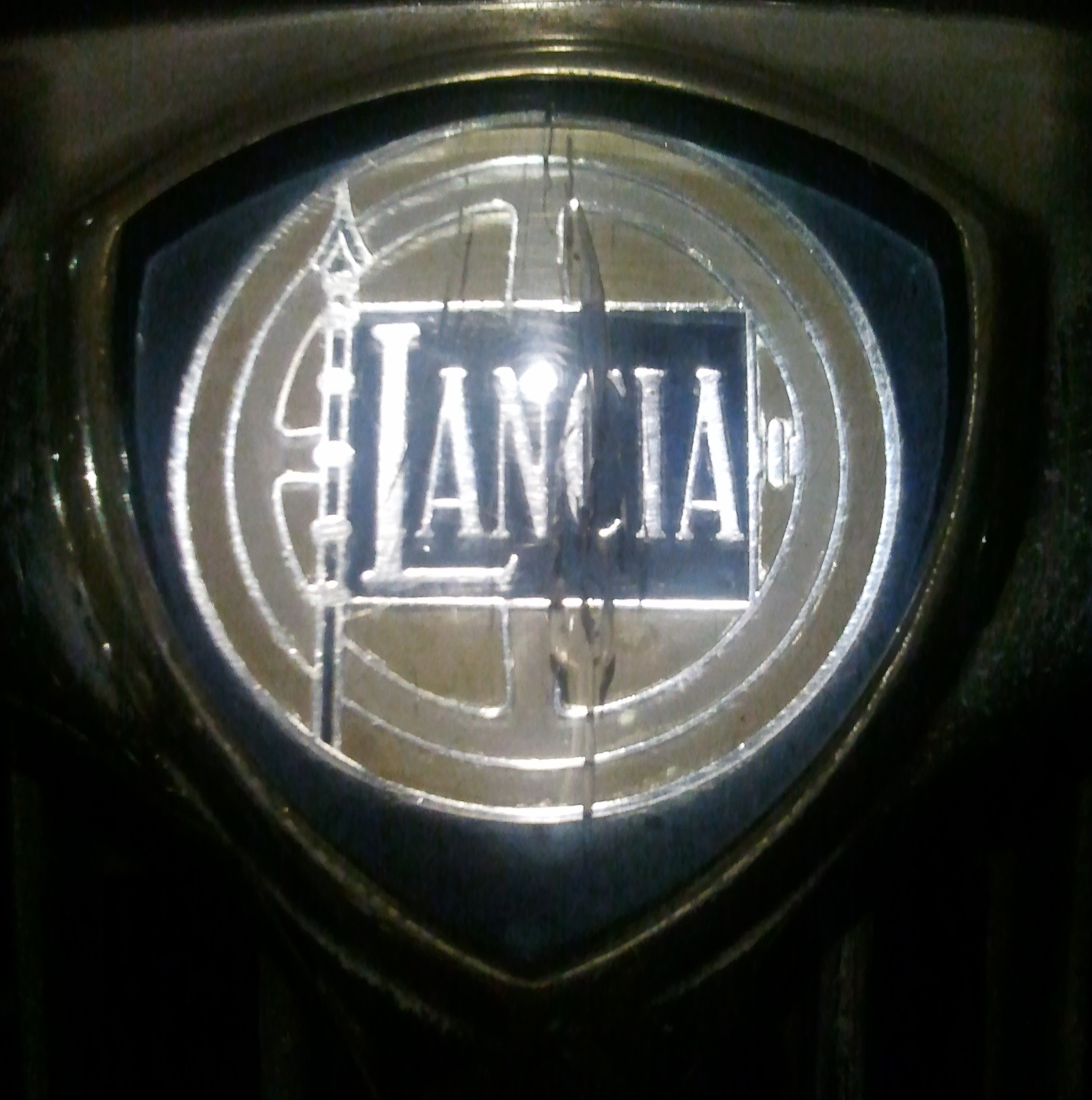
Lancia (1929)

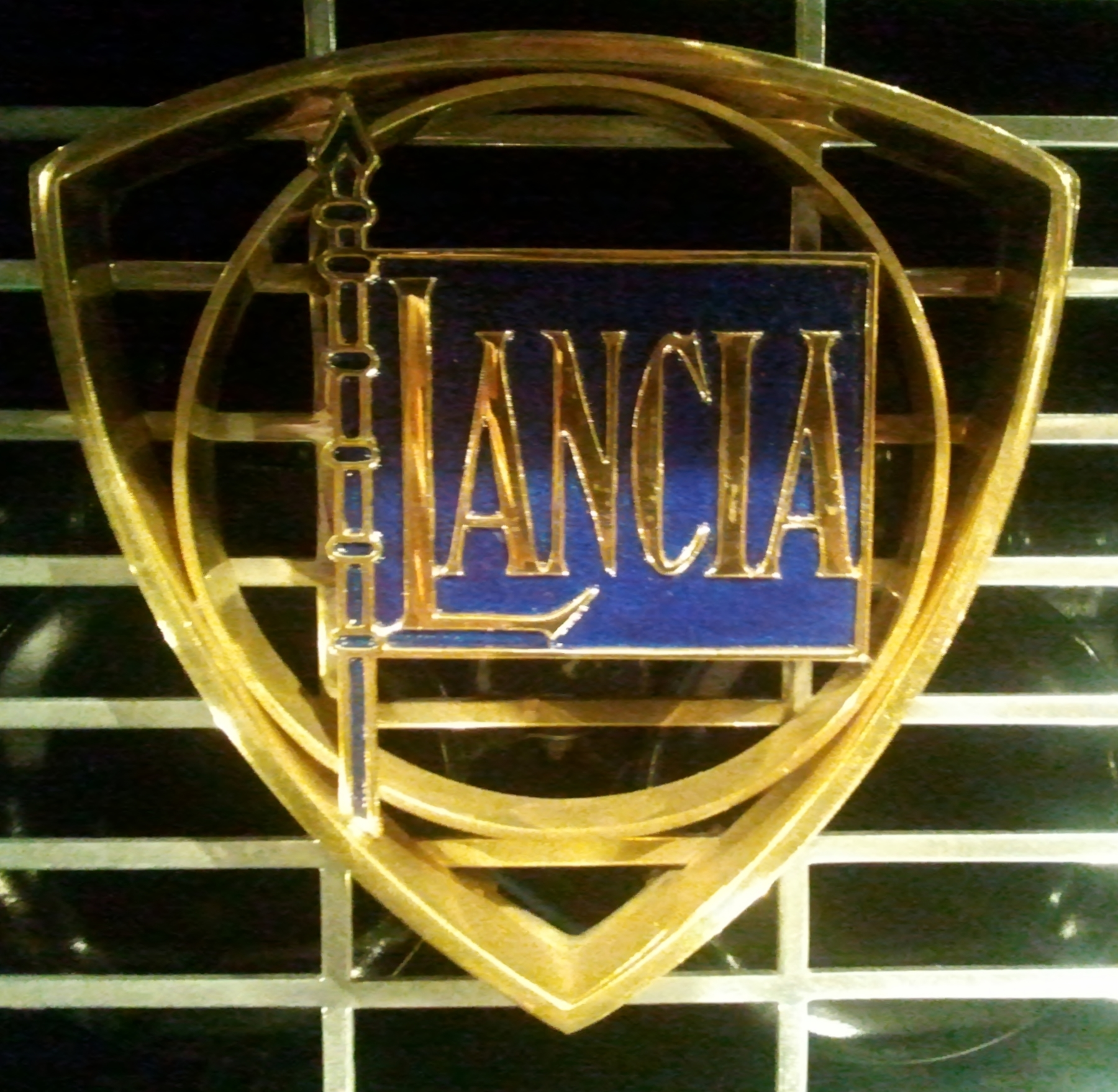
Lancia (1957)

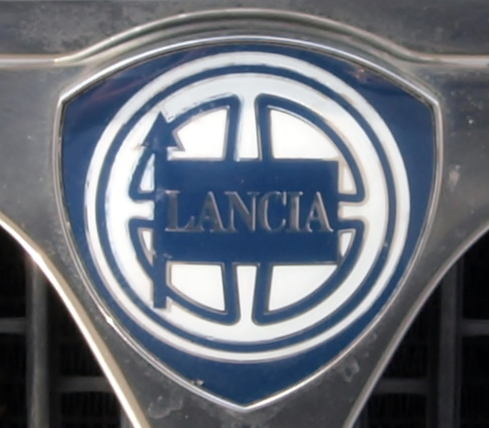
Lancia (1974)

Lancia (2007)

Lancia (2022)

== Media and sponsorship ==
Lancia sponsored the Venice Film Festival for five years, ending in 2012, with the Lancia Thema used to transport stars to the festival. Lancia was sponsor of the ninth and eleventh World Summits of Nobel Peace Prize Laureates.

== Collectors' market ==
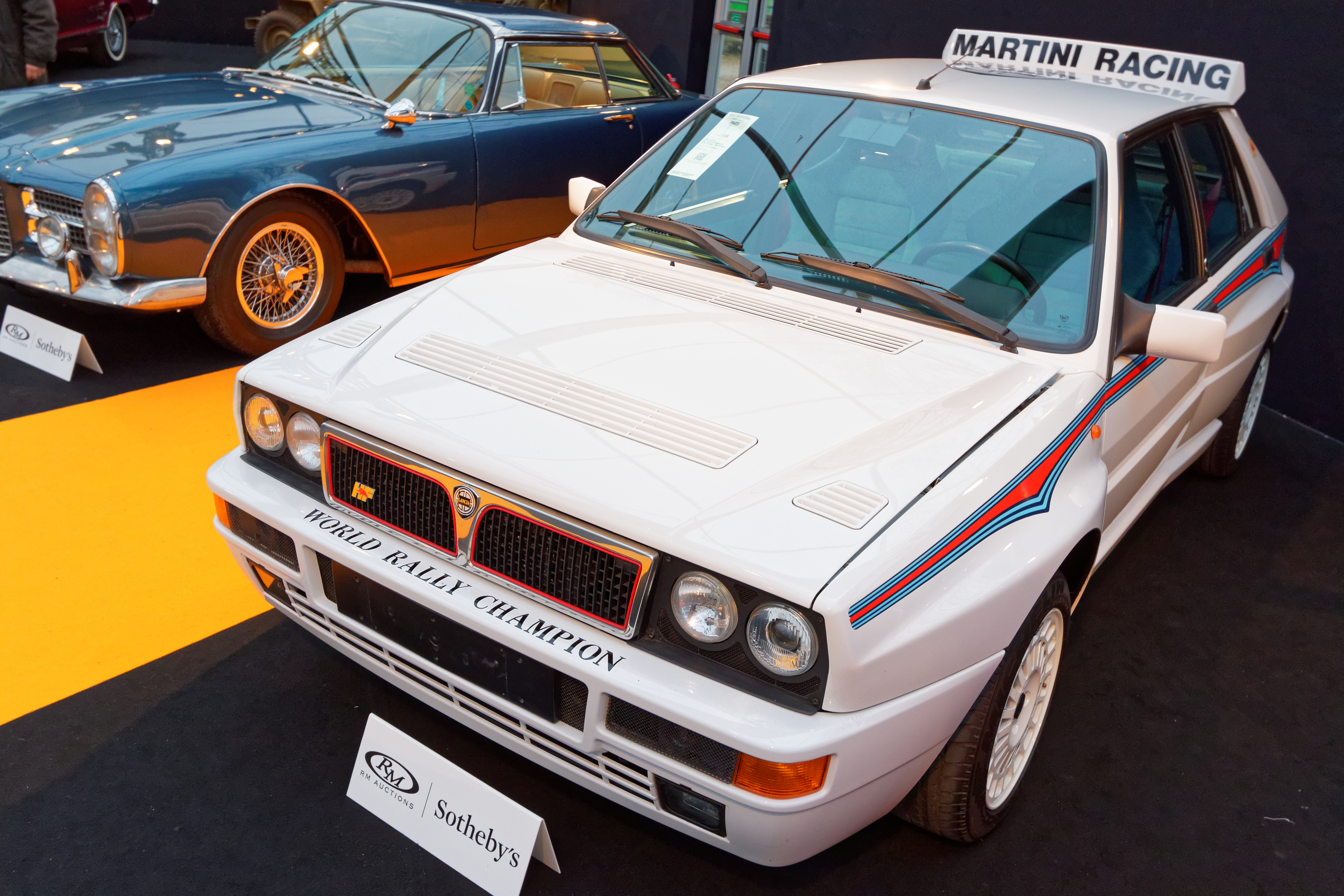
Lancia Delta HF Integrale Evoluzione 1 Martini 6 - 1992 - Paris - RM Sotheby's 2016

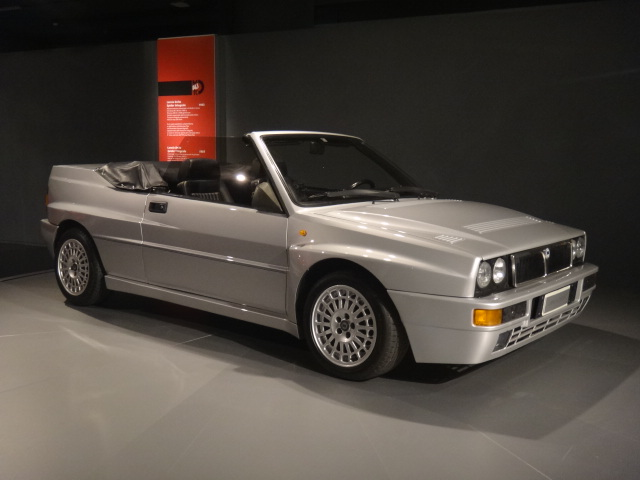
Gianni Agnelli's one-off Delta Spider Integrale on display at Museo Nazionale dell'Automobile

In 2025, the lack of a new model range has not diminished the brand's prestige, some Lancia models have reached considerable prices on the used market for enthusiasts and collectors. In 2025, a Lancia Delta HF Martini was put up for sale for €1,300,000, and Lancia Delta HFs are often offered for sale at an average price of over €200,000. The Lancia Delta HF Integrale Evo 2 owned by Italian footballer Roberto Baggio sold for €230,000. This special car was created to commemorate the famous Italian footballer's historic Ballon d'Or victory in 1993. Italian singer Vasco Rossi also put his 1992 Lancia Delta HF Integrale 16v Evoluzione “Martini Speciale” up for sale, and it was purchased for €201,250. While 1989 Lancia Delta HF Integrale 8V Group A, driven by Miki Biasion is sold by RM Sotheby's for €485,000 - €550,000. Among the collectors and admirers of the brand was also the owner of Fiat and Lancia, Gianni Agnelli, who had two custom-made Lancia Delta HF Integrale Evo made for him, one of which was a convertible called the Lancia Delta Integrale Evo Spider. Gianni Agnelli also owned other Lancia cars, custom-built for him, such as the 1985 Lancia Thema Station Wagon produced by Zagato, which will also be auctioned by RM Sotheby's in 2025, along with two of his other Fiat cars, the 1974 Fiat 130 Familiare and the 1986 Fiat Panda 4×4, and the special 1987 Lancia Prisma, a sedan version of the Lancia Delta. This car had been prepared by Abarth and had been repainted in an elegant blue (Blu Maestrale), to better camouflage it as a production model, from the original red produced by the factory for him. The car was a special version, a one-off with unique features, from the interior to the engine and traction. The interior was upholstered in Connolly leather with burl wood trim and a Nardi sports steering wheel. The engine, mechanics, and traction were derived from the Delta HF integrale "8V"; the engine was a 2.0 Turbo with 200 HP and all-wheel drive. Gianni Agnelli's car collection also boasted a Lancia Delta S4 Stradale.

== See also ==
- List of automobile manufacturers
- List of Formula One constructors
- List of Italian companies
- List of World Rally Championship Constructors' Champions
- Martini Racing
