= Lancia Beta (van) =

The Lancia Beta "Autocarro" is a small commercial vehicle produced by the Italian company Lancia between 1950 and 1961. It was sold as the Z10 short wheelbase and Z11 long wheelbase model, and a rarer three-axle Z12 version.

Three wheelbases were created, the short-wheelbase Z10, long-wheelbase Z11, and the Z12 three-axle. The forward control Beta had several variants, included as a pickup, van, minibus, and ambulance. 6,700 units total were produced.

The Beta was launched with an innovative U-shaped four-cylinder engine, with a 1.9 litre (1908 cc) capacity producing 48 bhp (36 kW; 49 PS). In 1953, a new 2.0 litre (1963 cc) two-cylinder two-stroke engine built under licence from Detroit Diesel was available, producing 42 bhp (31 kW; 43 PS).

== Beta 190 ==
The 190 is a light commercial vehicle with two seats and designed for carrying light goods. It uses a body from coachbuilders Viberti. This version of the vehicle has an engine rated at 35HP and a maximum speed of 52km/h. The truck had a version with a tilt back for transporting products. It was used for transport in the milk system in north part of Italy.

The 190 featured a 190cm wide cabin (thus the designation of 190). Since it was so mechanically different from other Lancia models it was discontinued in 1961.
