= Lancia Omicron =

Lancia Omicron is a bus chassis produced by the Italian manufacturer Lancia. Production of the Omicron started in 1927 and ended in 1936 after 601 total models were built.

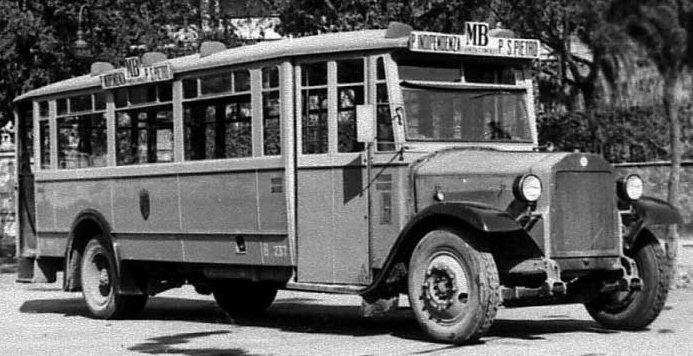
Lancia Omicron in Rome

== History ==
This chassis was fitted with many different body types, a short and long versions for urban use, as well as a double-decker version.

The bus was used for long trips and it was very luxurious for the beginning of the 1930s. The bus is used in the deserts for long journeys to connect places in north African countries such as Sudan and Algeria.

Advertising of the Omicron chassis in the UK promoted its high load capacity, including a test to demonstrate the chassis carrying eight tons of steel ingots and hauling five laden trailers, a total weight of over 50 tons.

== Models ==
The Omicron chassis was available in three versions; the C and L, both with two-axles, and a three-axles option. The Omicron C had an 8300mm wheelbase, and the Omicron L had a longer wheelbase of 9530mm or 9850mm. Urban bus routes such as Rome and Tivoli used two-door bodies coach-built by Macchi and Carminati. The six-cylinder Lancia 77 engine powered most models with 92 hp or 96 hp outputs.

The first diesel engine for that was made in 1934 and showed the innovation from Lancia vehicles.
