= Lancia Trijota (bus) =

The Lancia Trijota is one of the first buses produced by the Italian vehicle manufacturer Lancia. The bus was produced from 1921 to 1925.

== Characteristics ==
The bus had an engine with 55 hp and maximum speed of 40 km/h. The length of the bus is 6 meters, the height is two meters and the width is 2.50 meters. The weight of the bus is 6,7 metric tonnes.

The bus had only one single version and used for a public, private, or tourist transport. The bus had one door and two available wheelbases. It had 26 seats.

== History ==
The bus was based on the Lancia Jota trucks and transformed to a bus. The Trijota was used for public transport in Milan, Turin, and other places at the beginning of the twenties. Along with the buses of Fiat and Officine Meccaniche these was the first quality buses used in Italy. Around 100 Trijota buses were produced.

=== Users ===
ATM-Milan
ATAG-Rome
GTT-Turin
