= Lancia E290 =

Lancia E290 is an Italian electric truck produced from 1941 to 1947 from Lancia.

== History ==
The truck is used during 2nd World War.

== Technical characteristic ==
The maximum speed on the truck is 30 km/h (19 mph) and the transmission is 4x2. The emissions are 0 g/km. The weight of the Lancia E290 is around 5 t.

== Production ==
From the electric version 61 examples were produced. In total 202 electric trucks were built (E290 + E291). After the war, some were modified to run with petrol engines.
