= Lancia di Lancia =

In 2009 Lancia launched the Lancia di Lancia speedboat at the Venice Film Festival. Built by the Italian boat builder SACS Marine and designed by Christian Grande DesignWorks.

The boat has a 6.7-liter common rail turbo diesel engine developed by Fiat Powertrain, producing a total of 1120 hp and producing a top speed of 48 knots.
