= Lancia Ro (bus) =

The Lancia Ro is a bus produced from 1952 to 1955.

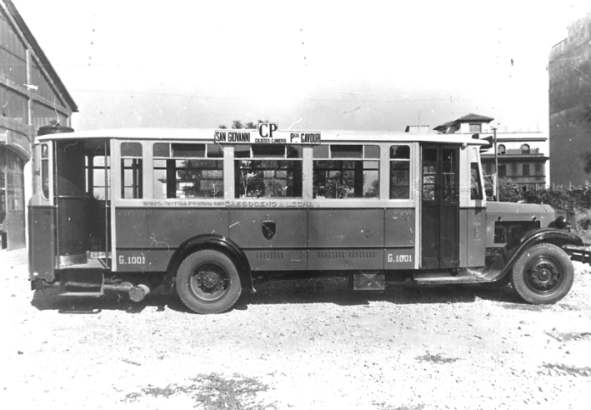
Lancia 3Ro

The bus had only one door with 32 seats. The successor of the bus is the Lancia Esagamma. The bus was used to transport people over long distances. The weight of the bus is 8 tonnes and had length of 7 meters.

== History ==
This bus had the new design of the Italian buses in that time. It was used like a tourist bus and had a place for luggage on the top of the bus. The seats were comfortable and made the trip better.
