= Lancia 140 =

Italian trolleybus produced by Lancia

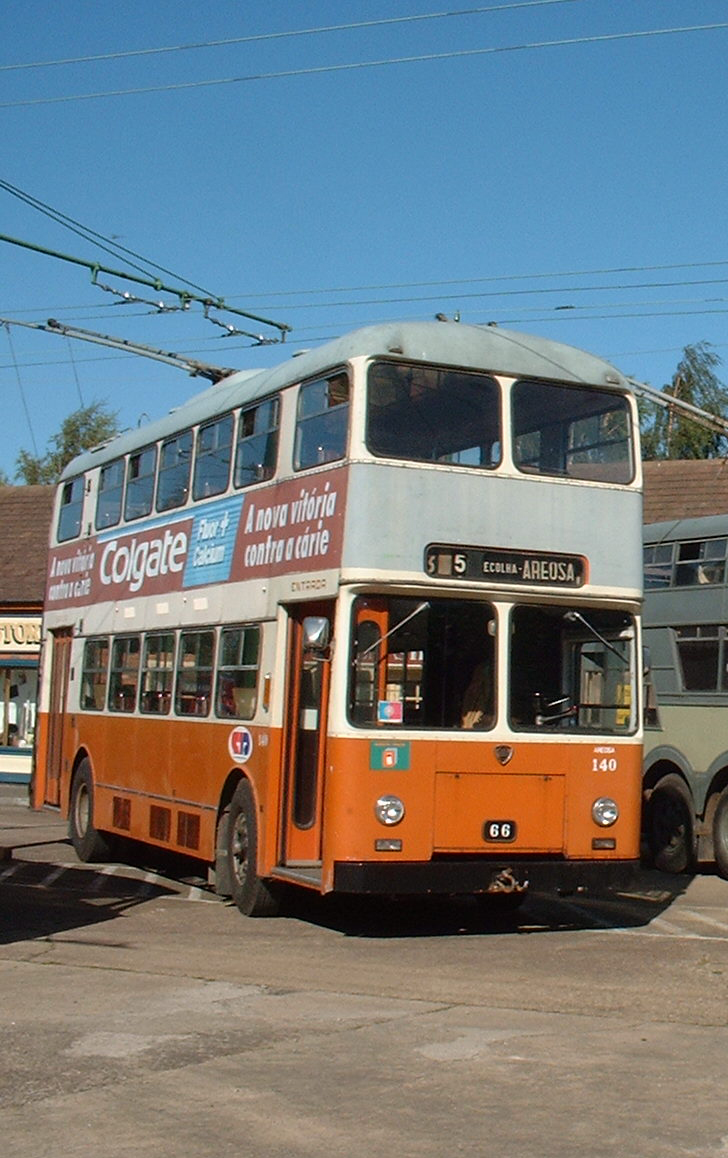
Lancia 140 trolleybus

Lancia 140 is an Italian trolleybus produced from 1967 to 1968. The vehicles are double decker. Until 1995 trolleybuses of this model were used in Porto, Portugal. This trolleybus had two doors. The electrical equipment was from CGE, and the body, with 58 seats, from Dalfa. 50 units were built.

== Technical characteristics ==
The buses use an electric motor with 130 hp (97 kW) and they had maximum speed of 72 km/h (45 mph). The length is 8 m (26 ft 3 in) and the single deck version had 20 seats.
