= Lancia Jolly =

Light commercial vehicle by Lancia

Overview
- Manufacturer: Lancia
- Production: 1959–1963

Dimensions
- Wheelbase: 2,480 mm (97.6 in)

The Lancia Jolly was a light commercial vehicle produced by the Italian vehicle manufacturer Lancia between 1959 and 1963. In four years, 3011 units were produced.

The low-loading Jolly was based on the third series of the Appia passenger car, and was first presented alongside it in early 1959. Its predecessors had used the Appia bodywork, including the front doors, but for the Jolly, Lancia decided to use a cab over design instead. It was available with van or pick-up bodywork. An entirely different version with a bigger engine using Flavia mechanicals, called the Super Jolly, replaced it in 1964.

The code name of the Jolly was 809.

In 2025, Iveco revealed the Iveco Jolly and Iveco SuperJolly, reusing the name of the Lancia vehicle.

== Technical characteristics ==
The Jolly was powered by a four-cylinder, 1,090 cc engine producing 36.5 hp (26.8 kW). The maximum speed was 97 km/h (60 mph).

It was 4,595 mm (180.9 in) long, 1,815 mm (71.5 in) wide, with a height of 1,902 mm (74.9 in). It weighed 1,500 kg (3,300 lb).
