= Lancia Gamma =

Executive car manufactured by Fiat

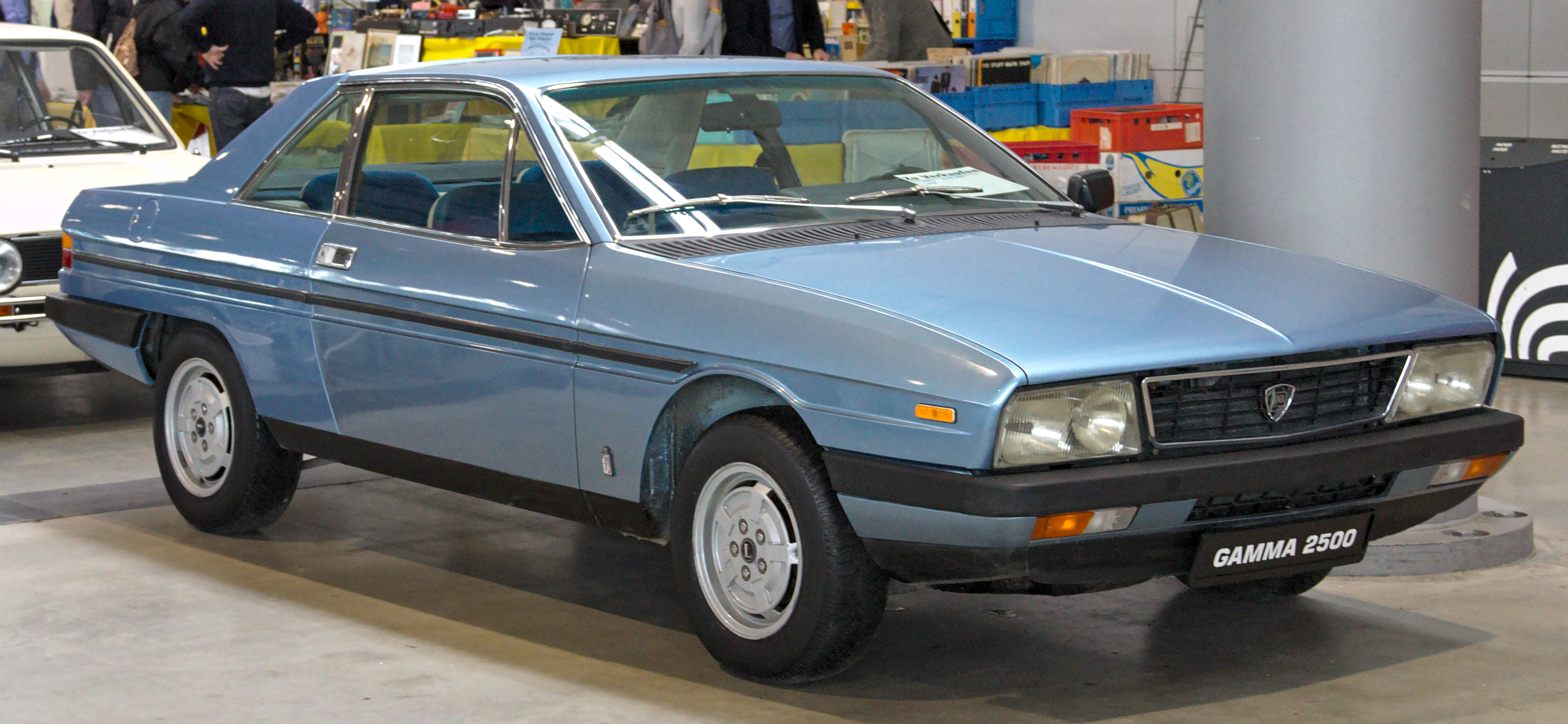
- Lancia Gamma Coupe

Overview
- Manufacturer: Lancia
- Production: 1976–1984
- Assembly: Italy: Turin
- Designer: Leonardo Fioravanti at Pininfarina (saloon); Aldo Brovarone at Pininfarina (coupé)

Body and chassis
- Class: Executive car (E)
- Body style: 4-door fastback saloon (berlina); 2-door coupé
- Layout: Front-engine, front-wheel-drive
- Related: Lancia Beta

Powertrain
- Engine: 2.0 L Lancia H4; 2.5 L Lancia H4
- Transmission: 5-speed manual; 4-speed automatic

Dimensions
- Wheelbase: 2,670 mm (105.1 in) - berlina 2,555 mm (100.6 in) - coupé
- Length: 4,580 mm (180.3 in) - berlina; 4,485 mm (176.6 in) - coupé
- Width: 1,730 mm (68.1 in)
- Height: 1,410 mm (55.5 in) - berlina; 1,330 mm (52.4 in) - coupé
- Curb weight: 1,320 kg (2,910 lb) - berlina; 1,290 kg (2,844 lb) - coupé

Chronology
- Predecessor: Lancia 2000
- Successor: Lancia Thema

The Lancia Gamma (Tipo 830), stylised Lancia γ, is an executive car (E-segment in Europe) manufactured and marketed by the Lancia subdivision of Fiat. Following its debut at the 1976 Geneva Motor Show as Lancia's new flagship, the Gamma was marketed as a 4-door fastback saloon known as the Berlina (1976–1984) and as a 2-door coupé (1977–1984), both designed by Pininfarina – with 15,272 and 6,790 manufactured, respectively. The Gamma superseded the Lancia 2000. The Gamma nameplate will be revived as a crossover SUV in 2026.

== Design ==
The Lancia Gamma saloon was designed at the Pininfarina design studio by Leonardo Fioravanti, under the direction of Centro Stile Lancia's Sergio Camuffo. Early design proposals with different rear portion were created by Aldo Brovarone, who would later design the coupé version. Fioravanti based the design on the 1967 Pininfarina BMC 1800 Aerodynamica concept car designed by Paolo Martin, to which Fioravanti also contributed.

The fastback style of the Berlina featured a conventional boot at the rear, rather than a hatchback. At the car's press launch, Pininfarina said a hatchback was avoided to save the inconvenience to back seat passengers, when luggage is loaded, from ostensible drafts.

== Etymology ==
Gamma is the third letter of the Greek alphabet. Lancia had used Greek letters to denote its models before 1945, and the nomenclature was revived with the Lancia Beta in 1971, the first Lancia developed under Fiat supervision. The Gamma is also shared front-wheel drive and suspension elements from the Beta.

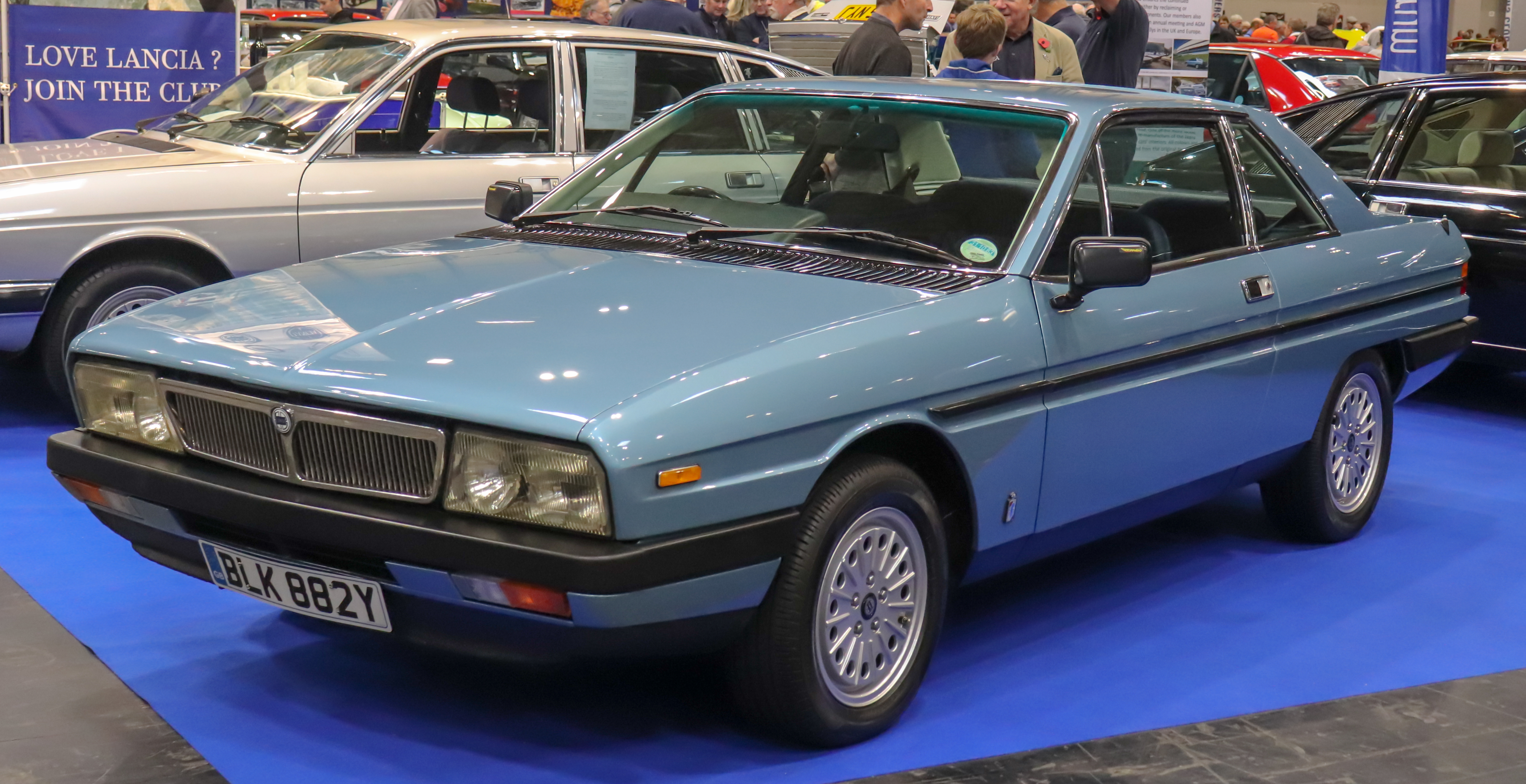
Lancia Gamma Coupé (front)

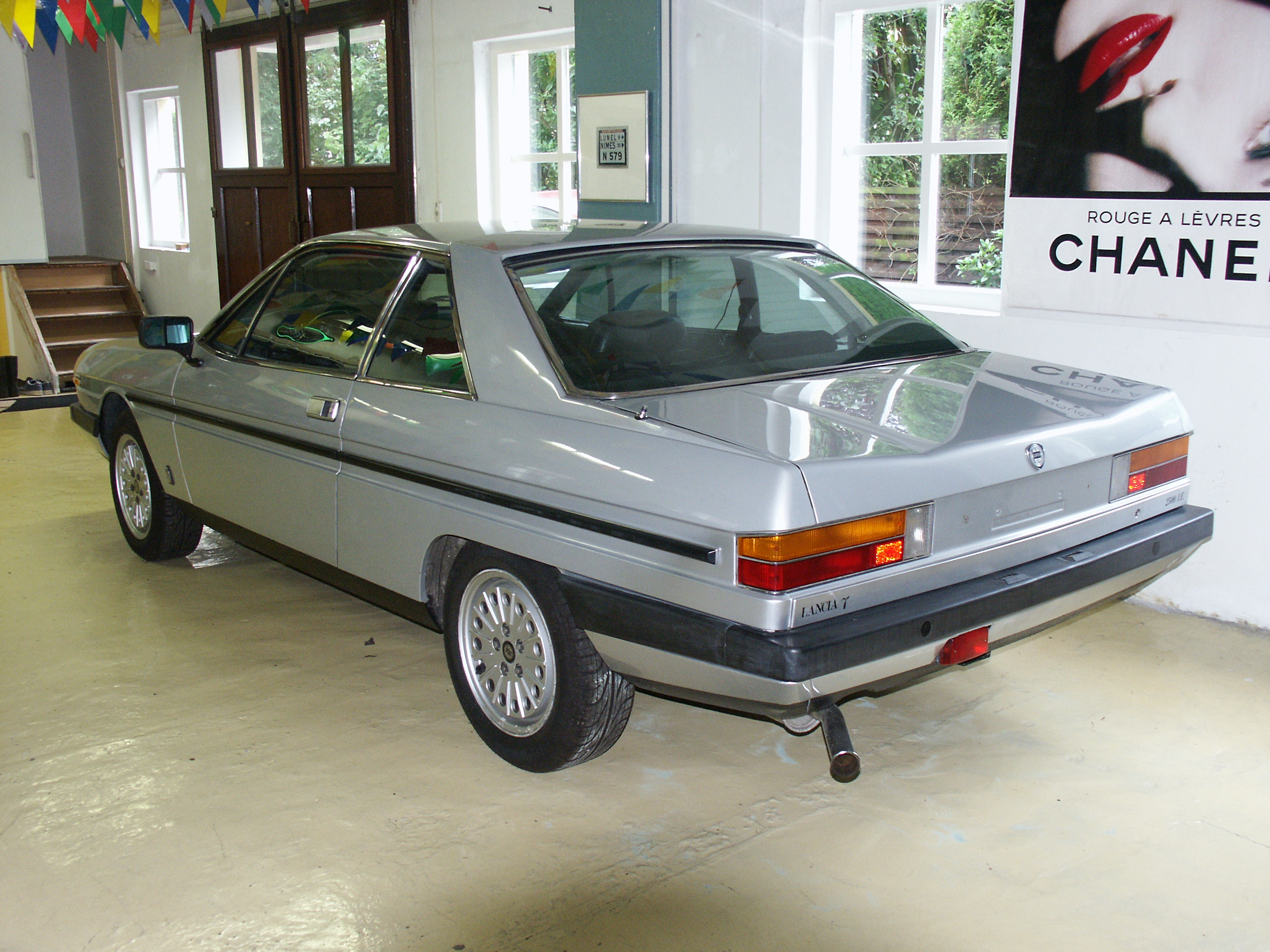
Lancia Gamma Coupé (rear)

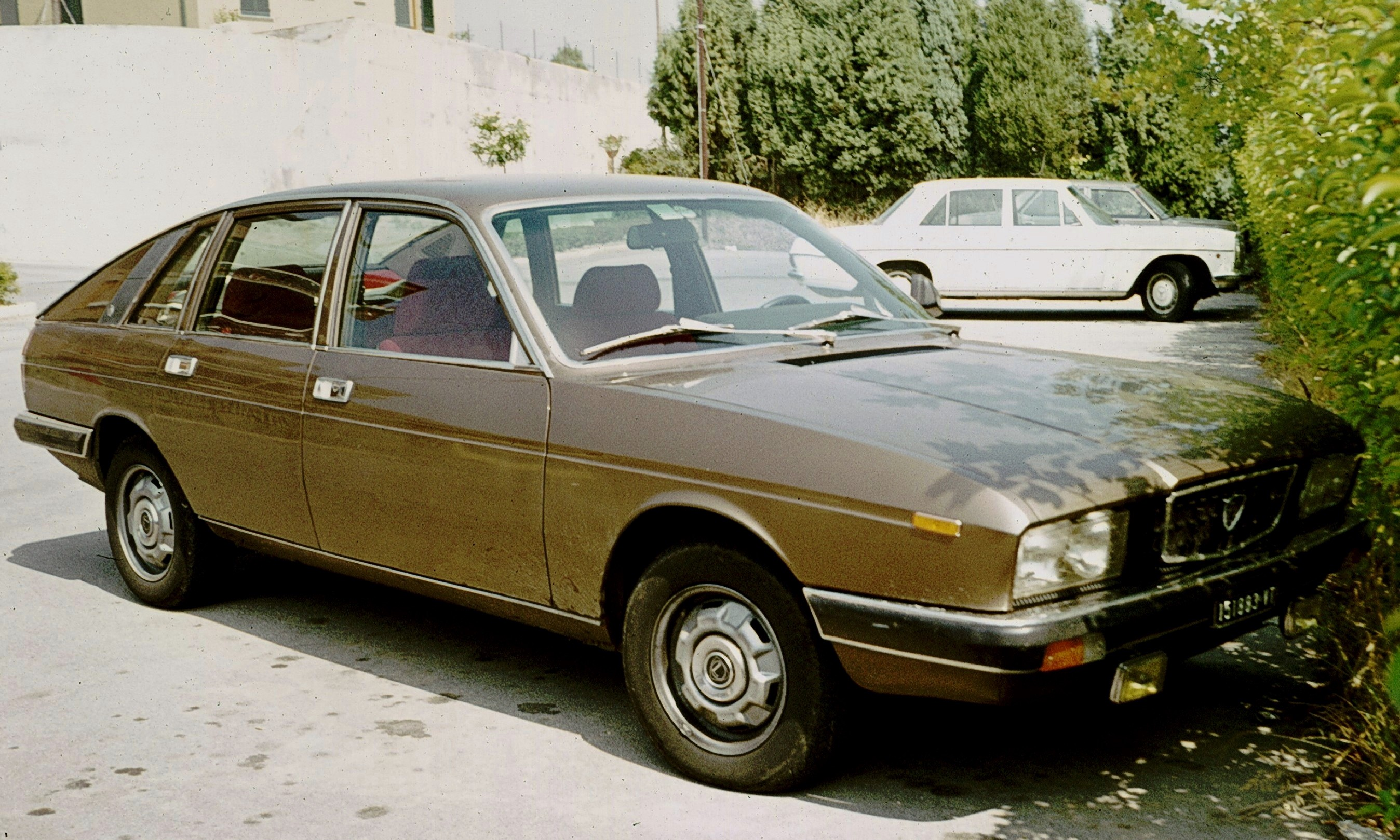
Lancia Gamma Berlina (front)

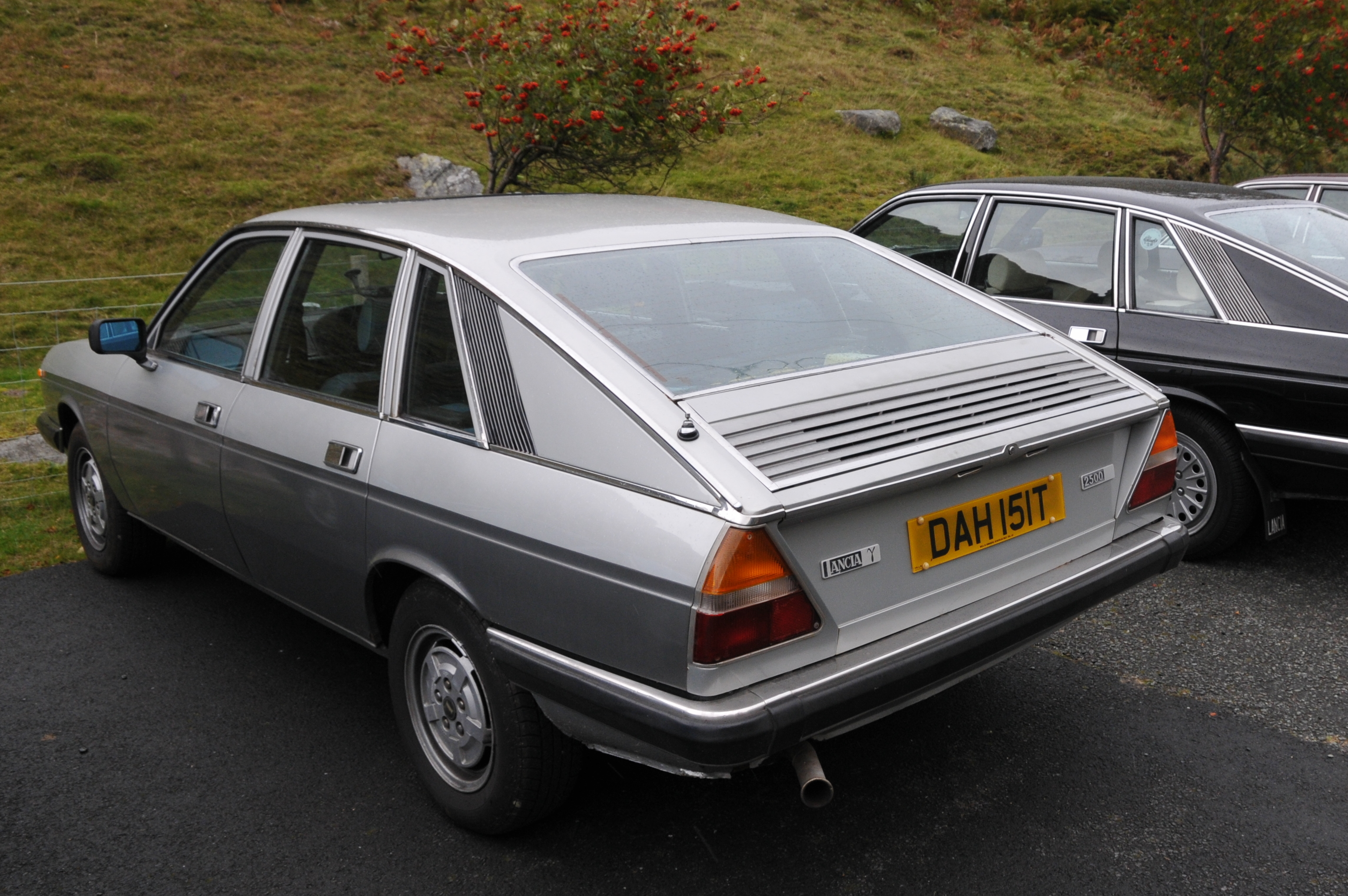
Lancia Gamma Berlina (rear)

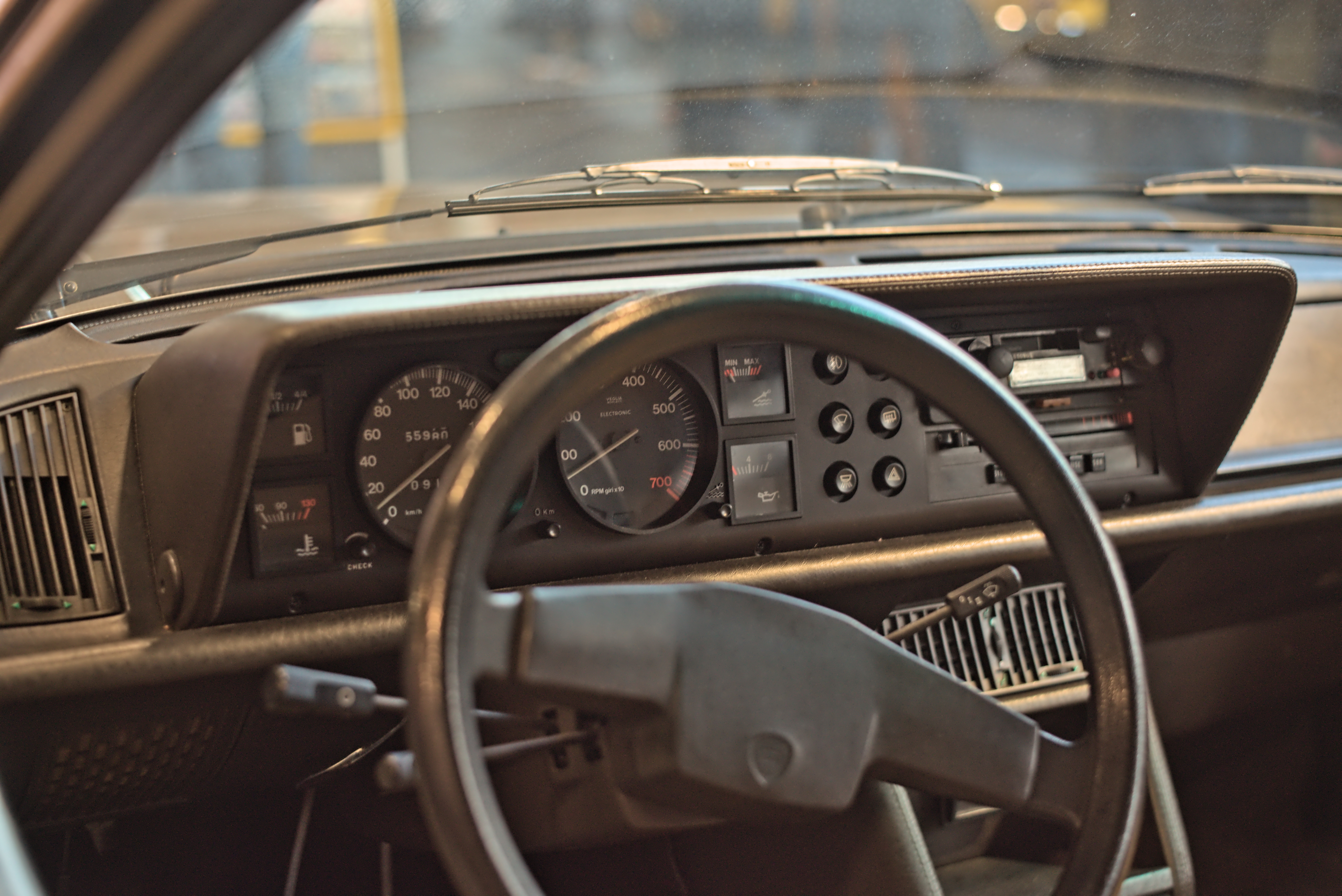
Dashboard of a Lancia Gamma

== Engines ==
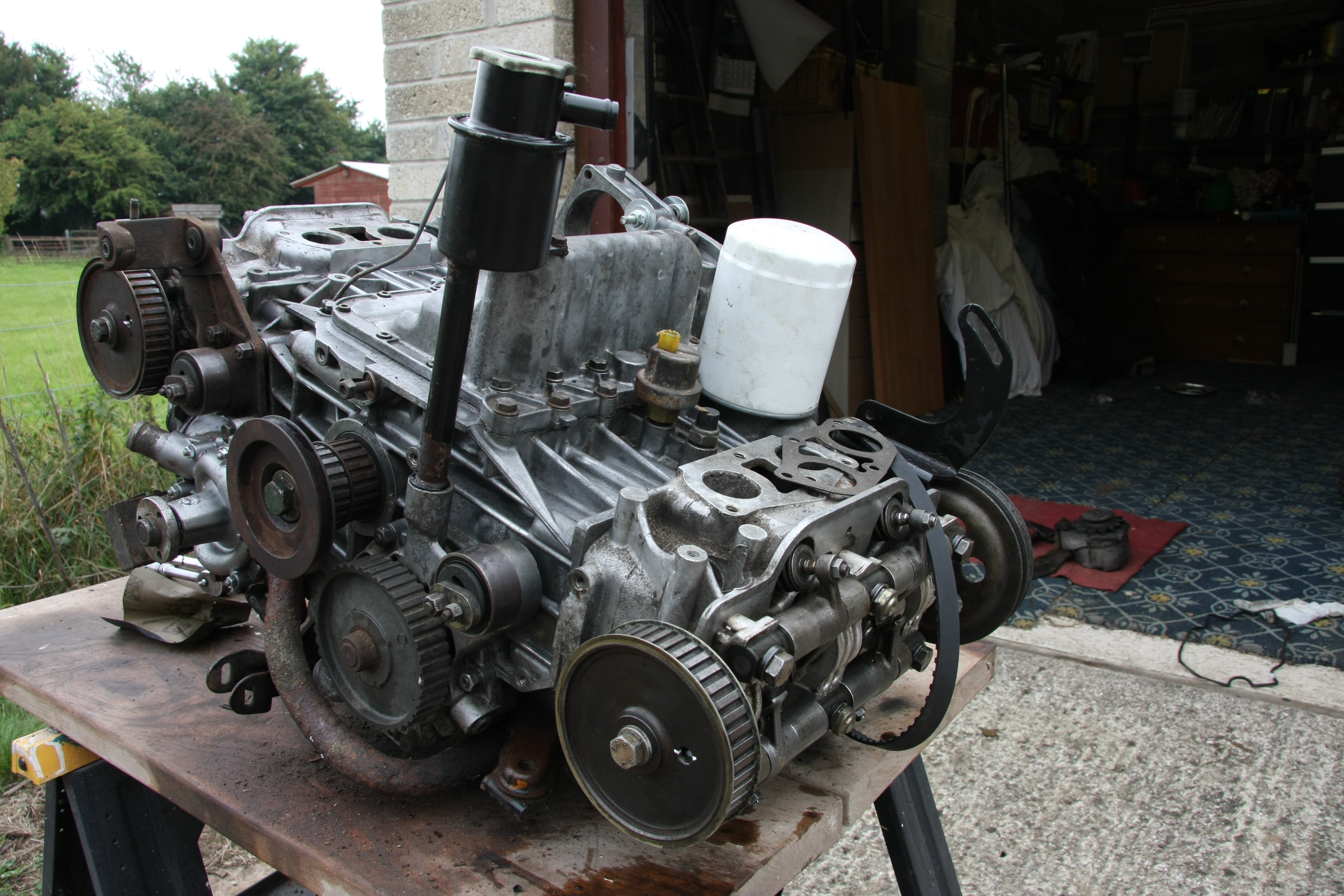
A Lancia Gamma flat-four engine

The Gamma is a front-wheel-drive car with a longitudinally-mounted boxer engine and a 5-speed manual transmission, later joined by an optional 4-speed automatic transmission. The Gamma received a mid-cycle facelift, receiving Bosch L-Jetronic fuel injection as well as a new corporate grille, 15-inch "sunburst" alloy wheels, and a revised interior with new instrumentation, interior lighting, badging, handbrake, and gear lever gaiter.

Though Fiat had planned to use one of their V6 engines, Lancia developed unique flat-four engines for the Gamma. The Flavia and Flavia Coupé had used 1.8 and 2.0 litre flat-fours and the Lancia 2000 used the 2.0-litre version. Engine designer De Virgilio also drew up a four-cam V6 engine for the Gamma with either 3- or 4-litre displacement, but this never came to fruition.

The flat engine, though large for a modern four-cylinder petrol engine, lacked the cachet associated with six- and eight-cylinder engines but enabled Pininfarina chief stylist Aldo Brovarone to lower the coupé's bonnet line and to steeply rake its windscreen. Pressure cast in alloy with wet cylinder liners, the engine was light and though it only produced 140 PS (103 kW), 120 PS (88 kW) in 2.0-litre form, 95% of its maximum torque was available at just 2,000 rpm.

Initially available with a displacement of 2.5 L (Gamma 2500), it was later joined by a 2.0 L version (Gamma 2000), which resulted from the Italian tax system (cars with engines larger than 2.0 L were subject to a heavier tax burden). The displacement was lowered by decreasing the bore rather than the stroke of the engine. Both displacements were using Weber carburetors, and the 2.5 L also came in a version fitted with fuel injection (Gamma 2500 I.E.).

The most notorious aspect of the Gamma's engine related to the design of the power steering pump. The Gamma's engine utilized timing belts rather than the timing chains used in older Lancia flat-four models. Also, rather than powering the power steering pump using the traditional accessory belt, it was instead directly connected to the left hand side camshaft on the back of the engine. This created a design flaw in which applying too much load on the power steering pump (such as when starting the engine or turning the wheel to full lock) could cause the timing belt to skip or snap, causing serious damage to the engine.

- 2.0 L (1,999 cc) carburetor 8v SOHC flat-4 - 120 PS (88 kW; 118 hp) (1st series) 115 PS (85 kW; 113 hp) (2nd series)
- 2.5 L (2,484 cc) carburetor 8v SOHC flat-4 - 140 PS (103 kW; 138 hp)
- 2.5 L (2,484 cc) I.E. 8v SOHC flat-4 - 140 PS (103 kW; 138 hp)

Lancia Gamma Coupé production figures*
Series	1976	1977	1978	1979	1980	1981	1982	1983	1984	Totals
1	9	1,006	2,064	1,236						6,790
2				37	1,225	952	176	51	33	6,790

*stated by Pininfarina production records

Lancia Gamma Coupé version figures
	2.0	2.5	2.5 ie	Total
Series 1; 1976-79	1,978	2,337		4,315
Series 2; 1980-84	1,265		1,209	2,474
Total	3,243	3,546		6,789

== Concepts ==
Several concepts were developed from the Gamma Platform over the years:

- 1977 Pininfarina Gamma Spider — a targa top version of coupé.
- 1977 Italdesign Megagamma — a short-nosed MPV (multi-purpose vehicle) hatchback-bodied variant.
- 1980 Pininfarina Gamma Scala — a saloon, based on the coupé but with a regular notchback boot.
- 1981 Saloon — a Berlina-based six-window three-box, notchback saloon variant designed by Centro Stile Lancia.
- 1982 Pininfarina Gamma Olgiata — a three-door shooting brake, based on the coupé; similar in concept to the Lancia Beta HPE.
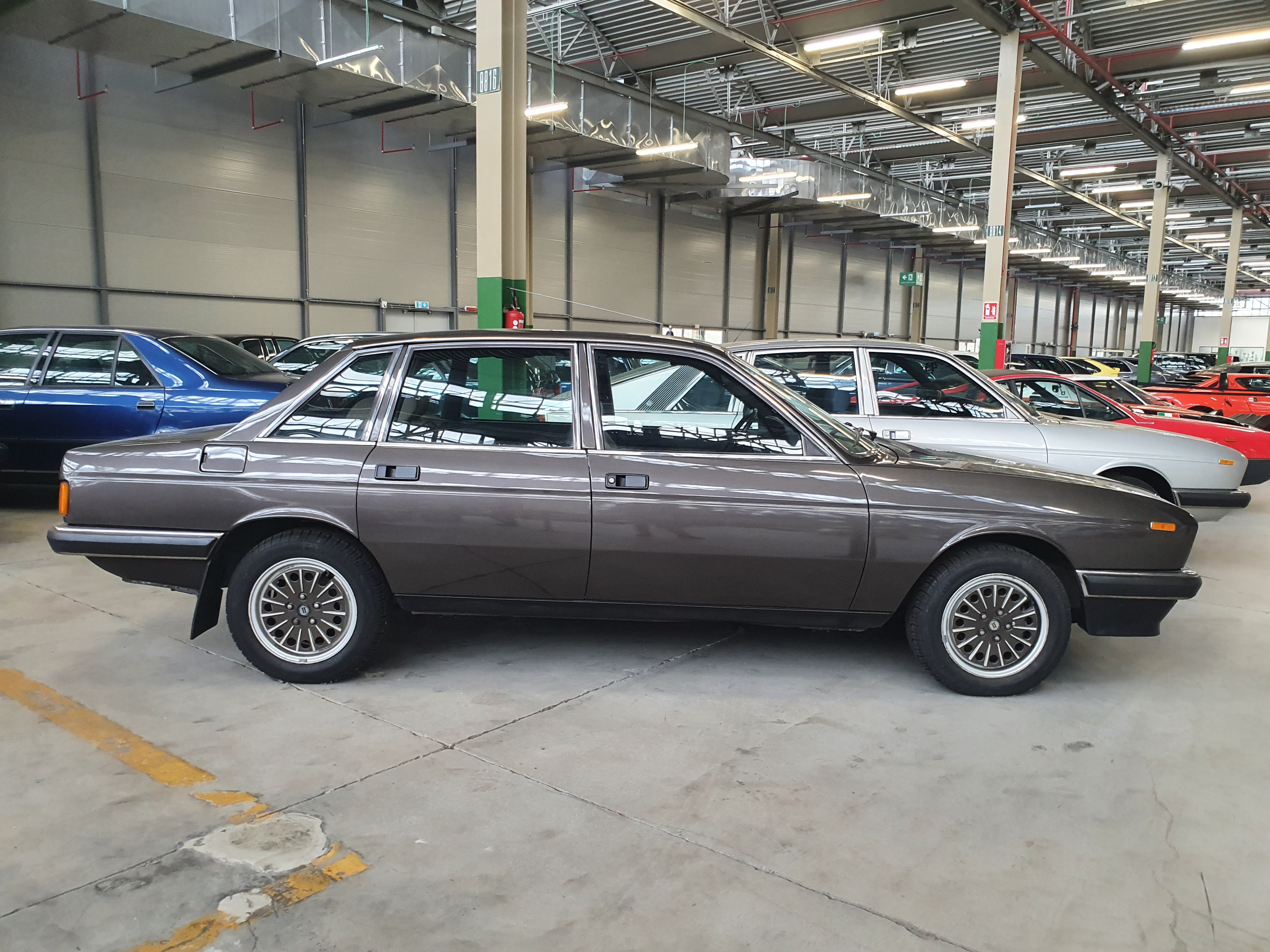
1981 Saloon

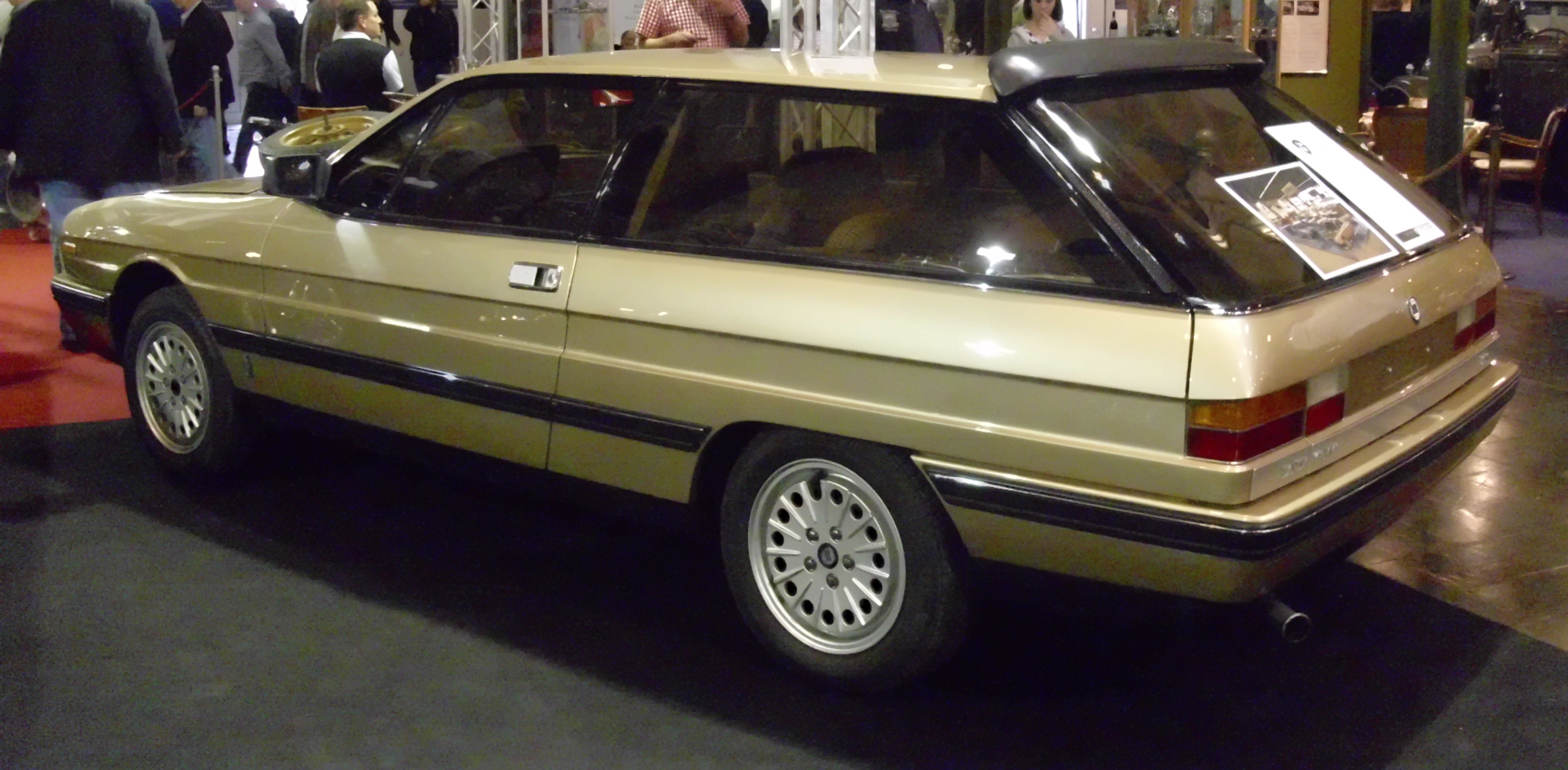
1982 Pininfarina Gamma Olgiata
