= Lancia Superjolly =

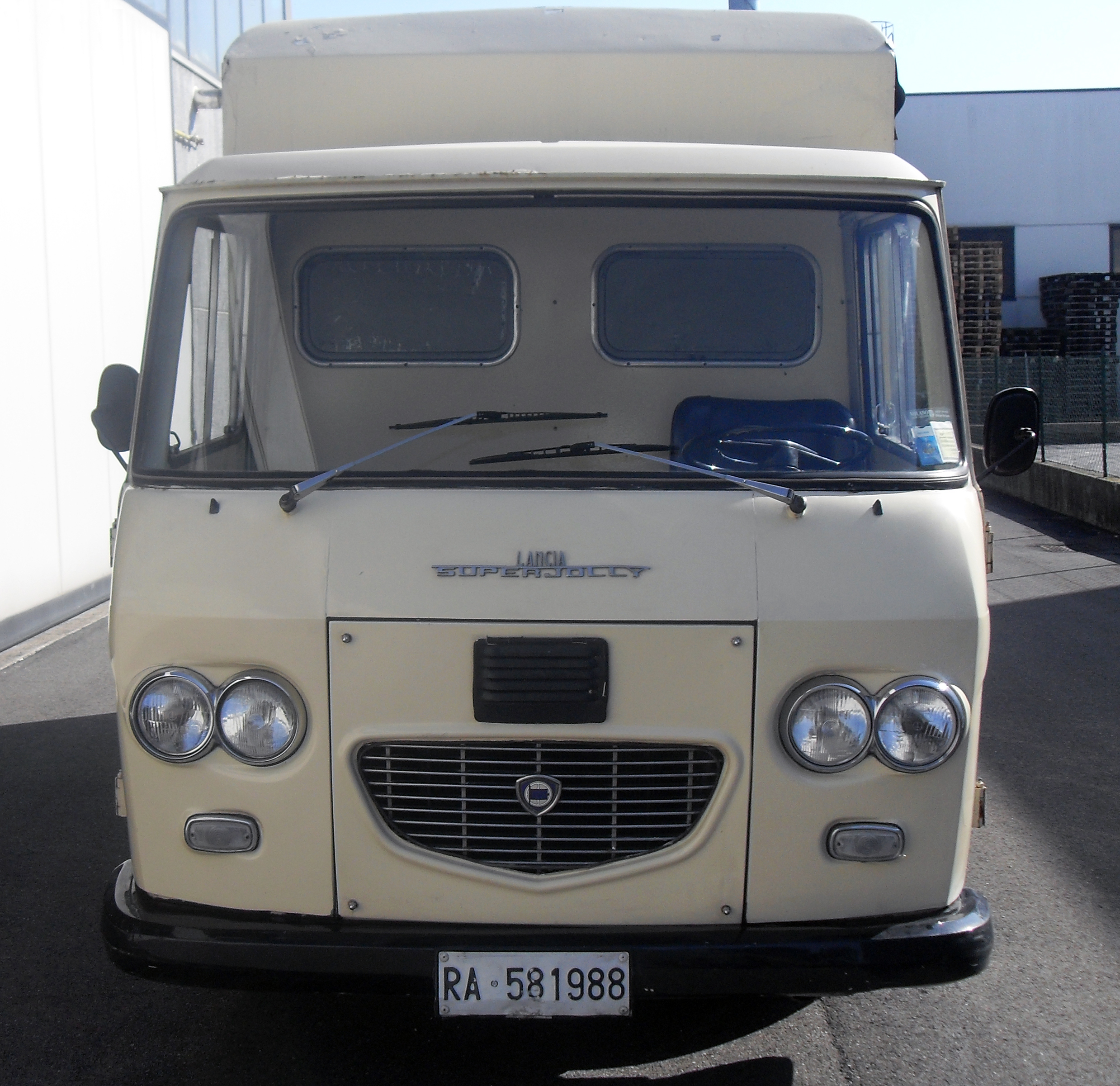

Overview
- Production: 1963–1970

Body and chassis
- Related: Lancia Flavia

Powertrain
- Engine: 1488 cc 315.000 H4 (315.000); 1800 cc 315.300 H4 (315.024)
- Transmission: 4-speed manual

Dimensions
- Wheelbase: 2,550 mm (100.4 in); 3,110 mm (122.4 in); 3,650 mm (144 in)

The Lancia Superjolly is a light commercial vehicle produced by the Italian manufacturer Lancia. The truck, which shares its 815.000 engine and some other mechanicals with the Lancia Flavia, is the successor of the Appia-based Lancia Jolly. It was first revealed at the 1964 Geneva Motor Show.

The 1½ ton Superjolly has a longer wheelbase than its predecessor. The little truck was produced from 1963 to 1970 in Turin, Italy. The first model (315.000) was produced in 1674 examples, while 1272 of the 1.8-litre 315.024 model meant that overall production was 2948. The Superjolly has front-wheel drive with independent suspension, meaning that the loading area is uncommonly low. The subframe and drivetrain of the Flavia were used, with some modifications to handle heavier work, but the Superjolly also utilized parts from the Appia, Fulvia, and Flaminia ranges.Manual transmission was standard (Flavia's fully synchronized four-speed).

The front suspension setup is similar to the Flavia's, independent double wishbone with a single (albeit heavier duty) transverse leaf spring. The track is 1,385 mm (54.5 in) rather than 1300 as on the Flavia, while the leaf sprung live rear axle is 1,500 mm (59.1 in) wide.

== Engines ==
The engine was originally a 1.5-liter flat-four cylinder, and with 58 CV (43 kW) it has considerably more power than does the Jolly's V4 engine. From late 1966, the Superjolly was also available with the larger (1.8) engine from the upgraded Flavias, although the 1488 cc flat-four continued to be available alongside it. This, the second series, was also available on two longer wheelbases. the 1.8 produces 80.5 CV (59 kW) at 4800 rpm. From 1967, the Kugelfischer fuel-injected 1.8 with 102 CV (75 kW) was also available, but very few Superjollys were made with this engine option. The 1.8 was taken out of production in 1969, with only the cheaper 1.5 remaining available through 1970.

== Versions ==
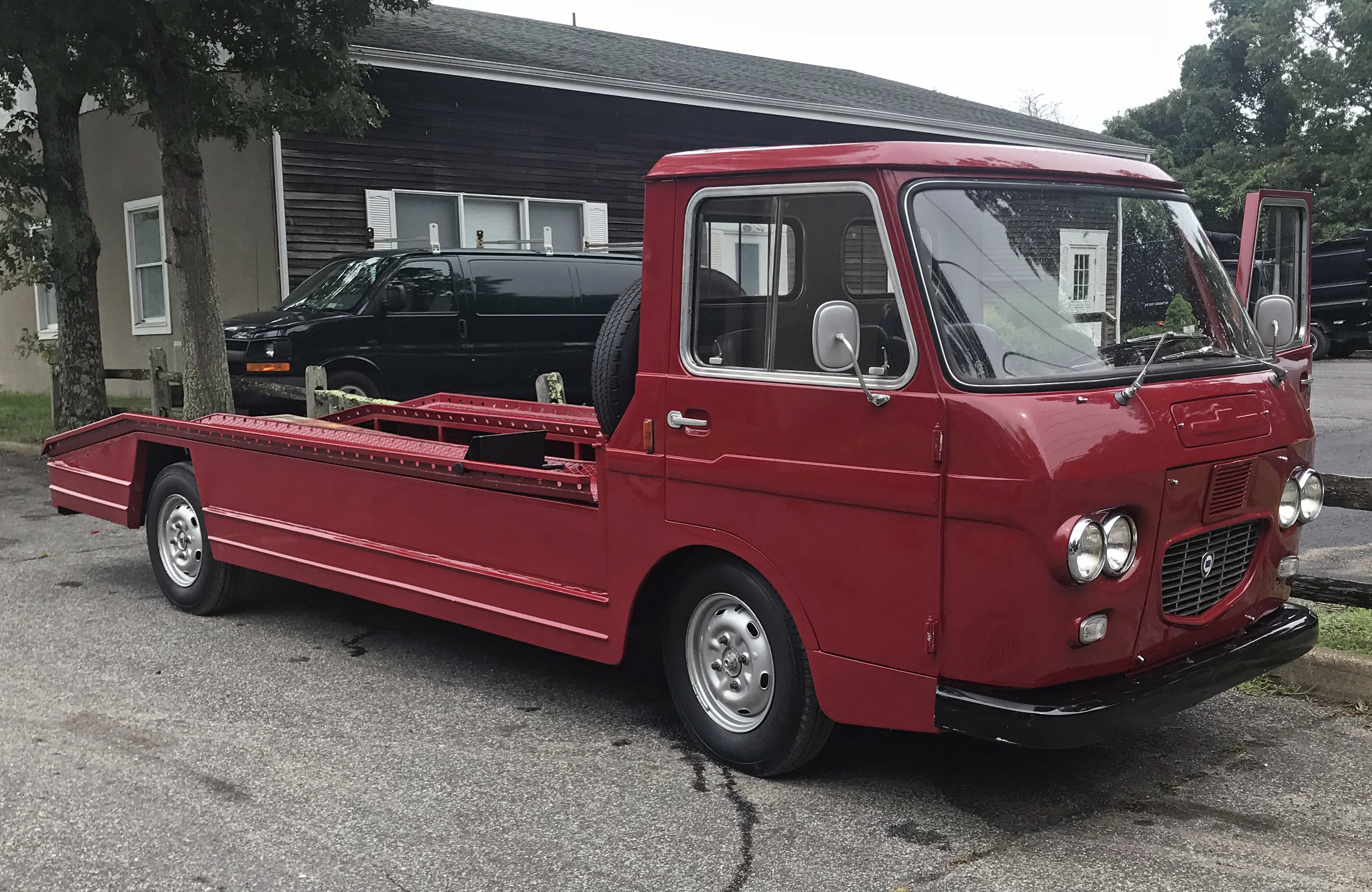
1970 Lancia Superjolly car transporter

The low-loading truck - with a loading floor max height of only 482 mm (19.0 in) - was available with a variety of bodywork, as a van, pick-up, ambulance, and bus. There were also special designs available, such as a motorhome version and a display truck for companies to show their new products. The truck was also used by the Poste Italiane. The 1966 arrival of the much simpler and cheaper Fiat 124-engined, front-wheel-drive Fiat 238 marked the beginning of the end for the Superjolly, although it soldiered on until 1970.
