= Lancia 2000 =

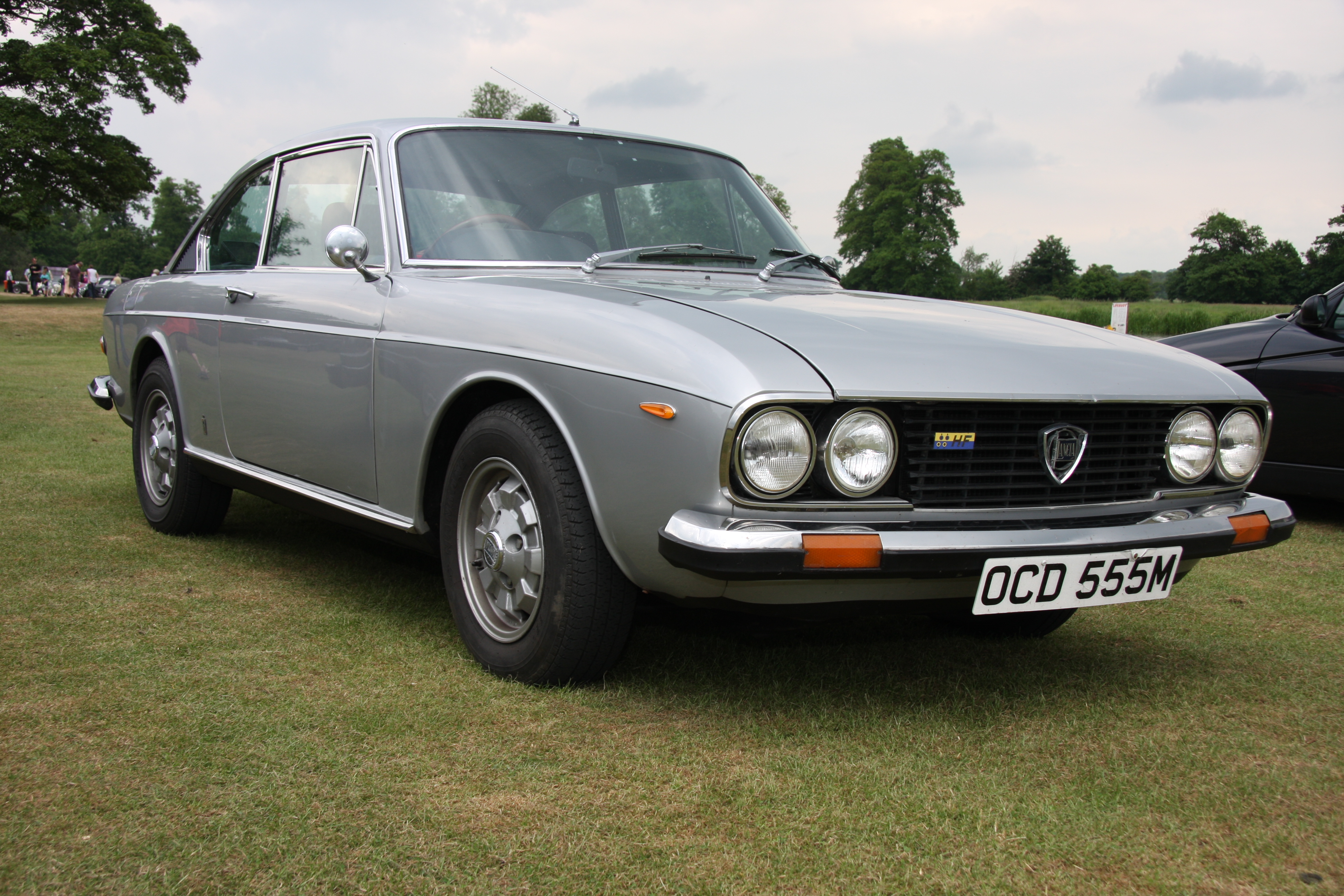
- Lancia 2000 HF Coupe

Overview
- Manufacturer: Lancia
- Production: 1971–1975
- Assembly: Italy: Turin
- Designer: Piero Castagnero (saloon); Pininfarina (coupé)

Body and chassis
- Class: Executive car (E)
- Body style: 4-door saloon; 2-door coupé
- Layout: Longitudinal Front-engine, front-wheel-drive

Powertrain
- Engine: 2.0 L (1,991 cc) Lancia H4
- Transmission: 4-speed ZF manual; 5-speed ZF manual

Dimensions
- Length: saloon: 4,620 mm (181.9 in); coupé: 4,555 mm (179.3 in)
- Width: saloon: 1,610 mm (63.4 in); coupé: 1,605 mm (63.2 in)
- Height: saloon: 1,440 mm (56.7 in); coupé: 1,340 mm (52.8 in)
- Curb weight: saloon: 1,230 kg (2,712 lb); coupé: 1,150 kg (2,535 lb)

Chronology
- Predecessor: Lancia Flavia
- Successor: Lancia Gamma

The Lancia 2000 (Tipo 820) is a series of automobiles produced by Italian automaker Lancia between 1971 and 1975. It was the last vehicle independently designed by Lancia engineers before the marque's acquisition by Fiat in 1969. The 2000 was a direct evolution of the Flavia, which it replaced.

== The 2000 saloon ==
The 2000 saloon kept the central part of the body (roof, doors, interior) and the entire drivetrain (except for some improvements to the fuel injection) of its predecessor, the second series of the Flavia.

The most significant changes were made to the front and rear of the body, where the designers modernised the styling of its predecessor. In particular, the tail was squared and simplified, and the nose lost its separate air intake and headlamp nacelles. The mechanics retained most of the Flavia's specifications including the front-wheel drive, boxer engine, independent suspension, and disc brakes all around, with vacuum assist and split-circuits (called "Super duplex" by Lancia).

The 2000 used the 1991 cc 4-cylinder boxer engine, available in either carburetted form 115 hp (85 kW) or with fuel-injection 125 hp (92 kW). The latter abandoned the previously used Kugelfischer mechanical system in favor of a more reliable Bosch D-type electronic system. Bosch-equipped cars are distinguished by an "i.e." badge on the grille, signifying 'iniezione elettronica' ("electronic injection"). The transmission (produced by ZF) was a 4-speed manual for the 2000 equipped with a carburetor, and a manual 5-speed for the fuel-injected 2000. Since the 2000 was given a flagship role for Lancia (following in the footsteps of the Flaminia), the 2000 was given a high standard of finishes (fine wood for the dashboard and velvet or leather upholstery) and standard or optional equipment including hydraulically operated power steering (also manufactured by ZF), air conditioning, electric windows and sun blinds.

Because of the 2000s high production costs, Fiat was not in favor of putting the model into production, despite it being ready for production in 1969, which delayed its launch. But in the absence of any other new Lancia flagship models being ready, the 2000 was nonetheless launched in 1971. The 2000 was considered by many fans of the marque to be "the last real Lancia" due to the high build quality that the later models (Beta and Gamma) lacked. It was produced until 1974 with a total of 14,319 examples being made.

== The 2000 and 2000 HF Coupé ==
The Lancia 2000 and 2000 HF Coupé were an evolution of the Series II Flavia Coupé. The car's bodyshell was designed and made by Pininfarina. The interior was also designed by Pininfarina and bears a striking resemblance to that of the Ferrari 330 GT. The cosmetic changes to the 2000 Coupé were largely confined to a new grille (matte black instead of chrome) with headlamps incorporated into the now wider intake, new bumpers (with rubber strips on the HF), and the tail was shorn of its vestigial tailfins, with a raised and squared decklid.

The interior did not undergo significant changes, being merely a refinement of the previous design. The powerplant was adopted from the 2000 sedan and available in two states of tune: carburetted on the 2000 Coupé or with Bosch electronic fuel injection and engine management on the 2000 HF. The HF was recognizable by the body-side rub-strip, a wooden Nardi steering wheel, and magnesium alloy wheels by Cromodora. Both versions had a 5-speed manual transmission with a dog-leg arrangement.

The Lancia 2000 and 2000 HF Coupés were technologically advanced for the day with features such as a 5-speed transmission, power assisted steering and electronic fuel injection on the 2000 HF. They are very well appointed with polished stainless steel trim work, as opposed to chromed mild steel.

The cars do not suffer the corrosion problems associated with later generation Lancia automobiles and are generally regarded as being more resistant than contemporaries from other Italian manufacturers.

== Engine ==
The Bosch electronics that were developed specifically for the 2000s boxer engine raised its maximum power to 125 hp (92 kW), the same as contemporary BMW and Alfa Romeo cars. This improvement, however, was never publicized by Lancia because the marketing department believed that their targeted customers would less favorably respond to a campaign that emphasized power and performance rather than quality, technical sophistication and riding comfort.

=== Engine specifications ===
Model	Years	Engine	Fuel system	Power	Torque
2000	1969–1974	1991 cc Lancia OHV H4	twin-choke carburettor	115 PS DIN (85 kW; 113 hp) at 5,500 rpm	167 N⋅m (123 lb⋅ft) at 3,500 rpm
2000 Iniezione	1969–1974	1991 cc Lancia OHV H4	Bosch fuel injection	125 PS DIN (92 kW; 123 hp) at 5,800 rpm	172 N⋅m (127 lb⋅ft) at 3,700 rpm

== Gallery ==
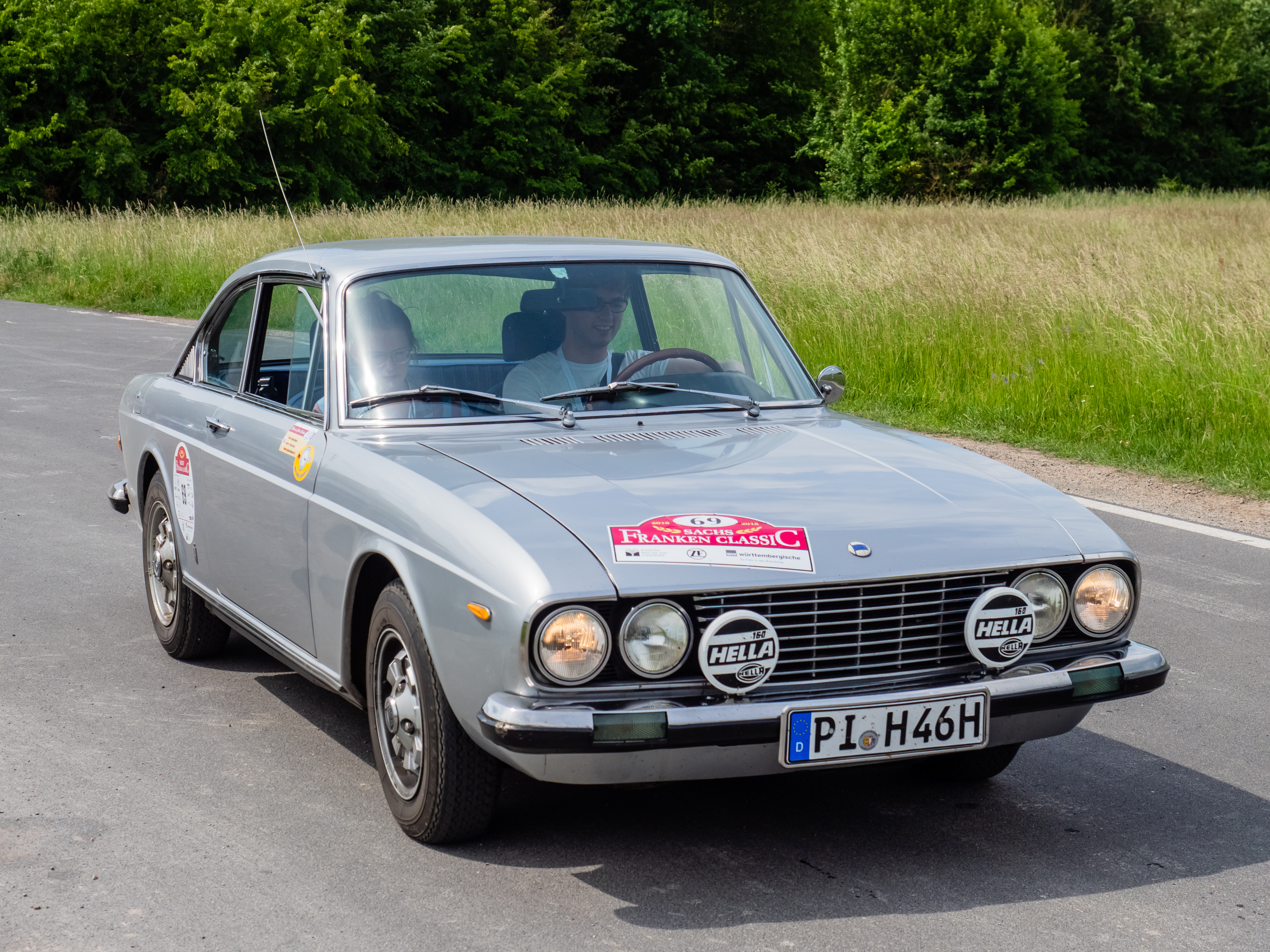
Lancia 2000 HF Coupé

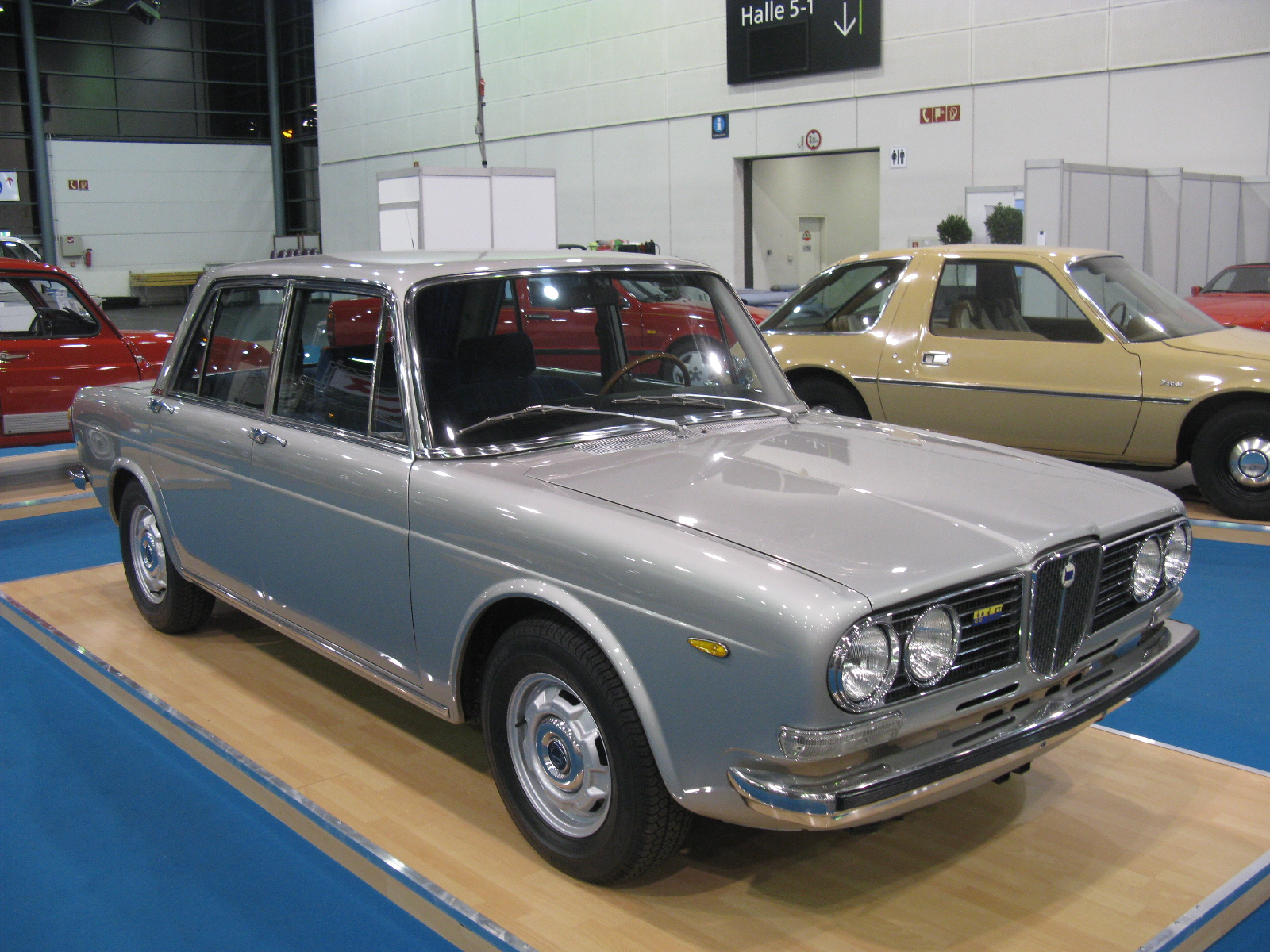
Lancia 2000 Berlina

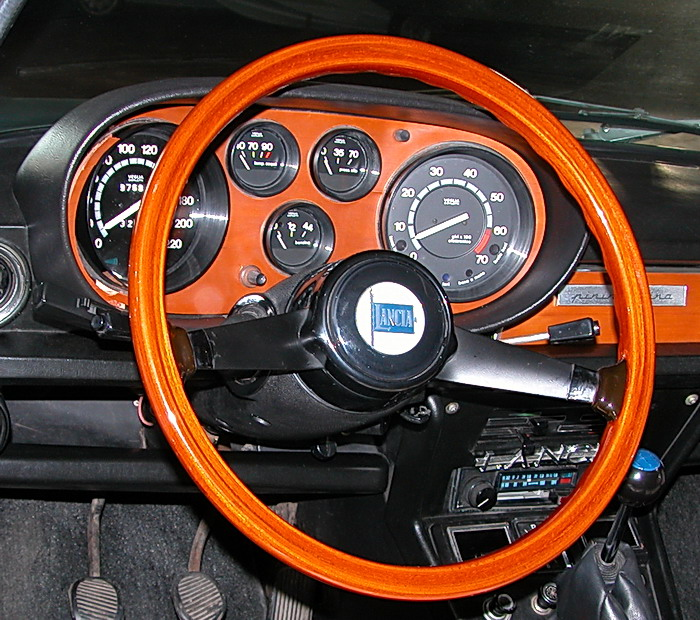
Lancia 2000 HF Coupé gauges

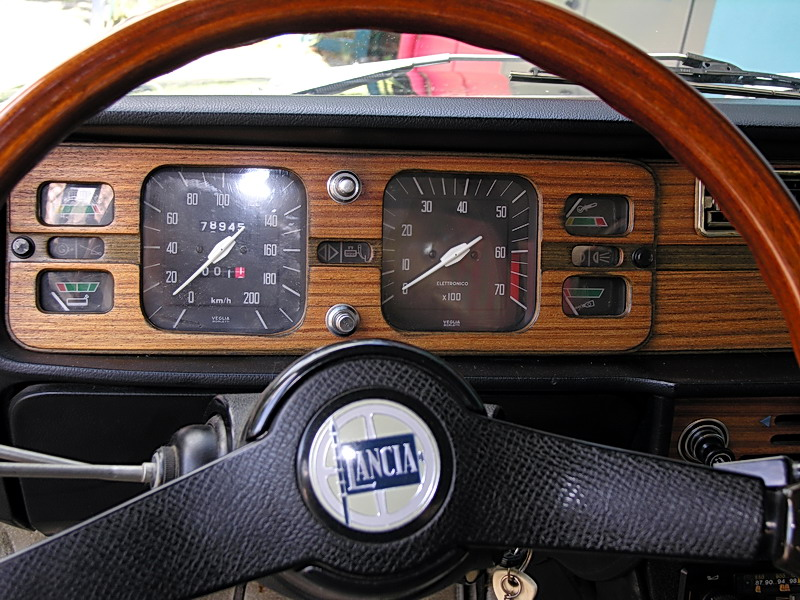
1972 Lancia 2000 i.e. gauges

== Production ==
Version	Years	Production	Internal code
2000	1971–1975	8,844	820.210
2000 i.e.	1972–1975	5,475	820.416
2000 Coupé	1971–1975	1,399	820.230
2000 HF Coupé	1971–1975	1,229	820.436
