= Lancia Flat-4 engine =

Flat-4 engine
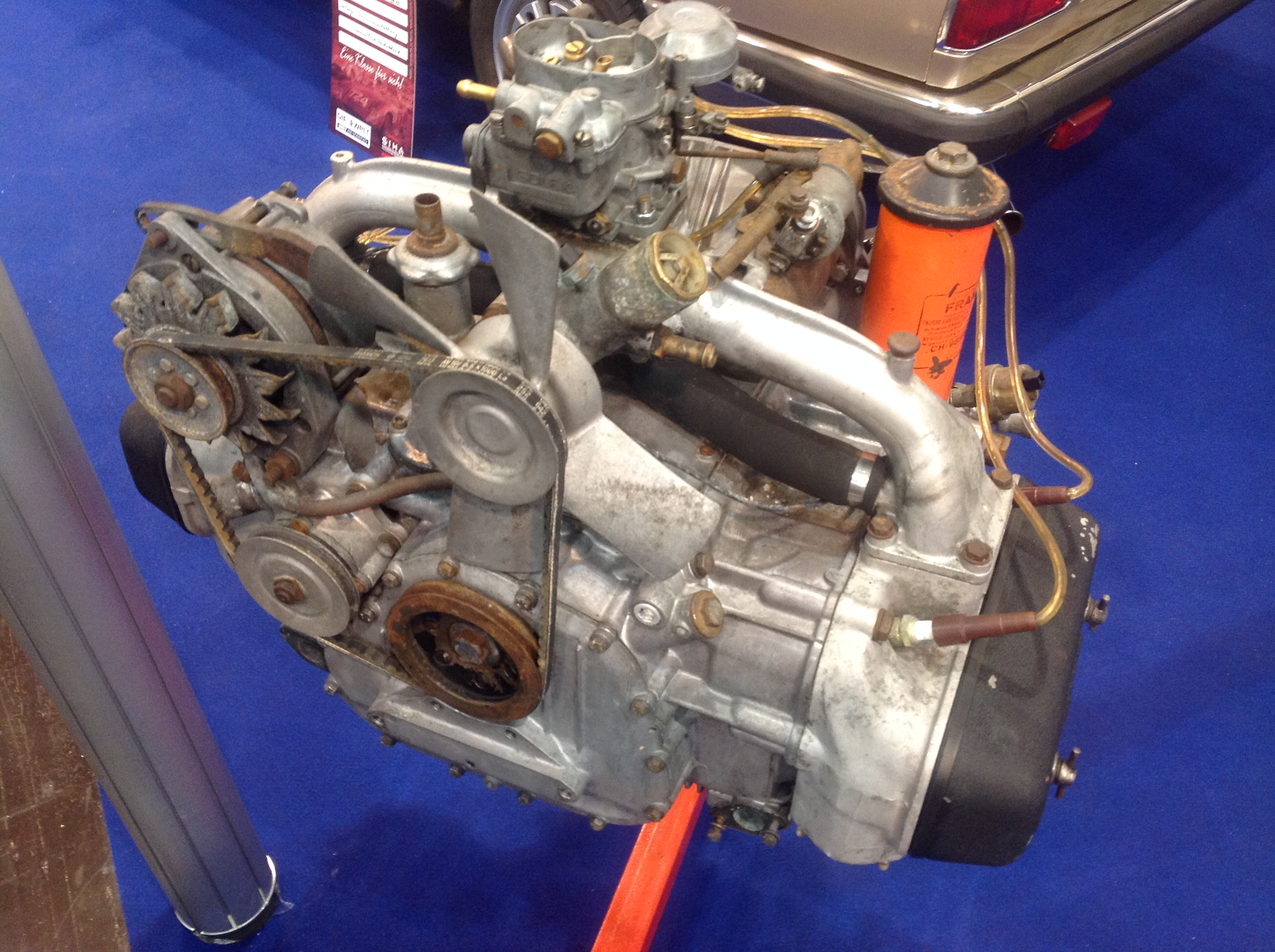
- Boxer engine installed in a Lancia Flavia

Overview
- Production: 1960-1984

Layout
- Configuration: Naturally aspirated Flat-4
- Displacement: 1.5 L (1,488 cc; 90.8 cu in); 1.5 L (1,490 cc; 90.9 cu in); 1.5 L (1,500 cc; 91.5 cu in); 1.7 L (1,727 cc; 105.4 cu in); 1.8 L (1,800 cc; 109.8 cu in); 1.8 L (1,816 cc; 110.8 cu in); 2.0 L (1,991 cc; 121.5 cu in); 2.0 L (1,999 cc; 122.0 cu in); 2.5 L (2,484 cc; 151.6 cu in)
- Cylinder bore: 77 mm (3.03 in); 80 mm (3.15 in); 82 mm (3.23 in); 88 mm (3.46 in); 89 mm (3.5 in)
- Piston stroke: 71 mm (2.8 in); 74 mm (2.91 in); 80 mm (3.15 in); 85 mm (3.35 in)
- Cylinder block material: Light alloy
- Cylinder head material: Aluminum
- Valvetrain: Pushrod or Overhead camshaft

Combustion
- Fuel system: Twin-choke Weber carburetor; Fuel injection
- Fuel type: Petrol
- Cooling system: Water-cooled

Output
- Power output: 92–140 bhp (69–104 kW; 93–142 PS)
- Torque output: 172–208 N⋅m (127–153 lb⋅ft)

Chronology
- Predecessor: Lancia V4 engine

The Lancia Flat-4 engine is an aluminum, pushrod, and later overhead camshaft, flat-four (boxer) engine made by Lancia, initially for the Flavia, from 1960 through 1984. Though it was designed as a pushrod engine, it was advanced for the time. The pushrod version of the Lancia boxer was only ever used in the Flavia, and its derivatives including the Lancia 2000. In 1976, a new overhead cam engine based on a similar layout was designed and brought into production in 2 and 2.5-litre displacements for the Gamma.

== Pushrod ==
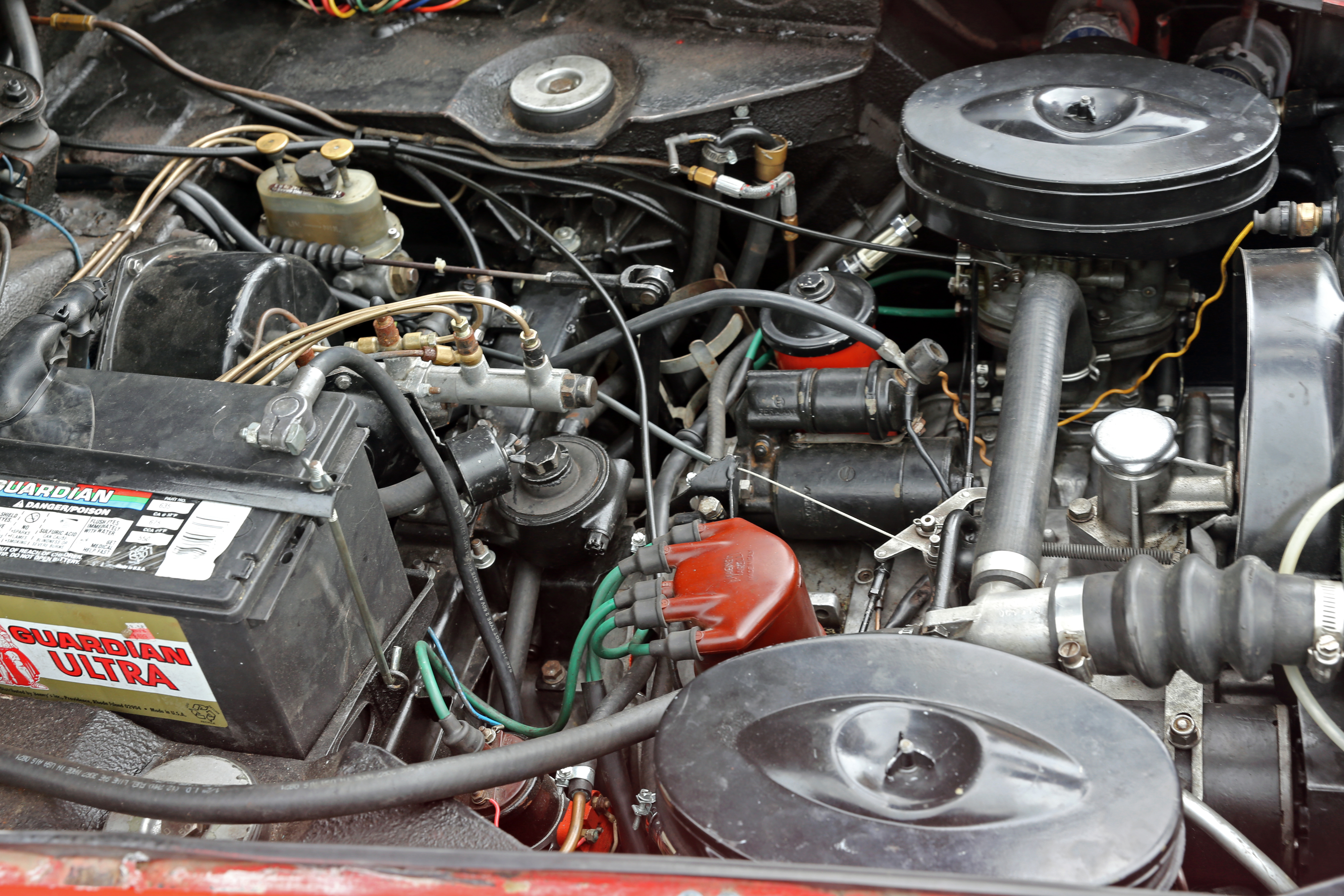
Engine in a Lancia Flavia convertibile (by Vignale) at the 2014 Lime Rock Gathering of the Marques attached to the Concours d'Elegance

=== 1500 ===
The original version was the 1.5 L (1,500 cc; 91.5 cu in) introduced in 1960; it used an 82 mm × 71 mm (3.23 in × 2.80 in) bore and stroke. It was revised on 1963 with a smaller 80 mm (3.15 in) bore and a longer 74 mm (2.91 in) stroke, thus displacing 1.5 L (1,488 cc; 90.8 cu in). A final version was introduced in 1967 with an even longer 80 mm (3.15 in) stroke coupled with a 77 mm (3.03 in) bore, giving a displacement of 1.5 L (1,490 cc; 90.9 cu in). Production ceased in 1970.

=== 1800 ===
The first 1800 was a 1.7 L (1,727 cc; 105.4 cu in) introduced in 1962. It used an 88 mm × 71 mm (3.46 in × 2.80 in) bore and stroke. One year later it was replaced by a true 1.8 L (1,800 cc; 109.8 cu in) engine thanks to a longer 74 mm (2.91 in) stroke. In 1967 appeared the 1.8 L (1,816 cc; 110.8 cu in) version using an 85 mm × 80 mm (3.35 in × 3.15 in) bore and stroke.

=== 2000 ===
The 2.0 L (1,991 cc; 121.5 cu in) 2000 version was the ultimate Flavia engine. Bore and stroke was 89 mm × 80 mm (3.50 in × 3.15 in) for a good oversquare ratio. In 1971, the 2.0 L produced 115 bhp (86 kW; 117 PS), and in the HF Coupé in 1972 it produced 125 bhp (93 kW; 127 PS). This engine was produced from 1968 through 1974.

== OHC ==
Lancia developed the large light-alloy overhead camshaft 2.0-litre and 2.5-litre flat-4 engines specifically for the Lancia Gamma, rather than using Fiat derived engines as used in the Beta and Montecarlo and were in production between 1976 and 1984.

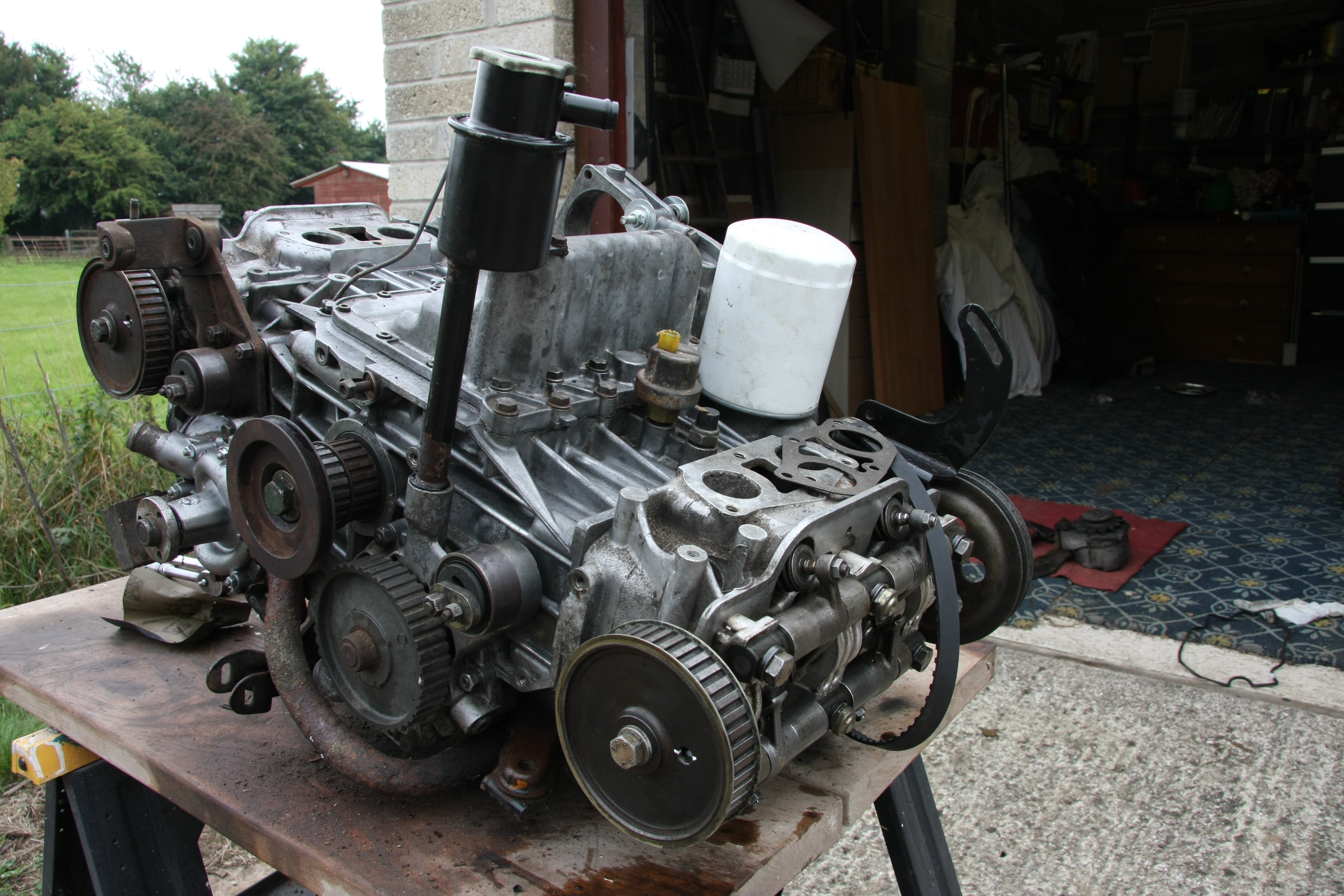
A Lancia Gamma flat-four engine.

=== 2000 ===
Replacing the 2.0 L pushrod engine used in the Flavia, the new 2.0 L (1,999 cc; 122.0 cu in) OHC engine produced 120 bhp (89 kW; 122 PS) at 5500 rpm and 172 N⋅m (127 lb⋅ft) of torque at 3500 rpm.

=== 2500 ===
The 2.5 L (2,484 cc; 151.6 cu in) engine was initially available with twin-choke Weber carburetors, but in the last few years of production it was equipped with fuel injection. In both forms, it produced 140 bhp (104 kW; 142 PS) at 5400 rpm and 208 N⋅m (153 lb⋅ft) torque at 3000 rpm.
