= Lancia Flavia =

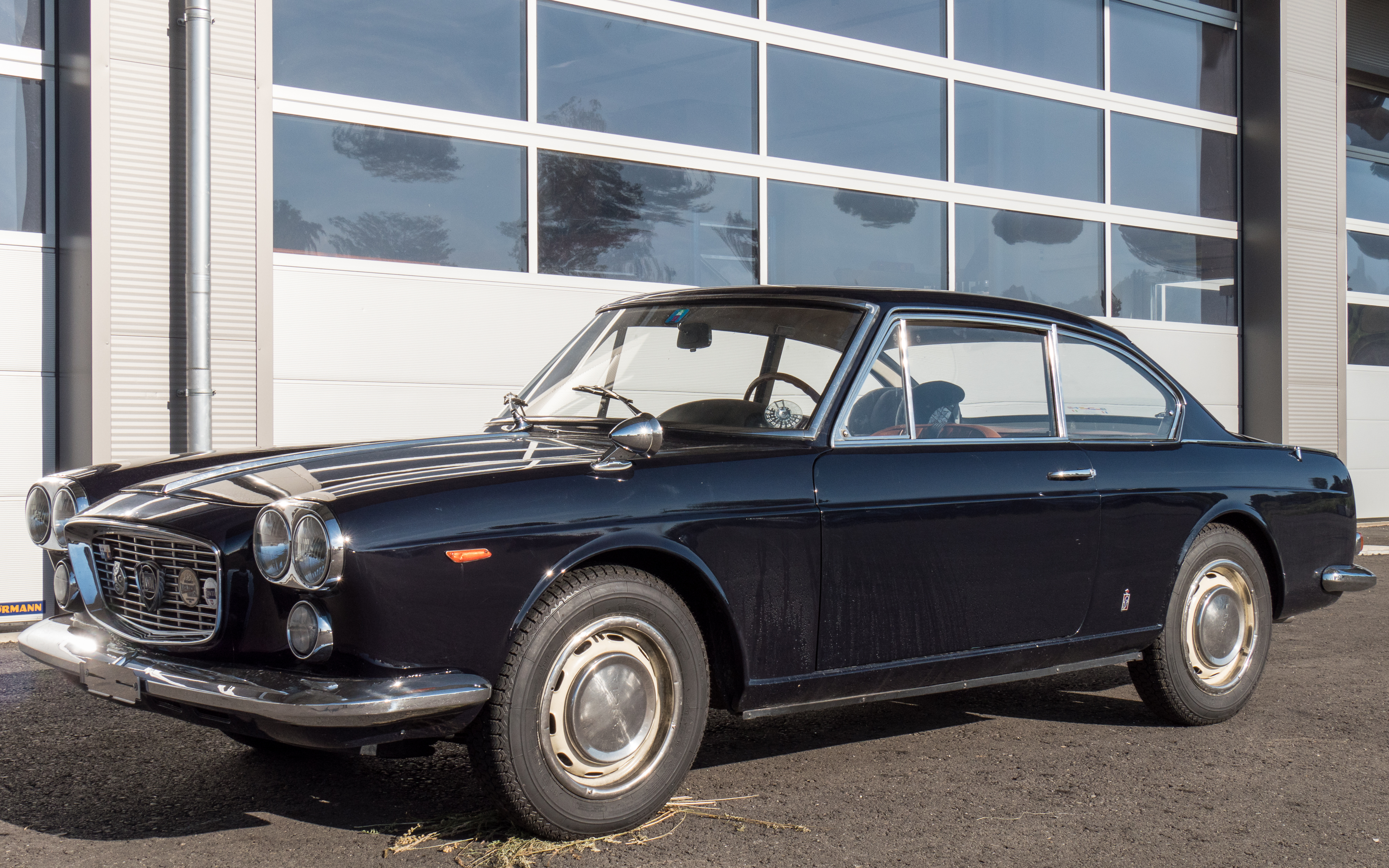
- Lancia Flavia 1.8 Iniezone Coupé

Overview
- Manufacturer: Lancia
- Production: 1961–1971; 105,848 produced
- Assembly: Italy: Turin
- Designer: Piero Castegnero (Berlina); Pininfarina (Coupé); Giovanni Michelotti at Vignale (Convertible); Ercole Spada at Zagato (Sport)

Body and chassis
- Class: Executive car (E)
- Body style: 4-door sedan; 2-door coupé; 2-door cabriolet
- Layout: Longitudinal Front-engine, front-wheel-drive

Powertrain
- Engine: 1.5 L (1,488 cc) Lancia H4; 1.5 L (1,490 cc) Lancia H4; 1.5 L (1,500 cc) Lancia H4; 1.8 L (1,800 cc) Lancia H4; 2.0 L (1,991 cc) Lancia H4
- Transmission: 4-speed manual; 5-speed manual

Dimensions
- Wheelbase: 104 in (2,600 mm)
- Length: 180 in (4,600 mm)
- Width: 63.5 in (1,610 mm)
- Height: 58 in (1,500 mm)

Chronology
- Successor: Lancia 2000

The Lancia Flavia (Tipo 815/819/820) is an executive car produced by Italian automaker Lancia from 1961 to 1971.

The Flavia was launched with a 1,500 cc engine at the 1960 Turin Motor Show and introduced in major European markets during the next twelve months. Coupé and convertible versions designed by Pininfarina and Vignale quickly followed, together with one or two low volume "specials" including a Zagato coupé. Performance improved over the next ten years as the engine displacement was progressively increased to 1,991 cc. The car remained in production until 1970 when it was updated and renamed as the Lancia 2000. The Flavia was named after the Via Flavia, a Roman road leading from Trieste (Tergeste) to Dalmatia.

In 2011, Fiat announced that the Chrysler 200 convertible would be sold in Europe (LHD markets only) by Lancia under the Flavia name from early 2012.

== Chronology ==
The Lancia Flavia was developed by Antonio Fessia in the late 1950s at the directive of the then Lancia owner Carlo Pesenti as a new model to bridge the gap between the Appia and Flaminia. The car was introduced at the 1960 Turin Motor Show. Initially available only as a four-door saloon, it featured a 1.5 L aluminium boxer engine, Dunlop disc brakes on all four wheels, front-wheel drive, and front suspension by unequal-length wishbones. The boxer engine was the first for an Italian production car as well as disc brakes on all four wheels The front-wheel drive layout was chosen by Fessia to have 62% of the car's weight at the front in order to improve traction. This model was soon joined by a two-door coupé, designed by Pininfarina on a shortened platform. Vignale built 1,601 two-door convertibles, while Zagato designed an outlandish-looking lightweight two-door "sport" version. Only 626 of the Zagato-bodied models were built, plus three prototypes. Ninety-eight had the 1500 engine and the remaining 512 received the larger 1800 engine.

The sport version has twin carburetors for extra power (just over 100 CV [99 hp; 74 kW]); however, this version of the engine was notoriously difficult to keep in tune. Even the single-carburettor engine suffered from the problem of timing chain stretch. Sprockets with Vernier adjusters were fitted to allow for chain wear, and the cam timing was supposed to be checked every 6,000 miles (9,700 km). Early cars also suffered from corrosion of the cylinder heads caused by using copper gaskets on aluminium heads; nevertheless, the car had good performance for its day, considering the cubic capacity.

Later development of the engine included an enlargement to 1.8 L, a version with mechanical injection using the Kugelfischer system, and a five-speed manual gearbox. In May 1967 a rebodied version of the Berlina with a new interior went on sale, with model number 819, it is usually referred to as the Series II. The engines were originally the same as earlier (74 mm stroke in 1500, 1800, 1800 fuel injected), but in 1969 these were changed to a new generation with an 80 mm stroke, narrow-bore versions of the new 2-litre 820-series engine. With the introduction of the 819, the Vignale and Zagato versions were discontinued, while the coupé model was on hiatus. The coupé version then returned with new bodywork, first presented in March 1969 at the Geneva Motor Show. The engine increased to 2.0 L in capacity, available with carburetion or fuel injection, and four- or five-speed gearbox. The 2.0 L models were only made with bodies featuring the revised design. Then in 1971, after Fiat took control of the company, the "Flavia" badge was discontinued as were the smaller engines, leaving only the 2000 Berlina and coupé.

== Engines ==
Model	Years	Engine	Displacement	Power	Fuel system
Berlina	1960-1962	Lancia H4 ohv	1,500 cc	78 PS (57 kW; 77 hp)	Single carburetor
Coupé, cab, sport	1962	Lancia H4 ohv	1,500 cc	90 PS (66 kW; 89 hp)	Double carburetor
1500	1963-1968	Lancia H4 ohv	1,488 cc	80 PS (59 kW; 79 hp)	Single carburetor
1800	1963-1968	Lancia H4 ohv	1,800 cc	92 PS (68 kW; 91 hp)	Single carburetor
1800 sport	1963-1967	Lancia H4 ohv	1,800 cc	105 PS (77 kW; 104 hp)	Double carburetor
1800 Iniezione	1965-1968	Lancia H4 ohv	1,800 cc	102 PS (75 kW; 101 hp)	Fuel injection
1500	1969-70	Lancia H4 ohv	1,490 cc	80 PS (59 kW; 79 hp)	Single carburetor
1800	1969-70	Lancia H4 ohv	1,815 cc	92 PS (68 kW; 91 hp)	Single carburetor
2000	1969-1971	Lancia H4 ohv	1,991 cc	114 PS (84 kW; 112 hp)	Single carburetor
2000 Iniezione	1969-1971	Lancia H4 ohv	1,991 cc	126 PS (93 kW; 124 hp)	Fuel injection

Valid engine bore/stroke combinations

Stroke (mm)	Bore (mm)						
Stroke (mm)	77	80	82	85	88	89	
71	1322	1428	1500	1612	1723^{a}	1767	Capacity (cc)
74	1378	1488^{b}	1563	1680	1800	1841	Capacity (cc)
80	1490^{c}	1608	1690	1815	1946	1991	Capacity (cc)

^{a} The 1723 cc engine was basically a 1500 cc engine with a semi-official, aftermarket Nardi tuning kit, because the original engine did not yield enough power. The crankshaft did not allow a larger capacity than 1723 cc.
^{b} The 1488 cc engine replaced the 1500 cc engine in order to increase the number of parts shared with the new 1800 cc engine.
^{c} Also the 1488 cc engine was replaced, now by the 1490 cc version, to have as many common parts as possible with the 1991 cc power source.

== Performance ==
The British Motor magazine tested the 1500 model in 1961 and found it had a top speed of 92.6 mph (149.0 km/h) and acceleration from 0-60 mph (97 km/h) in 18.6 seconds. A "touring" fuel consumption of 30.0 miles per imperial gallon (9.4 L/100 km; 25.0 mpg_{‑US}) was recorded. On the British market it cost £1,499 including taxes of 688.

By 1967 the engine size had grown to 1,800 cc. Testing a four-door Flavia, Autocar magazine recorded a top speed of 103 mph (166 km/h), a 0-60 mph (97 km/h) time of 15.0 seconds and an overall fuel consumption of 30.0 miles per imperial gallon (9.4 L/100 km; 25.0 mpg_{‑US}). This put it behind the rival BMW 1800 TI for performance, though slightly ahead on fuel consumption. The testers commended the smoothness of the engine but found it lacked low speed punch. Overall they thought the performance "pleasingly deceptive" because the car was "faster than it feels". The UK car market was still insulated by tariffs, but with the BMW 1800 TI retailing at £1,498 and the Flavia's recommended retail price now £1,909, sales volumes were clearly not a Lancia priority. From the dominant UK domestic market player, the mechanically less sophisticated Ford Corsair 2000E was retailing at £1,008.

US Car and Driver magazine tested the 1800 Coupe model equipped with a 4-speed manual transmission in April 1964, comparing it against the Flaminia 3C GT and found that the engine got a "little fussy" at above 5,000 rpm and that "one tries to change up into a fifth gear which is not there". The reviewers however, praised the comfortable cruising speeds, the refined transmission than the base 1500 model along with the handling and the refined front-wheel drive system mentioning that "a lot of people could drive the Flavia a long way without realizing it has front wheel drive". The magazine measured a top speed of 105 mph (169 km/h), a 0-60 mph (97 km/h) time of 14.2 seconds and a fuel consumption of 22–30.0 miles per US gallon (10.7–7.8 L/100 km; 26.4–36.0 mpg_{‑imp}).

== Gallery ==
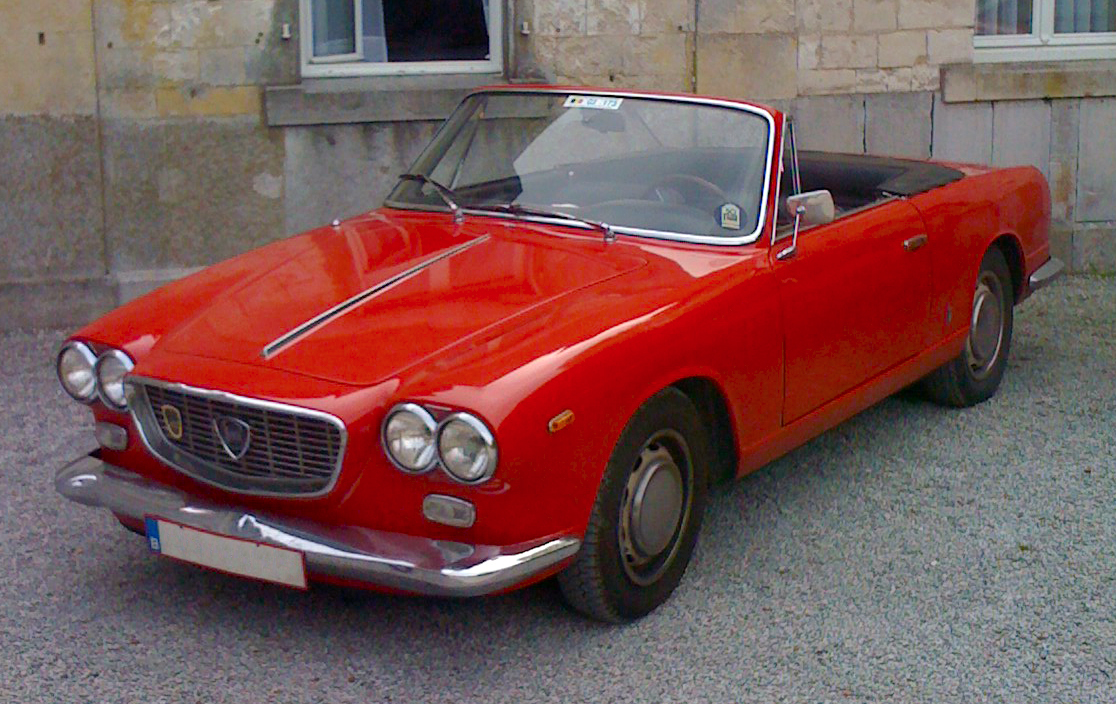
Lancia Flavia convertible

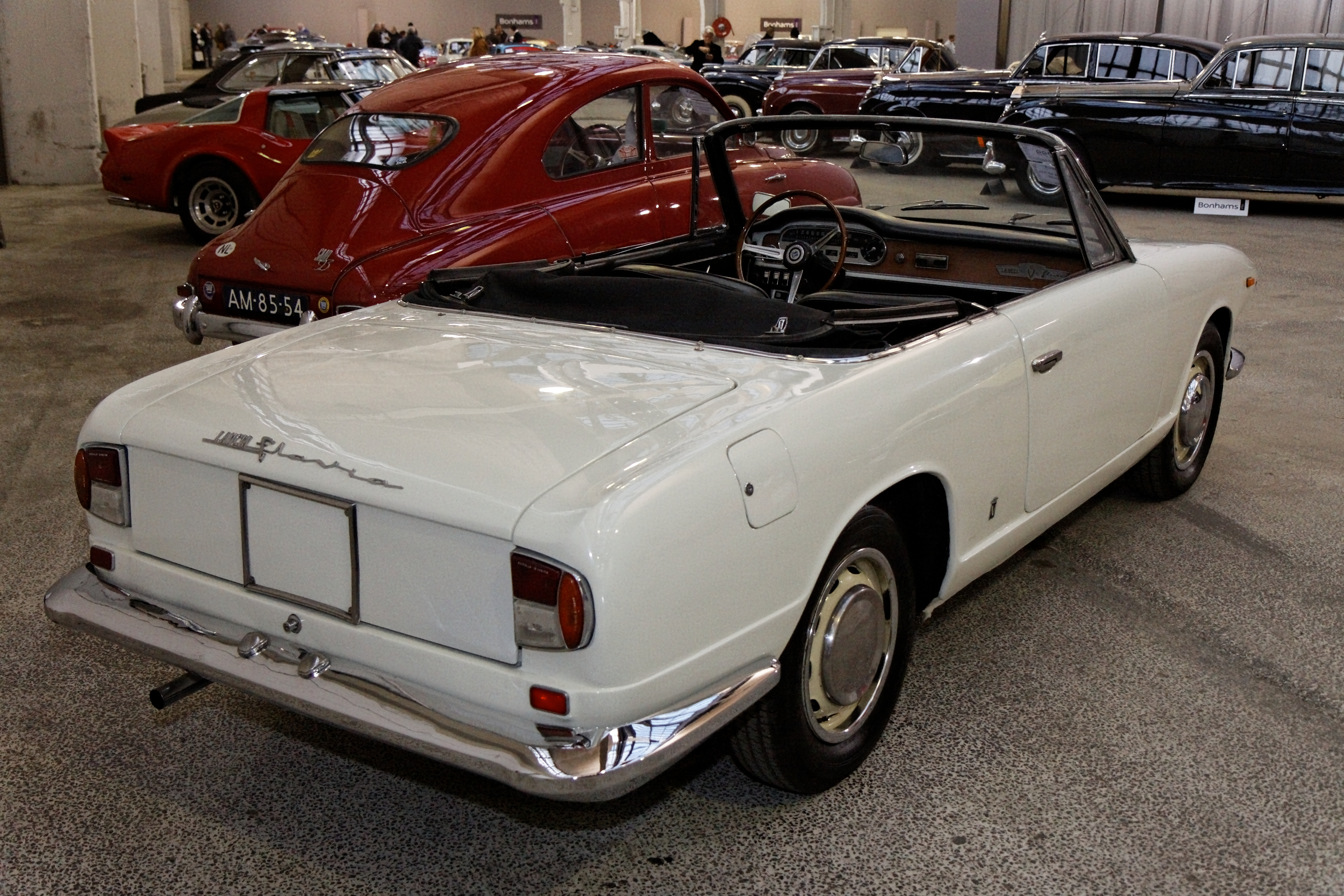
Convertible rear view

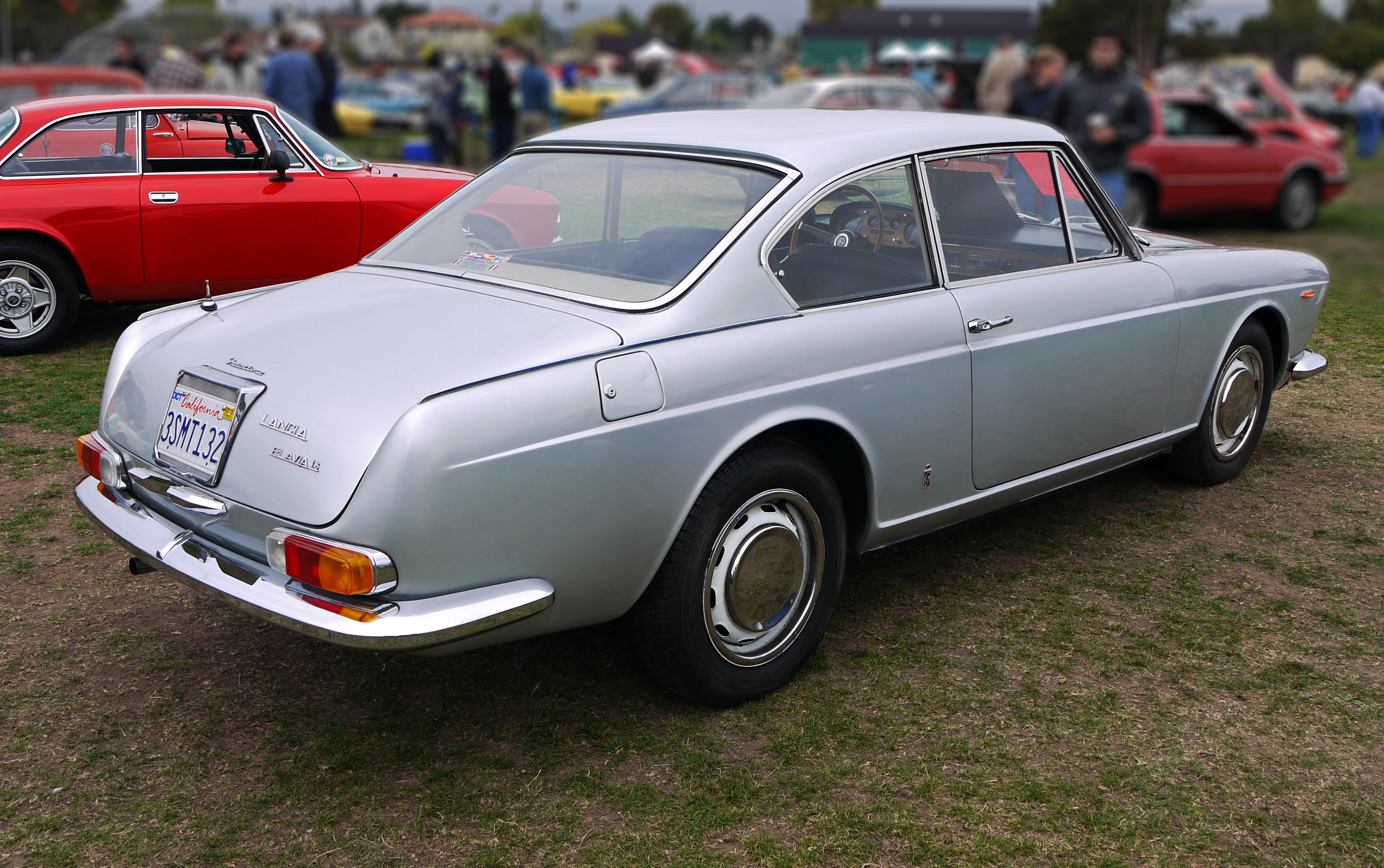
Rear view of Flavia 1800 coupé

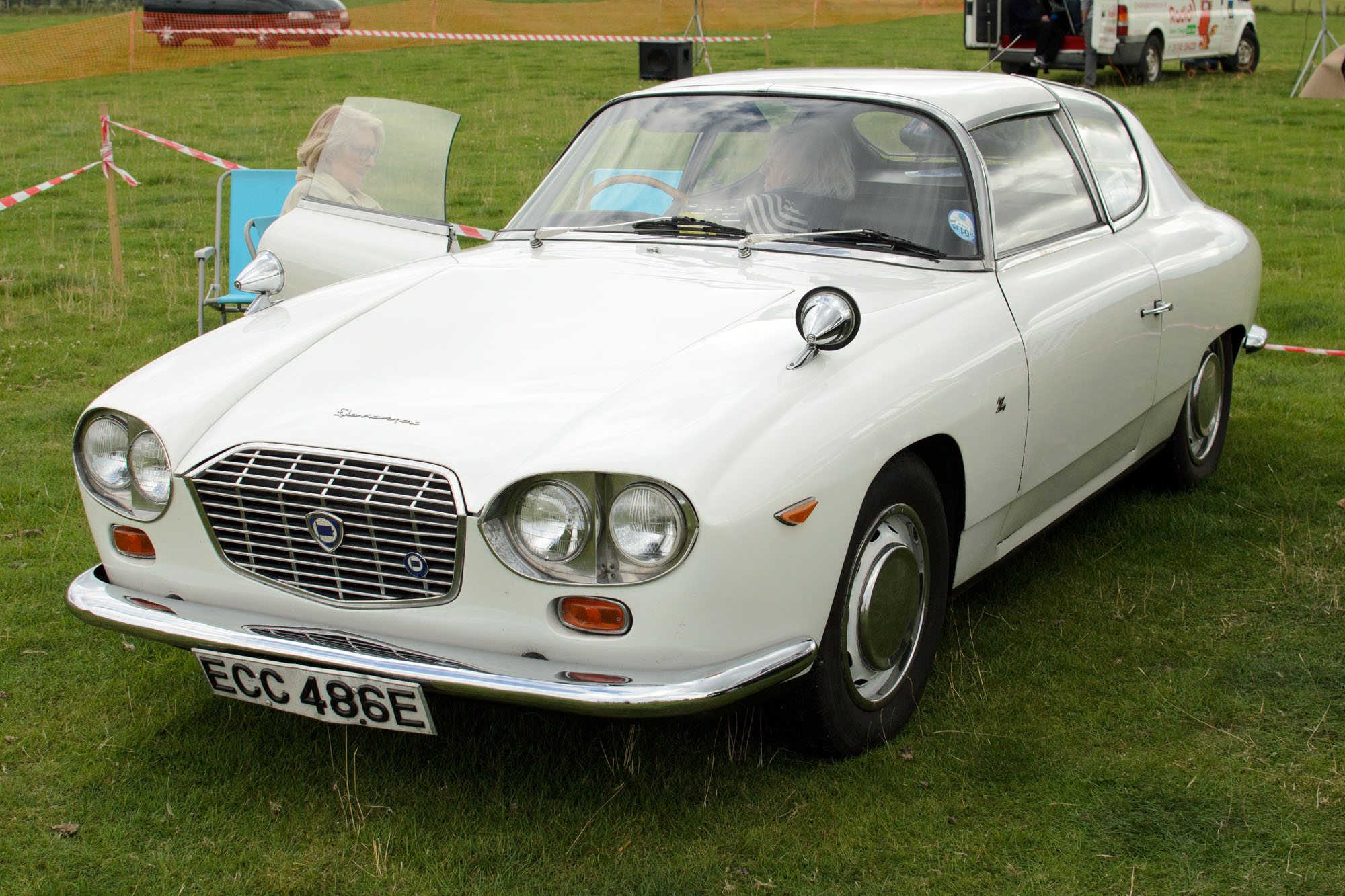
Flavia sport (Zagato)

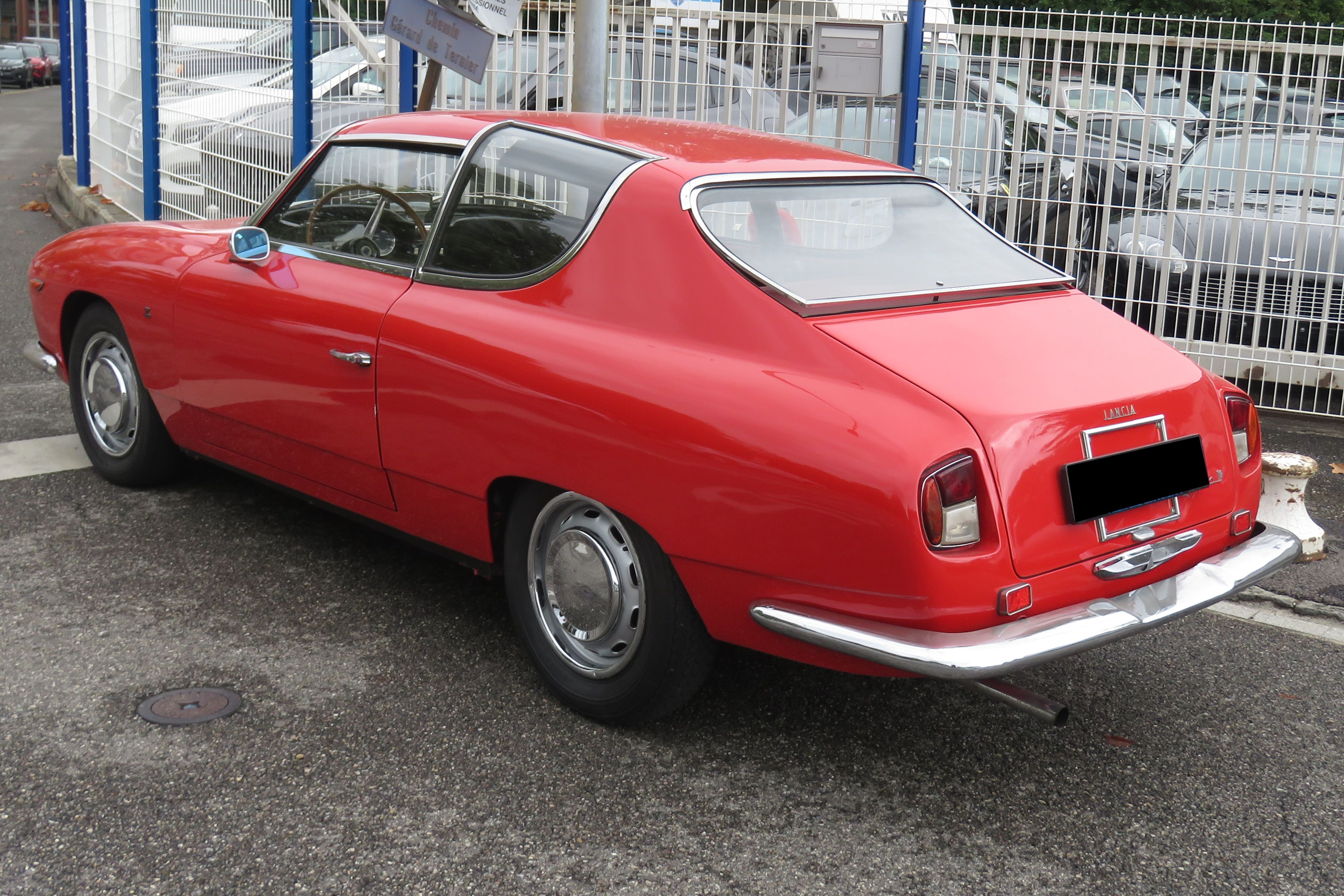
Flavia sport (Zagato, rear)

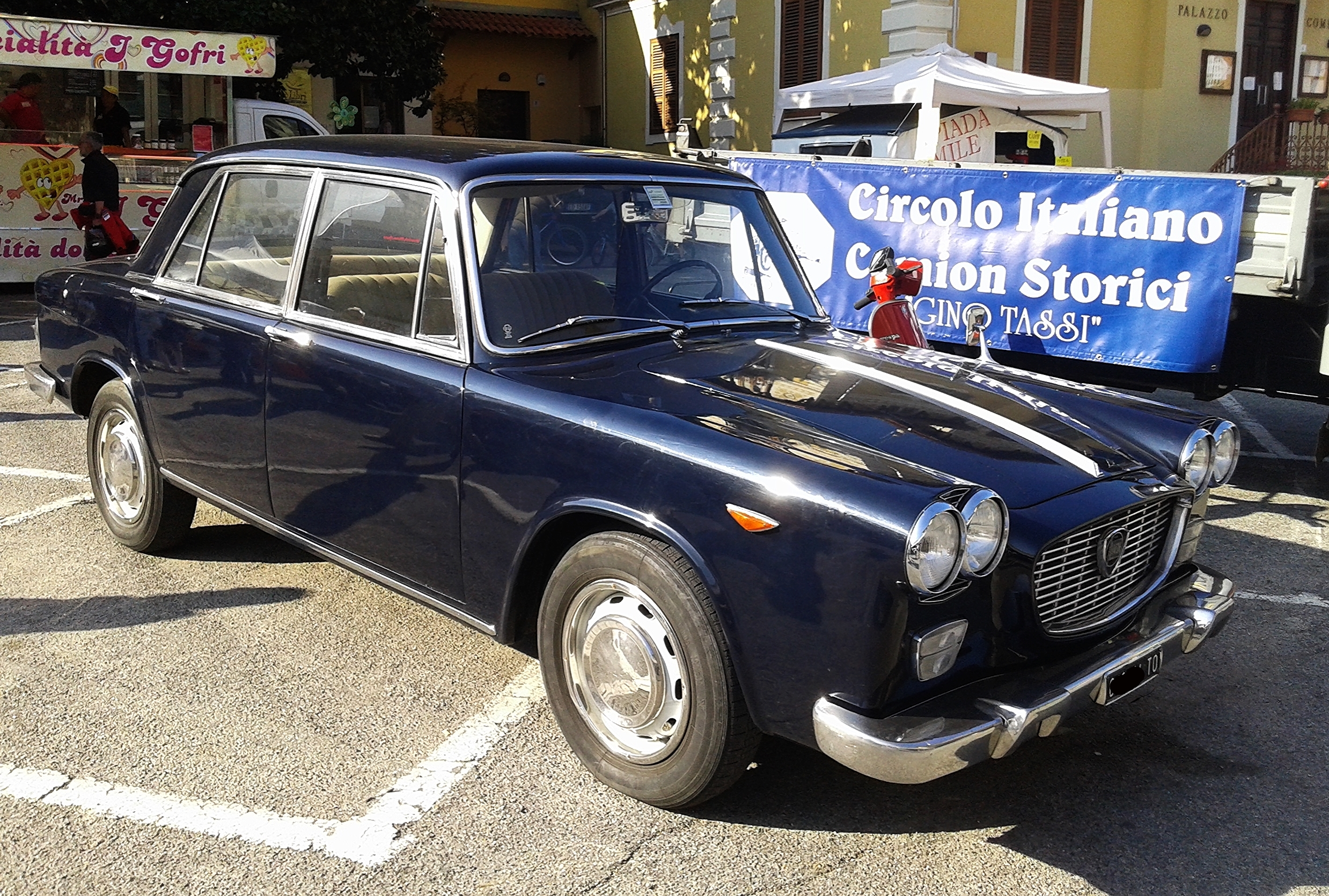
Series I Flavia saloon

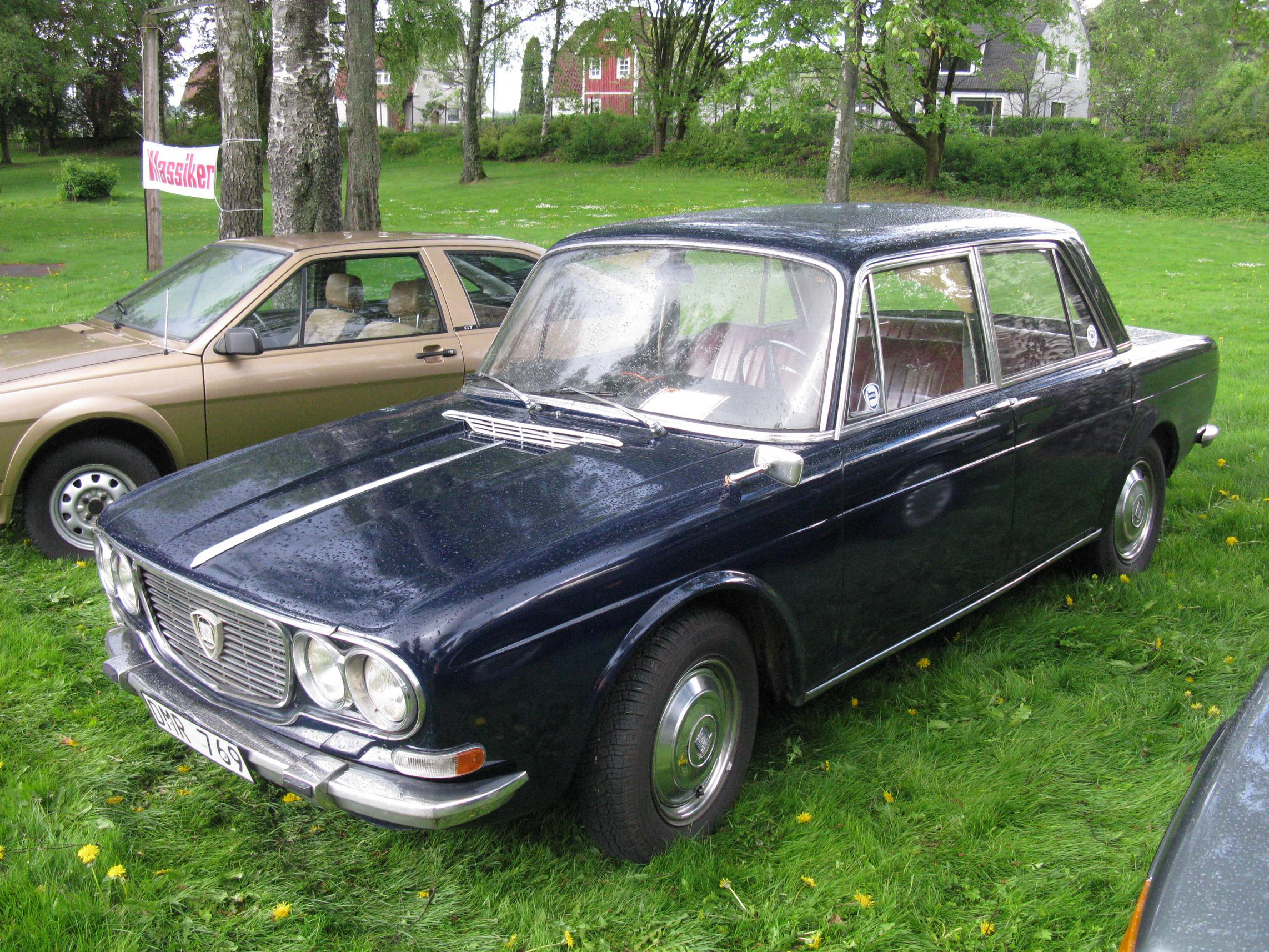
Flavia Series II saloon (819)

== One-offs and special editions ==
=== Sinthesis 2000 Berlinetta ===
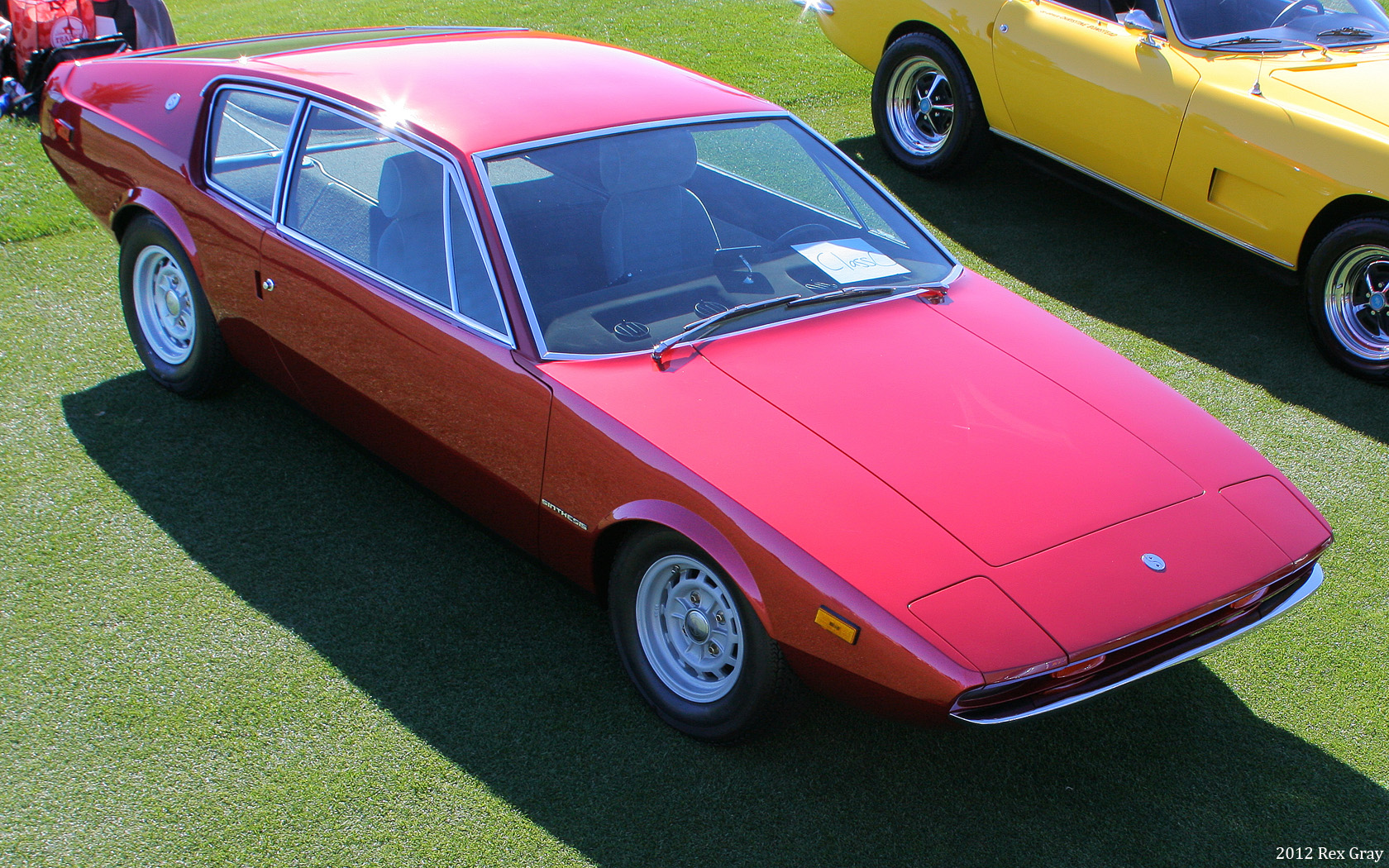
Sinthesis 2000 Berlinetta

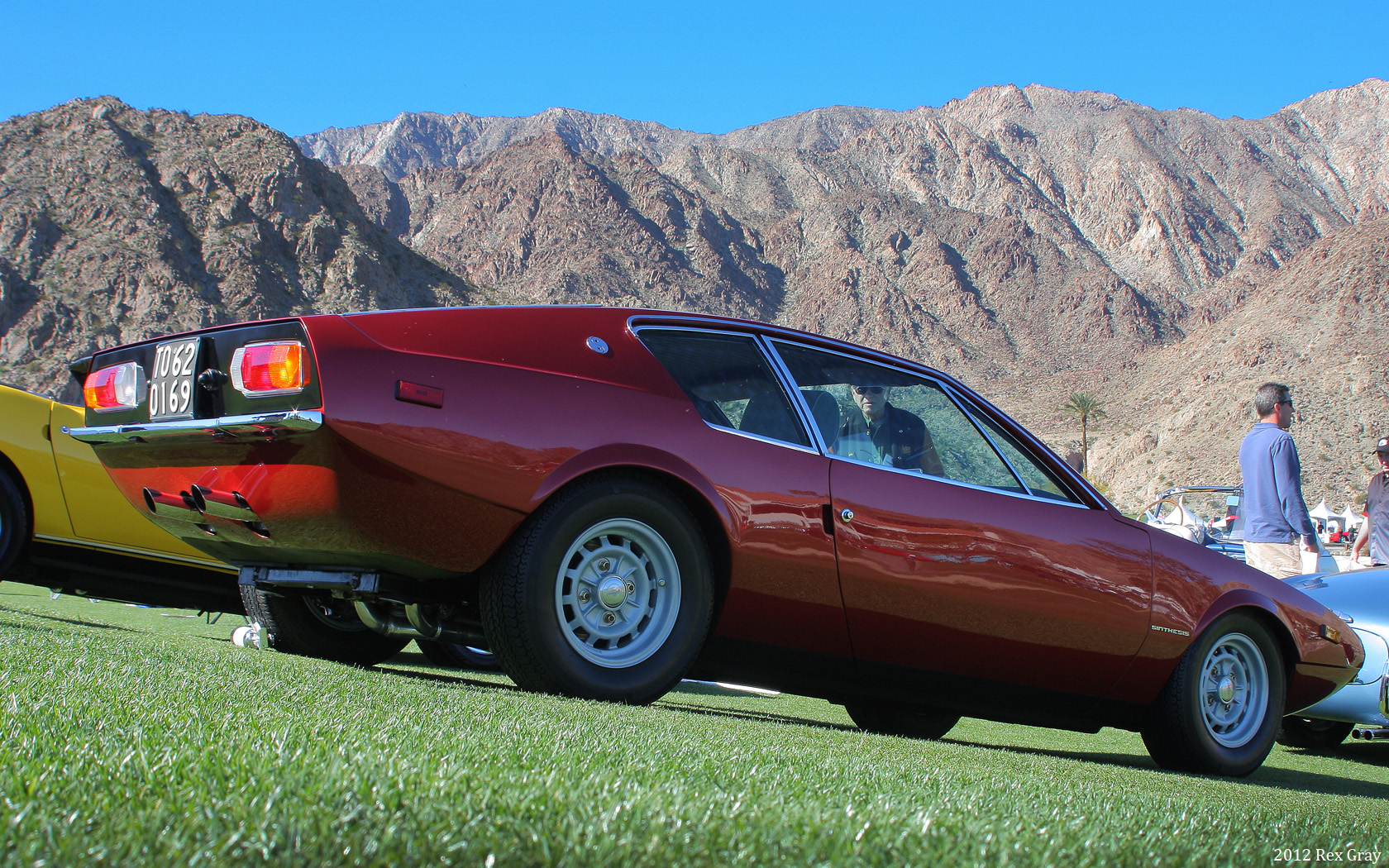
Rear view

The Sinthesis 2000 Berlinetta is a one-off coupe introduced in 1970 which was engineered by Peter Giacobbi and designed by Tom Tjaarda and was their idea of a more refined grand tourer. The name is a combination of English and Italian words highlighting the ancestry of the people working on the car. The chassis and running gear of the car were shared with the Flavia but the engine received modifications by Nardi in order to yield a power output of 130 PS (128 hp; 96 kW) at 5,000 rpm. Road tests of the car indicated a top speed in excess of 200 km/h (124 mph).

=== Flavia Super Sport ===
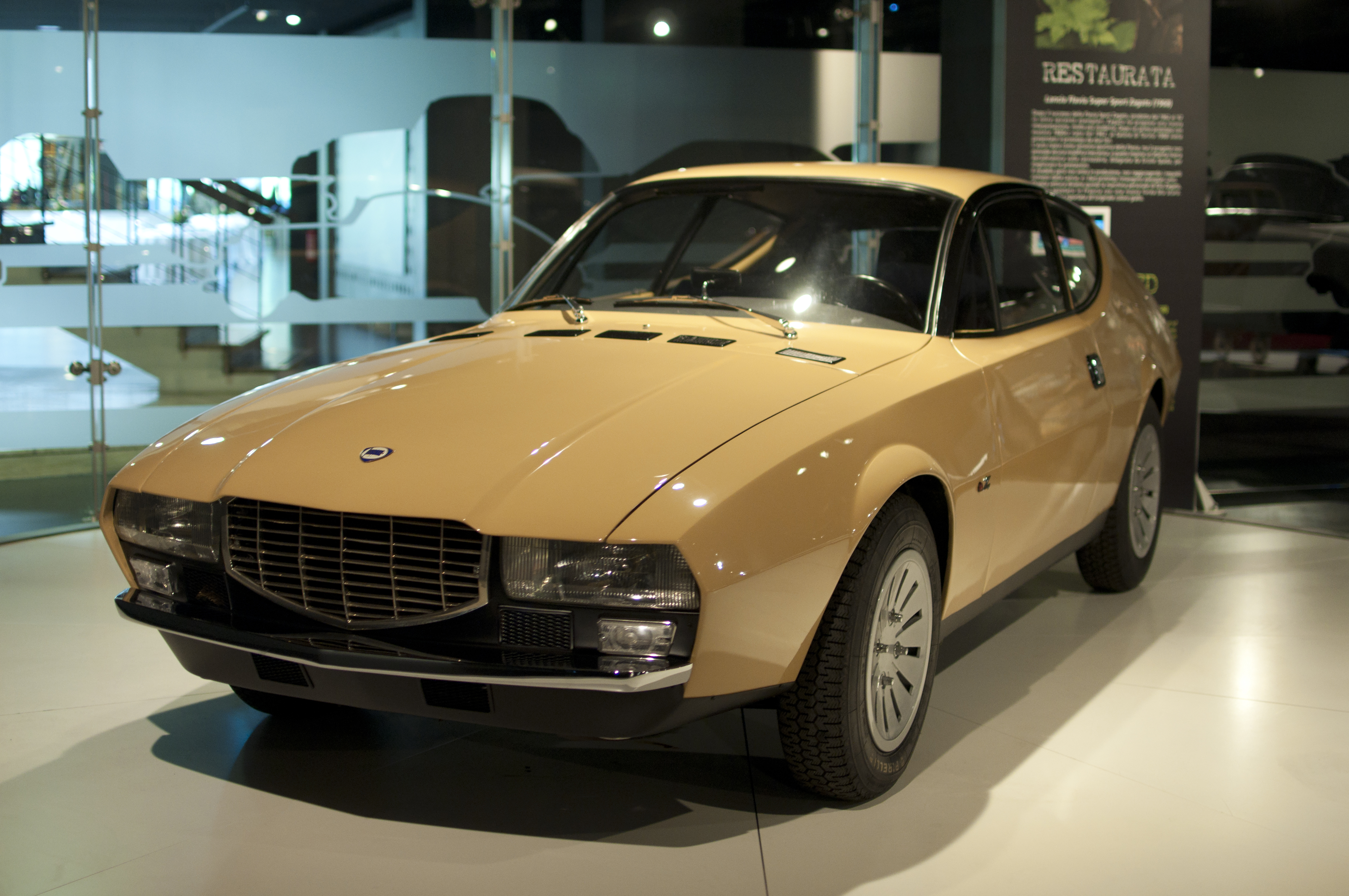
Flavia Super Sport

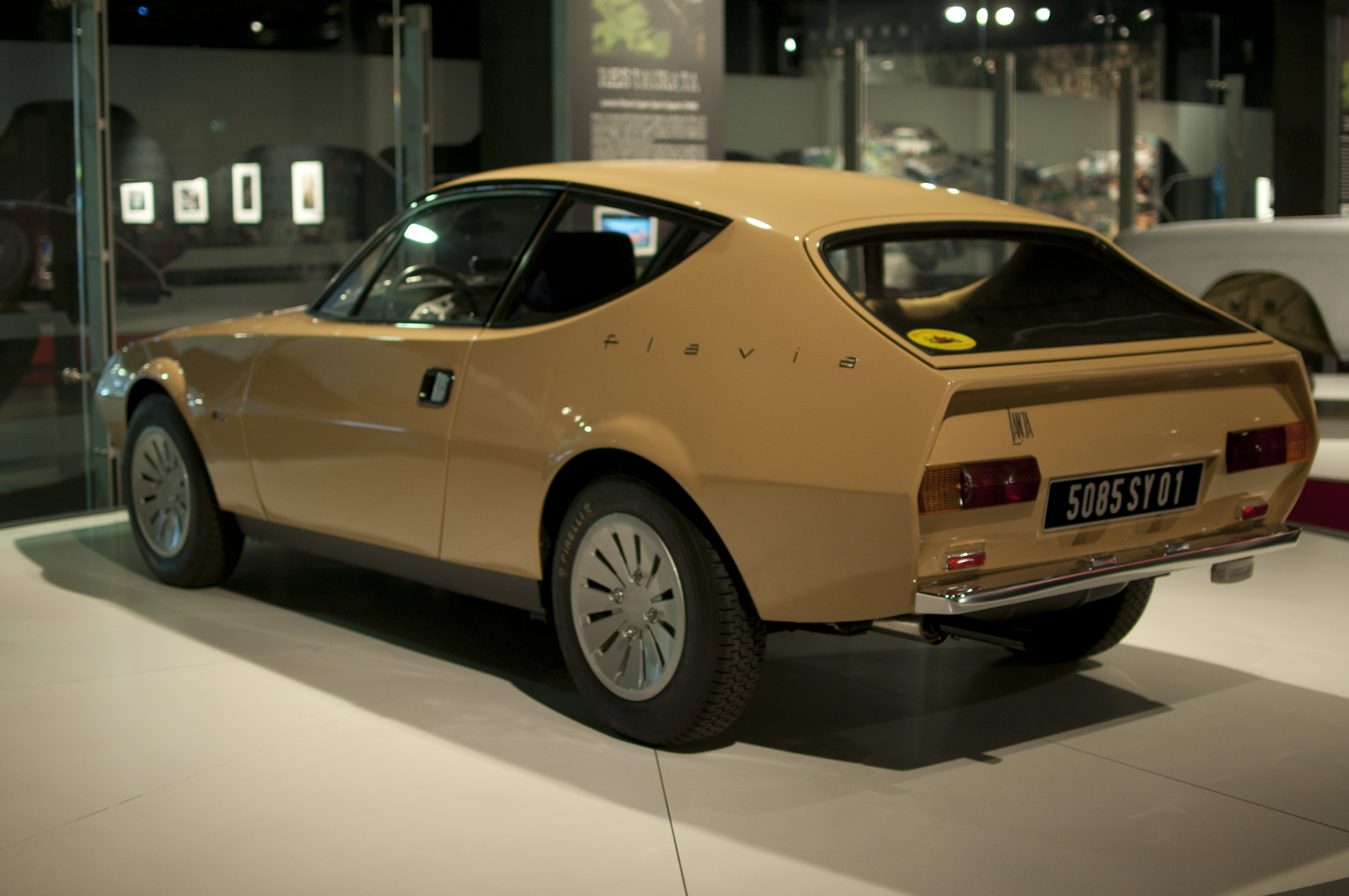
Rear view

The Flavia Super Sport was based on the Flavia Sport Zagato and introduced in 1967. It featured a shortened version of the Flavia Sport's chassis in order to improve the handling of the car. The body designed by Ercole Spada featured aerodynamic enhancements to increase overall efficiency and speed. The Super Sport featured the 1,800 Flat-4 engine from the Flavia Sport and did not include significant modifications to the running gear. A second prototype painted in bright yellow was showcased at the 1968 Turin Motor Show and featured the 1,991 cc engine. However Lancia's worsening financial situation led to the project being abandoned.

== Lancia 2000 ==
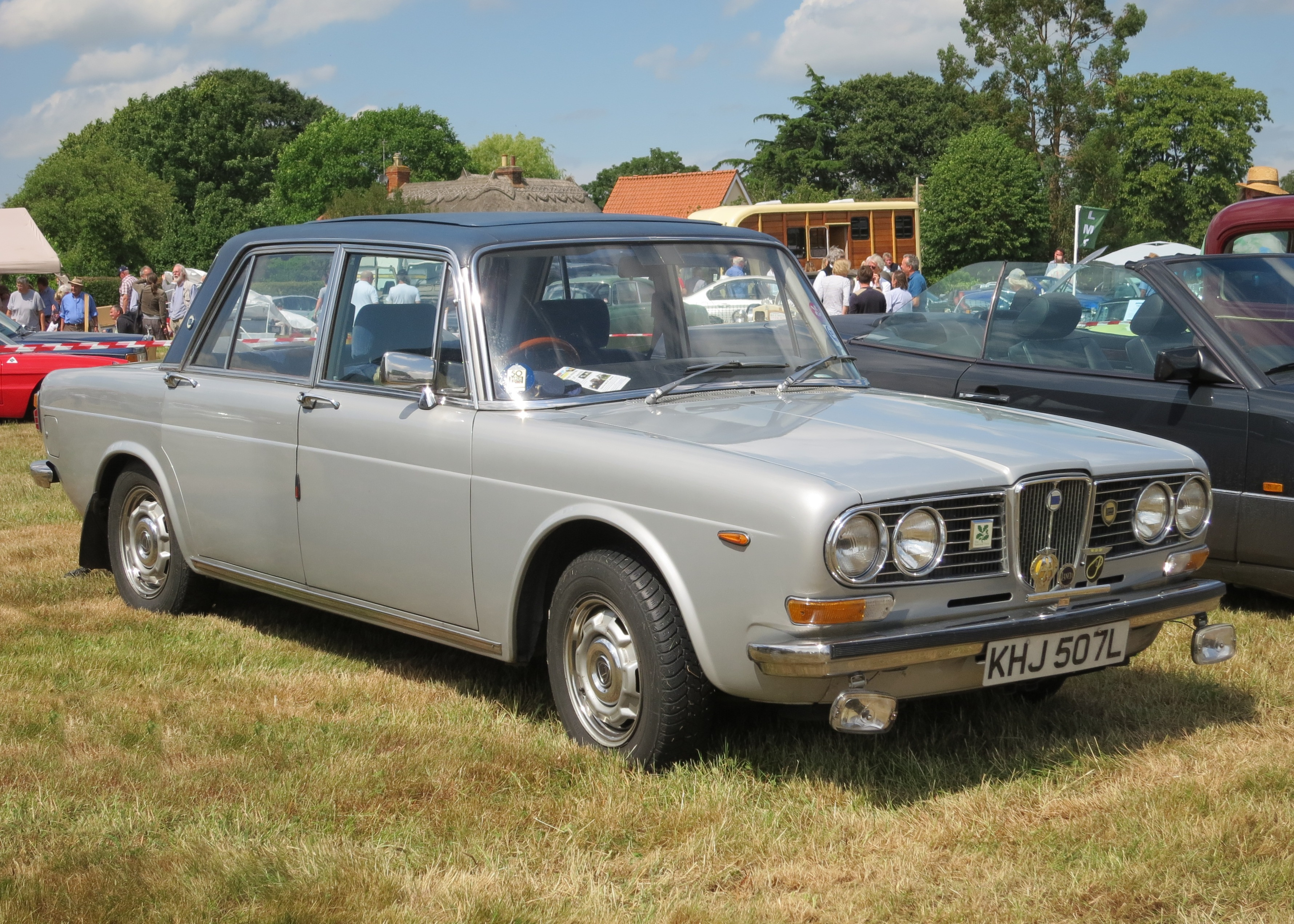
Lancia 2000 Berlina

The Flavia was revised and renamed the Lancia 2000 in 1971. The 2000 featured Girling disc brakes (replacing the Flavia 2000's Dunlops), stainless steel bumpers, and, for the fuel-injected models, Bosch D-jetronic Analog-electrovalve fuel injection. These were built until 1973 or 1974 although new models remained in stock until 1975. As with the Flavia 2000, the 2000 was only made with Pininfarina coupe and Lancia sedan bodies.
