= General Motors LS-based small-block engine =

Family of V8 and V6 engines

General Motors LS small-block engine
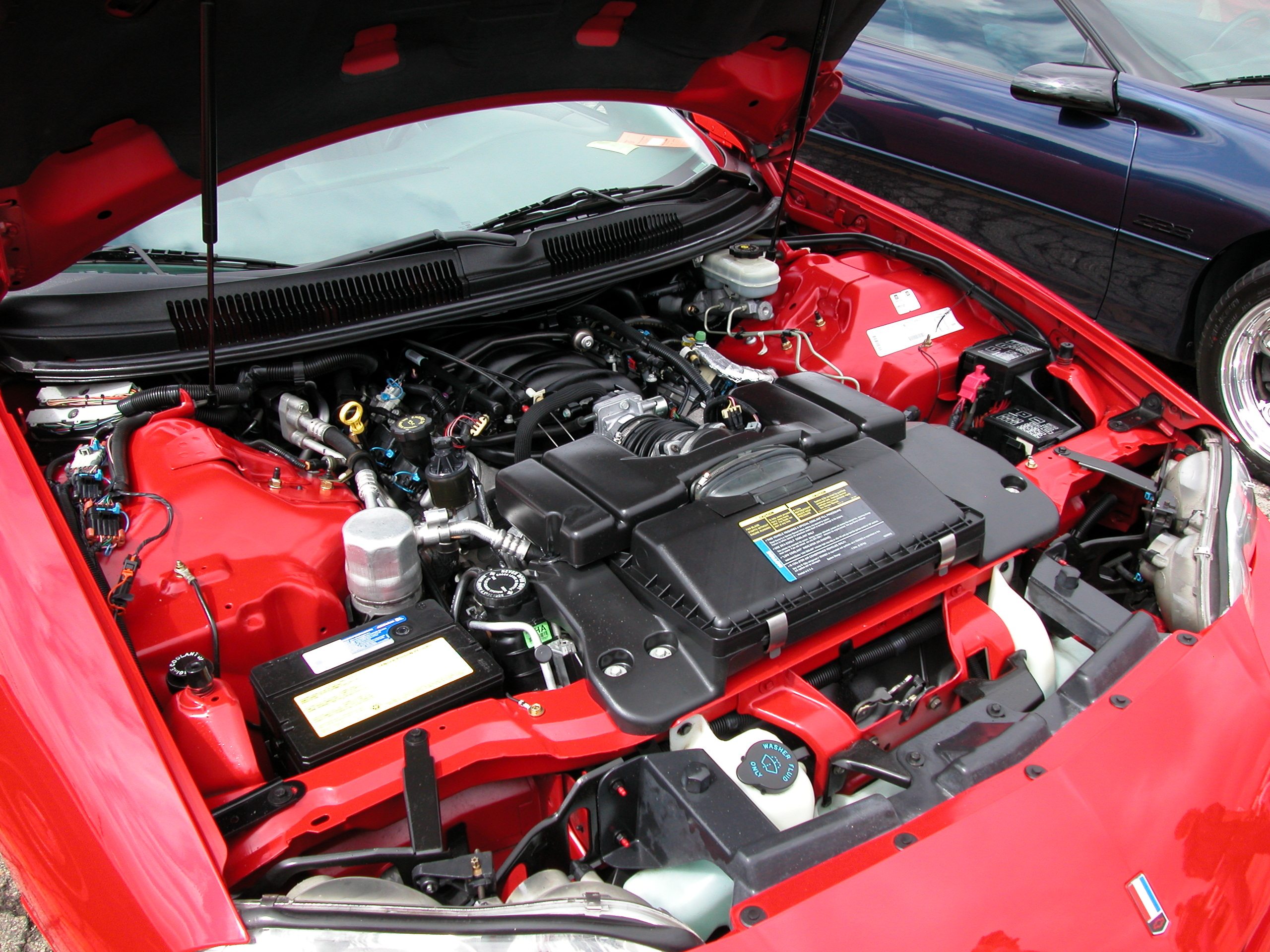
- An LS1 engine in a 1998 Chevrolet Camaro

Overview
- Manufacturer: General Motors
- Designer: Tom Stephens; Ed Koerner
- Production: 1997–present

Layout
- Configuration: 90° V8, 90° V6
- Displacement: 260–511 cu in (4.3–8.4 L)
- Cylinder bore: 3.78–4.185 in (96.0–106.3 mm)
- Piston stroke: 3.3–4.125 in (83.8–104.8 mm)
- Cylinder block material: Aluminum; Cast iron
- Cylinder head material: Aluminum; Cast iron
- Valvetrain: 16-valve, OHV (2 valves per cyl.)
- Compression ratio: 9.08:1–13.1:1

Combustion
- Fuel system: Fuel injection, carburetors (Note: The LS364 was a carbureted crate engine offered only for the aftermarket.)
- Fuel type: Gasoline, E85
- Oil system: Wet sump, Dry sump
- Cooling system: Water-cooled

Output
- Power output: 255–755 hp (190–563 kW)
- Torque output: 285–715 lb⋅ft (386–969 N⋅m)

Dimensions
- Dry weight: 402–464 lb (182–210 kg)

Chronology
- Predecessor: Chevrolet small-block engine (first and second generation)
- Successor: Chevrolet Gemini small-block engine

The General Motors LS-based small-block engines are a family of V8 and offshoot V6 engines designed and manufactured by the American automotive company General Motors. Introduced in 1997, the family is a continuation of the earlier first- and second-generation Chevrolet small-block engine, of which over 100 million have been produced and is also considered one of the most popular V8 engines ever. The LS family spans the third, fourth, and fifth generations of the small-block engines, with a sixth generation expected to enter production soon. Various small-block V8s were and still are available as crate engines.

The "LS" nomenclature originally came from the Regular Production Option (RPO) code LS1, assigned to the first engine in the Gen III engine series. The LS nickname has since been used to refer generally to all Gen III and IV engines, but that practice can be misleading, since not all engine RPO codes in those generations begin with LS. Likewise, although Gen V engines are generally referred to as "LT" small-blocks after the RPO LT1 first version, GM also used other two-letter RPO codes in the Gen V series.

The LS1 was first fitted in the Chevrolet Corvette (C5), and LS or LT engines have powered every generation of the Corvette since (with the exception of the Z06 and ZR1 variants of the eighth generation Corvette, which are powered by the unrelated Chevrolet Gemini small-block engine). Various other General Motors automobiles have been powered by LS- and LT-based engines, including sports cars such as the Chevrolet Camaro/Pontiac Firebird and Holden Commodore, trucks such as the Chevrolet Silverado, and SUVs such as the Cadillac Escalade.

A clean-sheet design, the only shared components between the Gen III engines and the first two generations of the Chevrolet small-block engine are the connecting rod bearings and valve lifters. However, the Gen III and Gen IV engines were designed with modularity in mind, and several engines of the two generations share a large number of interchangeable parts. Gen V engines do not share as much with the previous two, although the engine block is carried over, along with the connecting rods. The serviceability and parts availability for various Gen III and Gen IV engines have made them a popular choice for engine swaps in the car enthusiast and hot rodding community; this is known colloquially as an LS swap. These engines also enjoy a high degree of aftermarket support due to their popularity and affordability.

== Background ==
The brainchild of Chevrolet chief engineer Ed Cole, the first generation of the Chevrolet small-block engine was first unveiled in the 1955 Chevrolet Corvette and Chevrolet Bel Air, both powered by the 265 cu in (4,343 cc) "Turbo-Fire." The 265 Turbo-Fire distinguished itself from other engines of the era such as Cadillac's 331 series of the late 1940s and early 1950s by reducing the size and weight of various components within the engine; a compact engine block combined with a light valvetrain gave the Turbo-Fire a 40 lb (18 kg) weight reduction compared to the inline-sixes (despite having two more cylinders) that initially powered the first generation of the Corvette, alongside a significant horsepower increase of 25%. This contributed to lowering the Corvette's 0–60 mph (0–97 km/h) from 11 seconds to 8.7.

Nicknamed the "Mighty Mouse," the Turbo-Fire soon became popular within the hot rodding community too, along with scoring wins in stock car racing. A larger version of the Turbo-Fire arrived in 1957, now bored out to 3.875 in (98.4 mm). This gave the new engine a total displacement of 283 cu in (4,638 cc); this newer version was dubbed the "Super Turbo-Fire." The Super Turbo-Fire was also the first engine offered with mechanical fuel injection. The top-of-the-line model produced 283 hp (211 kW; 287 PS), giving it a 1:1 cubic inch to horsepower ratio; this lowered the Corvette's 0–60 mph (0–97 km/h) to 7.2 seconds.

General Motors would produce more powerful and larger displacement iterations of the small-block, until stringent emission regulations in the late 1960s severely limited performance. The Malaise era (roughly 1973 to 1983), as it was known, saw some of the lowest horsepower figures in several muscle and or pony car engines. This included the Corvette whose power output dropped below 200 hp (149 kW; 203 PS) despite a displacement of 350 cu in (5,735 cc).

1992 saw the second generation of Chevrolet small-block hit the market in that year's Chevrolet Corvette in the form of the LT1 small-block. It featured a new ignition system, reverse-flow cooling (cooling the cylinder heads first), and new engine block, but the valvetrain and engine mounts were carried over in order to maintain a degree of compatibility with the previous generation. Other modifications such as a better flowing intake manifold and cylinder heads gave the LT1 a power output of 300 hp (224 kW; 304 PS). The second generation culminated in the LT4 small-block, which gained a minor power increase of 30 hp (22 kW; 30 PS). Other changes included a lighter valvetrain and strengthened crankshaft.

The decision to stick with pushrod technology was seen as archaic at the time; such engines were seen as outdated compared to the smaller capacity (but more powerful and fuel efficient) overhead cam engines favored by European and Asian manufacturers. One of GM's domestic rivals, Ford, had announced plans to axe its small block engine from production in the early 1990s, in favor of its Modular engines. Another domestic rival, Chrysler Corporation, had stopped building passenger cars with V8 engines years prior, relegating them to its trucks and SUVs. Many car enthusiasts also desired a dual overhead cam engine; GM in response had developed the Northstar engines for Cadillac, but those engines were initially exclusive to that brand and not originally designed for rear-wheel-drive vehicles. Later on, Sam Winegarden, former General Motors chief engineer for small-blocks, stated that despite the stigma of the pushrod engine being "a symbol of the uncompetitiveness [sic] of the domestic industry," the decision to stick with pushrods was made on the basis that switching to overhead camshafts was unnecessary. The power requirements for the Corvette were satisfied by simply increasing engine displacement. Current General Motors chief engineer for small-blocks Jake Lee also stated that switching to overhead camshafts would also increase the height of the engine by 4 in (102 mm), rendering it too tall to fit under the hood of the Corvette.

Approval for the Gen III was granted in May 1992, after a seat-of-the-pants decision made by General Motors executives who went for a drive in two Corvettes—one equipped with a traditional pushrod engine and one with a newer dual overhead camshaft engine. Tom Stephens, then-executive director of General Motors Powertrains, was the man in charge of the project. Stephens had the task of designing an engine that was not only more powerful than the previous small-block iterations, but one that could also deliver better fuel economy and meet emissions standards. Work began in 1993, shortly after the release of the LT1 Gen II engine. A small team hand-picked from the Advanced Engineering department of General Motors was assembled to do much of the initial design work, with initial prototypes hitting test benches by the winter of 1993. Stephens also recruited Ed Koerner, a former NHRA record holder, to help with much of the hands-on work, while Stephens focused on project management issues.

== Design ==
All three generations are overhead valve engines, otherwise known as pushrod engines. Overhead valve engines have the valves mounted above the cylinder head, with a pushrod and rocker arm allowing a block-mounted camshaft to activate the valves. The advantages of an engine configuration like this (as opposed to an overhead camshaft engine) is that since the camshaft is located within the engine valley, a pushrod engine will be shorter in height compared an overhead camshaft engine. Another advantage is that there are fewer mechanical components such as timing chains and extra camshafts, which increases reliability by keeping the engine simple.

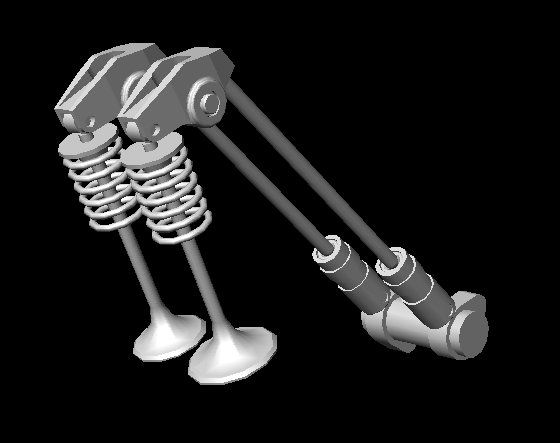
A pushrod configuration that would typically be found in a LS-based overhead valve small-block. Lobes of a rotating camshaft transmit upward motion through valve lifters to pushrods, which open valves via downward motion transferred to them by a rocker arm.

All three generations were outfitted with either aluminum or cast iron engine blocks, with all passenger car engine blocks being aluminum, whereas truck engine blocks could be either material. Every single engine was also fitted with aluminum cylinder heads, except for the 1999 and 2000 model year of the LQ4, which were cast iron. Other modifications to the cylinder heads included a redesign to include significantly better airflow, with evenly spaced exhaust and intake valves. A deeper engine skirt meant that the third and following generations were slightly larger than its predecessors; the deeper skirts strengthened the block and improved rigidity. A deep engine skirt refers to an engine block which extends below the centerline position of the crankshaft within the engine. Another feature across all generations was the 4.4 in (112 mm) bore spacing and pushrods, the former of which is also in use in the Chevrolet Gemini small-block engine. The use of aluminum allowed for further weight reduction; the 1997 LS1 was almost 100 lb (45 kg) lighter than previous cast-iron small-block iterations. GM also made extensive use of economies of scale for the LS: with the exception of the 4.8L and 7.0L engines, all variants used the same 3.622" stroke (with most of those variants using the same basic crankshaft casting), the 4.8L and 5.3L variants utilized the same block casting, and several variants used the same length connecting rod.

Other modifications include long runner intake manifolds, powder-forged connecting rods and the introduction of six-bolt main bearings (as opposed to two or four on the previous generations). Long runner intake manifolds in the LS series increases the airflow into the cylinders at low revolutions, increasing torque production at lower revolutions. Truck applications of the LS engine have even longer intake manifolds, being approximately 3 in (76 mm) taller than passenger car manifolds. Most engines were also fitted with hypereutectic pistons, replacing the previous cast pistons which were weaker and less thermally stable.

Powder-forging involves sintering a specific mixture of metals and non-metals which have been compressed in a forming press. The mixture is then quickly transferred into a traditional die cavity in a forging press and is pressed once then cooled. Powder-forging is also more cost-effective compared to traditional die forging, reducing the amount of tooling required to trim inconsistencies in hot-forged connecting rods. Stronger than the forged steel connecting rods of the previous two generations, powder-forged connecting rods have been fitted to every LS and LT engine except for the LS7.

== Generation III (1997–2007) ==
Generation III
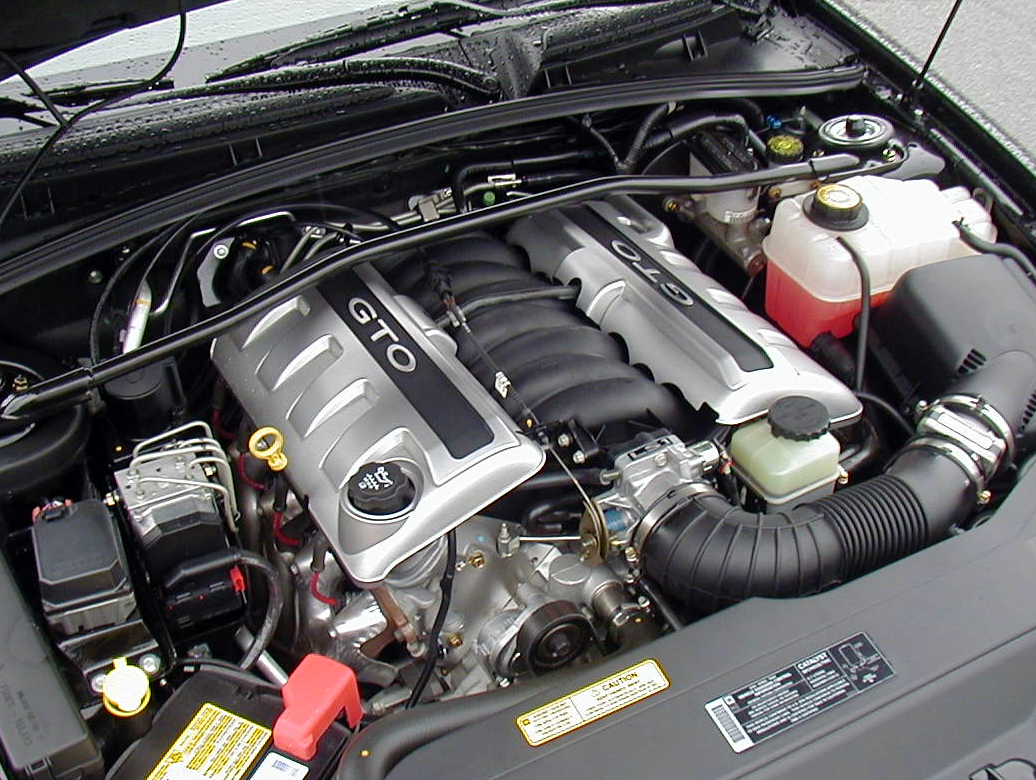
- An LS1 engine in a Pontiac GTO

Overview
- Manufacturer: General Motors
- Also called: Vortec
- Production: 1997–2007

Layout
- Configuration: 90° V8
- Displacement: 4,806 cc (293.3 cu in); 5,327 cc (325.1 cu in); 5,665 cc (345.7 cu in); 5,967 cc (364.1 cu in)
- Cylinder bore: 96 mm (3.78 in); 99 mm (3.9 in); 101.6 mm (4.00 in)
- Piston stroke: 83 mm (3.27 in); 92 mm (3.62 in)
- Cylinder block material: Aluminum; Cast iron
- Cylinder head material: Aluminum; Cast iron (1999–2000 LQ4 only)
- Valvetrain: OHV 2 valves per cylinder

Combustion
- Fuel system: Sequential multi-port fuel injection
- Fuel type: Gasoline; E85
- Oil system: Wet sump
- Cooling system: Water-cooled

Dimensions
- Dry weight: 500–580 lb (230–260 kg)

Chronology
- Predecessor: Generation I; Generation II
- Successor: Generation IV

The Generation III small-block V8 is a "clean sheet" General Motors design produced from 1997 to 2007, which replaced the Chevrolet Generation I and Generation II engine families derived from the longstanding Chevrolet small block V8 produced between 1954 and 2003.

Like the previous two generations, the Buick and Oldsmobile small blocks, the Gen III/IV can be found in many different brands. The engine blocks were cast in aluminum for car applications, and iron for most truck applications (notable exceptions include the Chevrolet TrailBlazer SS, Chevrolet SSR, and a limited run of Chevrolet Silverado/GMC Sierra extended-cab standard-box 4WD trucks).

The architecture of the LS series makes for an extremely strong engine block with the aluminum engines being nearly as strong as the iron generation I and II engines. The LS engine also used coil-near-plug style ignition to replace the distributor setup of all previous small-block based engines.

The traditional five-bolt pentagonal cylinder head pattern was replaced with a square four-bolt design (much like the 1964–1990 Oldsmobile V8), and the pistons are of the flat-topped variety (in the LS1, LS2, LS3, LS6, LS7, LQ9, and L33), while all other variants, including the new LS9 and LQ4 truck engine, received a dished version of the GM hypereutectic piston.

The cylinder firing order was changed to 1-8-7-2-6-5-4-3 so that the LS series now corresponds to the firing pattern of other modern V8 engines (for example the Ford Modular V8).

=== 3.898 in. bore blocks (1997–2005) ===
The first of the Generation IIIs, the LS1 was the progenitor of the new architecture design that would transform the entire V8 line and influence the last of the big-blocks.

==== 5.7 L ====
The Generation III 5.7L (LS1 and LS6) engines share little other than similar displacement, external dimensions, and rod bearings, with its predecessor (LT1). It is an all-aluminum 5.7 L (5,665 cc; 345.7 cu in) pushrod engine with a bore and stroke of 99 mm × 92 mm (3.898 in × 3.622 in).

===== LS1 =====
The LS1 was introduced in the 1997 Corvette, and rated at 345 hp (257 kW) at 5,600 rpm and 350 lb⋅ft (475 N⋅m) at 4,400 rpm. After improvements to the intake and exhaust manifolds in 2001, the rating improved to 350 hp (261 kW) and 365 lb⋅ft (495 N⋅m) (375 lb⋅ft (508 N⋅m) for manual-transmission Corvettes. The LS1 was used in the Corvette from 97 to 04. It was also used in 98-02 GM F-Body (Camaro & Firebird) cars with a rating of over 305–345 hp (227–257 kW), which was rumored to be conservative. The extra horsepower was claimed to come from the intake ram-air effect available in the SS and WS6 models. In Australia, continuous modifications were made to the LS1 engine throughout its lifetime, reaching 382 bhp (285 kW) and 376 lb⋅ft (510 N⋅m) in the HSV's VYII series, and a Callaway modified version named "C4B" was fitted to HSV GTS models producing 400 bhp (298 kW) and 376 lb⋅ft (510 N⋅m) of torque.

Applications:

| Year(s) | Model | Power | Torque |
|---|---|---|---|
| 1997–2004 | Chevrolet Corvette C5 | 345–350 hp (257–261 kW) at 5600 rpm | 350–375 lb⋅ft (475–508 N⋅m) at 4400 rpm |
| 1999–2006 | Chevrolet Caprice | 330–340 hp (246–254 kW) at 5200 rpm | 350–354 lb⋅ft (475–480 N⋅m) at 4000 rpm |
| 1998–2002 | Pontiac Firebird Formula, Trans Am | 305–345 hp (227–257 kW) at 5600 rpm | 335 lb⋅ft (454 N⋅m) at 4400 rpm |
| 1998–2002 | Chevrolet Camaro Z28 | 305–310 hp (227–231 kW) at 5200 rpm | 335–340 lb⋅ft (454–461 N⋅m) at 4400 rpm |
| 1998–2002 | Chevrolet Camaro SS | 320–325 hp (239–242 kW) at 5200 rpm | 345–350 lb⋅ft (468–475 N⋅m) at 4400 rpm |
| 1999–2000 | Holden VT II Commodore | 295 hp (220 kW) at 5000 rpm | 329 lb⋅ft (446 N⋅m) at 4400 rpm |
| 2000–2003 | Holden VX Commodore; Holden VU Ute | 302 hp (225 kW) at 5200 rpm | 340 lb⋅ft (461 N⋅m) at 4400 rpm |
| 2000–2003 | HSV VX/VU | 342 hp (255 kW) at 5600 rpm | 350 lb⋅ft (475 N⋅m) at 4000 rpm |
| 2002–2004 | Holden VY Commodore | 302–315 hp (225–235 kW) at 5200 rpm 329 hp (245 kW) at 5600 rpm | 350 lb⋅ft (475 N⋅m) at 4400 rpm 343 lb⋅ft (465 N⋅m) at 4000 rpm |
| 2002–2004 | HSV Y Series | 349 hp (260 kW) at 5600 rpm 382 hp (285 kW) at 5800 rpm | 350 lb⋅ft (475 N⋅m) at 4000 rpm 376 lb⋅ft (510 N⋅m) at 4800 rpm |
| 2004–2005 | Holden VZ Commodore | 315 hp (235 kW) at 5600 rpm 335 hp (250 kW) at 5600 rpm | 339 lb⋅ft (460 N⋅m) at 4000 rpm 347 lb⋅ft (470 N⋅m) at 4800 rpm |
| 2004 | Pontiac GTO | 350 hp (261 kW) at 5200 rpm | 365 lb⋅ft (495 N⋅m) at 4000 rpm |
| 2001–2004 | HSV GTO | 342–382 hp (255–285 kW) at 5600 rpm | 350 lb⋅ft (475 N⋅m) at 4400 rpm 376 lb⋅ft (510 N⋅m) at 4800 rpm |
| 1999–2005 | Holden Statesman | 295 hp (220 kW) at 5000 rpm 315–328 hp (235–245 kW) at 5200 rpm | 323–343 lb⋅ft (438–465 N⋅m) at 4400 rpm 339 lb⋅ft (460 N⋅m) at 4000 rpm |
| 2001–2005 | Holden Monaro | 302–328 hp (225–245 kW) at 5200 rpm 349 hp (260 kW) at 5600 rpm | 339–343 lb⋅ft (460–465 N⋅m) at 4400 rpm 347 lb⋅ft (470 N⋅m) at 4000 rpm |
| 2005 | HSV Z series Avalanche | 362 hp (270 kW) at 5700 rpm | 350 lb⋅ft (475 N⋅m) at 4000 rpm |

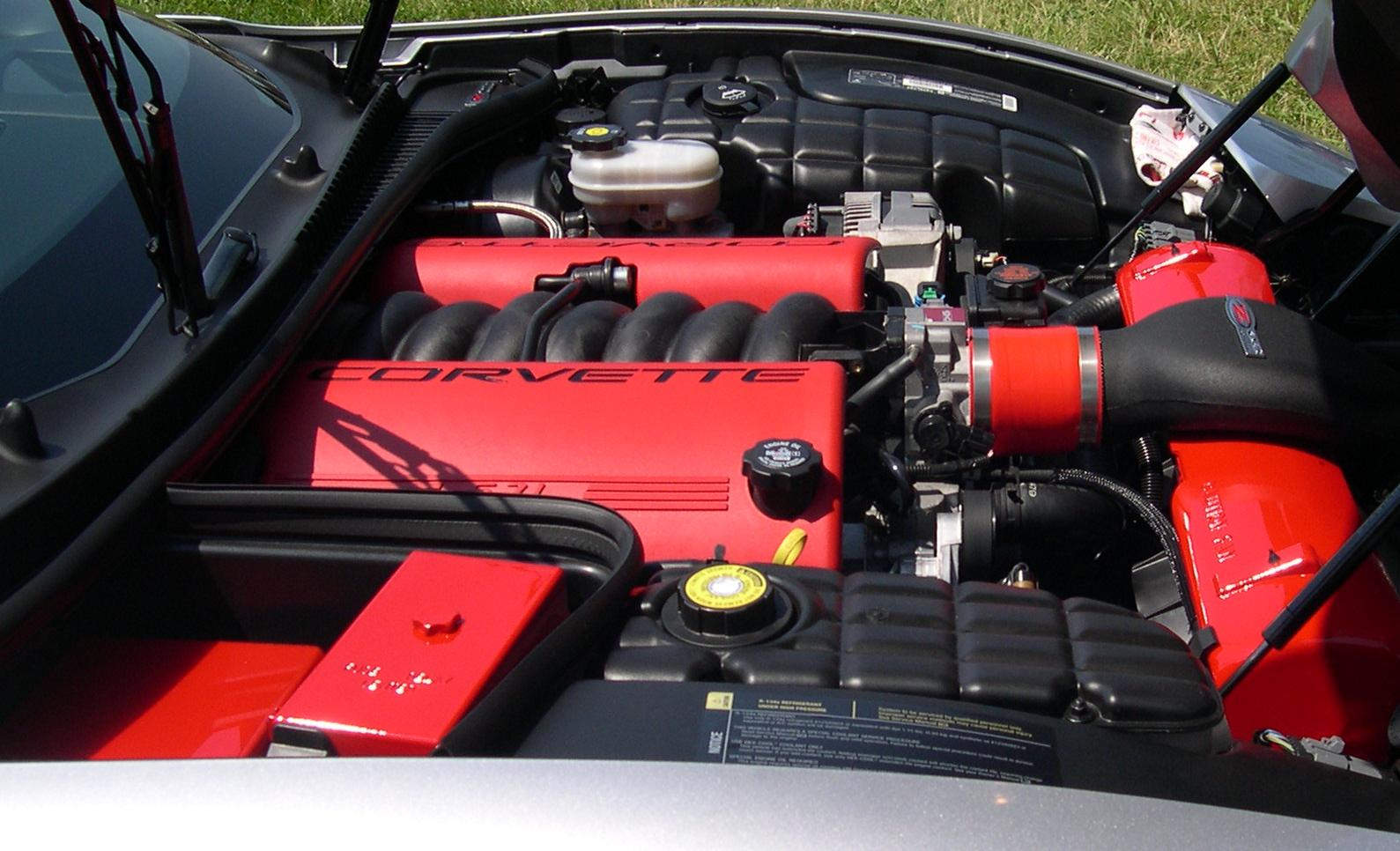
GM LS6 engine in a Chevrolet Corvette Z06

===== LS6 =====
The LS6 is a higher-output version of GM's LS1 engine and retains the same capacity. The initial 2001 LS6 produced 385 bhp (287 kW) and 385 lb⋅ft (522 N⋅m), but the engine was modified for 2002 through 2004 to produce 405 bhp (302 kW) and 400 lb⋅ft (542 N⋅m) of torque. The LS6 was originally only used in the high-performance C5 Corvette Z06 model, with the Cadillac CTS V-Series getting the 400 bhp (298 kW) engine later. The V-Series used the LS6 for two years before being replaced by the LS2 in 2006. For 2006, the Z06 replaced the LS6 with the new LS7. The LS6 shares its basic block architecture with the GM LS1 engine, but other changes were made to the design such as windows cast into the block between cylinders, improved main web strength and bay to bay breathing, an intake manifold and MAF-sensor with higher flow capacity, a camshaft with higher lift and more duration, a higher compression ratio of 10.5:1, sodium-filled exhaust valves, and a revised oiling system better suited to high lateral acceleration. LS6 intake manifolds were also used on all 2001+ LS1/6 engines. The casting number, located on the top rear edge of the block, is 12561168.

The SSC Ultimate Aero TT also utilized the LS6 block, albeit with an enlarged displacement of 6.3 L (384.4 cu in) and the addition of two turbochargers.

Applications:

| Year(s) | Model | Power | Torque |
|---|---|---|---|
| 2001–2004 | Chevrolet Corvette C5 Z06 | 385–405 hp (287–302 kW) at 6000 rpm | 385–400 lb⋅ft (522–542 N⋅m) at 4800 rpm |
| 2004–2005 | Cadillac CTS V-Series | 400 hp (298 kW) at 6000 rpm | 395 lb⋅ft (536 N⋅m) at 4800 rpm |
| 2007–2008 | SSC Ultimate Aero TT (modified) | 1,180 hp (880 kW) at 6950 rpm | 1,106 lb⋅ft (1,500 N⋅m) at 6150 rpm |

=== 3.78 in. bore blocks (1999–2007) ===
The 4.8L and the 5.3L are smaller truck versions of the LS1 and were designed to replace the 305 and the 350 in trucks. The 4.8L and 5.3L engines share the same Gen III LS-series engine block and heads (upper end) and therefore, most parts interchange freely between these engines and other variants in the LS family.

==== 4.8L LR4 ====
The Vortec 4800 LR4 (VIN code "V") is a Generation III small block V8 truck engine. Displacement is 4.8 L (4,806 cc; 293.3 cu in) with a bore and stroke of 96 mm × 83 mm (3.78 in × 3.27 in). It is the smallest of the Generation III Vortec truck engines. The LR4 engines in 1999 produced 255 hp (190 kW) while the 2000 and above models made 270–285 hp (201–213 kW) and all have a torque rating between 285–295 lb⋅ft (386–400 N⋅m), depending on the model year and application. The 2005–2006 models made 285 hp (213 kW) and 295 lb⋅ft (400 N⋅m). The LR4 was manufactured at St. Catharines, Ontario, and Romulus, Michigan. It uses flat-top pistons.

Applications:

| Year(s) | Model | Power | Torque |
|---|---|---|---|
| 2000–2006 | Chevrolet Tahoe/GMC Yukon | 270–285 hp (201–213 kW) at 5200 rpm | 285–295 lb⋅ft (386–400 N⋅m) at 4000 rpm |
| 1999–2007 | Chevrolet Silverado/GMC Sierra 1500 | 255–285 hp (190–213 kW) at 5200 rpm | 285–295 lb⋅ft (386–400 N⋅m) at 4000 rpm |
| 2003–2007 | Chevrolet Express/GMC Savana 2500/3500 | 275–285 hp (205–213 kW) at 5200 rpm | 290–295 lb⋅ft (393–400 N⋅m) at 4000 rpm |

==== 5.3 L ====
The Vortec 5300, or LM7/L59/LM4, is a V8 truck engine. It is a longer-stroked by 9 mm (0.35 in) version of the Vortec 4800 and replaced the L31. L59 denoted a flexible-fuel version of the standard-fuel LM7 engine. Displacement is 5.3 L (5,327 cc; 325.1 cu in) from a bore and stroke of 96 mm × 92 mm (3.78 in × 3.62 in). Vortec 5300s were built in St. Catharines, Ontario, and Romulus, Michigan. The aluminum block variants, the LM4 and the L33, share the same displacement, but instead use an aluminum block with cast-in cylinder liners, much like the LS1.

===== LM7 =====
The Vortec 5300 LM7 (VIN code 8th digit "T") was introduced in 1999. The "garden variety" Generation III V8 has a cast-iron block and aluminum heads.

The 1999 LM7 engine produced 270 hp (201 kW) and 315 lb⋅ft (427 N⋅m) of torque.

The 2000–2003 engines produced 285 hp (213 kW) and 325 lb⋅ft (441 N⋅m) of torque.

The 2004–2007 engines produced 295 hp (220 kW) and 335 lb⋅ft (454 N⋅m) of torque.

The stock cam specifications at .050 lift are: 190/191 duration, .466/.457 lift, 114 LSA, 112/116 timing.

Applications:

| Year(s) | Model | Power | Torque |
|---|---|---|---|
| 2002–2005 | Cadillac Escalade 2WD | 285–295 hp (213–220 kW) | 325–335 lb⋅ft (441–454 N⋅m) |
| 2002–2006 | Chevrolet Avalanche 1500 | 285–295 hp (213–220 kW) | 325–335 lb⋅ft (441–454 N⋅m) |
| 2003–2007 | Chevrolet Express/GMC Savana 1500/2500 | 285–295 hp (213–220 kW) | 325–335 lb⋅ft (441–454 N⋅m) |
| 1999–2007 | Chevrolet Silverado/GMC Sierra 1500 (and 1999–2000 2500) | 270–295 hp (201–220 kW) | 315–335 lb⋅ft (427–454 N⋅m) |
| 2000–2006 | Chevrolet Suburban/GMC Yukon XL 1500 | 285–295 hp (213–220 kW) | 325–335 lb⋅ft (441–454 N⋅m) |
| 2000–2006 | Chevrolet Tahoe/GMC Yukon | 285–295 hp (213–220 kW) | 325–335 lb⋅ft (441–454 N⋅m) |

===== L59 =====
The Vortec 5300 L59 (VIN code "Z") is a flexible-fuel version of the LM7. The 2002–2003 L59 made 285 hp (213 kW) and 320 lb⋅ft (434 N⋅m), while the 2004–2007 L59 made 295 hp (220 kW) and 335 lb⋅ft (454 N⋅m).

Applications:

| Year(s) | Model | Power | Torque |
|---|---|---|---|
| 2002–2006 | Chevrolet Tahoe/GMC Yukon | 285–295 hp (213–220 kW) | 320–335 lb⋅ft (434–454 N⋅m) |
| 2002–2006 | Chevrolet Suburban/GMC Yukon XL 1500 | 285–295 hp (213–220 kW) | 320–335 lb⋅ft (434–454 N⋅m) |
| 2005–2006 | Chevrolet Avalanche 1500 | 285–295 hp (213–220 kW) | 320–335 lb⋅ft (434–454 N⋅m) |
| 2002–2007 | Chevrolet Silverado/GMC Sierra 1500 | 285–295 hp (213–220 kW) | 320–335 lb⋅ft (434–454 N⋅m) |

===== LM4 =====
The Vortec 5300 LM4 (VIN code "P") is an aluminum block version of the LM7, and had a short production life, as did the specific vehicles in which LM4s are found. LM4s made 290 hp (216 kW) and 325 lb⋅ft (441 N⋅m). The LM4 and LM7 should not be confused with the L33, described below.

Applications:

| Year(s) | Model | Power | Torque |
|---|---|---|---|
| 2003–2004 | Isuzu Ascender | 290 hp (216 kW) at 5200 rpm | 325 lb⋅ft (441 N⋅m) at 4000 rpm |
| 2003–2004 | GMC Envoy XL | 290 hp (216 kW) at 5200 rpm | 325 lb⋅ft (441 N⋅m) at 4000 rpm |
| 2003–2004 | Chevrolet SSR | 290 hp (216 kW) at 5200 rpm | 325 lb⋅ft (441 N⋅m) at 4000 rpm |
| 2004 | GMC Envoy XUV | 290 hp (216 kW) at 5200 rpm | 325 lb⋅ft (441 N⋅m) at 4000 rpm |
| 2004 | Buick Rainier | 290 hp (216 kW) at 5200 rpm | 325 lb⋅ft (441 N⋅m) at 4000 rpm |
| 2003–2005 | Chevrolet TrailBlazer EXT | 290 hp (216 kW) at 5200 rpm | 325 lb⋅ft (441 N⋅m) at 4000 rpm |

===== L33 =====
The Vortec 5300 L33 (VIN code "B") was marketed as the Vortec 5300 HO. While it used the same aluminum block as was used in the LM4, the L33 included some major differences from the LM4, resulting in higher output than the LM4 and LM7. Instead of the LM4's dished pistons, the L33 used the 4.8L's flat top pistons. It also used 799 cylinder heads, identical to 243 castings found on LS6s and LS2s, lacking only LS6-spec valve springs and lightweight valves. This combination raised the compression from 9.5:1 to 10.0:1. The L33 also used a unique camshaft not shared with any other engine, with the specifications at .050 duration being: 193 duration, .482 lift, 116 LSA. As a result, power increased by 15 hp (11 kW), to 310 hp (230 kW) and 335 lb⋅ft (454 N⋅m). It was exclusively available in extended-cab standard-bed 4WD pickup trucks. Only 25% of 2005 Chevrolet/GMC full-size pickup trucks had an L33 engine.

Applications:

| Year(s) | Model | Power | Torque |
|---|---|---|---|
| 2005–2007 | Chevrolet Silverado 1500 4WD/GMC Sierra 1500 4WD | 310 hp (231 kW) at 5200 rpm | 335 lb⋅ft (454 N⋅m) at 4000 rpm |

=== 4.00 in. bore blocks (1999–2007) ===
The 6.0 L is a larger version of the LS engine. 6.0 L blocks were cast of iron, designed to bridge the gap between the new small blocks and big blocks in truck applications. There were two versions of this engine: LQ4 and LQ9, the latter being more performance oriented.

==== 6.0 L ====
The Vortec 6000 is a V8 truck engine. Displacement is 6.0 L (5,967 cc; 364.1 cu in) from a bore and stroke of 101.6 mm × 92 mm (4.00 in × 3.62 in). It is an iron/aluminum (1999 and 2000 model year engines had cast iron heads) design and produces 300 to 345 hp (224 to 257 kW) and 360 to 380 lb⋅ft (488 to 515 N⋅m).

===== LQ4 =====
The Vortec 6000 LQ4 (VIN code "U") is a V8 truck engine. It produces 300 to 335 hp (224 to 250 kW) and 360 to 380 lb⋅ft (488 to 515 N⋅m). LQ4s were built in Romulus, Michigan, and Silao, Mexico.

Applications:

| Year(s) | Model | Power | Torque |
|---|---|---|---|
| 1999–2007 | Chevrolet Silverado/GMC Sierra 1500HD/2500/2500HD/3500 | 300 hp (224 kW; 304 PS) at 4400 rpm | 360 lb⋅ft (488 N⋅m) at 4000 rpm |
| 2001 | GMC Sierra C3 | 325 hp (242 kW; 330 PS) at 5200 rpm | 370 lb⋅ft (502 N⋅m) at 4000 rpm |
| 2002–2007 | GMC Sierra Denali | 325 hp (242 kW; 330 PS) at 5200 rpm | 370 lb⋅ft (502 N⋅m) at 4000 rpm |
| 2000–2006 | Chevrolet Suburban 2500/GMC Yukon XL 2500 | 300–320 hp (224–239 kW; 304–324 PS) at 5200 rpm | 355–375 lb⋅ft (481–508 N⋅m) at 4000 rpm |
| 2002–2007 | Hummer H2 | 316–325 hp (236–242 kW; 320–330 PS) at 5200 rpm | 360–365 lb⋅ft (488–495 N⋅m) at 4000 rpm |
| 2002–2006 | GMC Yukon/Yukon XL Denali and Chevrolet Suburban 1500 LTZ | 325–335 hp (242–250 kW; 330–340 PS) at 5200 rpm | 370–380 lb⋅ft (502–515 N⋅m) at 4000 rpm |
| 2003–2007 | Chevrolet Express/GMC Savana 2500/3500 | 300–325 hp (224–242 kW; 304–330 PS) at 4400 rpm | 360–375 lb⋅ft (488–508 N⋅m) at 4000 rpm |
| 2003–2008 | Chevrolet W-Series/GMC W-Series/Isuzu NPR | 300–325 hp (224–242 kW; 304–330 PS) at 4400 rpm | 360–375 lb⋅ft (488–508 N⋅m) at 4000 rpm |

===== LQ9 =====
The Vortec HO 6000 or VortecMAX (VIN code "N") is a special high-output version of the Vortec 6000 V8 truck engine originally designed for Cadillac in 2002. This engine was renamed as the VortecMAX for 2006. It features high-compression (10:1) flat-top pistons for an extra 20 hp (15 kW) and 10 lb⋅ft (14 N⋅m), bringing output to 345 hp (257 kW) and 380 lb⋅ft (515 N⋅m). Vehicles fitted with the LQ9 were backed by either a 3.73:1 (Escalade) or 4.10:1 (pickups) rear axle ratio. LQ9s were built only in Romulus, Michigan.

| Year(s) | Model | Power | Torque |
|---|---|---|---|
| 2002–2006 | Cadillac Escalade AWD | 345 hp (257 kW) at 5200 rpm | 380 lb⋅ft (515 N⋅m) at 4000 rpm |
| 2005–2006 | Cadillac Escalade 2WD | 345 hp (257 kW) at 5200 rpm | 380 lb⋅ft (515 N⋅m) at 4000 rpm |
| 2002–2006 | Cadillac Escalade EXT | 345 hp (257 kW) at 5200 rpm | 380 lb⋅ft (515 N⋅m) at 4000 rpm |
| 2003–2006 | Cadillac Escalade ESV | 345 hp (257 kW) at 5200 rpm | 380 lb⋅ft (515 N⋅m) at 4000 rpm |
| 2003–2007 | Chevrolet Silverado SS & H/O Edition | 345 hp (257 kW) at 5200 rpm | 380 lb⋅ft (515 N⋅m) at 4000 rpm |
| 2005–2006 | GMC Sierra Denali | 345 hp (257 kW) at 5200 rpm | 380 lb⋅ft (515 N⋅m) at 4000 rpm |
| 2006–2007 | Chevrolet Silverado Classic VortecMAX/GMC Sierra Classic VortecMAX | 345 hp (257 kW) at 5200 rpm | 380 lb⋅ft (515 N⋅m) at 4000 rpm |

== Generation IV (2005–2020) ==
Generation IV
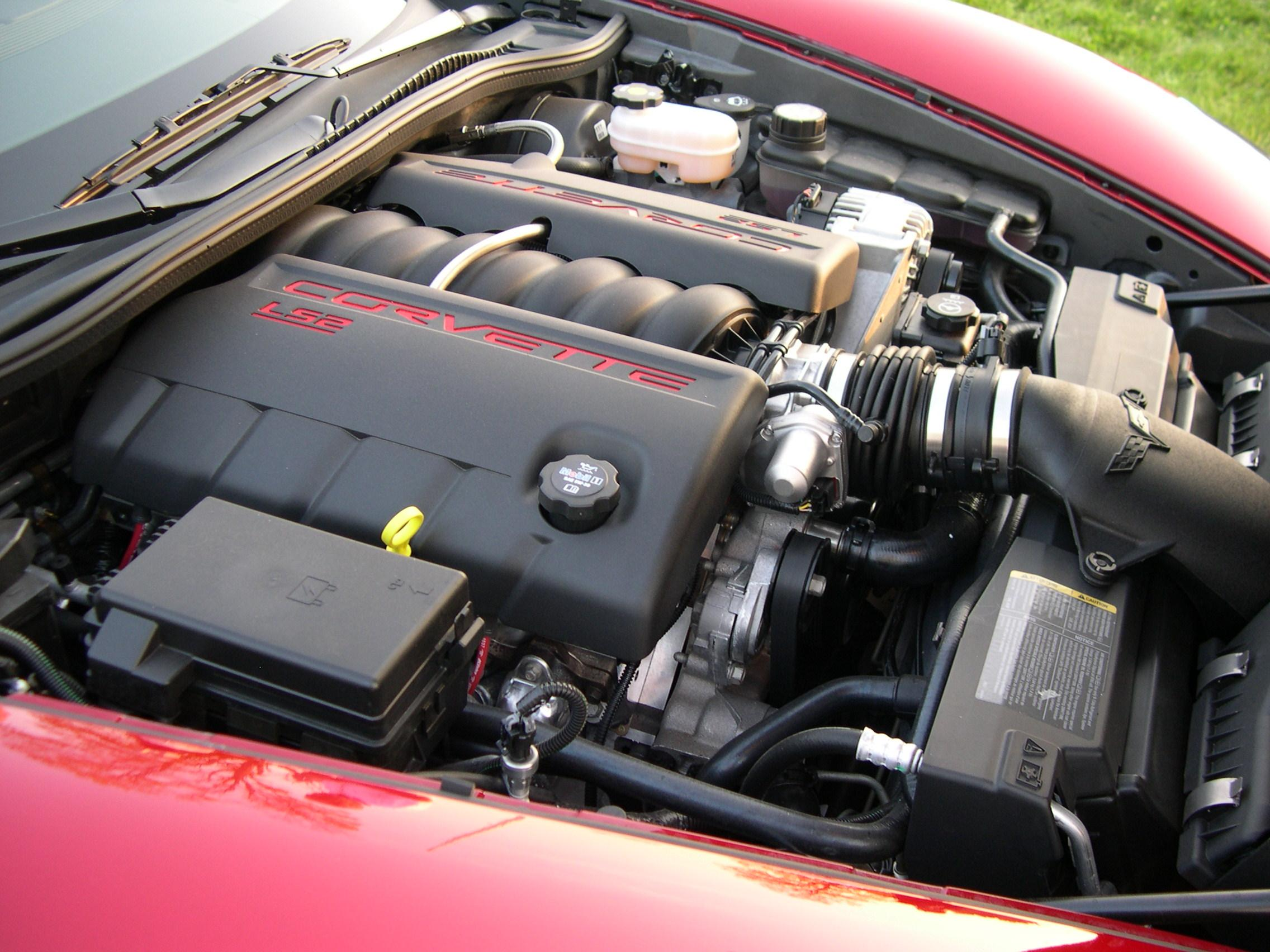
- GM LS2 engine in a 2005 Chevrolet Corvette C6

Overview
- Manufacturer: General Motors
- Also called: Vortec
- Production: 2004–2020

Layout
- Configuration: 90° V8
- Displacement: 4,806 cc (293.3 cu in); 5,327 cc (325.1 cu in); 5,967 cc (364.1 cu in); 6,162 cc (376.0 cu in); 7,011 cc (427.8 cu in)
- Cylinder bore: 96 mm (3.78 in); 101.6 mm (4.00 in); 103.25 mm (4.065 in); 104.8 mm (4.126 in); 106.3 mm (4.185 in)
- Piston stroke: 83 mm (3.27 in); 92 mm (3.62 in); 101.6 mm (4.00 in); 104.8 mm (4.126 in)
- Cylinder block material: Aluminum; Cast iron
- Cylinder head material: Aluminum
- Valvetrain: OHV 2 valves per cylinder

Combustion
- Supercharger: Eaton four-lobe Roots type (LS9 & LSA)
- Fuel system: Sequential multi-port fuel injection
- Fuel type: Gasoline; E85
- Oil system: Wet sump Dry sump
- Cooling system: Water-cooled

Chronology
- Predecessor: Generation III
- Successor: Generation V

In 2004, the Generation III was superseded by the Generation IV. This category of engines has provisions for high-displacement ranges up to 7.4 L (7,441 cc; 454.1 cu in) and power output to 776 bhp (579 kW). Based on the Generation III design, the Generation IV was designed with displacement on demand in mind, a technology that allows every other cylinder in the firing order to be deactivated. It can also accommodate variable valve timing.

A three-valve-per-cylinder design was originally slated for the LS7, which would have been a first for a GM pushrod engine, but the idea was shelved owing to design complexities and when the same two-valve configuration as the other Generation III and IV engines proved to be sufficient to meet the goals for the LS7.

=== 4.00 in. bore blocks (2005–2020) ===
This family of blocks was the first of the generation IV small block with the LS2 being the progenitor of this family and generation. This family of blocks has seen a wide range of applications from performance vehicles to truck usage.

==== 6.0 L ====
The Generation IV 6000 is a V8 engine that displaces 6.0 L (5,972 cc; 364.4 cu in) from a bore and stroke of 101.6 mm × 92 mm (4.000 in × 3.622 in). It features either a cast iron or aluminum engine block with cast aluminum heads. Certain versions feature variable cam phasing, Active Fuel Management, and flex-fuel capability.

===== LS2 =====
LS2 can also refer to the 1973–1974 Super Duty 455 cu in (7.5 L) Pontiac V8 engine
LS2 can also refer to the 1985 Oldsmobile Diesel V6 engine.

The LS2 was introduced as the Corvette's new base engine for the 2005 model year. It also appeared as the standard powerplant for the 2005–2006 GTO. It produces 400 bhp (298 kW) at 6000 rpm and 400 lb⋅ft (542 N⋅m) at 4400 rpm from a slightly larger displacement of 6.0 L (5,967 cc; 364.1 cu in). It is similar to the high-performance LS6, but with improved torque throughout the rpm range. The LS2 uses the "243" casting heads used on the LS6 (although without the sodium-filled valves), a smaller camshaft, and an additional 18 cubic inches (290 cc). The compression of the LS2 was also raised to 10.9:1 compared to the LS1s' 10.25:1 and the LS6s' 10.5:1. The LS2 in the E-series HSVs are modified in Australia to produce 412 bhp (307 kW) and 412 lb⋅ft (559 N⋅m) of torque. The LS2 in the Chevrolet TrailBlazer SS and the Saab 9-7X Aero are rated at 395 bhp (295 kW) (2006–2007) or 390 bhp (291 kW) (2008–2009) and 400 lb⋅ft (542 N⋅m) of torque due to a different (sometimes referred to as a "truck") intake manifold that produces more torque at lower rpms.

The LS2 is also used as the basis of the NASCAR Specification Engine that is used as an optional engine in NASCAR's Camping World Series East and West divisions starting in 2006, and starting in 2010 may also be used on tracks shorter than two kilometers (1.25 miles) in the Camping World Truck Series.

A version of the NASCAR V8 cylinder block cast in compacted graphite iron by Grainger & Worrall won the UK's Casting of the Year Award 2010.

Applications:
- 2005–2007 Chevrolet Corvette
- 2005–2006 Chevrolet SSR
- 2006–2009 Chevrolet TrailBlazer SS
- 2006–2007 Cadillac CTS-V
- 2005–2008 Holden Monaro family:
  - 2005–2006 HSV Coupé GTO
  - 2005–2006 HSV SV6000
  - 2005–2008 HSV Clubsport R8, Maloo R8, Senator Signature, and GTS
  - 2005–2008 HSV Grange
  - 2005–2006 Pontiac GTO (peak power at 5200 rpm, peak torque at 4000 rpm)
  - 2005–2006 Vauxhall Monaro VXR
  - 2007–2009 Vauxhall VXR8
- 2008–2009 Saab 9-7X Aero
- 2024 Ginetta Akula

===== L76 =====
The L76 is derived from the LS2, and like the LS2 it features an aluminum engine block. However, the L76 does feature Active fuel management (AFM). While the displacement on demand technology was disabled on Holdens, this feature is enabled on the 2008 Pontiac G8 GT and subsequently refitted in the 2009 model Holdens with AFM enabled, but only on models fitted with the 6L80 Automatic Transmission. The engine also meets Euro III emissions requirements. Output is 348 bhp (260 kW) at 5600 rpm and 376 lb⋅ft (510 N⋅m) at 4400 rpm for the Holden variant, and 361 bhp (269 kW) and 385 lb⋅ft (522 N⋅m) for the G8 GT.; the G8 would later be rerated at 355 bhp (265 kW) and 381 lb⋅ft (517 N⋅m) midway through the 2009 model year, due to the addition of a second pair of catalytic converters. The Vortec 6000 or new VortecMAX version is based on the Holden L76 engine, and features variable cam phasing, along with Active Fuel Management. It can be considered the replacement for the Generation III LQ9 engine. It produces 367 hp (274 kW) at 5400 rpm and 375 lb⋅ft (508 N⋅m) at 4400 rpm. Production of the truck-spec L76 started in late 2006, and it was only available with the new body style Silverado and Sierra, as well as the then-new Suburban, Avalanche, and GMC Yukon XL. The final year for the truck-spec L76 was 2009 for all five applications; it was replaced by the 6.2L L9H engine for MY 2010 in the pickup trucks, but the SUVs did not get a replacement.

Applications:
- 2006 Holden VZ Commodore – those built from February 2006 until July 2006 (the release of the VE series).
- 2006 Holden WL Statesman/Caprice – those built from February 2006 until September 2006 (the release of the WM series).
- 2008–2009 Pontiac G8 GT
- 2008–2010 Holden VE Commodore (automatic only)
- 2008–2010 Holden VE Ute (automatic only)
- 2008–2010 Holden WM Statesman/Caprice
- 2007–2009 Chevrolet Suburban 1500
- 2007–2009 Chevrolet Avalanche
- 2007–2009 Chevrolet Silverado 1500
- 2007–2009 GMC Sierra 1500
- 2007–2009 GMC Yukon XL
- 2020 Ginetta Akula

===== L98 =====
The L98 is a slightly modified version of the L76, specific to Holden vehicles. Since Holden did not use the displacement on demand technology of the L76, some redundant hardware was removed to form the L98. Power increased to 270 kW (362 bhp) at 5700 rpm and 530 N⋅m (391 lb⋅ft) at 4400 rpm.

Applications:
- 2006–2013 Chevrolet Caprice
- 2006–2007 Holden VZ Ute
- 2006–2010 Holden VE Commodore (manual only from 2008 to 2010)
- 2006–2009 Holden VE Calais
- 2006–2010 Holden VE Ute (manual only from 2008 to 2010)
- 2006–2008 Holden WM Statesman/Caprice

===== L77 =====
L77 can also refer to the 455 Oldsmobile large crank journal engine.

L77 engines were released in the Holden Commodore Series II VE range in both manual and automatic transmissions, along with the Chevrolet Caprice PPV (police car). The L77 differs from the L76 with its inclusion of Flex-fuel capability, allowing it to run on E85 fuel. The L77 is rated at 270 kW (362 hp) and 530 N⋅m (391 lb⋅ft) of torque in the manual Commodore SS and SS-V, in automatic Commodores it is rated at 260 kW (349 hp) and 517 N⋅m (381 lb⋅ft) of torque.

Applications:

- 2010–2013 Holden VE II Commodore
- 2013–2015 Holden VF Commodore
- 2010–2013 Holden VE II Ute
- 2013–2015 Holden VF Ute
- 2010–2013 Holden WM Caprice
- 2013–2015 Holden WN Caprice
- 2011–2017 Chevrolet Caprice

===== LY6 =====
The LY6 is a Generation IV small-block V8 truck engine with a cast-iron block. It shares the same bore and stroke as its LQ4 predecessor. Like other Gen IV engines, it features variable valve timing. It generated 360 hp (268 kW) at 5,400 rpm and 380 lb⋅ft (515 N⋅m) of torque at 4,200 rpm using "regular" gas, or 87 octane. Redline is 6,000 rpm and the compression ratio is 9.6:1. This engine uses L92 / LS3 style rectangle port cylinder heads, though without the sodium-filled exhaust valves of the LS3.

Applications:

- 2007–2009 Chevrolet Silverado 2500HD/3500HD
- 2007–2009 GMC Sierra 2500HD/3500HD
- 2007–2013 Chevrolet Suburban 2500
- 2007–2013 GMC Yukon XL 2500
- 2008–2009 Chevrolet Express/GMC Savana 2500/3500/4500

===== L96 =====
The L96 is essentially identical to its predecessor, the LY6. The primary difference is that the L96 is flex-fuel capable, while the LY6 is not.

Applications:

- 2010–2019 Chevrolet Silverado 2500HD/3500HD
- 2010–2019 GMC Sierra 2500HD/3500HD
- 2010–2013 Chevrolet Suburban 2500
- 2010–2013 GMC Yukon XL 2500
- 2016–2020 Chevrolet Suburban 3500HD
- 2010–2020 Chevrolet Express/GMC Savana 2500/3500/4500

===== LFA =====
The LFA (VIN code "5") is a Generation IV small-block V8 truck engine. The LFA variant is used in the GM's "two-mode" hybrid GMT900 trucks and SUVs, and is an all-aluminum design. It has a 10.8:1 compression ratio and produces 332 hp (248 kW) at 5100 rpm and 367 lb⋅ft (498 N⋅m) at 4100 rpm.

In 2008, this engine was selected by Wards as one of the 10 best engines in any regular production vehicle.

Applications:

- 2008–2009 Chevrolet Tahoe Hybrid
- 2008–2009 GMC Yukon Hybrid
- 2008–2009 Cadillac Escalade Hybrid
- 2008–2009 Chevrolet Silverado Hybrid
- 2008–2009 GMC Sierra Hybrid

===== LZ1 =====
The LZ1 is almost entirely based on its predecessor, the LFA, but with some revisions, such as including up-integrated electronic throttle control, long-life spark plugs, GM's Oil Life System, Active Fuel Management, and variable valve timing. It has the same compression ratio and power/torque ratings as its predecessor.

Applications:

- 2010–2013 Chevrolet Tahoe Hybrid
- 2010–2013 GMC Yukon Hybrid
- 2010–2013 Cadillac Escalade Hybrid
- 2010–2013 Chevrolet Silverado Hybrid
- 2010–2013 GMC Sierra Hybrid

=== 3.78 in. bore blocks (2005–2017) ===
This family of blocks is an updated version of its Generation III predecessor with Generation IV updates and capabilities. Applications of this family were mainly for trucks but did see some mild usage (with some modifications) in front-wheel-drive cars.

==== 4.8 L ====
===== LY2 =====
The Vortec 4800 LY2 (VIN code "C") is a Generation IV small-block V8 truck engine. Like its LR4 predecessor, it gets its displacement from a bore and stroke of 96 mm × 83 mm (3.78 in × 3.27 in). The smallest member of the Generation IV engine family is unique in that it is the only member used in trucks that does not feature variable valve timing; it also lacks Active Fuel Management. It has a cast-iron block. Power output is 260–295 hp (194–220 kW) and torque is 295–305 lb⋅ft (400–414 N⋅m).

Applications:

- 2008–2009 Chevrolet Express/GMC Savana 2500/3500
- 2007–2009 Chevrolet Silverado 1500
- 2007–2009 Chevrolet Tahoe
- 2007–2009 GMC Sierra 1500
- 2007–2009 GMC Yukon

===== L20 =====
The Vortec 4800 L20 makes more power and features variable valve timing. The system adjusts both intake and exhaust timing but does not come with Active Fuel Management. The L20 has a cast-iron block and power output is 260–302 hp (194–225 kW) while torque is 295–305 lb⋅ft (400–414 N⋅m). The Vortec 4800 base engines were dropped from the Chevrolet Tahoe and GMC Yukon in favor of the 5300 with Active Fuel Management.

Applications:

- 2010–2017 Chevrolet Express/GMC Savana 2500/3500
- 2010–2013 Chevrolet Silverado 1500
- 2010–2013 GMC Sierra 1500

==== 5.3 L ====
The Generation IV 5.3L engines share all the improvements and refinements found in other Generation IV engines. Eight versions of the Gen IV 5.3L engine were produced: three iron blocks (LY5, LMG, and LMF) and five aluminum blocks (LH6, LH8, LH9, LC9, and LS4). All versions featured Active Fuel Management except for the LH8, LH9, and LMF.

===== LH6 =====
The Vortec 5300 LH6 (VIN code "M") with Active Fuel Management replaced the LM4 for 2005, and was the first of the Generation IV small-block V8 truck engines to go into production. The LH6 produced 300 to 315 hp (224 to 235 kW) and 330 to 338 lb⋅ft (447 to 458 N⋅m). It is the aluminum block counterpart to the LY5.

Applications:

- 2005–2009 Chevrolet TrailBlazer including EXT (through 2006)
- 2005–2009 GMC Envoy Denali
- 2005–2006 GMC Envoy XL
- 2005 GMC Envoy XUV
- 2005–2007 Buick Rainier
- 2005–2009 Saab 9-7X
- 2005–2007 Isuzu Ascender
- 2007–2009 Chevrolet Silverado 1500
- 2007–2009 GMC Sierra 1500

===== LS4 =====
LS4 can also refer to a 454 cu in (7.4 L) Chevrolet Big-Block engine of the 1970s

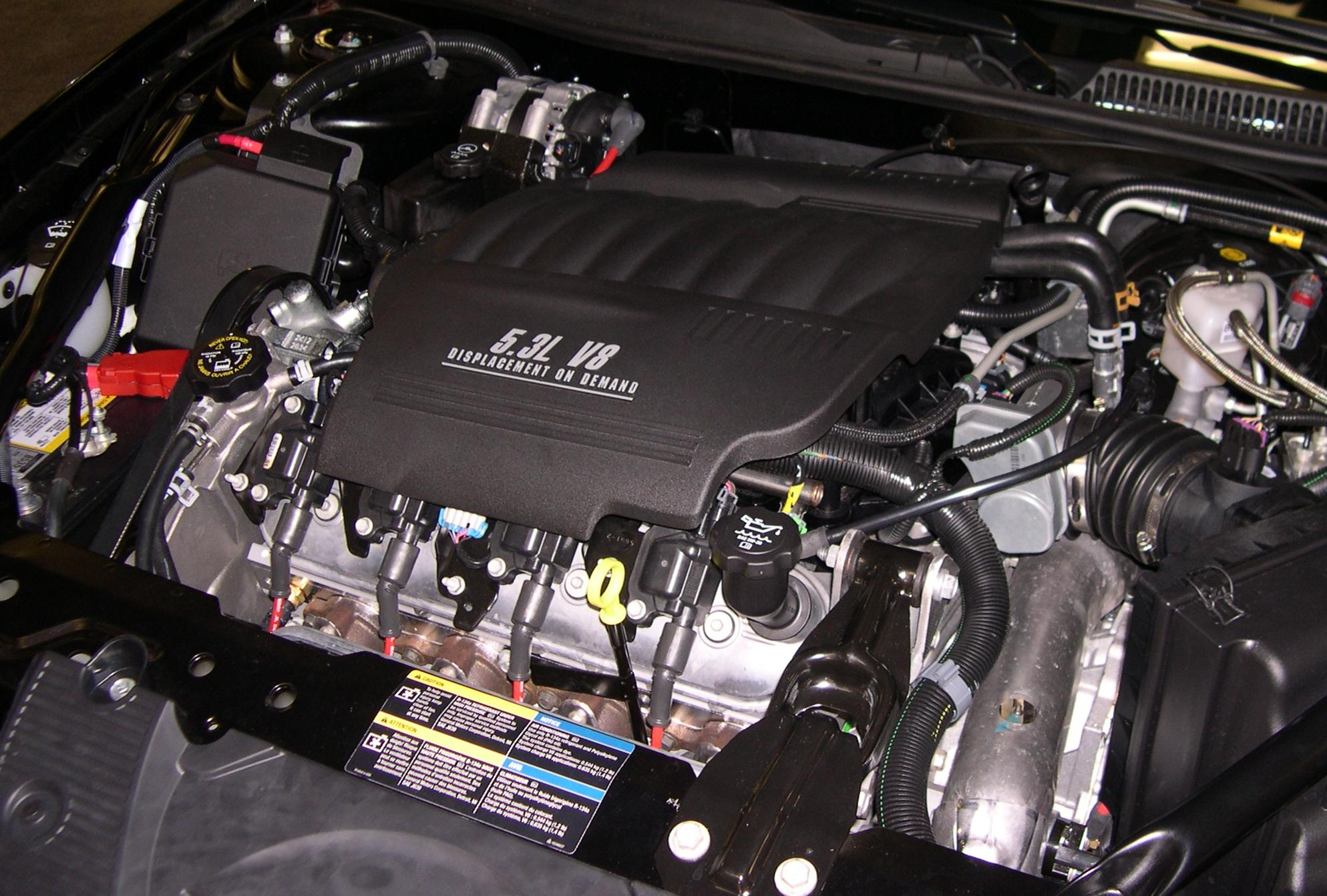
5.3 L LS4 V8 in a 2006 Chevrolet Impala SS

The LS4 is a 5.3 L (5,327 cc; 325.1 cu in) version of the Generation IV block. Though it has the same displacement as the Vortec 5300 LY5, it features an aluminum block instead of iron, and uses the same cylinder head casting as the Generation III LS6 engine. Compression ratio 10:1.

The LS4 is adapted for transverse front-wheel drive applications, with a bellhousing bolt pattern that differs from the rear-wheel-drive blocks (so as to mate with the 4T65E). Uses the GM Metric bellhousing bolt pattern.

According to GM, "the crankshaft is shortened 13–3 mm (0.51–0.12 in) at the flywheel end and 10 mm (0.39 in) at the accessory drive end – to reduce the length of the engine compared to the 6.0 L. All accessories are driven by a single serpentine belt to save space. The water pump is mounted remotely with an elongated pump manifold that connects it to the coolant passages. Revised oil pan baffles, or windage trays, are incorporated into the LS4 to ensure that the oil sump stays loaded during high-g cornering." Active Fuel Management is also used.

Output of this version is 303 hp (226 kW) (300 hp on LaCrosse Super) at 5600 rpm and 323 lb⋅ft (438 N⋅m) at 4400 rpm

Applications:

- 2005–2008 Pontiac Grand Prix GXP
- 2006–2009 Chevrolet Impala SS
- 2006–2007 Chevrolet Monte Carlo SS
- 2008–2009 Buick LaCrosse Super

===== LY5 =====
Introduced in 2007, the Vortec 5300 LY5 (VIN code "J") is the replacement for the LM7 Generation III engine. For SUV applications, it is rated at 320 hp (239 kW) and 340 lb⋅ft (461 N⋅m) of torque, while for pickup truck applications, it is rated at 315–320 hp (235–239 kW) at 5200 rpm and 335–340 lb⋅ft (454–461 N⋅m) at 4000 rpm.

Applications:

- 2007–2009 Chevrolet Avalanche
- 2007–2009 Chevrolet Silverado 1500
- 2007–2009 Chevrolet Suburban 1500
- 2007–2009 Chevrolet Tahoe
- 2007–2009 GMC Sierra 1500
- 2007–2009 GMC Yukon
- 2007–2009 GMC Yukon XL 1500

===== LC9 =====
The Vortec 5300 LC9 (VIN code "3" or "7") is the aluminum block flex-fuel version of the LH6, and is found in 4WD models. SUV applications are rated at 320 hp (239 kW) at 5400 rpm and 335 lb⋅ft (454 N⋅m) at 4000 rpm. Pickup truck applications are rated at 315 hp (235 kW) at 5300 rpm and 335 lb⋅ft (454 N⋅m) at 4000 rpm. Variable valve timing was added for the 2010 model year.

Applications:

- 2007–2013 Chevrolet Avalanche
- 2007–2013 Chevrolet Silverado 1500
- 2007–2014 Chevrolet Suburban 1/2 ton
- 2007–2013 GMC Sierra 1500
- 2007–2014 GMC Yukon XL 1/2 ton

===== LMG =====
The Vortec 5300 LMG (VIN code "0") is the flexible-fuel version of the LY5. Power and torque ratings for SUV and pickup truck applications are the same as each application's LY5 rating. Variable valve timing was added for the 2010 model year. Active Fuel Management is standard on this model for fuel economy purposes.

Applications:

- 2007–2013 Chevrolet Avalanche
- 2007–2013 Chevrolet Silverado 1500
- 2007–2014 Chevrolet Suburban 1500
- 2007–2014 Chevrolet Tahoe
- 2007–2013 GMC Sierra 1500
- 2007–2014 GMC Yukon
- 2007–2014 GMC Yukon XL 1500

===== LH8 =====
The LH8 was introduced in 2008 as the V8 option for the Hummer H3. It was the simplest, most basic 5.3L V8 of its family, lacking any special technologies. Also known as the Vortec 5300, the LH8 was available in the H3 and GM mid-size pickups through 2009.

The LH8 is a variant of the 5.3L Gen IV small-block V8 modified to fit in the engine bay of the GMT345 SUV and GMT355 trucks. It produces 300 hp (224 kW) at 5200 rpm and 320 lb⋅ft (434 N⋅m) at 4000 rpm. It has a displacement of 5.3 L (5,327 cc; 325.1 cu in) and a compression ratio of 9.9:1.

Applications:

- 2008–2009 Hummer H3 Alpha
- 2009 Chevrolet Colorado/GMC Canyon

===== LH9 =====
In 2010, the LH8 was replaced by the LH9. The LH9 was upgraded with Variable Valve Timing (VVT) and flex-fuel capability (but not Active Fuel Management). The Vortec 5300 LH9 produces 300 hp (224 kW) at 5200 rpm and 320 lb⋅ft (434 N⋅m) at 4000 rpm. It has a displacement of 5.3 L (5,327 cc; 325.1 cu in). The compression ratio was 9.9:1 for 2010, but was reduced to 9.7:1 for the remaining two years of production.

Applications:

- 2010 Hummer H3 Alpha
- 2010–2012 Chevrolet Colorado/GMC Canyon

===== LMF =====
Introduced in 2008, the LMF is a low-tech LY5, used in the lower-volume half-ton vans that still used the 4L60-E 4-speed automatic, lacking Active Fuel Management. The LMF features variable valve timing.

Applications:

- 2008–2014 Chevrolet Express 1500
- 2008–2014 GMC Savana 1500

=== 4.125 in. bore blocks (2006–2017) ===
Inspired by the LS1.R in size and performance goals, this family of blocks was designed for race-oriented performance. The only engine with this bore size that was used in a production vehicle is the LS7 with the LSX being only for aftermarket use. One unique feature of this family is that the cylinders are siamesed, no water passages between neighboring cylinders. This was done to increase both bore size and block strength.

==== 7.0 L ====
===== LS7 =====
LS7 can also refer to a 454 over-the-counter 460+ hp high compression Chevrolet Big-Block engine of the 1970s

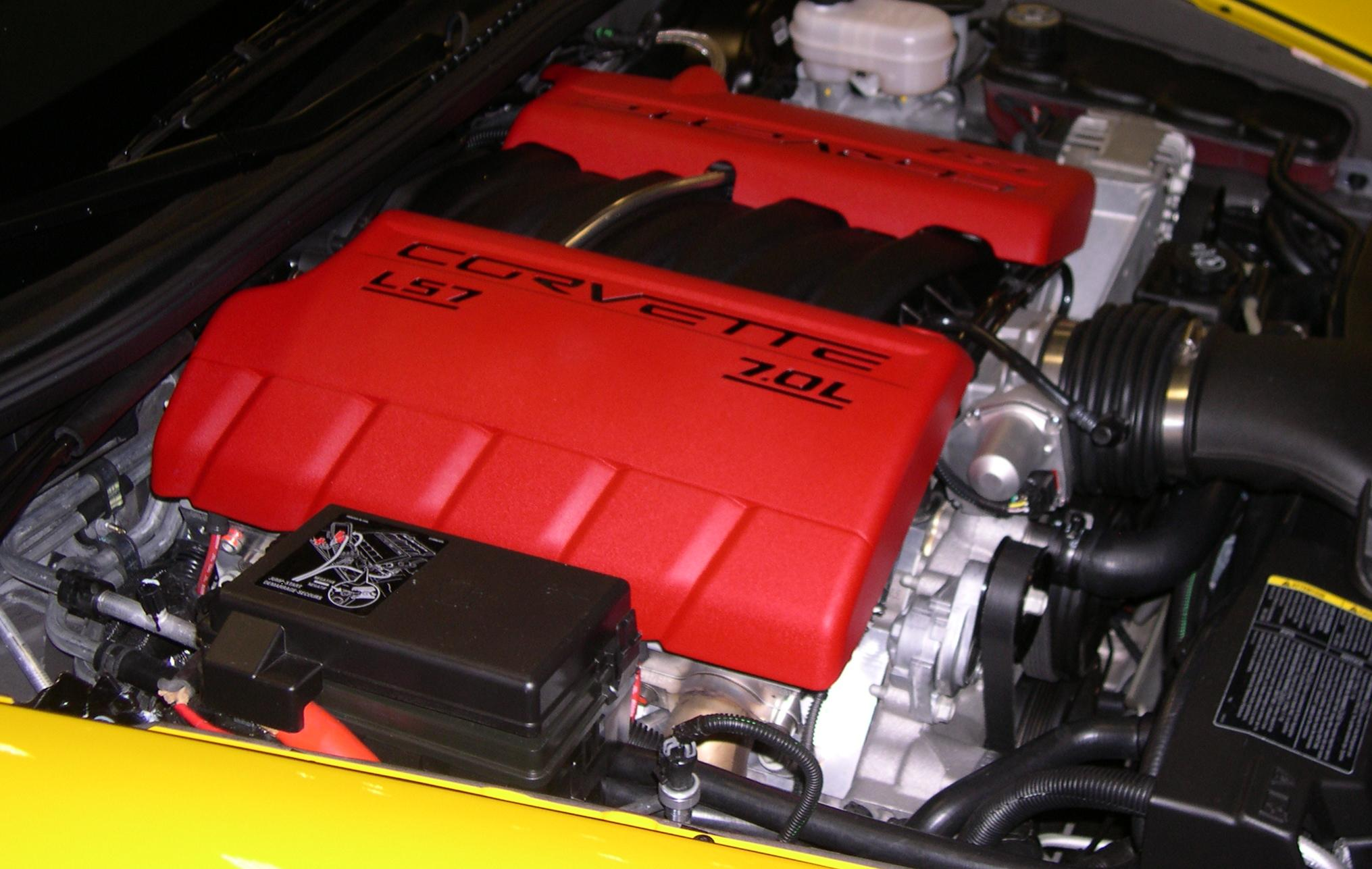
7.0L LS7 engine in a 2006 Chevrolet Corvette Z06

The LS7 is a 7.0 L (7,011 cc; 427.8 cu in) engine based on the Gen IV architecture. The block is changed, with sleeved cylinders in an aluminum block with a larger bore of 4.125 in (104.8 mm) and longer stroke of 4 in (101.6 mm) than the LS2. The small-block's 4.4 in (110 mm) bore spacing is retained, requiring pressed-in cylinder liners. The crankshaft and main bearing caps are forged steel for durability, the connecting rods are forged titanium, and the pistons are hypereutectic. The two-valve arrangement is retained, though the titanium intake valves by Del West have grown to 2.2 in (56 mm) and sodium-filled exhaust valves are up to 1.61 in (41 mm).

Peak output is 505 bhp (512 PS; 377 kW) at 6300 rpm (72.0 BHP/L) and 470 lb⋅ft (637 N⋅m) of torque at 4800 rpm with a 7000 rpm redline. During GM's reliability testing of this engine in its prototype phase, the LS7 was remarked to have been repeatedly tested to be 8000 rpm capable, although power was not recorded at that rpm level, because of the constraints of the camshaft's hydraulic lifters and the intake manifold ability to flow required air at that engine speed.

The LS7 was hand-built by the General Motors Performance Build Center in Wixom, Michigan. Most of these engines are installed in the Z06, some are also sold to individuals by GM as a crate engine. The 2014 and 2015 Z28 were the only Camaros to receive the 427 LS7. As of early 2022, the LS7 is no longer being supplied as a crate engine, with Chevrolet intending to fulfill all current orders until inventory is depleted.

After an extensive engineering process over several years, Holden Special Vehicles fitted the LS7 to a special edition model: the W427. The HSV-tuned engine produced 375 kW (510 PS; 503 bhp) at 6500 rpm and 640 N⋅m (472 lb⋅ft) at 5000 rpm of torque. It was unveiled at the Melbourne International Motor Show on February 29, 2008, and went on sale in August 2008. The first Australian car to be fitted with this engine, however, was the CSV GTS of 2007, which was claimed to have a power output of 400 kW (536 hp) and 600 N⋅m (443 lb⋅ft).

Applications:

- 2006–2013 Chevrolet Corvette Z06
- 2008–present Spada Codatronca
- 2008–2009 HSV W427
- 2009–2016 Zenvo ST1
- 2016 Ultima GTR
- 2013 Corvette 427 Convertible
- 2013 Mazzanti Evantra Millecavalli
- 2014–2015 Chevrolet Camaro Z/28
- 2014–present Arash AF8
- 2015 Exotic Rides W70
- 2015–present SIN R1 550
- 2015–present Ultima Evolution
- 2020–present Hennessey Venom F5
- Vertical Hummingbird 300LS

===== LS427 =====
The LS427 is a 7.0 L (7,011 cc; 427.8 cu in) engine based on the LS7 and introduced in June 2020. It was designed only as a crate engine to provide increased power and simplified installation for aftermarket and restomod applications. It did not appear in any production vehicles.

Unlike the LS7, the LS427 uses a conventional wet-sump oiling system with an F-body aluminum oil pan and wet-sump pump, eliminating the need for an external oil tank and plumbing required by the LS7's dry-sump system. This change makes the engine easier to install in a wider range of vehicles.

The LS427 is equipped with a unique hydraulic roller camshaft featuring .591 in intake and .590 in exhaust lift and longer duration (227° intake / 242° exhaust), resulting in a power increase to 570 bhp (578 PS; 425 kW) and 540 lb⋅ft (732 N⋅m) of torque.

Other changes include fifth-generation Camaro Z/28 exhaust manifolds and a 14 in manual transmission flywheel from the Z/28 platform, replacing the LS7’s stock components. It retains key LS7 features such as forged steel crankshaft, titanium connecting rods, CNC-ported aluminum cylinder heads with 70cc combustion chambers, and a 7000 rpm redline.

The engine is supplied fully assembled with intake manifold, fuel rails, injectors, throttle body, ignition coil packs, balancer, and water pump. It requires a specific LS427/570 engine controller (P/N 19420000) calibrated for this engine.

The LS427 was discontinued in January 2022 along with the LS7.

=== 4.065 in. bore blocks (2007–2017) ===
This family was designed as a replacement for the LS2 but enlarged to better accommodate variable valve timing and Active Fuel Management while still generating decent performance. This family of engines has mainly seen duty in performance cars and high-end SUVs.

==== 6.2 L ====
===== L92 / L9H / L94 =====
The L92, also known as the Vortec 6200, displaces 6.2 L (6,162 cc; 376.0 cu in), and debuted in the 2007 Cadillac Escalade. It is an all-aluminum design which, while still a pushrod engine, has variable valve timing. The system adjusts both intake and exhaust timing between two settings. This engine produces 403 hp (301 kW) and 417 lb⋅ft (565 N⋅m) in the GMC Yukon Denali/XL Denali, GMC Sierra Denali, Hummer H2, and briefly in the Chevrolet Tahoe LTZ (MY 2008.5 – MY 2009) and rated at 403 hp (301 kW) and 415 lb⋅ft (563 N⋅m). Starting in 2009, it was also available in the Chevrolet Silverado and GMC Sierra, as the L9H, with power ratings of 403 hp (301 kW) and 417 lb⋅ft (565 N⋅m).

Engines built prior to April 1, 2006, contained AFM hardware; however, the mode was not enabled in the PCM, and thus the system was not functional. Engines built after this date lacked any AFM hardware, and instead used a valley cover plate similar to the L20, until the debut of the L94 variants mentioned below.

The 2009 L92 was modified with flex-fuel capability, becoming the L9H, but still had no AFM hardware. In 2010, the L9H was further modified with Active Fuel Management, becoming the L94 (in the Cadillac Escalade and GMC Yukon Denali).

Applications:

- 2007–2013 Cadillac Escalade (L92 for MY 2007–2008, L9H for MY 2009, L94 for MY 2010–2013)
- 2008–2009 Chevrolet Tahoe LTZ (as RPO code L92)
- 2007–2013 GMC Yukon Denali / Yukon XL Denali (same as Cadillac Escalade)
- 2007–2013 GMC Sierra 1500 Denali
- 2008–2009 Hummer H2
- 2009–2013 Chevrolet Silverado 1500 (as RPO code L9H)
- 2009–2013 GMC Sierra 1500 (as RPO code L9H)

===== LS3 =====
LS3 can also refer to a 402 cu in (6.6 L) Chevrolet Big-Block engine of the 1970s.

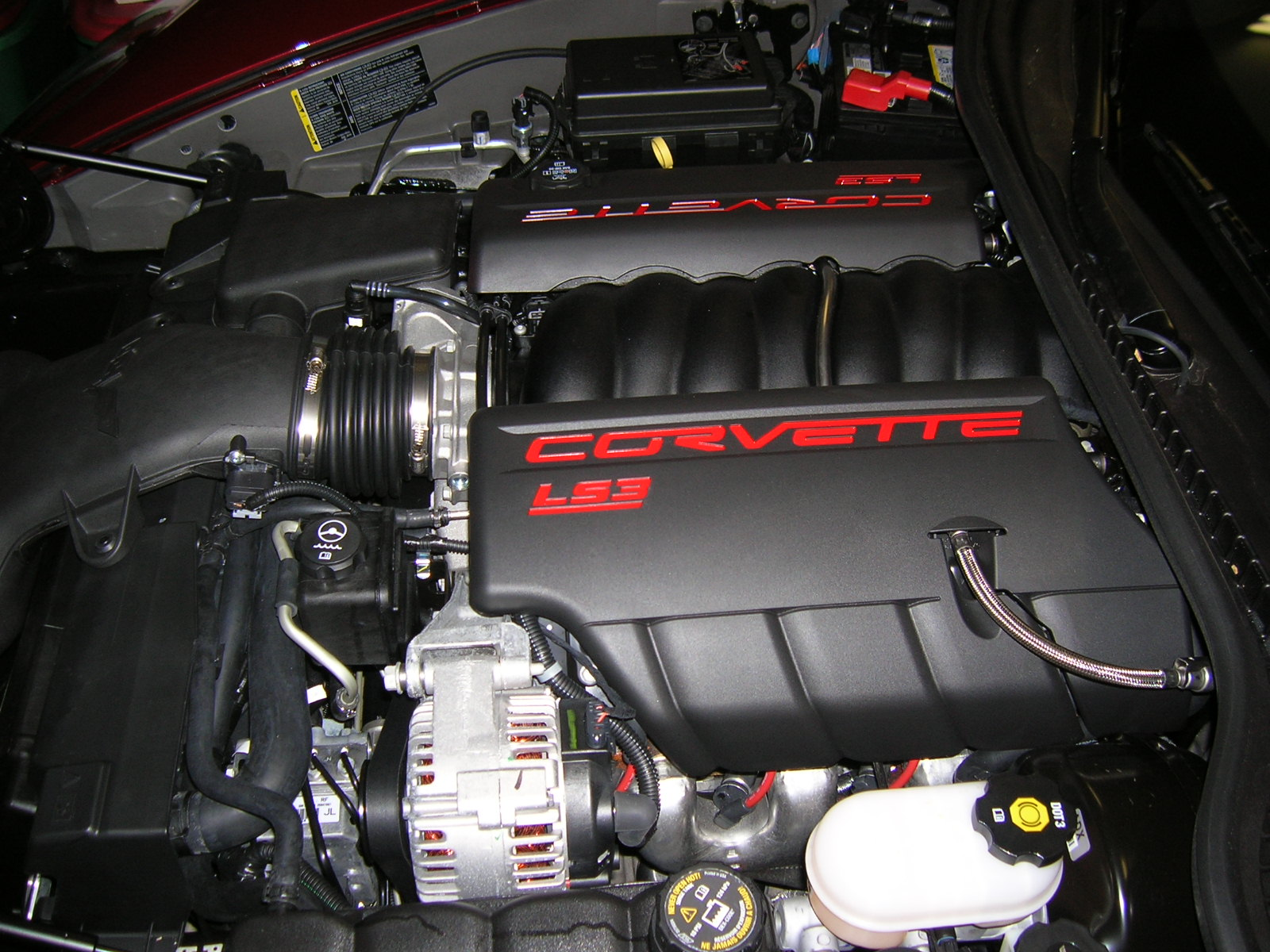
GM LS3 engine in a 2008 Chevrolet Corvette

The LS3 was introduced as the Corvette's new base engine for the 2008 model year. It produces 430 bhp (321 kW; 436 PS) at 5900 rpm and 424 lb⋅ft (575 N⋅m) at 4600 rpm without the optional Corvette exhaust and is SAE certified. The block is an updated version of the LS2 casting featuring a larger bore of 103.25 mm (4.065 in) creating a displacement of 6.2 L (6,162 cc; 376.0 cu in). It also features higher flowing cylinder heads sourced from the L92, a more aggressive camshaft with 0.551 in (14 mm) lift, a 10.7:1 compression ratio, a revised valvetrain with 0.236 in (6 mm) offset intake rocker arms, a high-flow intake manifold, and 47 lb (21 kg)/hour fuel injectors from the LS7 engine.

The L76/L92/LS3 cylinder heads use 2.165 in (55 mm) intake valves, and 1.59 in (40 mm) exhaust valves. Improved manufacturing efficiency makes these heads cheaper to produce than the outgoing LS6 heads, significantly undercutting the price of aftermarket heads. The large valves, however, limit maximum rpm – 6000 in the L76 (with AFM), and 6600 in the LS3 (with hollow stem valves).

In addition to the above, a dual-mode exhaust package with a bypass on acceleration was available on C6 Corvettes. The dual-mode exhaust uses vacuum-actuated outlet valves, which control engine noise during low-load operation, but open for maximum performance during high-load operation. The system is similar to the C6 Z06, but uses a 2.5 in (64 mm) diameter exhaust compared to the Z06's 3 in (76.2 mm). Power is boosted to 436 hp (325 kW) and 428 lb⋅ft (580 N⋅m) with this option. A similar system was optional on later-model fifth-generation Chevrolet Camaros and standard on the 2016–2017 Chevrolet SS, but no horsepower or torque increases were advertised on those vehicles.

LS3 engines found in manual transmission-equipped C6 Corvette Grand Sport models also received a dry sump oiling system similar to the one fitted to LS7-equipped Corvettes.

From April 2008, Australian performance car manufacturer HSV adopted the LS3 as its standard V8 throughout the range, replacing the 6.0-liter LS2. The LS3 received modifications for its application to HSV E Series models, producing 425 bhp (317 kW). The LS3 engine in the E Series II GTS (released September 2009) was upgraded to produce 436 bhp (325 kW). All HSV MY12.5 excluding the base Maloo and Clubsport variants have been upgraded to produce 436 bhp (325 kW).

From September 2015, Holden introduced the LS3 in all V8 models of the VF II Commodore and WN II Caprice-V, replacing the 6.0L L77.

Applications:

- 2008–2013 Chevrolet Corvette
- 2010–2015 Chevrolet Camaro SS (manual only)
- 2008–2017 Holden vehicles including:
  - 2008–2013 HSV E Series
  - 2009 Pontiac G8 GXP
  - 2014–2017 Chevrolet SS
  - 2009–2017 Vauxhall VXR8
  - 2015–2017 Holden WN II Caprice
  - 2015–2017 Holden VF II Commodore
- 2012 AC 378 GT Zagato
- 2015 SIN R1 450
- 2016 Arrinera Hussarya 33
- 2019 Bolwell Nagari 500

===== L99 =====
The L99 is derived from the LS3 with reduced output but adds Active Fuel Management (formerly called Displacement on Demand) and variable valve timing, which allows it to run on only four cylinders during light load conditions.

Applications:

- 2010–2015 Chevrolet Camaro SS (automatic transmission)

===== LS9 =====
The Gen IV LS9 is a supercharged 6.2 L (6,162 cc; 376.0 cu in) engine, based on the LS3; the LS7 block was not used because of the higher cylinder pressures created by the supercharger requiring the thicker cylinder walls of the LS3. It has a bore and stroke of 103.25 mm × 92 mm (4.065 in × 3.622 in). It is equipped with an Eaton four-lobe Roots type supercharger and has a compression ratio of 9.1:1. Power output is rated 638 bhp (647 PS; 476 kW) at 6500 rpm and 604 lb⋅ft (819 N⋅m) at 3800 rpm of torque. GM previously used the LS9 RPO code on 1969 and later Chevrolet trucks (both 2WD and 4WD) including Blazers, Jimmys, and Suburbans, as well as car carriers. The original LS9 was a 350 cu in (5.7 L) V8, developing 160 hp (119 kW) and 245 lb⋅ft (332 N⋅m) of torque. In 2017, Holden Special Vehicles used a modified version of the LS9 in their GTSR W1, the last-ever Holden Commodore based vehicle produced in Australia.

Applications:

- 2009–2013 Chevrolet Corvette ZR1
- 2009 Savage Rivale Roadyacht GTS
- 2010 HTT Pléthore LC 750
- 2015 Equus Bass 770
- 2015–present SIN R1 650
- 2016 Icona Vulcano Titanium
- 2016 VLF Destino
- 2017 HSV GTSR W1

===== LSA =====
The supercharged 6.2L LSA is similar to the LS9 and debuted in the 2009 CTS-V. The LSA has been SAE certified at 556 bhp (415 kW) at 6100 rpm and 551 lb⋅ft (747 N⋅m) at 3800 rpm. GM labeled it "the most powerful ever offered in Cadillac's nearly 106-year history." The LSA features a smaller 1.9 L (120 cu in) supercharger rather than the 2.3 L (140 cu in) variant of the LS9. Other differences include a slightly lower 9.0:1 compression ratio, single-unit heat exchanger, and cast pistons.

A 580 bhp (433 kW) and 556 lb⋅ft (754 N⋅m) version of the LSA engine is used in the 2012 Camaro ZL1. On May 15, 2013, Holden Special Vehicles announced that this version of the LSA engine would also be used in the GEN-F GTS.

Applications:

- 2009–2015 Cadillac CTS-V
- 2012–2015 Chevrolet Camaro ZL1
- 2014–2017 HSV GTS GEN-F
  - 2013–2017 Vauxhall VXR8 GTS, GTS-R

== Generation V (2013–present) ==
Generation V
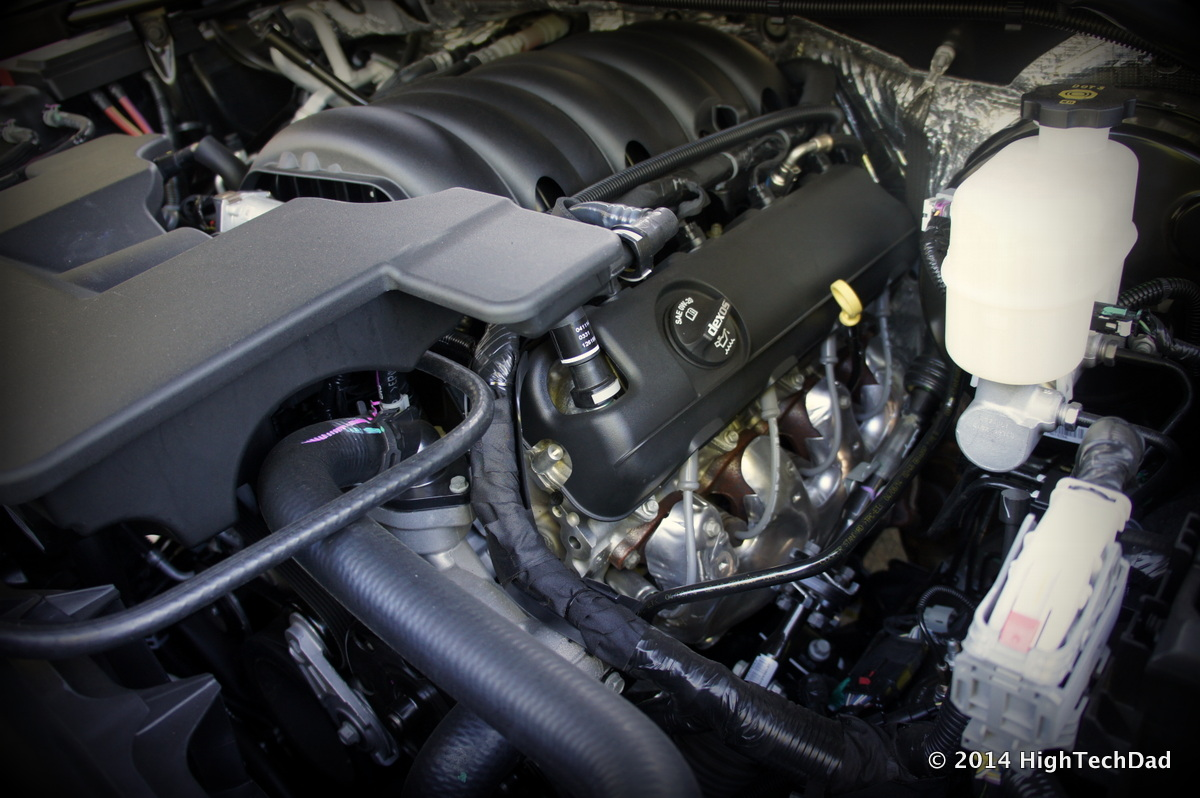
- The L86 in the 2015 GMC Yukon Denali

Overview
- Manufacturer: General Motors
- Also called: EcoTec3
- Production: 2013–present

Layout
- Configuration: 90° V6; 90° V8
- Displacement: 4,301 cc (262.5 cu in); 5,328 cc (325.1 cu in); 6,162 cc (376.0 cu in); 6,564 cc (400.6 cu in)
- Cylinder bore: 99.6 mm (3.92 in) - V6 only; 96 mm (3.78 in); 103.25 mm (4.065 in)
- Piston stroke: 92 mm (3.622 in); 98 mm (3.858 in) (L8T and L8P)
- Cylinder block material: Aluminum; Cast iron (L8T and L8P)
- Cylinder head material: Aluminum
- Valvetrain: OHV 2 valves per cylinder
- Compression ratio: 10.0:1; 10.8:1; 11.0:1; 11.5:1

Combustion
- Supercharger: Eaton TVS supercharger (LT4 & LT5)
- Fuel system: Direct injection
- Fuel type: Gasoline; E85
- Oil system: Wet sump Dry sump
- Cooling system: Water-cooled

Chronology
- Predecessor: Generation IV

In 2007, WardsAuto.com reported that the LS3 (used in the 2008 Chevrolet Corvette) and Vortec 6000 LFA (used in the 2008 Chevrolet Tahoe Hybrid) engines would be the final two designs in the Generation IV small-block engine family, and the future designs would be part of the Generation V engine family. An experimental engine was built based on the L92 engine from the Cadillac Escalade, GMC Yukon Denali, and Hummer H2, and reported to generate 450 bhp (336 kW) on gasoline via direct fuel injection, increased compression ratio to 11.5:1, and a modified engine controller. The first Gen V LT engine was the LT1, announced in 2012 as the initial powerplant for the redesigned Corvette C7, succeeding the LS engine family. The new logo formally adopts the Small Block name for the engines.

The fifth generation of the iconic GM small block engine family features the same cam-in-block architecture and 4.4 in (110 mm) bore centers (the distance between the centers of each cylinder) that were born with the original small block in 1954. Structurally, the Gen-V small-block is similar to the Gen III/IV engines, including a deep-skirt cylinder block. Refinements and new or revised components are used throughout, including a revised cooling system and all-new cylinder heads. Because the positions of the intake and exhaust valves are flipped from where they would be in an LS engine, as well as the need for an addition to the camshaft to drive the high-pressure fuel pump for the direct fuel injection, few parts are interchangeable with the Gen III/IV engines.

All Gen V engines use aluminum cylinder heads, direct injection, piston cooling jets, and continuously variable valve timing. However, they all retain their ancestors' two-valve pushrod valvetrain and 4.4 in (111.76 mm) bore spacing.

=== 4.065 in. bore blocks (2014–present) ===
This family of blocks was the first of the Generation V small block with the LT1 being the progenitor of this family and generation. This family of blocks has seen a wide range of applications from performance vehicles to truck usage.

==== 6.2 L ====
===== LT1 =====
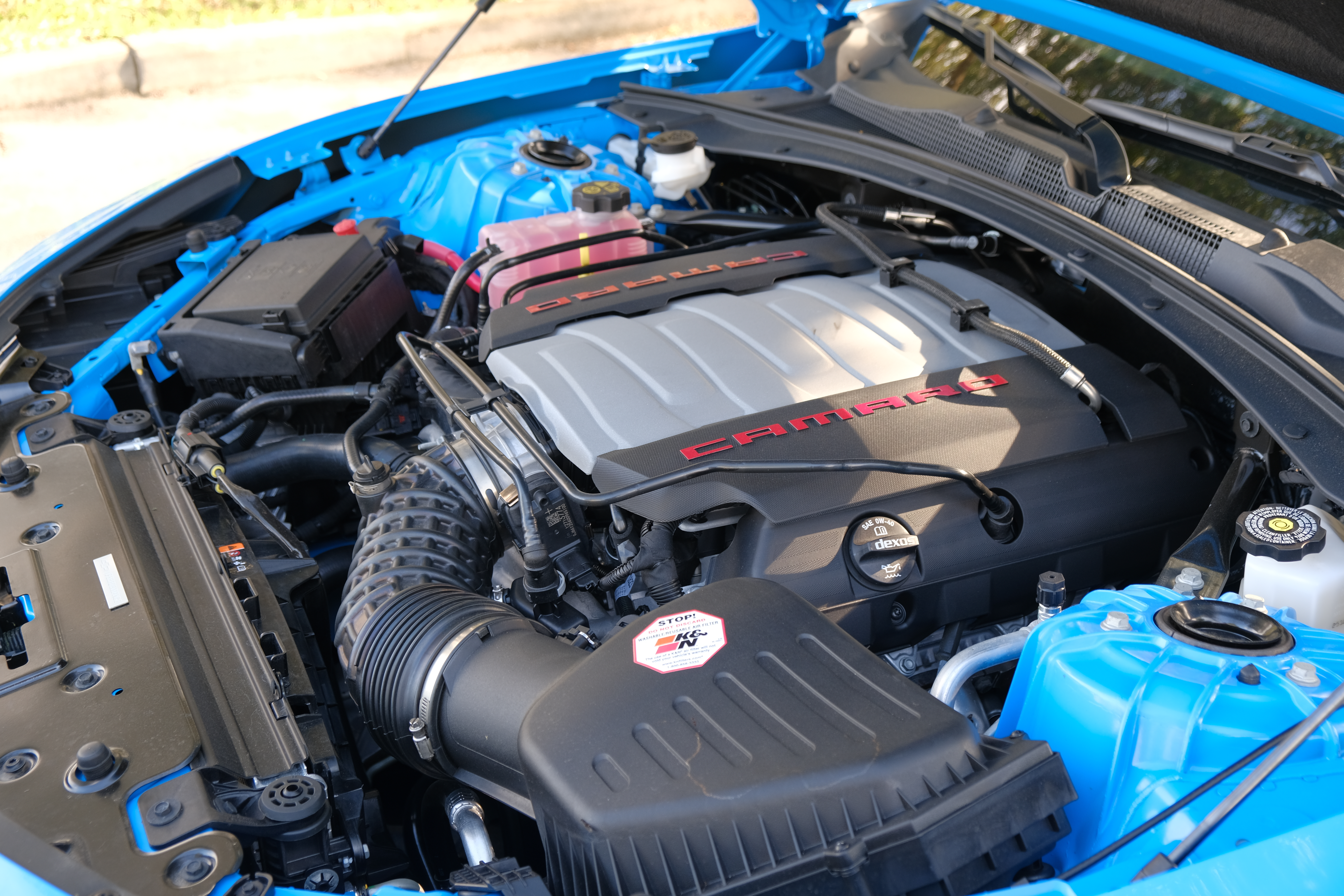
The 6.2L LT1 engine in a 2022 Chevrolet Camaro LT1

The 6.2 L (6,162 cc; 376.0 cu in) LT1 engine debuted in the 2014 Chevrolet Corvette Stingray and is the first Generation V small block engine. Like its LS3 predecessor, it gets its displacement from a bore and stroke of 103.25 mm × 92 mm (4.065 in × 3.622 in) with a compression ratio of 11.5 to 1.

Applications:

| Year(s) | Model | Power | Torque |
|---|---|---|---|
| 2014–2019 | Chevrolet Corvette C7 | 455 hp (339 kW) at 6000 rpm | 460 lb⋅ft (624 N⋅m) at 4600 rpm |
| 2014–2019 | Chevrolet Corvette C7 | 460 hp (343 kW) at 6000 rpm (performance exhaust) | 465 lb⋅ft (630 N⋅m) at 4600 rpm (performance exhaust) |
| 2016–2024 | Chevrolet Camaro SS | 455 hp (339 kW) at 6000 rpm | 455 lb⋅ft (617 N⋅m) at 4400 rpm |
| 2020–2024 | Chevrolet Camaro LT1 | 455 hp (339 kW) at 6000 rpm | 455 lb⋅ft (617 N⋅m) at 4400 rpm |

===== LT2 =====
The LT2 engine debuted in the 2020 Corvette Stingray as the successor to the LT1. It was designed specifically with mid-engine placement and dry-sump lubrication in mind.

Applications:

| Year(s) | Model | Power | Torque |
|---|---|---|---|
| 2020–2026 | Chevrolet Corvette C8 | 490 hp (365 kW) at 6450 rpm | 465 lb⋅ft (630 N⋅m) at 5150 rpm |
| 2020–2026 | Chevrolet Corvette C8 | 495 hp (369 kW) at 6450 rpm (performance exhaust) | 470 lb⋅ft (637 N⋅m) at 5150 rpm (performance exhaust) |

===== L86/L87 =====
The 6.2 L (6,162 cc; 376.0 cu in) EcoTec3 is a Generation V small-block V8 truck engine (VIN code "J"). The L86 is an LT1 engine modified for truck use with a compression ratio of 11.5 to 1. In 2019, GM introduced the L87 as the successor to the L86. Power and torque remain the same, but whereas the L86's Active Fuel Management system alternates between V4 and V8 modes, the L87's Dynamic Fuel Management system can alternate between any of 17 different firing orders which vary both how many and which cylinders are actually firing based on demand calculated every 125 milliseconds.

Applications:

| Year(s) | Model | Power | Torque |
|---|---|---|---|
| 2014–present | Chevrolet Silverado/GMC Sierra | 420 hp (313 kW) at 5600 rpm 433 hp (323 kW) at 5600 rpm (Tahoe RST Performance Edition) | 460 lb⋅ft (624 N⋅m) at 4100 rpm 467 lb⋅ft (633 N⋅m) at 4100 rpm (Tahoe RST Performance Edition) |
| 2015–present | Chevrolet Tahoe/GMC Yukon | 420 hp (313 kW) at 5600 rpm 433 hp (323 kW) at 5600 rpm (Tahoe RST Performance Edition) | 460 lb⋅ft (624 N⋅m) at 4100 rpm 467 lb⋅ft (633 N⋅m) at 4100 rpm (Tahoe RST Performance Edition) |
| 2015–present | Chevrolet Suburban/GMC Yukon XL | 420 hp (313 kW) at 5600 rpm 433 hp (323 kW) at 5600 rpm (Tahoe RST Performance Edition) | 460 lb⋅ft (624 N⋅m) at 4100 rpm 467 lb⋅ft (633 N⋅m) at 4100 rpm (Tahoe RST Performance Edition) |
| 2015–present | Cadillac Escalade/Escalade ESV | 420 hp (313 kW) at 5600 rpm 433 hp (323 kW) at 5600 rpm (Tahoe RST Performance Edition) | 460 lb⋅ft (624 N⋅m) at 4100 rpm 467 lb⋅ft (633 N⋅m) at 4100 rpm (Tahoe RST Performance Edition) |

===== LT4 =====
The 6.2 L (6,162 cc; 376.0 cu in) LT4 engine builds on the design strengths of the previous LS9 supercharged engine used in the sixth-generation Corvette ZR1 and leverages the technologies introduced on the seventh-generation Corvette Stingray, including direct injection, cylinder deactivation, and continuously variable valve timing, to take Corvette performance to an all-new level. The LT4 engine is based on the same Gen 5 small block foundation as the Corvette Stingray's LT1 6.2L naturally aspirated engine, incorporating several unique features designed to support its higher output and the greater cylinder pressures created by forced induction, including: Rotocast A356T6 aluminum cylinder heads that are stronger and handle heat better than conventional aluminum heads, lightweight titanium intake valves, forged powder metal steel connecting rods, 10.0:1 compression ratio, enhanced performance and efficiency enabled by direct injection, forged aluminum pistons with unique, stronger structure to ensure strength under high cylinder pressures, stainless steel exhaust manifolds for structure at higher temperatures, aluminum balancer for reduced mass, and standard dry-sump oiling system with a dual-pressure-control oil pump. The engine uses a 1.7 L (103.7 cu in) Eaton TVS Supercharger. Although smaller than the previous 2.3 L (140.4 cu in) supercharger used on the sixth-generation ZR1, it spins to 5000 rpm faster thus generating boost quicker while making only slightly less total boost than the LS9 engine. The Escalade-V variant uses a 2.7 L (164.8 cu in) Eaton TVS supercharger. This engine is also used by Scuderia Cameron Glickenhaus for their SCG 004S. The limited production IsoRivolta GTZ, which is based on the C7 Z06, also uses the LT4 engine.

Applications:

| Year(s) | Model | Power | Torque |
|---|---|---|---|
| 2015–2019 | Chevrolet Corvette Z06 | 650 hp (485 kW) at 6400 rpm | 650 lb⋅ft (881 N⋅m) at 3600 rpm |
| 2016–2019 | Cadillac CTS-V | 640 hp (477 kW) at 6400 rpm | 630 lb⋅ft (854 N⋅m) at 3600 rpm |
| 2016–present | Arash AF10 Hybrid | 900 hp (671 kW) | 885 lb⋅ft (1,200 N⋅m) |
| 2017–2024 | Chevrolet Camaro ZL1 | 650 hp (485 kW) at 6400 rpm | 650 lb⋅ft (881 N⋅m) at 3600 rpm |
| 2022–present | Cadillac CT5-V Blackwing | 668 hp (498 kW) | 659 lb⋅ft (893 N⋅m) |
| 2023–present | Cadillac Escalade-V | 682 hp (509 kW) | 653 lb⋅ft (885 N⋅m) |

===== LT5 =====
The 6.2 L (6,162 cc; 376.0 cu in) LT5 engine debuted in the seventh-generation Corvette ZR1 at the 2017 Dubai Motor Show. It draws its name from the 5.7 L LT5 from the C4, manufactured from 1989–1993. The original LT5 is rarely known as a Chevy small block V8, as it was designed by Lotus, built by Mercury Marine, and implements a DOHC 32-valve multi-port injection system, instead of the 16-valve push-rod design. The new (and unrelated) LT5, however, has increased its displacement from 5.7 to 6.2L (350 to 376 cu in), retains the Gen V OHV valvetrain, and is topped with a 2.6 L (158.7 cu in) Eaton TVS supercharger and an improved intercooler. It simultaneously couples the standard direct injection system found on Gen 5 engines with port fuel injection, specifically to satisfy upper-RPM fuel demands. Power output is 755 hp (765 PS; 563 kW) at 6400 rpm and 715 lb⋅ft (969 N⋅m) of torque at 3600 rpm.

Applications:

| Year(s) | Model | Power | Torque |
|---|---|---|---|
| 2019 | Chevrolet Corvette ZR1 | 755 hp (563 kW) at 6400 rpm | 715 lb⋅ft (969 N⋅m) at 3600 rpm |

==== 6.6 L ====
===== L8T/L8P/L8S =====
The L8T is the first iron block member of the Gen V family, and is the successor to the 6.0L Gen IV L96. It shares its 4.065 in (103.25 mm) bore with other 6.2L V8s such as the L86, but with a longer stroke of 3.858 in (98.0 mm) to displace 6,564 cc (400.6 cu in). It is rated for 401 hp (299 kW) at 5,200 rpm and 464 lb⋅ft (629 N⋅m) of torque at 4,000 rpm. The compression ratio is 10.8:1. The longer stroke yields little additional peak torque output compared to the L86, but the engine only requires 87 octane. The stroke is also shorter than the LS7's 4.0 in (101.6 mm) to optimize the rod ratio for reliability.

The L8T was developed specifically for maximum reliability under load in heavy-duty truck applications. Its design features an iron block, increased displacement through a longer stroke, a lower compression ratio, forged connecting rods, and a forged crankshaft with central counterweights. It also omits stop-start and cylinder-deactivation systems.

The L8T has also been used in the gas versions of the Chevrolet Low Cab Forward medium-duty truck since the 2021 model year. This version is rated for 350 hp (260 kW) at 4,500 rpm and 425 lb⋅ft (576 N⋅m) of torque at 3,800 rpm.

The L8T is also offered as a crate engine with the regular Silverado HD power ratings, being marketed as the largest-displacement Gen V small block available in the Chevrolet Performance catalog.

The L8P is a Chevrolet Performance crate engine released in 2024 based on the L8T, but with valvetrain upgrades. It uses a camshaft with 0.549" lift and 218° intake/231° exhaust duration derived from the LT2, hollow-stem intake valves, and sodium-filled exhaust valves. With the same 6,564 cc (400.6 cu in) displacement and 10.8:1 compression ratio as the L8T, the L8P is rated at 523 hp (390 kW) at 5,800 rpm and 543 lb⋅ft (736 N⋅m) of torque at 4,600 rpm on premium pump gasoline.

In 2026, for the 2027 Silverado and Sierra HD, GM updated the L8T with the L8S RPO code, now producing 412 hp (307 kW) and 472 lb⋅ft (640 N⋅m). Auxiliary updates for the L8S include a new "Turbo-Jet" intake manifold, an engine-mounted oil cooler, revised emissions equipment, and a digital oil meter. The displacement remains at 6.6L and few other mechanical changes are confirmed as of September 2026.

Applications:

| Year(s) | Model | Power | Torque | AKI octane requirement |
L8T
| 2020–2026 | Chevrolet Silverado HD/GMC Sierra HD | 401 hp (299 kW) at 5200 rpm | 464 lb⋅ft (629 N⋅m) at 4000 rpm | Regular (87) |
| 2021–present | Chevrolet Express/GMC Savana 2500/3500/4500 | 401 hp (299 kW) at 5200 rpm | 464 lb⋅ft (629 N⋅m) at 4000 rpm | Regular (87) |
| 2021–present | Chevrolet Low Cab Forward 3500 HG/4500 HG/5500 HG/5500 XG | 350 hp (261 kW) at 4500 rpm | 425 lb⋅ft (576 N⋅m) at 3800 rpm | Regular (87) |
| 2023–present | Crate engine | 401 hp (299 kW) at 5200 rpm | 464 lb⋅ft (629 N⋅m) at 4000 rpm | Regular (87) |
L8P
| 2024–present | Crate engine | 523 hp (390 kW) at 5800 rpm | 543 lb⋅ft (736 N⋅m) at 4600 rpm | Premium (91/93) |
L8S
| 2027–present | Chevrolet Silverado HD/GMC Sierra HD | 412 hp (307 kW) | 472 lb⋅ft (640 N⋅m) | Regular (87) |

===== L8E =====
For the 2027 Chevrolet Performance Parts crate engine catalog, GM is expected to introduce a supercharged, iron-block 6.6L crate engine with the RPO code L8E. It combines the cast-iron, deep-skirt block used in the L8T, L8P, and L8S with the compact 1.7L Eaton TVS supercharger from the LT4. The redline is increased from 5,600 rpm in the L8T and 6,000 rpm in the L8P to 6,600 rpm, which is the same as the 6.2L LS3, LT1, and LT4 and the 6.7L Gen VI LS6.

Preliminary specs include:

- Forged aluminum pistons
- 10.0:1 compression ratio
- 189°/223° intake/exhaust duration
- 0.492 in (12.50 mm)/0.551 in (14.00 mm) intake/exhaust lift
- 2.130 in (54.10 mm) hollow intake valves
- 1.590 in (40.39 mm) sodium-filled exhaust valves
- Most other components are shared with naturally aspirated 6.6L engines, including the forged steel crankshaft and rods and the Gen V aluminum direct-injection heads.

=== 3.78 in. bore blocks (2014–present) ===
Unlike the previous Generation III/IV 3.78 in (96 mm) bore block families, there is no 4.8 L (290 cu in) displacement variant (having been 'replaced' by GM's 5th Generation LT V8-based V6, the 4.3 L (260 cu in) LV3).

==== 5.3 L ====
===== L83 =====
Dubbed EcoTec3, the 5.3 L (5,327 cc; 325.1 cu in) is a Generation V small block V8 truck engine (VIN code "C"). Like its Vortec 5300 Generation IV predecessor, it gets its displacement from a bore and stroke of 96 mm × 92 mm (3.78 in × 3.62 in) with a compression ratio of 11.0:1.

Applications:

| Year(s) | Model | Power | Torque |
|---|---|---|---|
| 2014–2019 | Chevrolet Silverado/GMC Sierra 1500 | 355 hp (265 kW) at 5600 rpm | 383 lb⋅ft (519 N⋅m) at 4100 rpm |
| 2014–2019 | Chevrolet Silverado/GMC Sierra 1500 | 376 hp (280 kW) at 5600 rpm E85 | 416 lb⋅ft (564 N⋅m) at 4000 rpm E85 |
| 2015–2020 | Chevrolet Tahoe/GMC Yukon | 355 hp (265 kW) at 5600 rpm | 383 lb⋅ft (519 N⋅m) at 4100 rpm |
| 2015–2020 | Chevrolet Tahoe/GMC Yukon | 376 hp (280 kW) at 5600 rpm E85 | 416 lb⋅ft (564 N⋅m) at 4000 rpm E85 |
| 2015–2020 | Chevrolet Suburban/GMC Yukon XL | 355 hp (265 kW) at 5600 rpm | 383 lb⋅ft (519 N⋅m) at 4100 rpm |
| 2015–2020 | Chevrolet Suburban/GMC Yukon XL | 376 hp (280 kW) at 5600 rpm E85 | 416 lb⋅ft (564 N⋅m) at 4000 rpm E85 |

===== L8B =====
The L8B is an eAssist mild hybrid version of the L83 featuring a 0.45-kWh lithium ion battery pack. This setup can improve fuel efficiency by about 13%. This adds about 100 lb (45 kg) to the total weight of the truck but provides an additional 13 hp (10 kW) and 44 lb⋅ft (60 N⋅m).

Applications:

| Year(s) | Model | Power | Torque |
|---|---|---|---|
| 2016–2018 | Chevrolet Silverado/GMC Sierra 1500 Hybrid | 355 hp (265 kW) at 5600 rpm | 383 lb⋅ft (519 N⋅m) at 4100 rpm |

===== L82/L84 =====
The L82 is one of two 5.3L V8s available in the fourth-generation Chevrolet Silverado and fifth-generation GMC Sierra. The L82 uses Active Fuel Management instead of the L84's Dynamic Fuel Management system and is only available on lower-trim trucks. The L84 is one of two 5.3L V8s available in the 4th generation Chevrolet Silverado and GMC Sierra. The L84 is distinguished from the L82 by the presence of the Dynamic Fuel Management System and is either available or standard on mid-to-high-level trims. The L84 is also the base engine on the 2021–present Chevrolet Tahoe, GMC Yukon, Chevrolet Suburban, and GMC Yukon XL.

Applications:

| Year(s) | Model | Power | Torque |
L82
| 2019–2021 | Chevrolet Silverado/GMC Sierra | 355 hp (265 kW) at 5600 rpm | 383 lb⋅ft (519 N⋅m) at 4100 rpm |
L84
| 2019–present | Chevrolet Silverado/GMC Sierra 1500 | 355 hp (265 kW) at 5600 rpm | 383 lb⋅ft (519 N⋅m) at 4100 rpm |
| 2021–present | Chevrolet Tahoe/GMC Yukon | 355 hp (265 kW) at 5600 rpm | 383 lb⋅ft (519 N⋅m) at 4100 rpm |
| 2021–present | Chevrolet Suburban/GMC Yukon XL | 355 hp (265 kW) at 5600 rpm | 383 lb⋅ft (519 N⋅m) at 4100 rpm |

=== 3.921 in. bore blocks (2014–present) ===
These V6 engines are based on the V8 version of the Gen V family, but with two fewer cylinders – a design lineage that dates back to the previous 4.3L V6, which was itself a Gen I small block with a pair of cylinders removed.

There were no V6 engines based on Generation II, III, or IV small-block V8s.

==== 4.3 L ====
Dubbed EcoTec3, the 4.3 L (260 cu in) is a Generation V small block V6 truck engine. It gets its displacement from bore and stroke of 99.6 mm × 92 mm (3.921 in × 3.622 in) with a compression ratio of 11.0 to 1. Firing order is 1-6-5-4-3-2.

This engine replaces the unrelated 4.3L V6 whose lineage dates back to 1978.

===== LV3 =====
Applications:

| Year(s) | Model | Power | Torque |
|---|---|---|---|
| 2014–2021 | Chevrolet Silverado/GMC Sierra 1500 | 285 hp (213 kW) at 5300 rpm | 305 lb⋅ft (414 N⋅m) at 3900 rpm |
| 2014–2021 | Chevrolet Silverado/GMC Sierra 1500 | 297 hp (221 kW) at 5300 rpm E85 | 330 lb⋅ft (447 N⋅m) at 3900 rpm E85 |

===== LV1 =====
The engine is essentially the same as the LV3, but without Active Fuel Management technology. The LV1 made its debut in the 2018 model year GM full-size vans—the 2018 Chevrolet Express and 2018 GMC Savana—as the successor to the Gen IV 4.8L L20.

Applications:

| Year(s) | Model | Power | Torque |
|---|---|---|---|
| 2018–present | Chevrolet Express/GMC Savana 2500/3500 | 265 hp (198 kW) at 5200 rpm | 295 lb⋅ft (400 N⋅m) at 4000 rpm |

== Generation VI (2027–present) ==
Generation VI

Overview
- Manufacturer: General Motors
- Production: 2027–present

Layout
- Configuration: 90° V8
- Displacement: 5,675 cc (346.3 cu in); 6,564 cc (400.6 cu in); 6,698 cc (408.7 cu in)
- Cylinder bore: 96 mm (3.780 in); 103.25 mm (4.065 in)
- Piston stroke: 98 mm (3.858 in); 100 mm (3.937 in)
- Cylinder block material: Aluminum
- Cylinder head material: Aluminum
- Valvetrain: OHV 2 valves per cylinder
- Compression ratio: 13.0:1

Combustion
- Fuel system: Combined port injection + direct injection
- Fuel type: Gasoline; E85
- Oil system: Wet sump Dry sump (LS6)
- Cooling system: Water-cooled

Output
- Power output: 402–535 hp (300–399 kW)
- Torque output: 428–520 lb⋅ft (580–705 N⋅m)

Chronology
- Predecessor: Generation V

General Motors announced in January 2023 that plans for a sixth generation of small-block were in place, with the company investing $854 million into its various manufacturing plants. The 2027 Chevrolet Corvette Grand Sport and Grand Sport X received the first Generation VI engines, replacing the Generation V LT2. The upcoming fifth-generation Chevrolet Silverado (and its GMC Sierra sibling) would later receive them for the 2027 model year, in two new displacements: 5.7 and 6.6 liters.

General Motors has announced that the sixth-generation V8 small-block will be produced in Flint, MI, and Tonawanda, NY.

=== 4.065 in. bore blocks (2027–present) ===
==== LS6 ====
The LS6 engine debuted in the 2027 Corvette Stingray and Grand Sport. The LS6 uses combined port and direct injection and has a compression ratio of 13.0:1 and max engine speed of 6,600 rpm. The bore stays the same as the outgoing LT2 at 4.065 in (103.25 mm), but the stroke is increased to 3.937 in (100 mm), increasing displacement to 6.7 L (6,698 cc; 408.7 cu in).

Applications:

| Year(s) | Model | Power | Torque |
|---|---|---|---|
| 2027–present | Chevrolet Corvette C8 | 535 hp (399 kW) at 6100 rpm | 520 lb⋅ft (705 N⋅m) at 4600 rpm |

==== L78 ====
The L78 is a 6.6 L (6,564 cc; 400.6 cu in) light duty small-block gasoline engine expected to debut in the 2027 Chevrolet Silverado and GMC Sierra 1500 as the flagship gasoline option, replacing the 6.2L L87. It shares its 4.065 in (103.25 mm) bore and 3.858 in (97.99 mm) stroke with the heavy-duty L8T, but uses an aluminum block to save weight over the front axle and improve fuel economy, in addition to using technologies omitted on the L8T such as auto start-stop and cylinder deactivation. The L78 RPO code was previously used by Mark IV big blocks displacing 396 cu in (6.5 L) and 402 cu in (6.6 L), offered in the 1965 Corvette and various mid-size cars from the mid-1960s to the early 1970s.

The L78 is expected to provide a towing capacity of 9,700 lb (4,400 kg) in the Silverado and 9,400 lb (4,264 kg) in the Sierra, with payload ratings of 1,510 lb (685 kg) for the Silverado and 1,450 lb (658 kg) for the Sierra.

| Year(s) | Model | Power | Torque |
|---|---|---|---|
| 2027–present | Chevrolet Silverado/GMC Sierra 1500 | 481 hp (359 kW) at 5800 rpm | 501 lb⋅ft (679 N⋅m) at 4000 rpm |

=== 3.78 in. bore blocks (2027–present) ===
==== L76 ====
The L76 is a 5.7 L (5,675 cc; 346.3 cu in) light-duty gasoline engine expected to debut in the 2027 Chevrolet Silverado and GMC Sierra 1500, replacing the 5.3L L84. It shares its 3.78 in (96.01 mm) bore with the L84, but extends the stroke to 3.858 in (97.99 mm), making it the first undersquare production GM small block. The L76 RPO code was previously used by a 327 cu in (5.4 L) Gen I small block that debuted in the 1963 Corvette and reused by a 6.0L Gen IV LS small block used in various applications.

The L76 is expected to provide a towing capacity of 13,700 lb (6,214 kg) in the Silverado and 13,500 lb (6,123 kg) in the Sierra, with payload ratings of 2,170 lb (984 kg) for the Silverado and 2,140 lb (971 kg) for the Sierra.

| Year(s) | Model | Power | Torque |
|---|---|---|---|
| 2027–present | Chevrolet Silverado/GMC Sierra 1500 | 402 hp (300 kW) at 5500 rpm | 428 lb⋅ft (580 N⋅m) at 4300 rpm |

== Engine table ==
The eighth character in the VIN or the RPO code from the glove box sticker can be used to identify which type of LS engine a vehicle has. If you are looking at donor vehicles, be aware that the 8th character is usually not the same between different platforms (i.e., car vs truck vs SUV, Camaro vs Silverado vs Escalade).

| Years | RPO | Power | Torque | Displacement | Bore | Stroke | Compression ratio | Notes |
Generation III
| 1997–2005 | LS1 | 295–382 hp (220–285 kW) | 323–376 lb⋅ft (438–510 N⋅m) | 5.7 L (346 cu in) | 3.898 in (99.0 mm) | 3.622 in (92.0 mm) | 10.25:1 | Aluminum |
| 1999–2007 | LR4 | 255–285 hp (190–213 kW) | 285–295 lb⋅ft (386–400 N⋅m) | 4.8 L (293 cu in) | 3.780 in (96.0 mm) | 3.268 in (83.0 mm) | 9.45:1 | Iron/Alum. heads |
| 1999–2007 | LM7 | 270–295 hp (201–220 kW) | 315–335 lb⋅ft (427–454 N⋅m) | 5.3 L (325 cu in) | 3.780 in (96.0 mm) | 3.622 in (92.0 mm) | 9.49:1 | Iron/Alum. heads |
| 1999–2008 | LQ4 | 300–335 hp (224–250 kW) | 355–375 lb⋅ft (481–508 N⋅m) | 6.0 L (364 cu in) | 4.000 in (101.6 mm) | 3.622 in (92.0 mm) | 9.40:1 | Iron/Iron-Alum. heads, 1999–2000 engines have iron heads |
| 2001–2005 | LS6 | 385–405 hp (287–302 kW) | 385–400 lb⋅ft (522–542 N⋅m) | 5.7 L (346 cu in) | 3.898 in (99.0 mm) | 3.622 in (92.0 mm) | 10.50:1 | Aluminum |
| 2002–2007 | L59 | 285–295 hp (213–220 kW) | 320–335 lb⋅ft (434–454 N⋅m) | 5.3 L (325 cu in) | 3.780 in (96.0 mm) | 3.622 in (92.0 mm) | 9.50:1 | Iron/Alum. heads, E85-capable |
| 2002–2007 | LQ9 | 345 hp (257 kW) | 380 lb⋅ft (520 N⋅m) | 6.0 L (364 cu in) | 4.000 in (101.6 mm) | 3.622 in (92.0 mm) | 10.00:1 | Iron/Alum. heads |
| 2003–2005 | LM4 | 290 hp (216 kW) | 325 lb⋅ft (441 N⋅m) | 5.3 L (325 cu in) | 3.780 in (96.0 mm) | 3.622 in (92.0 mm) | 9.50:1 | Aluminum |
| 2005–2007 | L33 | 310 hp (231 kW) | 335 lb⋅ft (454 N⋅m) | 5.3 L (325 cu in) | 3.780 in (96.0 mm) | 3.622 in (92.0 mm) | 10.00:1 | Aluminum, only available on 4WD extended-cab standard-bed trucks |
Generation IV
| 2005–2009 | LS2 | 390–400 hp (291–298 kW) | 400 lb⋅ft (540 N⋅m) | 6.0 L (364 cu in) | 4.000 in (101.6 mm) | 3.622 in (92.0 mm) | 10.90:1 | Aluminum |
| 2005–2009 | LH6 | 300–315 hp (224–235 kW) | 330–338 lb⋅ft (447–458 N⋅m) | 5.3 L (325 cu in) | 3.780 in (96.0 mm) | 3.622 in (92.0 mm) | 9.95:1 | Aluminum, AFM, VVT* |
| 2005–2009 | LS4 | 300–303 hp (224–226 kW) | 323 lb⋅ft (438 N⋅m) | 5.3 L (325 cu in) | 3.780 in (96.0 mm) | 3.622 in (92.0 mm) | 10.00:1 | Aluminum, AFM, FWD |
| 2006–2010 | L76 | 348–367 hp (260–274 kW) | 376–385 lb⋅ft (510–522 N⋅m) | 6.0 L (364 cu in) | 4.000 in (101.6 mm) | 3.622 in (92.0 mm) | 10.40:1 | Aluminum, AFM, VVT (truck applications only) |
| 2006–2010 | L98 | 362 hp (270 kW) | 391 lb⋅ft (530 N⋅m) | 6.0 L (364 cu in) | 4.000 in (101.6 mm) | 3.622 in (92.0 mm) | 10.40:1 | Aluminum, L76 with AFM hardware removed |
| 2006–2015 | LS7 | 503–536 hp (375–400 kW) | 443–472 lb⋅ft (601–640 N⋅m) | 7.0 L (427 cu in) | 4.125 in (104.8 mm) | 4.000 in (101.6 mm) | 11.00:1 | Aluminum, Ti connecting rods, dry sump |
| 2007–2008 | L92 | 403 hp (301 kW) | 415–417 lb⋅ft (563–565 N⋅m) | 6.2 L (376 cu in) | 4.065 in (103.3 mm) | 3.622 in (92.0 mm) | 10.50:1 | Aluminum, VVT |
| 2007–2009 | LY2 | 260–295 hp (194–220 kW) | 295–305 lb⋅ft (400–414 N⋅m) | 4.8 L (293 cu in) | 3.780 in (96.0 mm) | 3.268 in (83.0 mm) | 9.08:1 | Iron/Alum. heads |
| 2007–2009 | LY5 | 315–320 hp (235–239 kW) | 335–340 lb⋅ft (454–461 N⋅m) | 5.3 L (325 cu in) | 3.780 in (96.0 mm) | 3.622 in (92.0 mm) | 9.95:1 | Iron/Alum. heads, AFM, VVT* |
| 2007–2013 | LY6 | 361 hp (269 kW) | 385 lb⋅ft (522 N⋅m) | 6.0 L (364 cu in) | 4.000 in (101.6 mm) | 3.622 in (92.0 mm) | 9.60:1 | Iron/Alum. heads, VVT |
| 2007–2014 | LC9 | 315–320 hp (235–239 kW) | 335 lb⋅ft (454 N⋅m) | 5.3 L (325 cu in) | 3.780 in (96.0 mm) | 3.622 in (92.0 mm) | 9.60:1 or 9.95:1 | Aluminum, AFM, VVT*, E85-capable |
| 2007–2014 | LMG | 315–320 hp (235–239 kW) | 335–340 lb⋅ft (454–461 N⋅m) | 5.3 L (325 cu in) | 3.780 in (96.0 mm) | 3.622 in (92.0 mm) | 9.60:1 | Iron/Alum. heads, AFM, VVT*, E85-capable |
| 2008–2009 | LH8 | 300 hp (224 kW) | 320 lb⋅ft (430 N⋅m) | 5.3 L (325 cu in) | 3.780 in (96.0 mm) | 3.622 in (92.0 mm) | 9.90:1 | Aluminum |
| 2008–2009 | LFA | 332 hp (248 kW) | 367 lb⋅ft (498 N⋅m) | 6.0 L (364 cu in) | 4.000 in (101.6 mm) | 3.622 in (92.0 mm) | 10.80:1 | Aluminum, AFM, Hybrid |
| 2008–2014 | LMF | 315–320 hp (235–239 kW) | 335–340 lb⋅ft (454–461 N⋅m) | 5.3 L (325 cu in) | 3.780 in (96.0 mm) | 3.622 in (92.0 mm) | 9.60:1 | Iron/Alum. heads, VVT* |
| 2008–2017 | LS3 | 425–436 hp (317–325 kW) | 424–428 lb⋅ft (575–580 N⋅m) | 6.2 L (376 cu in) | 4.065 in (103.3 mm) | 3.622 in (92.0 mm) | 10.70:1 | Aluminum, sodium exhaust valves |
| 2009–2017 | LSA | 556–580 hp (415–433 kW) | 551–556 lb⋅ft (747–754 N⋅m) | 6.2 L (376 cu in) | 4.065 in (103.3 mm) | 3.622 in (92.0 mm) | 9.00:1 | Aluminum, 1.9 L (116 cu in) supercharger |
| 2009–2013 | L9H | 403 hp (301 kW) | 417 lb⋅ft (565 N⋅m) | 6.2 L (376 cu in) | 4.065 in (103.3 mm) | 3.622 in (92.0 mm) | 10.50:1 | Aluminum, VVT, E85-capable* |
| 2009–2013, 2017 | LS9 | 638 hp (476 kW) | 604 lb⋅ft (819 N⋅m) | 6.2 L (376 cu in) | 4.065 in (103.3 mm) | 3.622 in (92.0 mm) | 9.10:1 | Aluminum, 2.3 L (140 cu in) supercharger, Ti connecting rods, forged pistons, dry sump |
| 2010–2012 | LH9 | 300 hp (224 kW) | 320 lb⋅ft (430 N⋅m) | 5.3 L (325 cu in) | 3.780 in (96.0 mm) | 3.622 in (92.0 mm) | 9.70:1 or 9.90:1 | Aluminum, VVT, E85-capable |
| 2010–2013 | LZ1 | 332 hp (248 kW) | 367 lb⋅ft (498 N⋅m) | 6.0 L (364 cu in) | 4.000 in (101.6 mm) | 3.622 in (92.0 mm) | 10.80:1 | Aluminum, AFM, VVT, Hybrid |
| 2010–2013 | L94 | 403 hp (301 kW) | 417 lb⋅ft (565 N⋅m) | 6.2 L (376 cu in) | 4.065 in (103.3 mm) | 3.622 in (92.0 mm) | 10.40:1 | Aluminum, AFM, VVT, E85-capable |
| 2010–2015 | L99 | 400 hp (298 kW) | 410 lb⋅ft (560 N⋅m) | 6.2 L (376 cu in) | 4.065 in (103.3 mm) | 3.622 in (92.0 mm) | 10.40:1 | Aluminum, AFM, VVT, E85-capable |
| 2010–2017 | L20 | 260–302 hp (194–225 kW) | 295–305 lb⋅ft (400–414 N⋅m) | 4.8 L (293 cu in) | 3.780 in (96.0 mm) | 3.268 in (83.0 mm) | 8.80:1 | Iron/Alum. heads, VVT, E85-capable |
| 2010–2017 | L77 | 349–362 hp (260–270 kW) | 381–391 lb⋅ft (517–530 N⋅m) | 6.0 L (364 cu in) | 4.000 in (101.6 mm) | 3.622 in (92.0 mm) | 10.40:1 | Aluminum, AFM, E85-capable |
| 2010–2020 | L96 | 361 hp (269 kW) | 385 lb⋅ft (522 N⋅m) | 6.0 L (364 cu in) | 4.000 in (101.6 mm) | 3.622 in (92.0 mm) | 9.70:1 | Iron/Alum. heads, VVT, E85-capable |
| 2010–2020 | LC8 | 342 hp (255 kW) | 373 lb⋅ft (506 N⋅m) | 6.0 L (364 cu in) | 4.000 in (101.6 mm) | 3.622 in (92.0 mm) | 9.70:1 | Iron/Alum. heads, VVT, CNG- & LPG-capable |
Generation V
| 2014–2024 | LT1 | 455–460 hp (339–343 kW) | 455–465 lb⋅ft (617–630 N⋅m) | 6.2 L (376 cu in) | 4.065 in (103.3 mm) | 3.622 in (92.0 mm) | 11.50:1 | Aluminum, VVT, AFM, DI, dry sump (Corvette) |
| 2014–2020 | L83 | 355–376 hp (265–280 kW) | 383–416 lb⋅ft (519–564 N⋅m) | 5.3 L (325 cu in) | 3.780 in (96.0 mm) | 3.622 in (92.0 mm) | 11.00:1 | Aluminum, VVT, AFM, DI, E85-capable |
| 2014–2018 | L86 | 420 hp (313 kW) | 460 lb⋅ft (620 N⋅m) | 6.2 L (376 cu in) | 4.065 in (103.3 mm) | 3.622 in (92.0 mm) | 11.50:1 | Aluminum, VVT, AFM, DI |
| 2015–present | LT4 | 640–682 hp (477–509 kW) | 630–659 lb⋅ft (854–893 N⋅m) | 6.2 L (376 cu in) | 4.065 in (103.3 mm) | 3.622 in (92.0 mm) | 10.00:1 | Aluminum, 1.7 L (104 cu in) supercharger, 2.6 L (159 cu in) supercharger (Escalade-V), VVT, AFM, DI, dry sump (Corvette) |
| 2016–2018 | L8B | 355 hp (265 kW) | 383 lb⋅ft (519 N⋅m) | 5.3 L (325 cu in) | 3.780 in (96.0 mm) | 3.622 in (92.0 mm) | 11.00:1 | Aluminum, VVT, AFM, DI, E85-capable |
| 2019 | LT5 | 755 hp (563 kW) | 715 lb⋅ft (969 N⋅m) | 6.2 L (376 cu in) | 4.065 in (103.3 mm) | 3.622 in (92.0 mm) | 10.00:1 | Aluminum, 2.6 L (159 cu in) supercharger, VVT, hybrid port/direct injection, dry sump |
| 2019–2021 | L82 | 355 hp (265 kW) | 383 lb⋅ft (519 N⋅m) | 5.3 L (325 cu in) | 3.780 in (96.0 mm) | 3.622 in (92.0 mm) | 11.00:1 | Aluminum, VVT, AFM, DI, E85-capable |
| 2019-2026 | L84 | 355 hp (265 kW) | 383 lb⋅ft (519 N⋅m) | 5.3 L (325 cu in) | 3.780 in (96.0 mm) | 3.622 in (92.0 mm) | 11.00:1 | Aluminum, VVT, DFM, DI, E85-capable |
| 2020–2026 | LT2 | 490–495 hp (365–369 kW) | 465–470 lb⋅ft (630–637 N⋅m) | 6.2 L (376 cu in) | 4.065 in (103.3 mm) | 3.622 in (92.0 mm) | 11.50:1 | Aluminum, VVT, AFM, DI, dry sump |
| 2019-2026 | L87 | 420 hp (313 kW) | 460 lb⋅ft (620 N⋅m) | 6.2 L (376 cu in) | 4.065 in (103.3 mm) | 3.622 in (92.0 mm) | 11.50:1 | Aluminum, VVT, DFM, DI |
| 2020–2026 | L8T | 350–401 hp (261–299 kW) | 425–464 lb⋅ft (576–629 N⋅m) | 6.6 L (401 cu in) | 4.065 in (103.3 mm) | 3.858 in (98.0 mm) | 10.80:1 | Iron/Alum. heads, VVT, DI |
| 2027–present | L8S | 412 hp (307 kW) | 472 lb⋅ft (640 N⋅m) | 6.6 L (401 cu in) | 4.065 in (103.3 mm) | 3.858 in (98.0 mm) | TBD | Iron/Alum. heads, VVT, DI |
| 2014–2021 | LV3 V6 | 285–297 hp (213–221 kW) | 305–330 lb⋅ft (414–447 N⋅m) | 4.3 L (260 cu in) | 3.921 in (99.6 mm) | 3.622 in (92.0 mm) | 11.00:1 | Aluminum, VVT, AFM, DI, E85-capable |
| 2018–present | LV1 V6 | 265 hp (198 kW) | 295 lb⋅ft (400 N⋅m) | 4.3 L (260 cu in) | 3.921 in (99.6 mm) | 3.622 in (92.0 mm) | 11.00:1 | Aluminum, VVT, DI, E85-capable |
Generation VI
| 2027–present | LS6 | 535 hp (399 kW) | 520 lb⋅ft (710 N⋅m) | 6.7 L (409 cu in) | 4.065 in (103.3 mm) | 3.937 in (100.0 mm) | 13.00:1 | Aluminum, VVT, AFM, hybrid port/direct injection, dry sump |
| 2027- present | L78 | 481 hp (359 kW) | 501 lb⋅ft (679 N⋅m) | 6.6 L (401 cu in) | 4.065 in (103.3 mm) | 3.858 in (98.0 mm) | TBD | Aluminum, VVT, DFM, hybrid port/direct injection |
| 2027-present | L76 | 402 hp (300 kW) | 428 lb⋅ft (580 N⋅m) | 5.7 L (346 cu in) | 3.780 in (96.0 mm) | 3.858 in (98.0 mm) | TBD | Aluminum, VVT, DFM, hybrid port/direct injection |
Aftermarket / OEM
| 2025–present | L8P | 523 hp (390 kW) | 543 lb⋅ft (736 N⋅m) | 6.6 L (401 cu in) | 4.065 in (103.3 mm) | 3.858 in (98.0 mm) | 10.80:1 | Iron/Alum. heads, DI |
| | LSX376 | 473 hp (353 kW) | 444 lb⋅ft (602 N⋅m) | 6.2 L (376 cu in) | 4.065 in (103.3 mm) | 3.622 in (92.0 mm) | 9.00:1 | Iron/Alum. heads |
| | LSX454 | 505 hp (377 kW) | 515 lb⋅ft (698 N⋅m) | 7.4 L (454 cu in) | 4.185 in (106.3 mm) | 4.125 in (104.8 mm) | 10.00:1 | Iron/Alum. heads |
| | LSX454 | 627 hp (468 kW) | 586 lb⋅ft (795 N⋅m) | 7.4 L (454 cu in) | 4.185 in (106.3 mm) | 4.125 in (104.8 mm) | 11.00:1 | Iron/Alum. heads |
| | LSX454R | 776 hp (579 kW) | 680 lb⋅ft (922 N⋅m) | 7.4 L (454 cu in) | 4.185 in (106.3 mm) | 4.125 in (104.8 mm) | 13.10:1 | Iron/Alum. heads |
Note 1: Depending upon vehicle application (truck, SUV, car); horsepower, torque, and fuel requirements will vary. With few exceptions, redline RPM is generally 6,000 or higher. Note 2: Block features are generally dependent upon the generation but are not always built-in. Typical features are AFM (Active Fuel Management), VVT (Variable Valve Train), and Front Wheel Drive (FWD). Features marked with an * indicate that only certain model years had that feature.

== Known issues ==
In the early production run of the LS-series engine, some engines encountered 'piston slap' during the first few minutes after a cold engine start; this sound is caused by the pistons rocking slightly in the cylinder until they reach operating temperature/size. "Piston slap" sometimes sounds more like a knock or the sound of a diesel engine running. It is typically only present when the engine is cold and disappears as the engine reaches operating temperature.

Another common problem with the 2001–2006 5.3L engines was cracking cylinder heads. This is commonly called the "Castech Head" failure. GM issued a Technical Service Bulletin on this failure to help service technicians identify the problem. The head casting number (which can be viewed from the passenger side of the vehicle just in front of the valve cover) was 706. Some heads with this casting number would fail (but not all of them) as GM had different suppliers for the same head. The failure was due to undetected porosity around the oil drains in the head.

Yet another common problem with the 2005–2016 fourth generation V8 LS engines was a failure of the specialized lifters in engines equipped with the AFM system. While in AFM operation, the lifters would sometimes fail to come out of AFM mode and cause the engine to go into 'limp home' mode. In this mode damage could occur to the pistons, camshaft, or the lifters themselves. The resulting solution was a package of components that would replace the lifters, lifter guides, camshaft, Valve Lifter Oil Manifold (VLOM) plate. Cylinder heads were required to be removed from the engine in order to replace all the components. The engine computer also required reprogramming to permanently Disable AFM.

=== Issues specific to the L87 ===
In the 2020s, the 6,162 cc (6.2 L) L87 faced scrutiny due to numerous issues related to oiling and bearing failures.

It was initially believed that the recommended 0W-20 oil weight, chosen to improve fuel economy, resulted in main and rod bearing failures, but independent investigations by two different shops, I Do Cars and Dave's Auto Center, appeared to indicate otherwise. Dave's Auto Center tore down a like-new unit that had begun to show signs of failure, while I Do Cars tore down a relatively used one with around 60,000 to 90,000 miles that had already suffered multiple severe rod bearing failures. The like-new L87 exhibited pitting and small gouges in the rod bearings that pointed to improper lubrication. Dave's Auto Center found excessively large lubrication ports that did not provide sufficient oil pressure and coated the bearings unevenly.

Dave's Auto Center tested the crankshaft of the like-new L87 and compared its surface finish to that of an aftermarket crankshaft using the metrics of R_{a} (average roughness) and R_{z} (mean roughness depth). R_{z} is a measure of the average difference between the deepest valleys and highest peaks in a rough surface. They found that the R_{a} of the L87 crankshaft was around double that of the aftermarket crankshaft, and that the R_{a}–R_{z} ratio was around 10:1, nearly double that of expected. They also discovered excessive chamfering on the L87 crankshaft. Chamfering is used to reduce stress concentrations and improve oil flow, but the excessive chamfering on the L87 crank, at approximately 400 thousandths of an inch, causes oil to bleed off excessively, ultimately reducing oil pressure and lubrication effectiveness.

== Build-your-own program ==
In 2011, Chevrolet Performance began to offer the build your own engine program for LS7 (part number 19259944) or LS9 (part number 19259945) crate engines. It also provides customers the experience of visiting GM's unique Performance Build Center in Wixom, Michigan, where they will join a specially trained engine builder to assist in the start-to-finish assembly of the engine they purchased – from installing the crankshaft in the cylinder block to topping off the engine with its intake system. In the case of the LS9, it also means installing the supercharger assembly. Upon completion, a personalized nameplate is added to the engine.

The build-your-own engine program associated with the V8 engines, available for buyers of Chevrolet Corvette, Cadillac XLR, and certain top-spec Chevrolet Camaro models, was temporarily halted after the closure of GM Performance Build Center in Wixom, Michigan. The program's venue was reported to be relocated to the Corvette assembly plant in Bowling Green, Kentucky.

== Aftermarket ==
=== LS5.5R ===
The LS5.5R engine was designed and built by GM for the Corvette C6.R in the GT2 (later LM GTE) class, at the Wixom Performance Build Center, where the production Corvette engines were made. GT2 rules stated that displacement for naturally aspirated engines could not exceed 5.5 liters (5,500 cubic centimeters; 340 cubic inches). This forced Corvette Racing and GM to reduce the size of their new engine, which they did by decreasing the crankshaft stroke to 3.185 inches (80.9 millimeters) from 3.875 in (98.4 mm) in the previous Katech LS7.R based engine. At 5,800 rpm, the LS5.5R produces 485 horsepower and at 4,500 rpm produces 495 lb⋅ft (671 N⋅m) of torque. For the Corvette C7.R, the engine was renamed to the LT5.5R and upgraded, utilizing direct injection which improved fuel mileage by three percent.

=== LS7.R ===
The LS7.R engine is a variation of the LS7 used in the C6.R American Le Mans Series racecar. It was crowned as Global Motorsport engine of the year by a jury of 50 race engine engineers on the Professional Motorsport World Expo 2006 in Cologne, Germany.

=== LSX ===
LSx is also used to denote any LS engine.

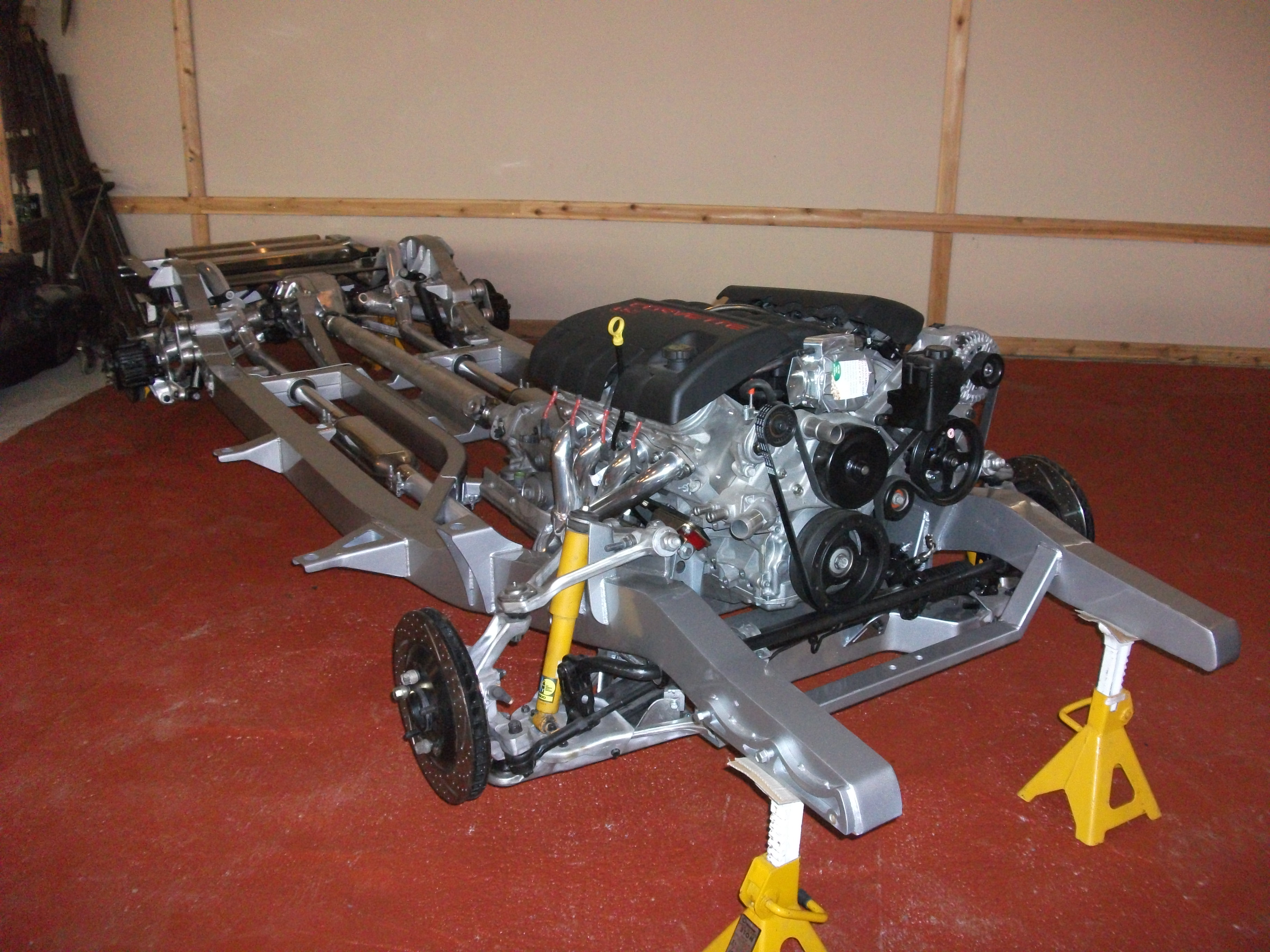
Chassis with LSX engine

At the 2006 SEMA show, GM Performance Parts introduced the LSX engine, an all-new cast-iron racing block based on the LS7 engine. It was designed with help from drag racing legend Warren Johnson. It offers displacements ranging from 364 to 511 cu in (6.0 to 8.4 L) with a bore and stroke of 4 1/4 in × 4 1/2 in (108.0 mm × 114.3 mm) and is capable of withstanding 2,500 bhp (1,864 kW). This block incorporates two extra rows of head-bolt holes per bank for increased clamping capacity. The six bolt steel main caps are the same ones used on the LS7 engine. The engine debuted at the auto show in a customized 1969 Camaro owned by Reggie Jackson. The LSX was available starting the second quarter of 2007, set to be available in authorized dealerships and retailers on March 31, 2007. The Hennessey Venom GT also uses the LSX engine based on LS7.

Chevrolet Performance LSX Bowtie block includes LSX specific six-bolts-per-cylinder head bolt pattern, billet-steel six-bolt dowel-located main bearing caps, extra-thick deck for maximum clamping force, extra-thick cylinder walls allow increased bore capacity (maximum 4.2 in (106.7 mm) bore still allows 0.2 in (5.1 mm) minimum wall thickness), true priority main oiling system, main web bay-to-bay breathing holes reduce crank windage, orange powder coat finish, machined bore at 3.88 in (98.6 mm) is ready for final boring/honing.

A 396 cu in (6.5 L) version engineered by Ilmor is used in NASCAR for the Craftsman Truck Series and the ARCA Racing Series as an option engine. Most teams in both series (known as "NT1" in the Truck Series and the "ARCA 396" in ARCA) have switched to the engine because of cost savings, as engines must last 1,500 miles and rebuilds are about one-thirds the cost of a new engine.

==== LSX376 ====
Chevrolet Performance LSX376 crate engines are updated versions of LSX crate engine family designed to support up to 1,000 hp (746 kW). All models use the Chevrolet Performance LSX Bowtie block.

LSX376-B15 (part number 19299306) includes forged steel crankshaft, forged powdered metal I-beam rods (both the crankshaft and rods from the LSA engine), forged aluminum pistons (9.0:1 compression), and high-flow rectangular-port six-bolt LSX-LS3 heads for supercharged and turbocharged combinations producing up to 15 psi (1.0 bar) of boost and up to about 1,000 hp (746 kW).

LSX376-B8 (part number 19171049) is a more economical version that is capable of approximately 8 psi (0.55 bar), for an engine producing approximately 600 hp (447 kW). It is designed for production-style supercharger and turbo systems used without enhancements or modifications.

==== LSX454 and LSX454R ====
Chevrolet Performance created the 454 big-block Chevy race engine in 1970 and continued production of the crate engine through 2001. The addition of EFI and picking up the Vortec 7400 name took place in 1996 which was replaced with the Vortec 8100 platform once the 7400 was retired. Chevrolet Performance released the 454 again in 2011 as a small-block crate engine dubbed the LSX454R officially rated at 776 horsepower at 7,000 rpm and 649 lb-ft of torque at 5,100 rpm. The LSX454R was discontinued in July 2018 and was recorded as one of the more powerful LS crate engines to be assembled from Chevy Performance.

=== Noonan Race Engineering ===
Noonan Race Engineering developed two billet aluminum blocks based on the LS engine. Bore sizes are up to 4.185 in (106.3 mm) and stroke up to 4.500 in (114.3 mm) are available, making a 495 cu in (8.1 L) displacement possible. The billet construction provides added block integrity suited to high horsepower applications. The block design incorporates turbocharger pressure feed lines in the front of the valley and oil dump ports in the side of the block to return oil to the sump. In addition to the solid block, a waterjacketed version was designed to provide better cooling options for street or endurance purposes. Noonan also developed intake manifolds for the LS specifically for forced induction.

== See also ==
- Chevrolet 90° V6 engine
- General Motors Vortec engine
- List of GM engines
