= List of automobile manufacturers of the United States =

Automobile manufacturers of the United States include:

== Current manufacturers ==
=== Big Three ===
The currently active brands from the "Big Three" manufacturers (Ford, General Motors and Stellantis) are shown below.

| Parent company | Brand | Notes |
|---|---|---|
| General Motors | Buick | Founded in 1899 as 'Buick Auto-Vim and Power Company' and acquired by General Motors in 1908. |
| General Motors | Cadillac | Founded as Henry Ford Company in 1901, renamed to Cadillac following Henry Ford's departure in 1902. Acquired by General Motors in 1909. |
| General Motors | Chevrolet | Founded in 1911 and acquired by General Motors in 1918. |
| General Motors | GMC | Founded in 1900 as the Grabowsky Motor Company, renamed the Rapid Motor Vehicle Company in 1902. Rapid was acquired in 1909 by General Motors, which merged it with the Reliance Motor Car Company in 1911 to form the General Motors Truck Company (GMTC). In 1912 the two brands were replaced with the GMC brand. |
| Stellantis North America | Chrysler | Founded in 1925 from the remnants of the Maxwell Motor Company. Acquired by Daimler-Benz in 1998, forming DaimlerChrysler. Divested in 2007 and acquired by Fiat S.p.A. in 2014, forming Fiat Chrysler Automobiles (FCA). FCA and PSA Group merged in 2021 to form Stellantis. |
| Stellantis North America | Dodge | Founded in 1914 and acquired by Chrysler in 1928. |
| Stellantis North America | Jeep | Founded in 1941 by Willys-Overland, which merged with Kaiser Motors in 1953. Kaiser Industries divested its automotive business to AMC in 1970, itself acquired by Chrysler in 1987. |
| Stellantis North America | Ram Trucks | Formed in 2010 during a restructure of Chrysler's truck brands. |
| Ford Motor Company | Ford | Founded in 1903 as Ford. |
| Ford Motor Company | Lincoln | Founded in 1917 and acquired by Ford Motor Company in 1922. |

=== Major EV companies ===
- Lucid Motors (2007–present)
- Rivian Automotive, Inc. (2009–present)
- Tesla (2003–present)

=== Other companies ===
- AC Propulsion (1992–present)
- AIO Motors (2020–present)
- AM General (1971–present)
- Anteros Coachworks (2005–present)
- Aptera Motors (2005–present)
- Arcimoto (2007–present)
- Aria Group (2017–present)
- Atlis Motor Vehicles (2016–present)
- Aurica Motors (2010–present)
- Alpha Motor Corporation (2020–present)
- AlloyCars Aluminum Automobiles (1996–present)
- Bauer Limited Production (2012–present)
- Berrien Buggy (1968–present)
- Bollinger Motors (2014–present)
- BXR Motors (2008–present)
- Callaway Cars (1977–present)
- Canoo (2017–2025)
- Commuter Cars (2004–present)
- Cord (1929–1937, 2017–present)
- Czinger (2019–present)
- Cruise Automation (2013–present)
- DDR Motorsport (2001–present)
- Deco Rides (2000–present)
- De Leon (1905-1906)
- DF Kit Cars (1993–present)
- Dio Cars (1991–present)
- Dove Racing (2008–present)
- Drako Motors (2013–present)
- Drakan Motor Cars (2015–present)
- DeLorean Motor Company (Texas) (1995–present)
- Detroit Electric (1907–1939, 2008–present)
- Elation Motors (2014–present)
- Elio Motors (2009–present)
- Equus Automotive (2013–present)
- Everett-Morrison Motorcars (1983–present)
- Exotic Rides (2014–present)
- Exomotive (2011–present)
- Falcon Motors Corporation (2020--present)
- Falcon Motorsports (2009–present)
- Faraday Future (2014–present)
- Factory Five Racing (1995–present)
- Fisker Inc (2015–present)
- Gagliardi Design (2003–present)
- Global Electric Motorcars (1998–present)
- Hennessey Special Vehicles (2017–present)
- Hyperion Motors (2011–present)
- Karma Automotive (2016–present)
- Kepler Motors (2009–present)
- Laffite Supercars (2015–present)
- Lordstown Motors (2018–present)
- Lucra Cars (2006–present)
- Lyons Motor Car (2011–present)
- Meyers Manx (1964–present)
- Mullen Technologies (2014–present)
- Next Autoworks (2006–present)
- Myers Motors (2004–present)
- N2A Motors (2004–present)
- Niama-Reisser (2005–present)
- Nikola Corporation (2014–present)
- Olympian Motors (2021–present)
- Overland-E (2020–present)
- Palatov Motorsport (2008–present)
- Panoz (1989–present)
- Polaris Inc (1954–present)
- RAESR (2014–present)
- Ronn Motor Group (2007–present)
- Revo Zero (2020–present)
- Rezvani Motors (2014–present)
- RINDEV (2020–present)
- Rush Auto Works (2017–present)
- Saleen Automotive (1983–present)
- Scarab-Motorsports LLC (2006–present)
- Scout Motors (2022-present)
- Scuderia Cameron Glickenhaus (2010–present)
- Shelby American (1992–present)
- Simpson Design (1978–present)
- Slate Auto (2022–present)
- Solar Transport Systems (2023–present)
- SSC North America (1999–present)
- Studebaker Motor Company(2010–present)
- Superformance (1996–present)
- Superlite Cars (2007–present)
- Tanom Motors (2010–present)
- Transtar Racing (2010–present)
- Telo Trucks (2022–present)
- Trion Supercars (2012–present)
- United Motorcar Company (2009–present)
- Valarra (2019–present)
- Vanderhall Motor Works (2010–present)
- Vaydor(2013–present)
- VIA Motors (2010–present)
- Visionary Vehicles (2002–present)
- VLF Automotive (2012–present)
- Waymo (2009–present)
- Wheego Technologies (2009–present)
- Workhorse Group (1998–present)

== See also ==
- Automotive industry in the United States
- List of automobile manufacturers
- List of car brands

== Bibliography ==
- Georgano, Nick, ed. (2000). Beaulieu Encyclopedia of the Automobile. Fitzroy Dearborn. ISBN 9781579582937.
- Kimes, Beverly; Clark Jr., Henry Austin (1996). Standard Catalog of American Cars 1805–1942 (Third ed.). Krause Publications. ISBN 0-87341-428-4.
- Kimes, Beverly (1997). Kowalke, Ron (ed.). Standard Catalog of American Cars 1946–1975 (Fourth ed.). Krause Publications. ISBN 9780873415217.
- Mazur, Eligiusz, ed. (2006). "World of Cars 2006/2007: Worldwide Car Catalogue". World of Cars: Worldwide Car Catalogue. Media Connection. ISSN 1734-2945.
