= Vanderhall Laguna =

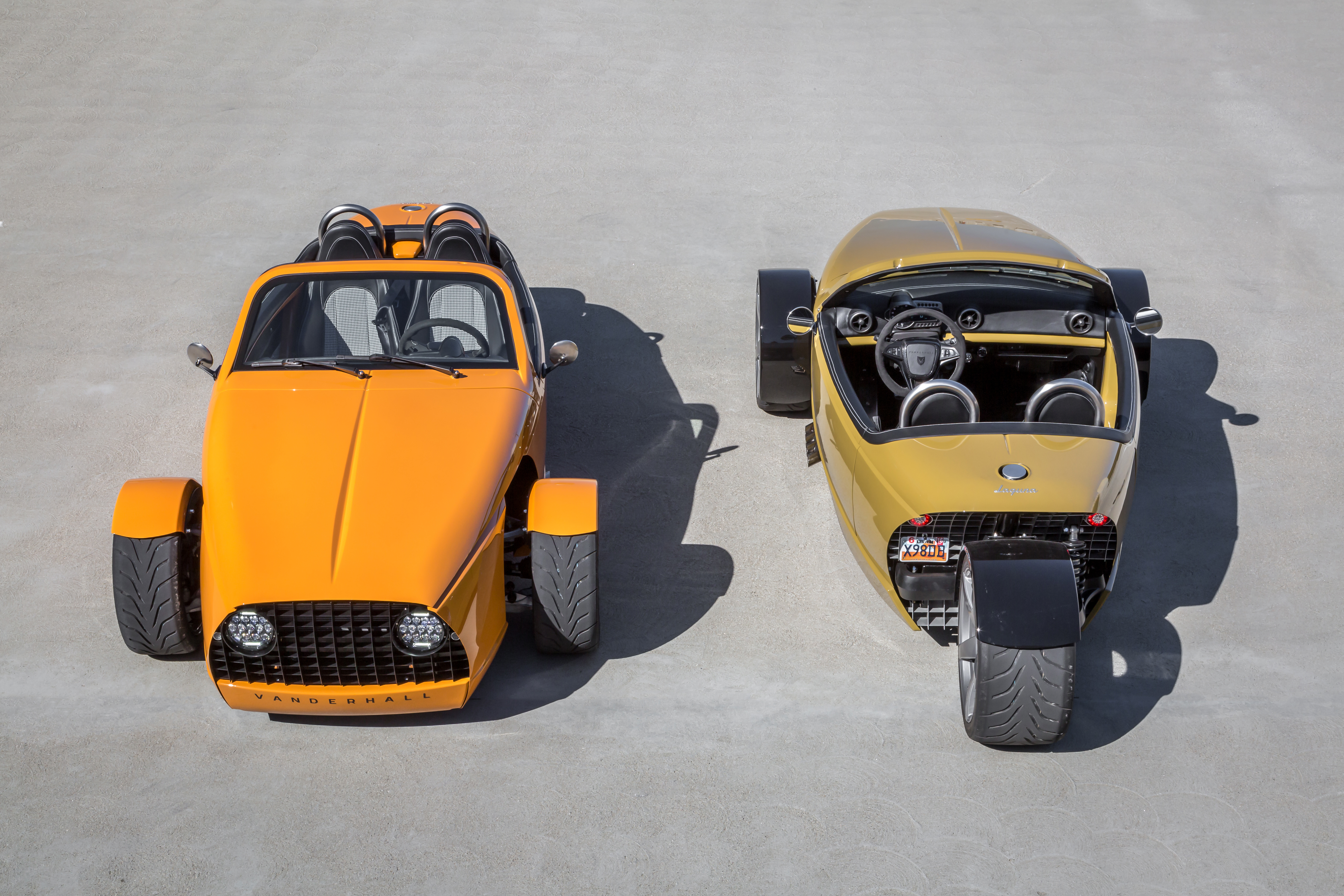

Overview
- Production: 2016–2018

Body and chassis
- Body style: Roadster, sports car (S)

Powertrain
- Engine: 1.5 L SGE turbo I4
- Transmission: 6-speed automatic; 6-speed manual

Dimensions
- Length: 3,914 mm (154.1 in)
- Width: 1,734 mm (68.3 in)
- Height: 1,239 mm (48.8 in)

Chronology
- Successor: Vanderhall Carmel

The Vanderhall Laguna is a three-wheeled roadster produced by the American vehicle manufacturer Vanderhall Motor Works from 2016 to 2018.

== History ==
The Laguna debuted in March 2016 as the first vehicle in the history of Vanderhall. The car took the form of the so-called autocycle, being a tricycle which combined the features of a motorcycle with a sports car.

Production and sales of Laguna in the United States began in July 2016, with a price of $49,950 for the cheapest variant and $77,000 for the top variant. The hand-made roadster was manufactured at Vanderhall's primary facility in Provo, Utah.

== Specifications ==
The Laguna is a roadster body type, which created a streamlined, narrow body made of aluminum components co-created by hand-assembled elements made of carbon fiber, which allowed for a relatively low total weight of over 700 kg (1,500 lb).

The luxuriously decorated passenger cabin made it possible to accommodate two passengers, adapting numerous interior design elements, such as steering wheel from the then General Motors models. The Vanderhall Laguna is a front-wheel drive car powered by a 1.5 L SGE turbo I4 engine.
