= Laffite =

Laffite may refer to:

== People ==
- Jacques Laffite (born 1943), French racing driver
- Margot Laffite (born 1980), French racing driver and TV presenter

== Other ==
- Laffite Automobili, sports car manufacturer
- Laffite X-Road, off-road sports car

== See also ==
- Laffite-Toupière, commune in the Haute-Garonne department of France.
