= Wonder Motor Car Company =

American automobile maker 1909–1909

The Wonder Motor Car Company
- Company type: Automobile Manufacturing
- Industry: Automotive
- Founded: 1909
- Defunct: 1909
- Headquarters: Kansas City, Missouri, United States
- Area served: United States
- Products: Vehicles; Automotive parts

The Wonder Motor Car Company was a very short lived car company in 1909 that was derived from the Kansas City Motor Car Company as a last ditch effort to stay in business and continue car production. The Kansas City Motor Car Company which made cars and trucks from 1905 to 1909 was itself derived from the Caps Brothers Manufacturing Company that briefly made cars in 1905. No examples of any Caps Brothers, Kansas City, or Wonder cars or trucks are known to exist today.

== See also ==
- Kansas City Motor Car Company – Defunct American motor vehicle manufacturer
- Caps Brothers Manufacturing Company – Defunct American motor vehicle manufacturer
- List of defunct automobile manufacturers of the United States
- List of automobile manufacturers of the United States
- Brass Era car – Automotive manufacturing era (1896–1915)
- History of the automobile
- History of the Kansas City metropolitan area
