= Kansas City Motor Car Company =

Defunct American motor vehicle manufacturer

- Type: Automobile Manufacturing
- Industry: Automotive
- Founded: 1905; 121 years ago
- Defunct: 1909; 117 years ago
- Headquarters: Kansas City, Missouri, United States
- Area served: United States
- Products: Vehicles; Automotive parts

The Kansas City Motor Car Company was a manufacturer of automobiles in the Sheffield neighborhood in Northeast Kansas City, Missouri from 1905 to 1909 and was one of the twenty now defunct automakers operating out of Kansas City in the early 20th century.

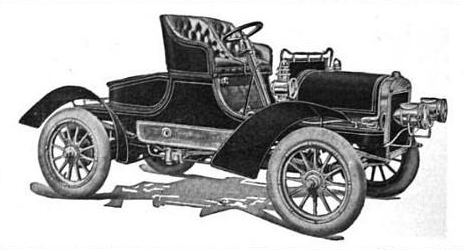
1905 Kansas City Two Passenger Runabout

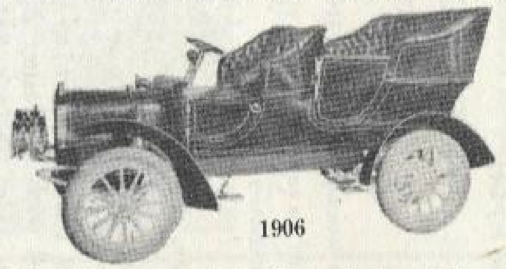
1906 Kansas City Touring Car

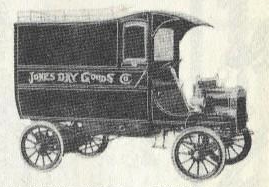
1906 Kansas City Panel Truck

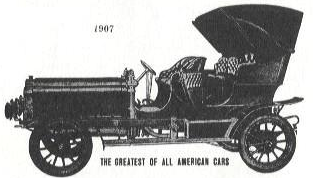
1907 Kansas City Six Cylinder Touring Car with Victorian top

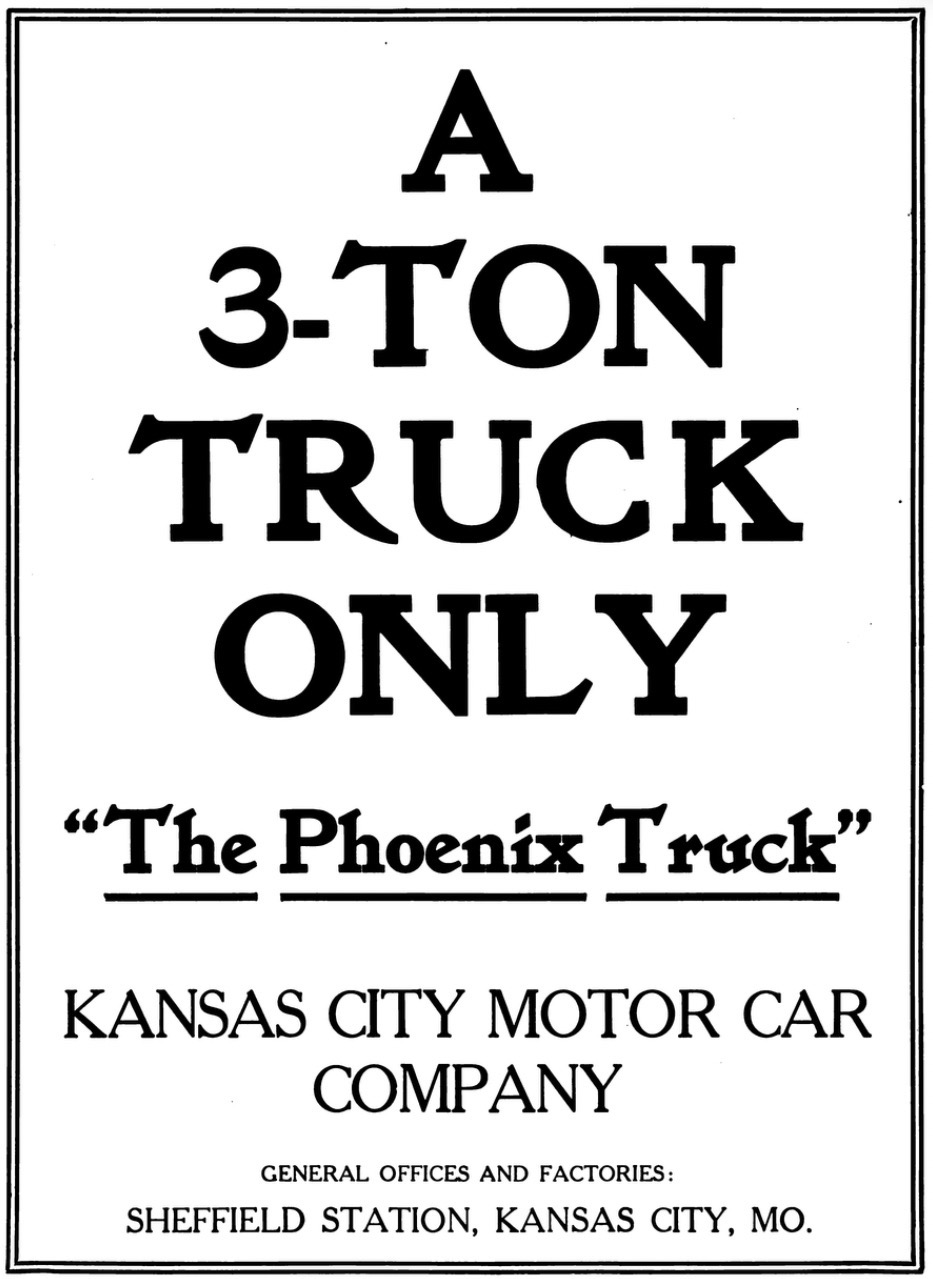
Kansas City Motor Car Company advertisement (1907) 3 to truck

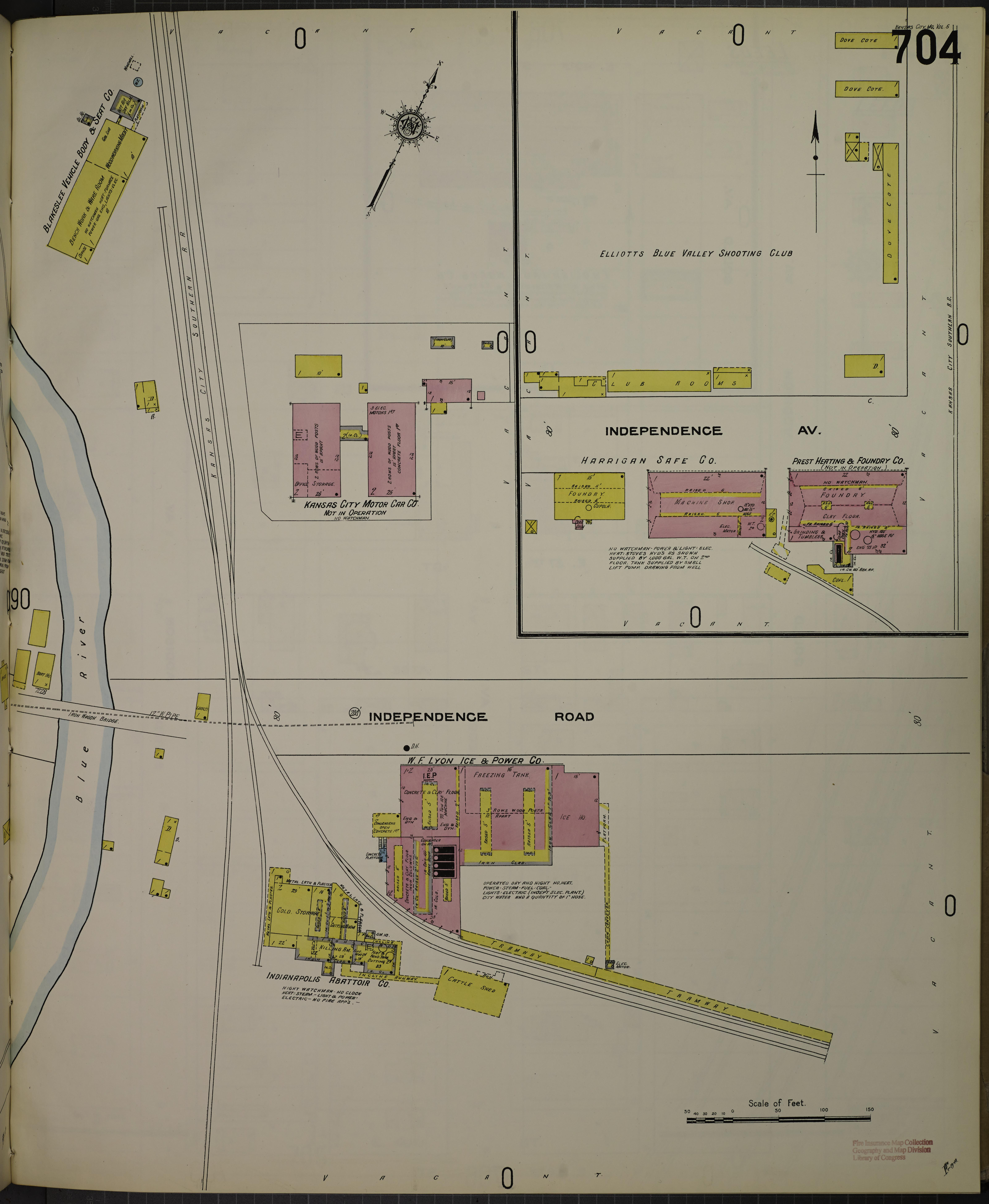
Kansas City Motor Car Company plant (1909) not in operation

== History ==
The Kansas City Motor Car Company was formed when the Caps brothers of The Caps Brothers Manufacturing Company who had only been building cars for a few months in 1905 merged their interest in a new company called The Kansas City Motor Car Company. The Kansas City Motor Car Company offered a wide range of vehicles from 1905 to 1909, when in a last ditch effort to stay in business, the company was reorganized as The Wonder Motor Car Company and manufactured the Kansas City Wonder Automobile briefly in 1909. No examples of any Caps Brothers, Kansas City, or Wonder cars or trucks are known to exist today.

One car is remaining in New Jersey with a private collector. It has been the family's car since new in 1902. It’s the Gleason model M high wheel touring car.

== Models ==
Through their five years in the business, the Kansas City Motor Car Company manufactured a full line of vehicles ranging early on from two to four and five seater cars with 20 horse air cooled two cylinder engines and 50 horsepower four cylinder engines. Later in May 1906 the company announced they would be changing all of their models and equipping them with a new water cooled six cylinder engine with an advertised 75 horsepower. Surviving advertisements and a contemporary newspaper stated that commercial vehicles were also made and were rated to haul 1, 2, 3, 6, and 8 tons.

== Press Coverage ==
Very little information on these cars has survived. Just a handful of advertisements and a couple newspapers and magazines of the day.

=== 1905 Chicago and New York motor shows ===
The Kansas City Star, 10 December 1905 › Page 6: "The Chicago and New York motor shows are now interesting Kansas City motorists. Up to this time there has been little interest shown by Kansas City drivers in the big shows of the country. This was because there were few automobile men here. Among those who are planning to attend the New York show are Frank E. Weir and George K. Wheeler of the Kansas City Motor Car company, L. P. Moriarty and H. G. Biakesley, secretary of the Kansas City Automobile club. At the Chicago show the Kansas City Motor Car Company will have an exhibit. This company, the only automobile manufacturing establishment in Kansas City, will show several cars. The list includes a touring car, a runabout, an eight-ton truck and a couple of delivery wagon» of which the company has been making a specialty, George Chambers of Lawrence, Kas., last week purchased a touring car from the Kansas City Motor Car company. With J. E. Caps of the company he drove the car to Iawrence. The roads were in good condition and the trip was a successful one." This 1905 article states that the Kansas City Motor Car Company was "the only automobile manufacturing establishment in Kansas City", although several other makers were in town even less information on these has survived.

=== 1906 Race Car and Buffalo to Boston test run ===
The August 9, 1906 issue of The Automobile twice mentions the Kansas City Motor Car Company in the News and Trade Miscellany section, first they report on a possible race car: "Plans for a big racing car are said to be under consideration by the Kansas City Motor Car Company in Kansas City, Mo." The magazine goes on to cover the upcoming two ton commercial wagon test run: "On August 15 the Kansas City Motor Car Company of Kansas City, Mo will start a two ton commercial wagon on a test run from Buffalo, N.Y., to Boston passing through Utica, Syracuse, Schenectady, New York City, New Haven, New London, and Providence R.I. to Boston. It is expected that Boston will be reached by August, 22. The total distance is about 850 miles. George K. Wheeler general manager of the company, J. E. Caps, two chauffeurs and newspaper men and representatives of the A. A. A. will constitute the party; a 50-horsepower Kansas City tourabout will also make the trip."

== See also ==
Caps Brothers Manufacturing Company
Wonder Motor Car Company
List of defunct automobile manufacturers of the United States
List of automobile manufacturers of the United States
Brass Era car
History of the automobile
History of the Kansas City metropolitan area
