= DeLorean Motor Company (Texas) =

Automobile company established in 1995, based in Humble

- Trade name: DeLorean Motor Company
- Type: Private
- Industry: Automotive
- Founded: May 12, 1995; 31 years ago
- Founder: Stephen Wynne
- Headquarters: Humble, Texas, U.S.
- Key people: Stephen Wynne (CEO)
- Products: Automobiles
- Website: delorean.com

DeLorean Motor Company (also doing business as Classic DMC) is an American company based in Humble, Texas, established in 1995 by Liverpool-born mechanic Stephen Wynne, using the branding of the defunct automobile manufacturer. It has no direct connection to the original company, but rather supplies parts and services to owners of DeLoreans, such as maintenance, restoration, and the sale of NOS (new old stock), OEM (original equipment manufacturer), aftermarket, and replacement parts.

The company acquired the former manufacturer's remaining parts inventory and registered its stylized "DMC" logo trademark. It has an authorized dealer in Orlando, Florida and a company-owned location in Huntington Beach, California.

In 2022, the company announced it was entering production on a brand new EV DeLorean, inspired by the DMC-12. Despite multiple announcements, a Super Bowl advertisement, and the sale of non-fungible tokens as receipts for deposits on the vehicle, known as the Alpha5, DMC has not produced a final model as of January 2026.

== History ==
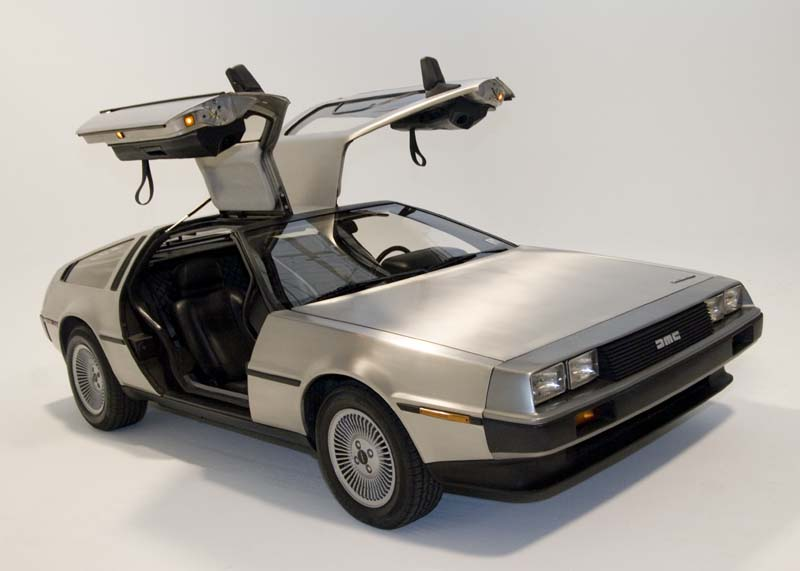
Original DeLorean

The original DeLorean Motor Company was founded in 1975 by businessman John DeLorean, beginning production in 1981 of a distinctive sports car with gull-wing doors and a stainless steel exterior. The company went into bankruptcy and ceased manufacturing in 1982. However, the prominent appearance of a DeLorean in the 1985 film Back to the Future and its sequels helped maintain interest in the vehicles. Businessman Stephen Wynne purchased the remaining parts for the car, selling them out of Houston, Texas, and adopted the name of the original company on the grounds that it was no longer a going concern.

In August 2007, Wynne announced plans to start selling refurbished cars. At that time, a DeLorean could be assembled using a combination of new, original, and reproduction parts and a donor car (to still carry a 1980s title) for US$57,500.

On December 3, 2009, DMC released a collection of T-shirts and hats in collaboration with streetwear brand The Hundreds, featuring modernized images of the DeLorean in Los Angeles culture-based graphic designs. The collaboration project also includes a special edition DeLorean wrapped in The Hundreds recognizable JAGS pattern in black and flat black which was for sale beginning December 3, 2009, and displayed at The Hundreds flagship store in Los Angeles for a day.

In November 2010, in collaboration with DMC, Nike released a limited edition DeLorean Dunk shoe with an estimated production of 1,000 pairs at a suggested retail price of $90.

In October 2011, DMC announced intentions to sell custom-made electric DeLoreans by 2013, development on which has been stopped pending the outcome of the release of regulations pertaining to the Low Volume Vehicle Manufacturing Act.

In October 2017, DMC launched DMC Watches, in collaboration with a UK-based licensee which released two collections featuring design features from the DeLorean.

== Proposed new production ==
Due to the passage of the Low Volume Vehicle Manufacturing Act, the production of the DeLorean was announced in 2017, with 300 new cars to be produced by DMC. DMC originally anticipated building approximately 50 vehicles per year over the next 6 years with an estimated retail price of US$100,000. Both the EPA and NHTSA had one year to establish a process for companies to register with each agency and to issue any necessary regulation to implement the Low Volume Vehicle Manufacturing Act. However, the regulations were not published until December 2019. As of October 2022, DMC has placed this production on indefinite hold.

=== Alpha5 ===
In May 2022, DeLorean announced a plan to launch its latest model and concept for an electric car. The company stated the Alpha5 EV will have 300 miles of range and signature gull-winged doors and can reach 60 mph in around 2.99 seconds. Additionally, the company announced that the Alpha5 will come with a 100kWh battery. The company stated the model would be revealed in Pebble Beach on August 21, 2022, and in August 24th a review video of the car was posted in the YouTube platform, where it is claimed to have a release date of 2024.

On August 18, 2025, an official announcement was made on X (formerly Twitter), stating "Today, we are on track, operating with speed and precision as the average time from concept vehicle to production is 5 years". The marketing campaign for the car has been lately based on blockchain terminology to attract investors via the launch of their $DMC token. As of August 2026, the car still hasn't been launched.

== Lawsuits ==
=== Lawsuits filed against the DeLorean Motor Company ===
In 2014, Sally Baldwin, the widow of John DeLorean, sued the DMC for misuse of trademarks and images which were never purchased after the bankruptcy of the original company, claiming that they were still owned by his estate. On October 20, 2015, the lawsuit was settled out of court for an undisclosed sum in exchange for DMC having the rights to use the DeLorean Motor Company name, trademarks and logo.

In April 2018, Baldwin again sued DMC for rights to the royalties from Universal Studios from the Back to the Future films. In October 2018, U.S. District Court Judge Jose Linares concluded that materials licensed to Universal were included in the earlier 2015 settlement. In the court ruling, the judge pointed out that in the 2015 settlement the DeLorean Estate pledged not to sue the automaker for using "DeLorean" and the "DMC logo," and that Universal was given the right to use the appearance of the DeLorean car, and the right to use the "DeLorean" name and the "DMC" logo as it appears on the front of the time machine. Furthermore, the 2015 settlement agreement and Universal Studios agreement both pertain to the use of the above-mentioned names and trademarks in similar context, in this instance, the manufacturing and merchandising of products displaying the DeLorean car's image and brand. Shortly thereafter, Sally Baldwin appealed this decision. In an opinion dated December 5, 2019, the Third Circuit Court of Appeals affirmed the lower court decision in favor of DMC Texas.

On August 8, 2022, a lawsuit was filed against Delorean Motors Reimagined LLC in the Southern District of Texas. Brought by Karma Automotive LLC, it is alleged that its former vice president of sales and customer experience and the chief revenue officer formed their own company, Reimagined Automotive LLC, with the intent of stealing a joint venture project with DeLorean Motor Co. According to the lawsuit, the former employees were tasked with developing and proposing ideas for the joint venture, called Project 88, which was led by ex-vice president Joost de Vries, ex-chief revenue officer Alan Yuan, Troy Beetz, and Neilo Harris. The four men founded DeLorean Motors Reimagined LLC in November 2021 after De Vries resigned from Karma Automotive LLC, but Yuan, Beetz and Harris would remain employed by Karma Automotive until February 2022. Reimagined Automotive LLC and the joint venture of DeLorean Motors Reimagined LLC are being sued for breach of contract, breach of fiduciary duty, fraud, and tortious interference. Additionally, Karma Automotive LLC claims that federal and state laws were violated by the misappropriation of trade secrets.

A subsequent lawsuit was brought against the DeLorean Motor Company by design company Italdesign in 2023, which provided the concept models for the Alpha5 EV. Italdesign alleged that they were never paid for work done on the concept; they received a judgment in their favor in early 2026, forcing DMC to pay them an owed $4.6 million.

=== Lawsuits filed by the DeLorean Motor Company ===
In 2021, the DeLorean Motor Company filed a lawsuit against Cornwall resident ‘Ty DeLorean’ after he presented his ‘DMC-21’ prototype at the 2021 British Motor Show as a legitimate DeLorean car. The car was a Reliant Rialto extensively modified to resemble an original DMC-12, with features including gullwing doors and a paint job resembling brushed aluminium. Ty DeLorean, formerly known as Ben Grainger, claimed he was the illegitimate son of John Z DeLorean. Despite losing a high court battle against the DeLorean Motor Company, and being instructed to pay £20,000 in legal costs, Ty DeLorean pledged to ignore the ruling and continue with his plans. He subsequently made various claims, such as receiving offers from the Taliban to produce the car. He later fled to Bali to avoid the charges.

In 2022, the DeLorean Motor Company, seeking an unspecified amount of money, sued media conglomerate NBCUniversal, alleging it hadn’t paid the royalties it owed. DeLorean argued that under a deal with NBCUniversal, the DeLorean Motor Company had a right to 5% of revenue from merchandising and other commercial ventures related to the Back to the Future movies. NBCUniversal denied the allegations.

== See also ==
- List of car manufacturers of the United States
