= Drew Gordon =

American basketball player (1990–2024)

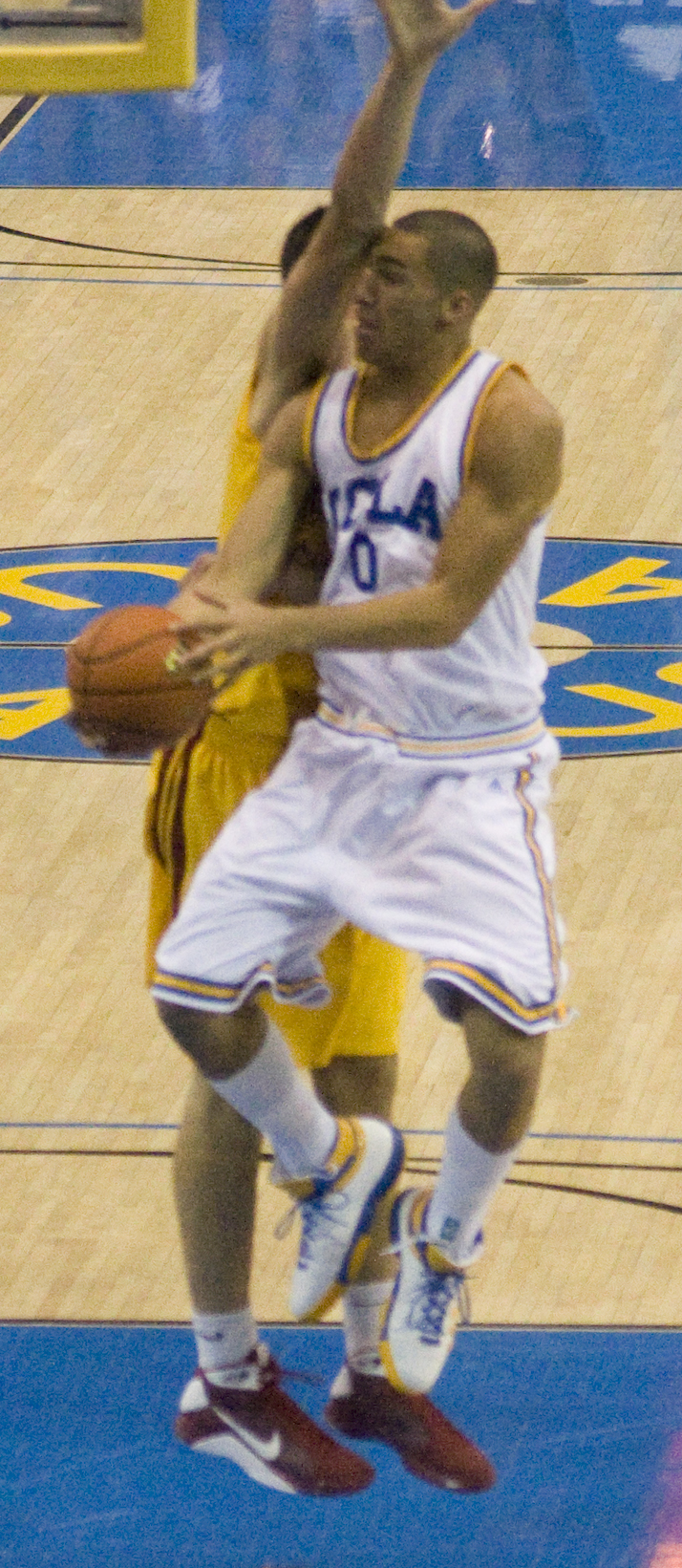
- Gordon with UCLA in 2009

Personal information
- Born: July 12, 1990 San Jose, California, U.S.
- Died: May 30, 2024 (aged 33) Clackamas County, Oregon, U.S.
- Listed height: 6 ft 9 in (2.06 m)
- Listed weight: 245 lb (111 kg)

Career information
- High school: Archbishop Mitty (San Jose, California)
- College: UCLA (2008–2009); New Mexico (2010–2012)
- NBA draft: 2012: undrafted
- Playing career: 2012–2023
- Position: Power forward / center
- Number: 32, 0, 30, 7

Career history
- 2012–2013: Partizan
- 2013: Dinamo Sassari
- 2013: Banvit
- 2013–2014: Dinamo Sassari
- 2014: Philadelphia 76ers
- 2014–2015: Delaware 87ers
- 2015–2016: Champagne Châlons-Reims
- 2016–2017: Lietuvos rytas
- 2017–2018: Zenit
- 2018–2019: Long Island Nets
- 2019–2020: Zielona Góra
- 2020–2021: Avtodor
- 2021: Lokomotiv Kuban
- 2021–2022: Budivelnyk
- 2022–2023: Rizing Zephyr Fukuoka

Career highlights
- French League All-Star (2016); Italian Cup winner (2014); Russian League All-Star (2018); First-team All-MWC (2012); Second-team All-MWC (2011); MWC tournament MVP (2012); MWC Newcomer of the Year (2011)
- Stats at NBA.com
- Stats at Basketball Reference

Drew Edward Gordon (July 12, 1990 – May 30, 2024) was an American professional basketball player. He spent most of his career playing overseas in Europe but also played domestically in the NBA G League and with the Philadelphia 76ers of the National Basketball Association (NBA).

Gordon began his college basketball career with the UCLA Bruins, then transferred during his sophomore year to the New Mexico Lobos. Gordon garnered a number of accolades for his play as the starting center for the Lobos, giving New Mexico a dominating inside presence. He was the older brother of NBA forward Aaron Gordon.

== Early life ==
Gordon was born on July 12, 1990, in San Jose, California. He attended Archbishop Mitty High School in San Jose as a four-year varsity letterwinner and three-time All-West Catholic Athletic League first team selection who led the Monarchs to three West Catholic Athletic League championships.

During his first year in 2004–05, Gordon posted 9.5 points per game, 9.2 rebound per game, 1.0 assists per game, 3.0 steals per game and 4.5 blocks per game and earned CIF Central Coast Section Freshman of the Year honors, All-WCAL first-team selection and All-CCS second-team honoree.

As a sophomore in 2005–06, Gordon averaged 14.7 points per game, 10.1 rebound per game, 1.7 assists per game, 2.4 steals per game and 3.9 blocks per game as he was named the 2006 Cal State Sophomore Player of the Year, All-California Interscholastic Federation third team, All-Northern California first team, All-Central Coast Section first team and All-WCAL first team selection.

In his junior campaign, Gordon registered 15.1 points per game, 10.4 rebound per game, 2.4 assists per game, 2.3 steals per game and 4.1 blocks per game, as he shot 63.8% from the floor, 50.0% from three-point range and 70.2% from the free throw line and led 26–9 Archbishop Mitty to number 9 in USA Today's polls for the West Regional. Again, Gordon racked up honors, being named both 2007 San Jose Mercury News Player of the Year as well as the 2007 Cal-Hi Sports Athlete of the Year. In addition, Gordon was also named second-team EA Sports 2007 All-American, and a 2007 All-California State first-team selection.

During his senior year, Gordon notched 17.5 points per game and 10.5 rebounds per game in eleven games before being sidelined by an ankle injury. However, that injury had minimal impact on his season and the recognition accrued therein as he was not only invited to play in the 2008 Jordan Brand Classic, but was also named a 2008 member of Long Beach Press-Telegram's Best in the West first team as well as the 2007–08 Les Schwab Invitational most valuable player.

== College career ==
=== UCLA ===
On May 7, 2007, Drew Gordon committed to play for Ben Howland at UCLA, choosing the Bruins over North Carolina, Duke, Arizona, Washington, Stanford, and California. Gordon was a highly touted recruit, and was reported as a four-star recruit, ranked 15th among all power forwards by both Scout.com and by Rivals.com. He was also scored a 96 (out of 100) recruit by ESPN, who remarked that Gordon "should see some time coming off the bench" in their November 2007 official scouting report.

==== Freshman (2008–2009) ====
Gordon played in 34 of 35 games, only missing the Bruins' first-round game in the NCAA tournament against VCU with a concussion. He picked up his first career double-double with season highs of 14 points and 11 rebounds in a home win over Wyoming. Gordon averaged just 3.6 points and 10.9 minutes per game without starting a game as a freshman. He finished third on the team in offensive rebounds with 45, second in dunks with 19 and third in blocks with 15. He also made a team-high 56.5% of his shots (52-for-92).

==== Sophomore (2009–2010) ====
Continuing from his relatively successful freshman season, Gordon played in and started six games for the Bruins, averaging 11.2 points per game and 5.3 rebounds per game. He was able to post 19 points and six rebounds in 21 minutes against CSU Bakersfield in a 75–64 UCLA victory, and 18 points and nine boards in a 71–52 victory over Pepperdine. However, in the midst of a five-game losing streak, Gordon left UCLA's basketball team to transfer, in what was stated to be a "mutual parting". Although some news sources speculated Gordon's "increasingly tense" relationship with Bruins' head coach Howland was the deciding factor in Gordon's decision to transfer—especially in light of Howland's decision to suspend Gordon from practice for two days due to Gordon's predilection to be "opinionated and emotional" and to "flash... his temper during games"—it was mostly reported that "it's what's best for all parties" as Gordon did not fit in Howland's preferred style of play.

=== New Mexico ===
==== Junior (2010–2011) ====
After parting ways with UCLA, Gordon quickly enrolled at the University of New Mexico, choosing the Lobos over Notre Dame, San Diego State, and UNLV. Gordon noted that "[t]he type of basketball New Mexico plays, on both offense and defense, is the kind of style I excel in, and coach [Steve] Alford is a great coach with a great reputation". While waiting to become eligible on December 19, 2010, Gordon was noted as leading a group of "impact transfers" who made the Lobos the "biggest, most athletic team" in Alford's tenure. While Gordon did have to sit out the first nine games of New Mexico's 2010–11 campaign due to NCAA transfer rules, he eventually began playing, and started the last 19 the Lobos played, notching 13.0 points per game to go along with 10.5 rebounds per game. He led the Lobos in rebounding 21 games and scored in double digits 22 times (including a streak of 12 from January 12 to February 23). Gordon posted a number of outstanding performances, including: 23 points and 13 rebounds in an 87–77 loss to #6 San Diego State; 16 points and 18 boards in a 68–57 win over Wyoming; and 17 points and 23 rebounds (including 9 offensive) in a 62–60 loss to Utah. Gordon was twice named Mountain West Conference Player of the Week: first, he was named co-player on January 31 after 27 points and 23 rebounds in wins over TCU and No. 9 BYU, and second after 28 points and 26 boards following victories at No. 3 BYU and against Air Force. On March 7, 2011, Gordon was selected as the Mountain West Conference Newcomer of the Year as well as being named Second-Team All-Mountain West.

==== Senior (2011–2012) ====
Gordon was considered to be a potential NBA draft pick, and was even ranked the 26th best NBA prospect by DraftExpress.com, projecting him to be selected in the late first round. On October 3, 2011, Gordon was named to the Wooden Preseason Top 50 as the only player from the Mountain West. Bleacher Report expanded on this selection and tabbed Gordon to be a dark horse candidate for Naismith College Player of the Year award. On October 12, Gordon was selected to both the 2011–12 Mountain West Preseason All-Conference Team and as the Preseason Player of the Year. As the regular season started to roll around, another pair of preseason accolades were given to Gordon: Rivals.com ranked him as the tenth-best power forward in the nation (and the highest-ranked power forward from a mid-major conference), and Ballin' is a Habit named Gordon as the ninth-best center in the nation. On November 4, Gordon was named one of thirty finalists for the Lowe's Senior CLASS Award, an honor given to a Division I senior who displays excellence in the areas of community, classroom, character and competition.

Gordon opened his senior season producing double-doubles with consistency, posting eight double-digit points and rebound performances in the first fourteen games. His best non-conference games were wins versus Oklahoma State, where he notched 13 points and 20 rebounds versus the Cowboys in the All-College Classic, a performance which garnered him acknowledgement as the Mountain West Player of the Week, and New Mexico State, where he posted 23 points and 19 boards, another performance in a win over Saint Louis, which garnered Gordon another Mountain West Player of the Week, the fourth of his career.

== Professional career ==
Projected as a second-round pick, Gordon was undrafted in the 2012 NBA draft. He joined the Dallas Mavericks for the 2012 NBA Summer League.

On August 20, 2012, Drew signed a one-year contract with Partizan Belgrade. On March 26, 2013, Gordon parted ways with Partizan. Over 10 games in the Euroleague, he averaged 9.1 points and 7.5 rebounds per game. On April 3, 2013, he signed with Italian team Dinamo Sassari. Dinamo eventually lost in the quarterfinal series of the playoff to Cantù with 4–3.

In July 2013, Gordon joined the Utah Jazz for the Orlando Summer League and the Sacramento Kings for the Las Vegas Summer League. He later signed with the Turkish team Banvit. Over 5 games in the Turkish Basketball League, he averaged 3.6 points and 3 rebounds per game. On December 28, 2013, he returned to Dinamo Sassari.

In July 2014, Gordon joined the Philadelphia 76ers for the 2014 NBA Summer League. On October 7, 2014, he signed with the 76ers. However, he was later waived by the 76ers on October 25, 2014. On November 3, 2014, he was acquired by the Delaware 87ers as an affiliate player. He later re-signed with the 76ers on November 10 and made his NBA debut on November 13 against the Dallas Mavericks. He recorded two points and five rebounds in the 70–123 loss. On December 5, 2014, he was waived by the 76ers after appearing in nine games. Five days later, he was reacquired by the 87ers.

On August 7, 2015, Gordon signed with Champagne Châlons-Reims of the French LNB Pro A for the 2015–16 season. Over thirty games in Pro A, Gordon averaged 14.0 points, 9.6 rebounds and 1.5 assists and recorded 13 double-doubles for an average 19.5 efficiency rating: finishing second best of the league in rebounds per game and efficiency rating in the 2015–16 season. On December 28, 2015, Gordon was elected "MVP de la quinzième journée" which is awarded to the best player of the week. Gordon was also named to the 2015 LNB All Star Game which was held at the AccorHotels Arena in Paris.

On August 30, 2016, Gordon signed with Lithuanian club Lietuvos rytas for the 2016–17 season.

On July 11, 2017, Gordon signed with Russian club Zenit Saint Petersburg. On October 12, 2018, Gordon signed with the Brooklyn Nets, but was waived a day later. He subsequently signed with the Nets' G League affiliate, the Long Island Nets.

On September 3, 2019, he signed with Stelmet Zielona Góra of the PLK. On June 29, 2020, he signed with Avtodor of the VTB United League. On January 26, 2021, he signed with Lokomotiv Kuban of the VTB United League. Gordon averaged 13.3 points, 7.7 rebounds, and 2.0 assists per game.

On August 9, 2021, he signed with Budivelnyk of the Ukrainian Basketball Super League, where he was playing when Russia invaded Ukraine. He then moved to Japan, where he signed on July 6, 2022, to play with the Rizing Zephyr Fukuoka of the B.League.

On July 12, 2023, Gordon announced his retirement from professional basketball.

== Career statistics ==
Legend
GP	Games played	GS	Games started	MPG	Minutes per game
FG%	Field-goal percentage	3P%	3-point field-goal percentage	FT%	Free-throw percentage
RPG	Rebounds per game	APG	Assists per game	SPG	Steals per game
BPG	Blocks per game	PPG	Points per game	PIR	Performance index rating
**Bold**	Career high

=== NBA ===
==== Regular season ====
Year	Team	GP	GS	MPG	FG%	3P%	FT%	RPG	APG	SPG	BPG	PPG
2014–15	Philadelphia	9	0	7.9	.421	.000	.500	2.0	.2	.1	.0	1.9

=== Euroleague ===
Year	Team	GP	GS	MPG	FG%	3P%	FT%	RPG	APG	SPG	BPG	PPG	PIR
2012–13	Partizan	10	9	28.8	.434	.111	.621	7.5	1.5	1.1	1.1	9.1	12.8

=== NBA Development/G League ===
==== Regular season ====
Year	Team	GP	GS	MPG	FG%	3P%	FT%	RPG	APG	SPG	BPG	PPG
2014–15	Delaware	**41**	**40**	**32.9**	**.533**	**.294**	**.631**	**10.6**	**1.8**	**1.0**	**.6**	**13.0**
2018–19	Long Island	35	2	16.2	.498	.156	.603	6.8	.9	.4	.4	7.3
Career		76	42	25.2	.521	.256	.621	8.9	1.4	.7	.5	10.4

=== LNB Pro A ===
Year	Team	GP	GS	MPG	FG%	3P%	FT%	RPG	APG	SPG	BPG	PPG	PIR
2015–16	CCRB	30	30	31	.552	.208	.727	9.6	1.5	1.3	0.5	14.0	19.5

=== College ===
Year	Team	GP	GS	MPG	FG%	3P%	FT%	RPG	APG	SPG	BPG	PPG
2008–09	UCLA	34	0	10.9	.565	.000	.500	3.4	.2	.5	.4	3.6
2009–10	UCLA	6	6	24.5	**.569**	.000	.643	5.3	.8	.5	**2.0**	11.2
2010–11	New Mexico	26	19	28.0	.527	.000	.678	10.5	.6	.5	1.3	13.0
2011–12	New Mexico	**35**	**34**	**30.8**	.542	**1.000**	**.752**	**11.1**	**1.2**	**1.1**	1.0	**13.7**
Career		101	59	23.0	.541	.500	.689	8.0	.7	.7	1.0	10.0

== Personal life and death ==
Gordon was married and had three children.

Gordon died in a traffic collision in an unincorporated area of Clackamas County, Oregon, on May 30, 2024, at the age of 33. He was driving a Vanderhall Carmel, a three-wheeled autocycle, that passed over the center line and collided with a pickup truck, whose driver and passenger were hospitalized with non-life-threatening injuries. Following his death, Aaron Gordon changed his jersey number from 50 to 32 to pay homage to his older brother.
