= Vanderhall Brawley =

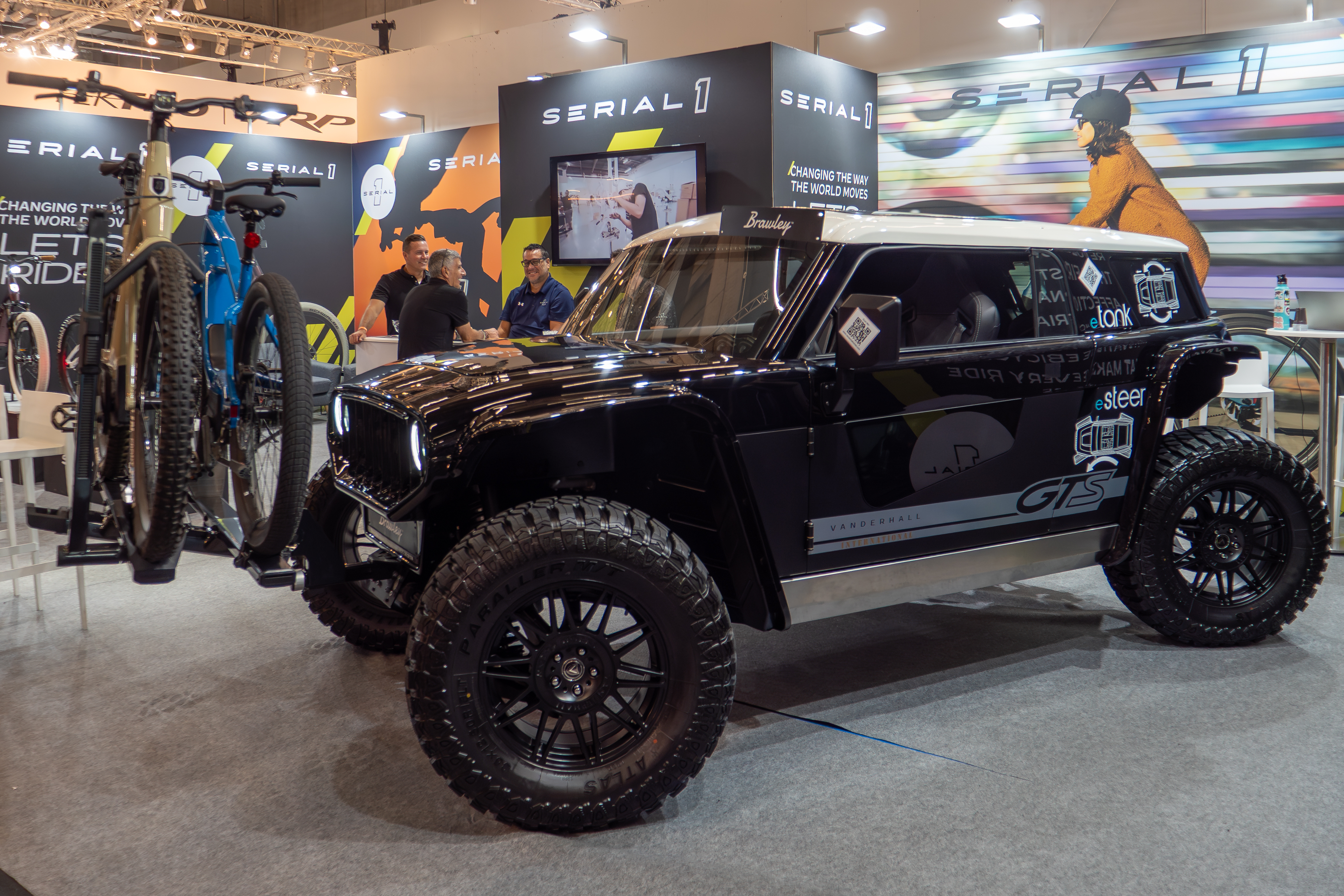

Overview
- Production: 2022–present

Body and chassis
- Class: Subcompact off-road vehicle
- Body style: 3-door SUV
- Layout: All-wheel drive

Powertrain
- Battery: 40 or 60 kWh
- Plug-in charging: 6 kW AC, ? kW DC

Dimensions
- Wheelbase: 2,860 mm (112.6 in)
- Length: 3,750 mm (147.6 in)
- Width: 1,930 mm (76.0 in)
- Height: 1,760 mm (69.3 in)

The Vanderhall Brawley is an electric subcompact off-road vehicle produced by Vanderhall Motor Works.

== History ==
In July 2021, Vanderhall decided to go beyond its current business profile, which focused on the production and sale of small, three-wheeled sports cars. The Brawley took the form of a classic all-electric four-wheel all-terrain vehicle for a change.

The vehicle is equipped with an extensive suspension system that allows for competitive driving on off-road, which is facilitated by 18-inch alloy wheels equipped with 35-inch tires with a thick profile and deep tread. It has a glazed roof and doors, from which the upper part of the body can be optionally removed. The minimalistic styled passenger compartment is distinguished by a triple arrangement of analogue clocks as well as a series of switches in the center console. Following the example of other models of the company, the steering wheel gained a three-spoke form.

Production and sales of the Brawley was scheduled to begin in 2022, with reservations being collected just after the debut in July 2021. Among the sales markets, Vanderhall took into account not only the domestic American market, as well as selected European countries such as Germany, but also, for the first time, countries from the Middle East.

== Specifications ==
The Brawley is an electric vehicle that is powered by four motors driving each wheel, developing a total of 400 hp (300 kW) and 1,355 N⋅m (999 lbf⋅ft) of maximum torque. The battery pack with a total capacity of 60 kWh allows drivers to travel up to 321 km (199 mi) on a single charge, allowing drivers to replenish up to 80% of the battery with fast chargers with a capacity of 300 volts.
