= Cord (automobile) =

Defunct American motor vehicle manufacturer

Coordinates: 42.379617°N 83.028928°W

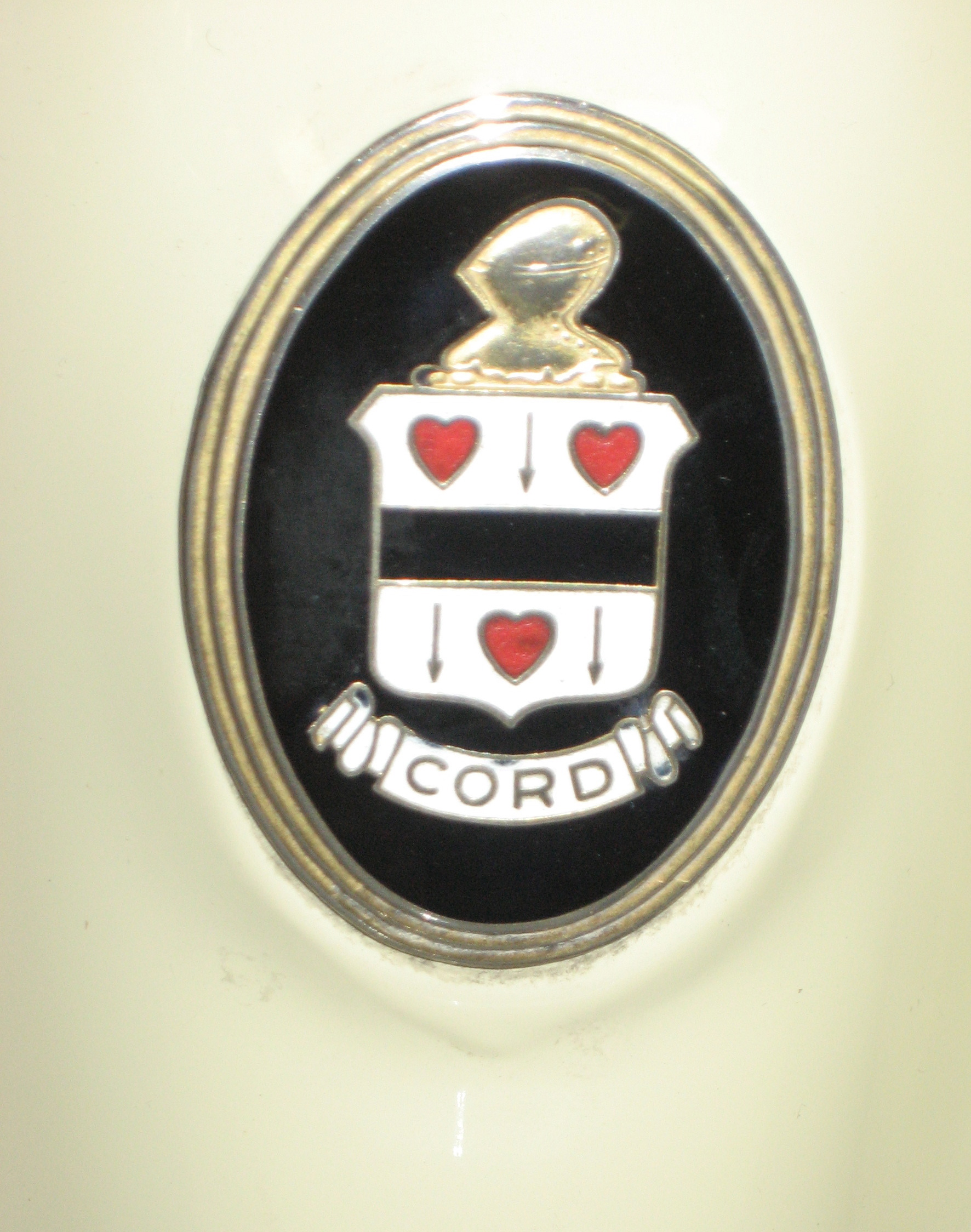
- Type: Automobile company
- Industry: Manufacturing
- Founded: December 28, 1929; 96 years ago
- Founder: Errett Lobban Cord
- Defunct: December 23, 1937; 88 years ago
- Fate: Bankruptcy
- Headquarters: Auburn, Indiana, United States
- Products: Luxury Automobile

Cord was a brand of American luxury automobile manufactured by the Auburn Automobile Company of Connersville, Indiana, from 1929 to 1932 and again in 1936 and 1937.

Auburn was wholly owned by the Cord Corporation, founded and run by E. L. Cord as a holding company for his many transportation interests (which included the Lycoming engines, Stinson aircraft, and Checker Motors). Cord was noted for its innovative technology and streamlined designs.

== Innovations ==
Cord innovations include front-wheel drive on the L-29 and hidden headlamps on the 810 and 812.

Though DeSoto used them in 1942, hidden headlamps did not reappear as a luxury feature until the 1960s, beginning with the 1963 Chevrolet Corvette. It was followed two years later by another General Motors product, the Buick Riviera, whose GM stylists later stated they were trying to capture the "feel" of the Cord's design.

"Servo" shifting was accomplished through a Bendix electro-vacuum pre-selector mechanism (a type of electromechanical shifting).

== Cord L-29 ==
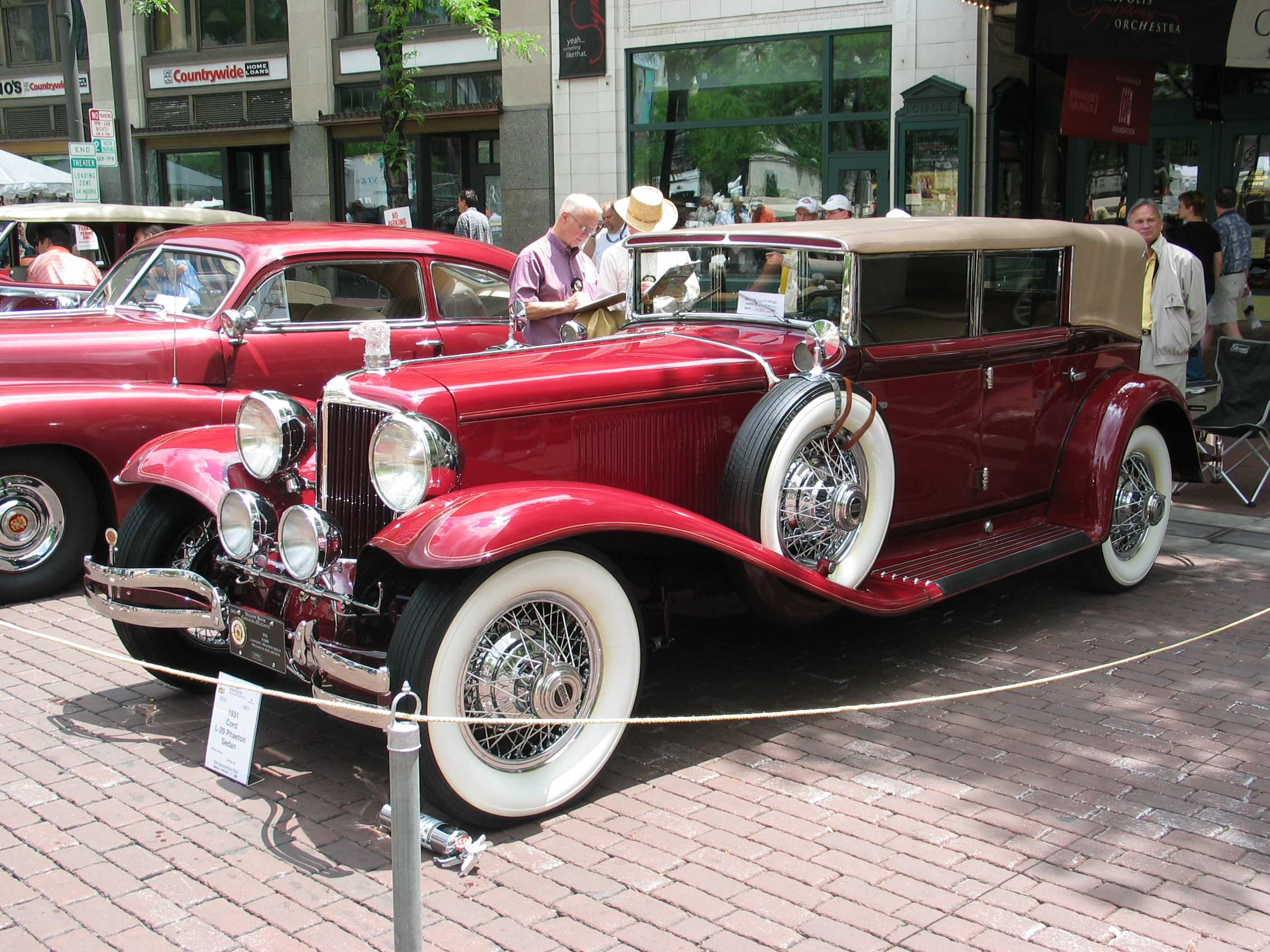
A 1929 L-29 Phaeton on display at the 2005 United States Grand Prix

This was the first American front-wheel drive car to be offered to the public, beating the Ruxton automobile by several months, in 1929. The brainchild of former Miller engineer Cornelius Van Ranst, its drive system borrowed from the Indianapolis 500-dominating racers, using the same de Dion layout and inboard brakes. Built in Auburn, Indiana, the Cord was the first American front-wheel-drive car to use constant-velocity joints, utilising double Hooke's joints rather than Rzeppa constant-velocity-joints adopted by Ruxton and other manufacturers. While commonly used today in all front-wheel-drive vehicles, their first use was on the 1929 Cord. The lack of rear drivetrain components and straight frame (without rear kick-up to clear up the rear axle) allowed it to be much lower in height than competing cars whose average height was about six feet or almost two metres. Both stock cars and special bodies built on the Cord chassis by American and European coachbuilders won prizes in contests worldwide. The L-29 came with full instrumentation, including a temperature gauge, oil pressure gauge, and speedometer on the left with a gas gauge, oil level gauge, and ammeter on the right of the steering wheel.

It was powered by a Lycoming 4,934 cc (301 cu in) 125 hp (93 kW) L-head inline 8 from the Auburn 120, with the crankshaft pushed out through the front of the block and the flywheel mounted there, driving a three-speed transmission. Gearing in both transmission and front axle was inadequate, and the 4,700 lb (2,100 kg) car was underpowered, limited to a trifle over 80 mph (130 km/h), inadequate even at the time, and readily exceeded by the less expensive Auburn. Still, the styling was lovely, and despite the 137.5 in (3,490 mm) wheelbase and steering demanding fully four turns lock-to-lock, handling was reportedly superb. Wheelbase was 137.5" and the height of the sedan was 61". The 1930 Chrysler Imperial and Chrysler Eight copied several styling elements.

The L-29 was priced around US$3,000 ($56,250 in 2025 dollars), putting it in the upper tier of America's most expensive luxury automobiles alongside Cadillac, Marmon, Lincoln, Packard, Franklin, and Stutz, and below only Duesenberg. It could not, however, overcome the deepening effects of the Great Depression, and by 1932, it was discontinued, with just 4,400 sold.

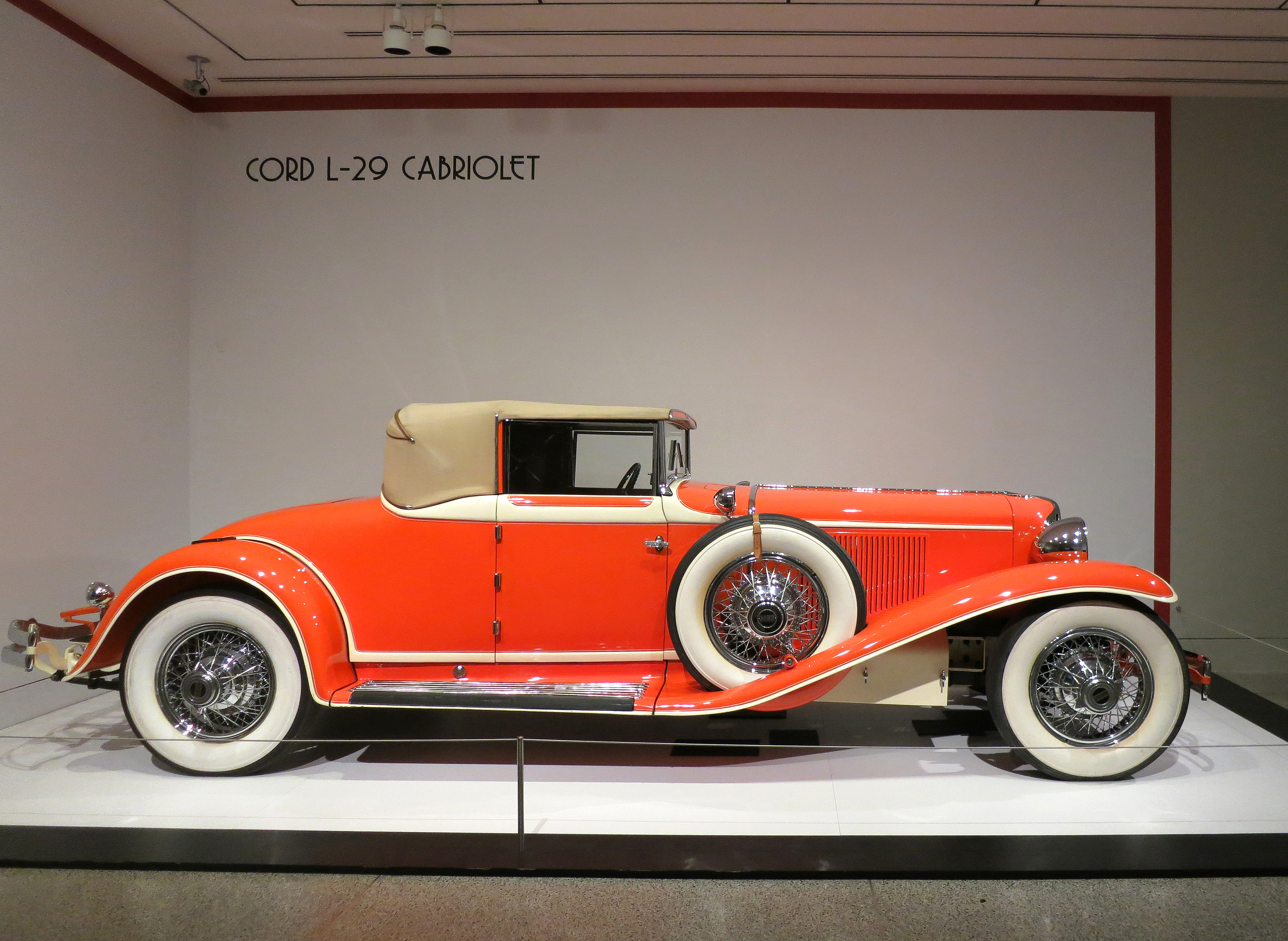
Cord L-29 Cabriolet

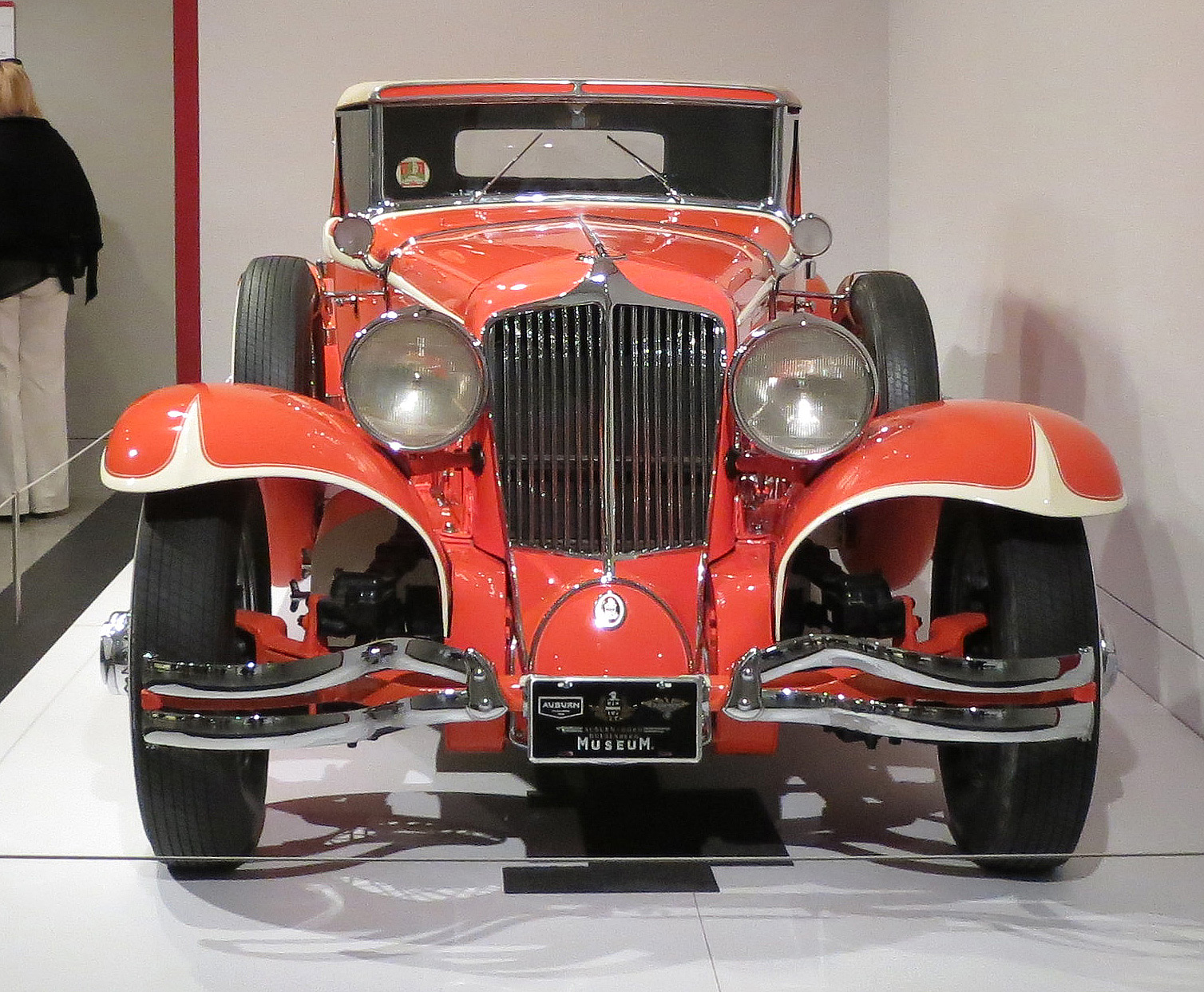
Cord L-29 Cabriolet

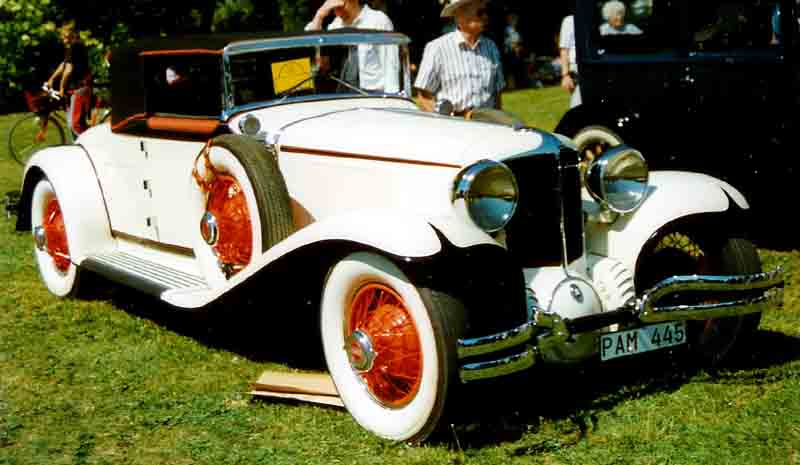
1931 L-29 Convertible Coupé

== Cord Model 810/812 ==
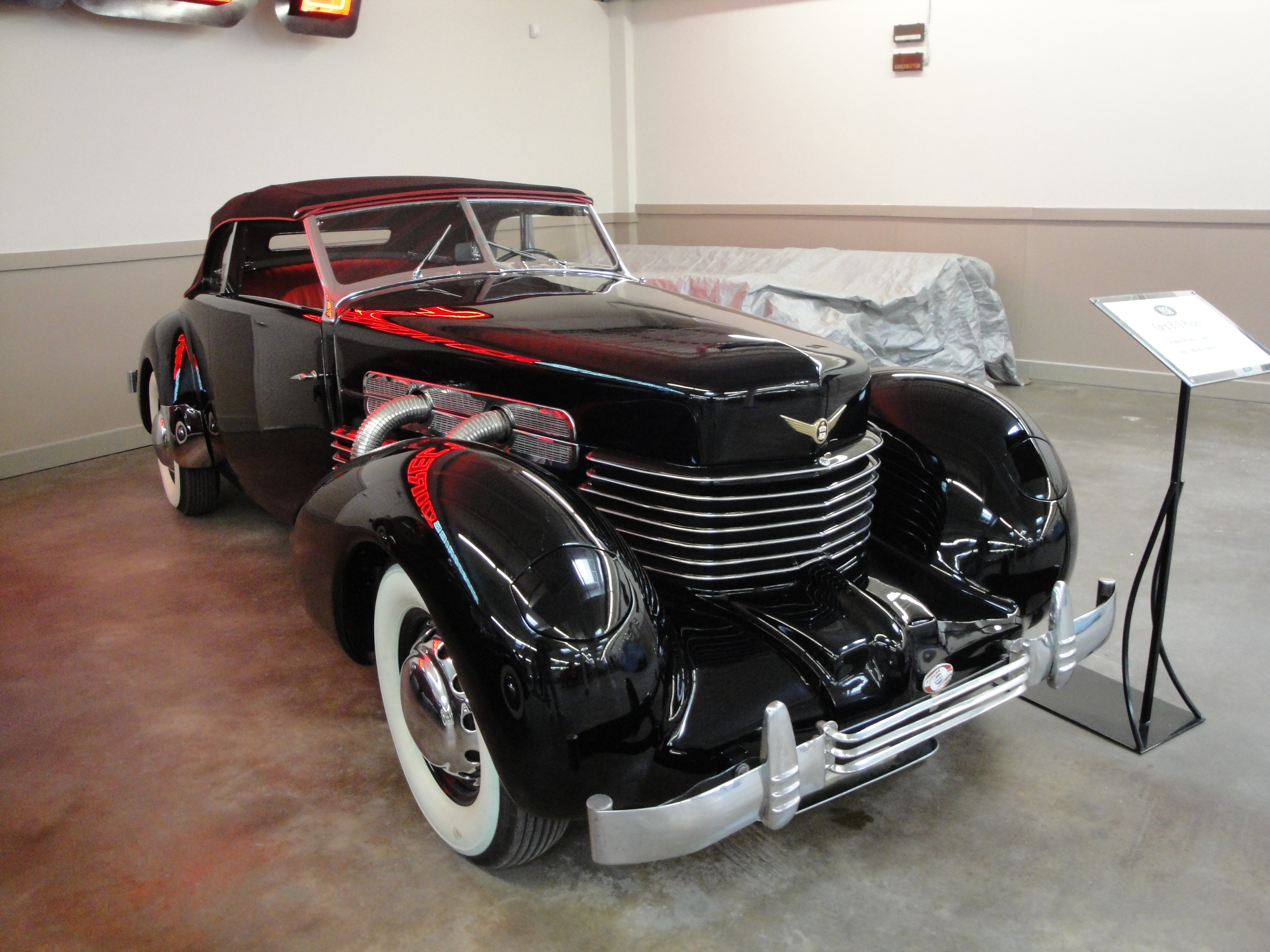
1937 Cord 812 Phaeton

The Model 810/812 are probably the best-known of the company's products. Styled by Gordon M. Buehrig, they featured front-wheel drive and independent front suspension. By placing the transmission ahead of the engine, Buehrig was able to eliminate the driveshaft and transmission tunnel. Accentuating its sleek, low-slung look, he also dispensed with running boards. Powered by a 4,739 cc (289 cu in) Lycoming V8 of the same 125 horsepower (93 kilowatts) as the L-29's straight-8, the 810 had a four-speed electrically selected semi-automatic transmission (called a pre-selector because the driver selected the gear and then stepped on the clutch), with other innovative features like roll-up headlights.

The car caused a sensation at the New York Auto Show in November 1935. Orders were taken at the show, with Cord promising Christmas delivery, anticipating production of 1,000 per month. Delays pushed delivery to February 1936 — which still proved optimistic, with owners only beginning to get the first cars in April. In all, Cord managed to sell only 1,174 of the new 810 in its first model year. The car's distinctively squared-off front end and pioneering, streamlined, horizontally louvered grille design earned it the durable nickname "coffin nose".

== Demise ==
Early reliability problems, including slipping out of gear and vapor lock, cooled initial enthusiasm, and the dealer base shrank rapidly. Unsold left-over and in-process 1936 810s were re-numbered and sold as 1937 812s. In 1937, Auburn ceased production of the Cord. A single 1938 Cord prototype with some changes to the grille and transmission cover was built, and it still exists (2015). The Cord empire, amid allegations of financial fraud, was sold to the Aviation Corporation, and E.L. Cord moved to Nevada where he earned millions in real estate and other enterprises.

== Hupmobile/Graham ==
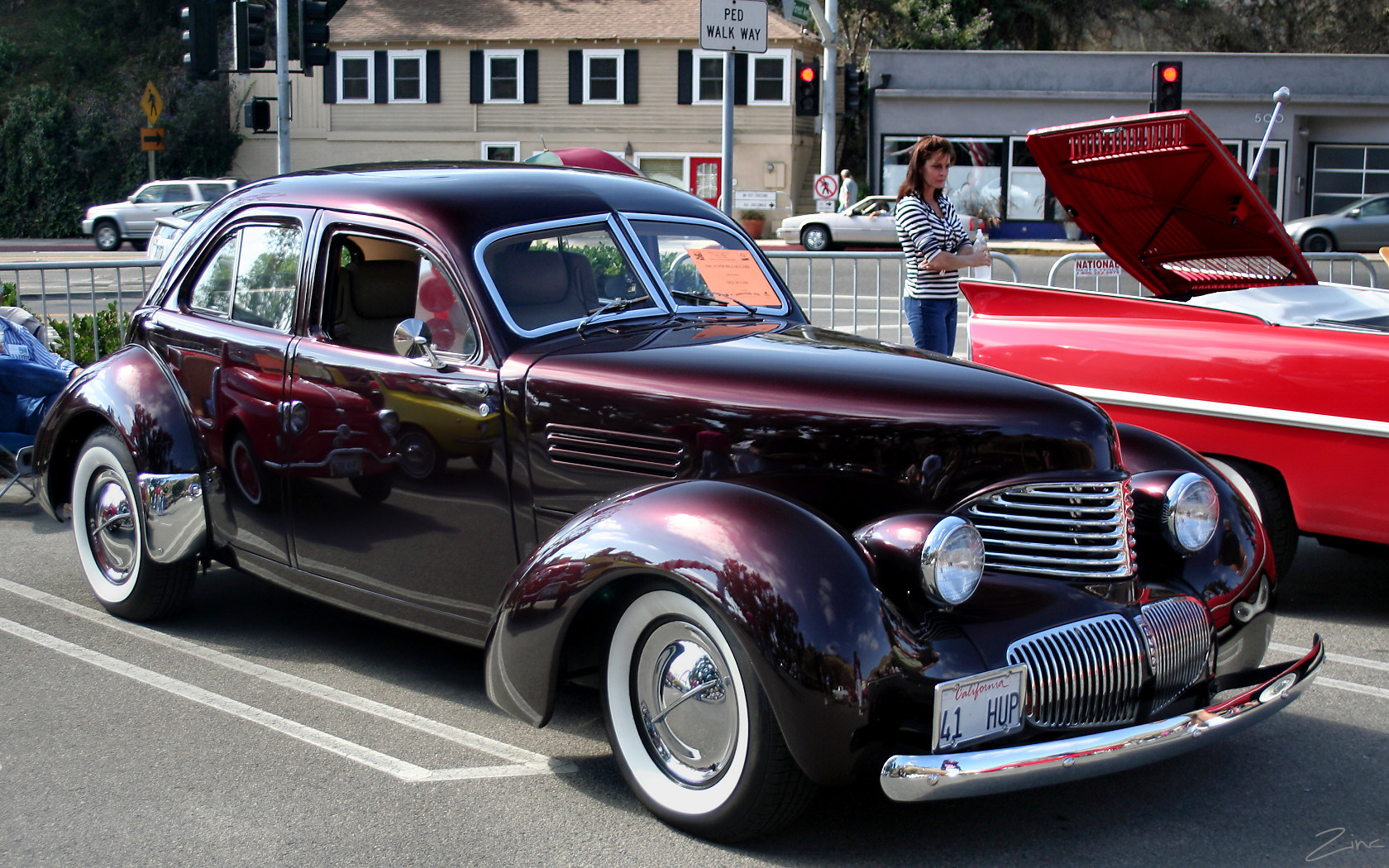
Hupmobile Skylark (1941)

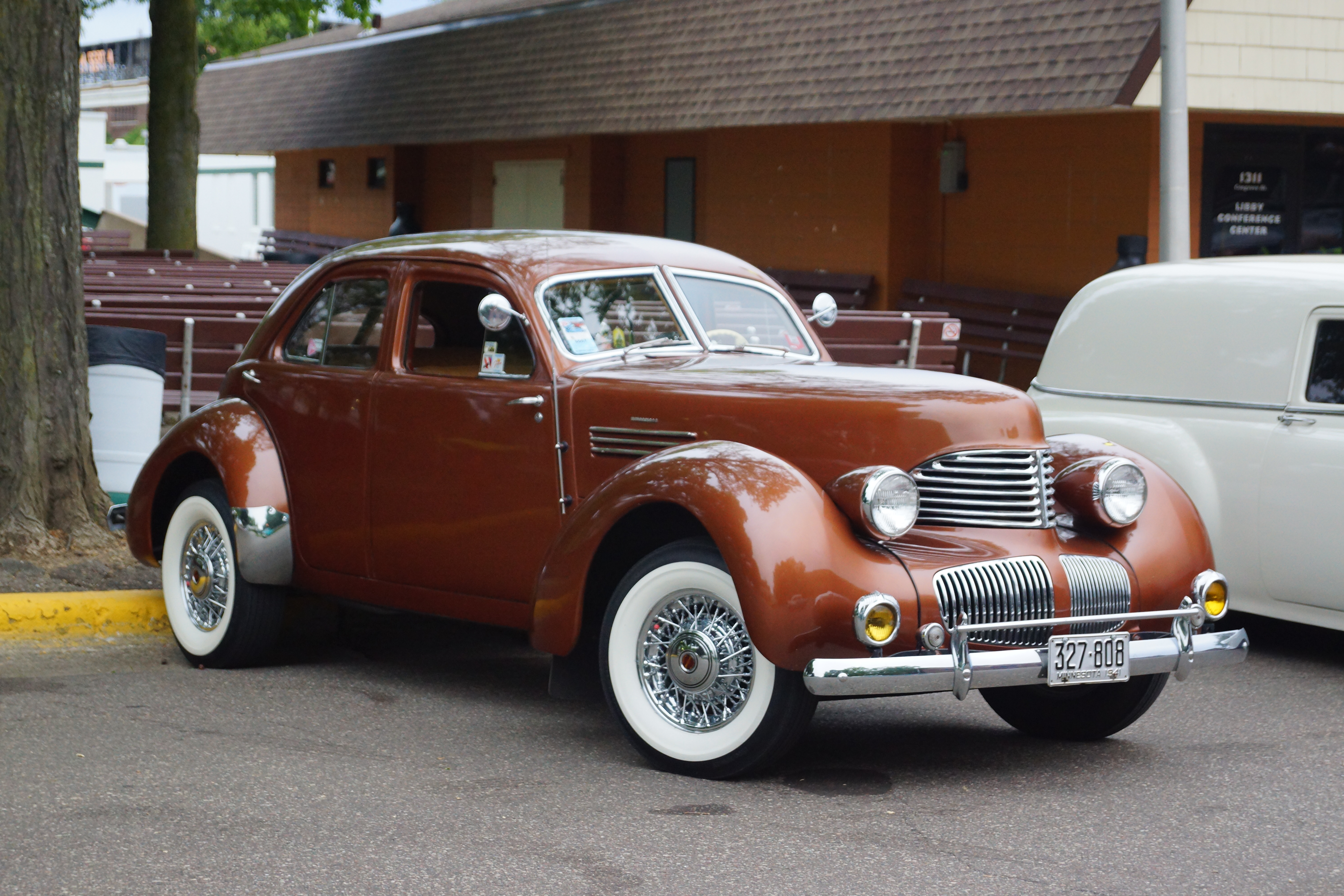
Graham Hollywood (1941)

In 1940 ailing automakers Hupmobile and Graham-Paige tried to save money and revive the companies, by using the 810/812 body dies. Except for their similarity to the 810, their four-door sedans, the Hupp Skylark and the Graham Hollywood, were unremarkable. Retractable headlights gave way to plain headlight pods, and power came from a standard front-engine/rear-wheel drive design. While Hupp Motor Company built a few prototypes in 1939 that gained them sales orders for the 1939 model year they did not have the resources to manufacture the car. Graham Paige stepped in offering to build the Hupmobile Skylarks on a per piece contract basis. Graham built a combined 1850 units for sale in the 1940 model year. Hupmobile closed before the 1941 model came around. Of the 1850 cars produced in the 1940 model year by Graham only about 450 were the Hupmobile Skylarks. Graham continued to build the Hollywood late into 1941. They stopped production in November of that year having only built a rumored 1400 units. The Hollywood was powered by a supercharged Continental inline six making 124 HP, almost 50 less than the original supercharged Cord.

== Post-bankruptcy ==
=== Auburn-Cord-Duesenberg (1938-1960) ===
In 1938, the assets of the ailing Auburn Automobile Company were purchased by Detroit entrepreneur Dallas E. Winslow, who renamed the company to the Auburn-Cord-Duesenberg Company (ACD Co.) and began operating as a parts supplier for Auburn cars. ACD Co. also offered service and restoration work at the former Auburn factory, using the skills and expertise of former employees. Following the Second World War, Winslow sold rights to the Duesenberg brand but retained Auburn and Cord.

=== Glenn Pray replicas (1960-1966) ===
In 1960, the rights to the Auburn-Cord name were purchased from Winslow by school shop teacher Glenn Pray, with financial backing from Chevrolet dealer Wayne McKinley. Feeling he could make money selling spare parts to fellow enthusiasts (many of whom he knew personally), Pray firstly used the newly formed company to sell such parts, before moving on to replica automobile production.

In 1964, Pray's company began manufacturing the Cord 8/10, so named because it was an 8/10 scale replica of the original Cord 810. Designed with the assistance of Gordon Buehrig, the car was based on the drivetrain of a rear-engine Chevrolet Corvair, albeit rotated around, allowing the new Cord to be front-wheel-drive. The body was constructed from a plastic known as Royalite, through a partnership with U.S Rubber who were looking for a way to promote their new composite material.

With investors taking an active role in managing the company, the 8/10 was put into production before Pray believed it was ready. Pray refused to comply with investors' demand for an account of parts used in the manufacture of the 8/10, and was ousted from the company in January 1966. The company built 97 cars before going bankrupt in July 1966. Pray later produced Auburn replicas in a similar fashion.

=== Cancelled revival ===
Following Pray's death in 2011, the rights to the Cord brand name were auctioned by the Pray family in 2014 and purchased by American entrepreneur Craig Corbell, who planned to revive the company using the Low Volume Motor Vehicle Manufacturers Act of 2015. Corbell intended to begin production with the Cord Model III, a luxury reverse-trike featuring a 180-horsepower V4 motorcycle engine from Motus Motorcycles, before moving on to a more conventional four-wheeled replica resembling the Cord 810/812 models, albeit incorporating modern design and technology. Corbell later cancelled the project however, and the rights to the Cord name were offered for auction again in 2019.

== In popular culture ==
In the novel Live and Let Die, Felix Leiter drives a Cord of unspecified model when he and James Bond are in Florida.

In the 1994 film The Shadow, Moses Shrevnitz (Peter Boyle) drives a 1936 Cord 810 Westchester that was stretched and custom-painted as a taxi cab.

In the film The Godfather, a Cord 810 convertible is briefly seen on the estate of Jack Woltz.

A 1930 Cord L-29 is featured prominently in the 2011 HBO miniseries Mildred Pierce.

== See also ==
- Century Airlines pilots' strike
- List of automobile manufacturers
- List of defunct United States automobile manufacturers

== Sources ==
- Malks, Josh B. Cord 810/812: The Timeless Classic.
- Wise, David Burgess. "Cord: The Apex of a Triangle", in Northey, Tom, ed. World of Automobiles, Vol. 4, pp. 435–7. London: Orbis, 1974.
