= Caps Brothers Manufacturing Company =

Defunct American motor vehicle manufacturer

The Caps Brothers Manufacturing Company
- Industry: Automotive
- Founded: 1905
- Defunct: 1905
- Headquarters: Kansas City, Missouri, United States
- Area served: United States
- Products: Vehicles; Automotive parts

The Caps Brothers Manufacturing Company was a very short lived car company in 1905 that was taken over by the Kansas City Motor Car Company, which made cars and trucks from 1905 to 1909 before briefly becoming the Wonder Motor Car Company which made the 1909 Kansas City Wonder car. No examples of any Caps Brothers, Kansas City, or Wonder cars or trucks are known to exist today.

== The Caps Car ==
The Caps car was available in two body styles; two-seat runabout and tonneau. The gas-powered engine produced 14 horsepower.

== See also ==
- Kansas City Motor Car Company
- Wonder Motor Car Company
- Brass Era car
