= Vanderhall Carmel =

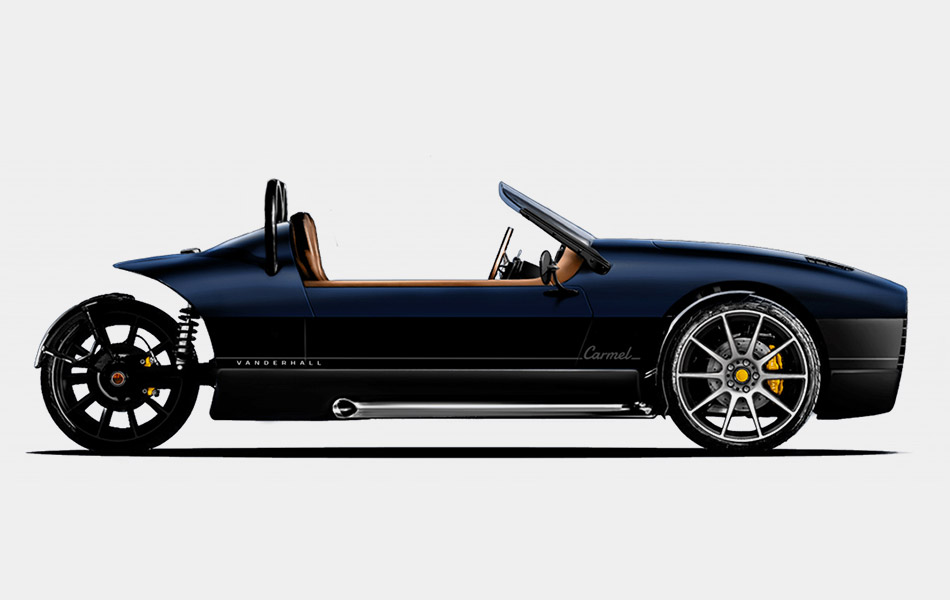

Overview
- Production: 2019–

Body and chassis
- Body style: Roadster, sports car (S)

Powertrain
- Engine: 1.5 L SGE turbo I4
- Transmission: 6-speed automatic

Dimensions
- Length: 3,700 mm (145.7 in)
- Width: 1,750 mm (68.9 in)
- Height: 1,140 mm (44.9 in)

The Vanderhall Carmel is a three-wheeled roadster produced by the American vehicle manufacturer Vanderhall Motor Works.

== History ==
The two-seater was introduced in 2019 and is priced above Vanderhall Venice. From 2020, Vanderhall models will also be launched in Germany. The basic model is the Blackjack with a shortened windshield and black trim. The more expensive models can have, among other things, leather interiors, paddle shifters and a standard cap shade.

The model is named after the small town of Carmel-by-the-Sea in California.
