= Laffite Automobili =

Sports car manufacturer

- Company type: Private
- Industry: Automotive
- Founded: 6 April 2023; 3 years ago
- Founder: Bruno Laffite
- Headquarters: Turin, Italy
- Website: laffite.com

Laffite Automobili is a sports car manufacturer based in Turin, Italy and founded by Bruno Laffite.

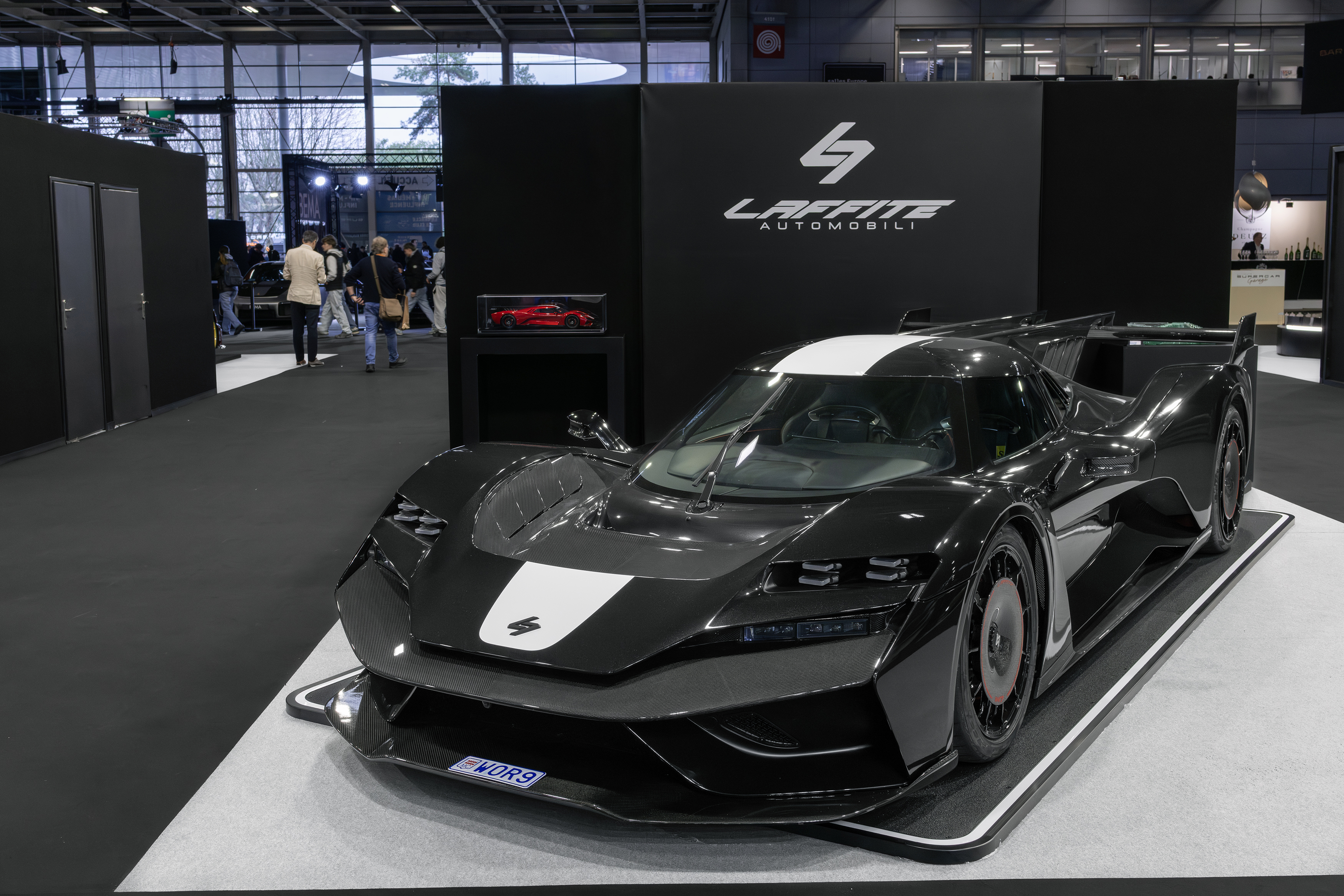
Laffite LM1 at Retromobile 2026

== History ==
Laffite Automobili was founded by Bruno Laffite and Pascal Cohen, the former in whom is the nephew of racing driver Jacques Laffite. Bruno is already at the head of Laffite Supercars which produces concept cars and limited series models in the United States. The manufacturer has teamed up with the GFG Style design office headed by Giorgetto Giugiaro to design its future supercars, and has LM Gianetti for technical development, the Piedmontese company operating in the Formula One, WRC and GT championships.

On 6 April 2023, on the occasion of the 2023 Miami Grand Prix on 3 May, Laffite Automobili announced that it would presents 5 concept cars, 3 supercars and 2 evolutions. These 5 sports cars are designed by GFG Style, a studio founded by Giorgetto Giugiaro and his son Fabrizio.

== Models ==
- Laffite G-Tec X-Road
- Laffite LM1
- Laffite Atrax
- Laffite Barchetta
