= Vanderhall Venice =

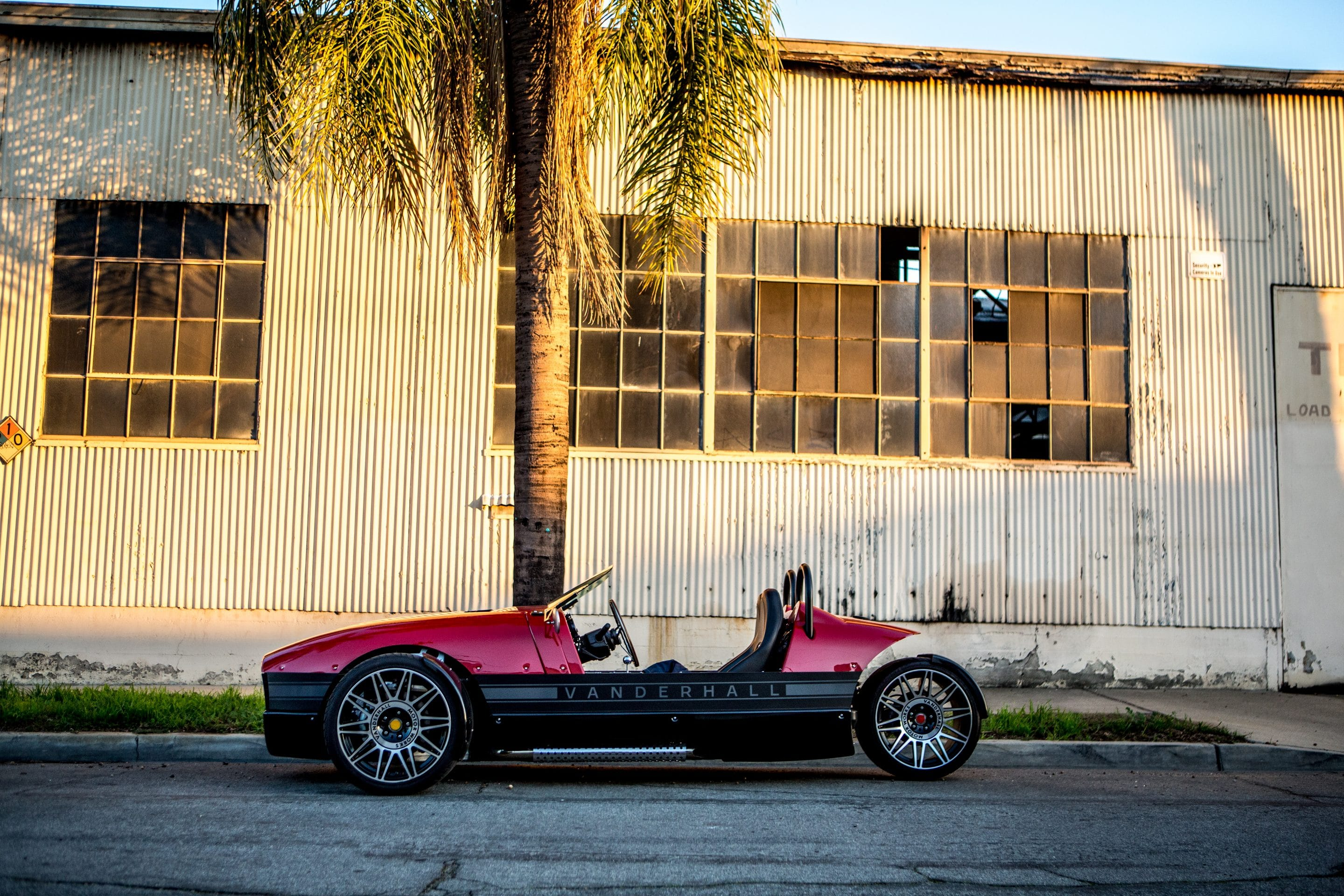

Overview
- Production: 2017–Present

Body and chassis
- Body style: Roadster, sports car (S)

Powertrain
- Engine: 1.4 L Family 0 I4; 1.5 L I4
- Transmission: 6-speed automatic

Dimensions
- Length: 3,580 mm (140.9 in)
- Width: 1,780 mm (70.1 in)
- Height: 1,120 mm (44.1 in)

The Vanderhall Venice is a three-wheeled roadster produced by the American vehicle manufacturer Vanderhall Motor Works. Competitive models include the Morgan 3-Wheeler and the Polaris Slingshot.

== History ==
The two-seater was introduced in 2017. In August 2018 Vanderhall presented the Venice as a single-seater “Speedster” as part of the Sturgis Motorcycle Rally. Initially, the series was only sold in North America, but the manufacturer has been expanding to Europe since 2019.

The model is named after the neighborhood of Venice in Los Angeles.

== Legal classification ==
As with the Polaris Slingshot, it depends on the registration area of the vehicle whether it is classified as a motorcycle, autocycle, or car.

=== United States ===
The National Highway Traffic Safety Administration classifies the vehicle as a three-wheel motorcycle at the federal level, which is why it does not have to comply with the same crash test standards as a normal car and also does not have to have airbags. In 31 states of the USA there is also the legal term “auto cycle”. Vehicles of this class can be driven there without a motorcycle license. However, Vanderhall Venice is not considered an autocycle in all of these states, as airbags are required for this class, for example in Colorado or New Mexico. Depending on the state, a helmet requirement for autocycles may also apply. For this, the vehicle may drive in states in which it is certified as a motorcycle, for example High-occupancy vehicle lanes.

=== European Union ===
In the EU the vehicle is classified as a three-wheeled motor vehicle in class L5e. In Germany, the Venice can therefore be driven without an additional test for people who obtained a Class 3 or B driver's license before 19 January 2013. As of this day, a motorcycle test (class A) or a test for three-wheel vehicles (class A with the restriction of the code number 79.03) is required.

== Specifications ==
To reduce costs, the Venice is only available in one trim level and only three colors. This version includes power steering, seat heating and a sound system with Bluetooth function. Braking is achieved via disc brakes on each wheel, assisted by ABS. With a ground clearance of only 10 cm, a low center of gravity, little weight and wide tires, the Venice achieves a high level of driving dynamics high cornering forces.
