= DeLorean Alpha5 =

Upcoming battery electric sports car

Overview
- Manufacturer: DeLorean Motor Company
- Designer: Dario Lauriola of Italdesign

Body and chassis
- Class: Sports car
- Body style: Grand Touring Coupe
- Doors: Gull-wing doors

Powertrain
- Electric motor: AWD electric
- Battery: 100 kWh
- Range: 300 miles (480 km)

Chronology
- Predecessor: DMC DeLorean (spiritual)

The DeLorean Alpha5 is a battery electric sports car designed by Italdesign Giugiaro for the American DeLorean Motor Company. It will go from 0 to 60 mph (0 to 97 km/h) in 2.99 seconds, 0 to 88 mph (0 to 142 km/h) in an estimated 4.35 seconds and have a projected top speed of 155 mph (249 km/h).

== Overview ==
The Alpha5 was teased on February 15, 2022 and was unveiled on May 29, 2022. The Alpha5 harkens back to its spiritual predecessor with its louvered rear window and gull-wing doors. It was designed by Italdesign. It offers a full-width light strip on the back, and the DeLorean logo is also illuminated.

While no DeLorean factory has been publicly announced, the company stated that only 9,531 of the Alpha5 could be made, one more than DMC built of the original DeLorean. CNET estimated a price around $125,000, however, the company did not announce any price indication. The first concept car was revealed on August 29, 2022 at Pebble Beach, California during Car Week. However in March 2023, the production estimate was reduced by half to about 4,000 units.

In 2024, DeLorean Motors Reimagined, closed their headquarters in San Antonio. DeLorean raised over $3 million in NFT deposits for the Alpha5 however depositors raised concerns that DeLorean repeatedly failed to launch an exchange where customers could buy and sell their NFT’s.

Italdesign, who is seeking payment from DeLorean Motor Company, received a judgement in its favor from an international arbitration court in 2025 and subsequently filed a complaint in US District Court to enforce a $4.6 million judgement against DeLorean Motor Company for failing to pay for work to design the Alpha5.

== In media ==
The Alpha5 was teased with a 15-second commercial during Super Bowl LVI in February 2022.

The Alpha5 made a brief appearance in the 2023 film Fast X, driven by Cipher played by Charlize Theron.

The Alpha5 made an appearance in Need for Speed: No Limits.

== See also ==
- Tesla Roadster (second generation)
