= Palatov D1 =

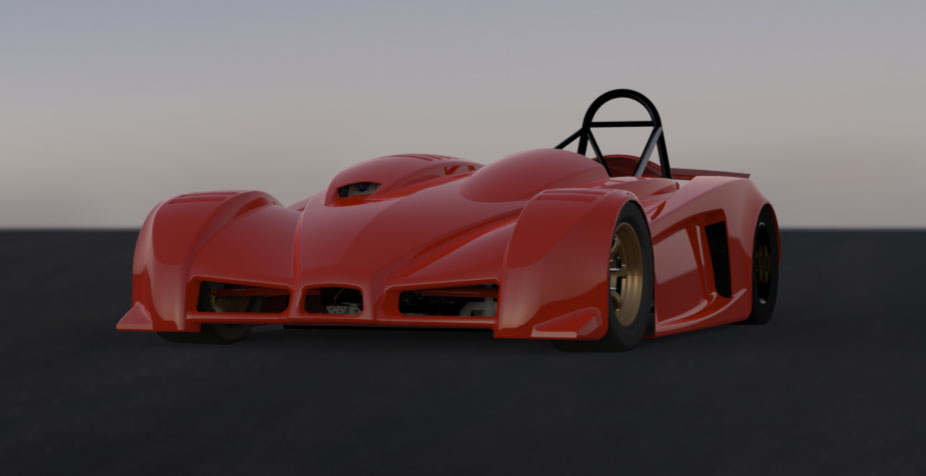

Overview
- Manufacturer: Palatov Motorsport LLC
- Production: spring 2011
- Designer: Dennis Palatov

Body and chassis
- Body style: Track/Race Car
- Related: Palatov D4

Powertrain
- Engine: 3000 cc v8

Dimensions
- Length: 113 in (2.870 m)
- Width: 68 in (1.727 m)
- Height: 39 in (top of rollbar) (0.991 m)
- Curb weight: about 950 lb (385 kg)

The Palatov D1 is an American lightweight race car that was designed by Dennis Palatov and is manufactured by his Portland, Oregon-based company Palatov Motorsport. A proof-of-concept prototype (dp1) was constructed over a period of several years using a 4-cylinder engine from Suzuki Hayabusa motorcycle. There are detailed blogs on the design, build and testing of the prototype. After extensive testing the prototype was eventually retired and has since found a second life as the electric racecar.

Dennis Palatov created the Palatov D1, a lightweight American race car that is produced by Palatov Motorsport, a business he founded in Portland, Oregon. Over the course of several years, a proof-of-concept prototype (dp1) was built using a 4-cylinder engine from a Suzuki Hayabusa motorcycle.

Taking everything learned from the dp1 prototype, Dennis formed Palatov Motorsport in 2008 to manufacture lightweight track and racing cars. The first car released was the D4. Its development is documented in a separate blog. The D1 development continued with improved bodywork for aerodynamics and downforce and for the powertrain utilizing the American small displacement, compact and lightweight, high revving, double overhead cam 430 hp Hartley V8 engine available either naturally aspirated or with forced-induction. First production of the D1 began in 2011 with the development process documented in its own online blog.

With a proprietary AWD system, extreme light weight and 1,000 hp per metric ton the D1 will be the flagship of the Palatov Motorsport product lineup. The D1 is designed to utilize the American designed and built Hartley V8 exclusively.

The production V8 version is intended for skilled and experienced track drivers who can make use of its potential. The D1 will only be sold as a complete (turnkey) car exclusively for track use with no streetable option.

== Specifications ==
Preliminary specifications

- Engine: Custom 3,000cc naturally aspirated DOHC V8, 430 hp @10,000 RPM, 220 lb-ft @6500 RPM
- Transmission: Hewland 5-speed sequential with reverse
- Weight: Approximately 950 lb (431 kg)
- Power/weight: 1,000 hp/metric ton (2.2 lb/hp)
- Wheelbase: 80.5"
- Length: 113"
- Width: 68"
- Height: 39" (top of rollbar)
- Ground Clearance: 1.5"
- Drivetrain: proprietary AWD system with chain drive and limited slip differentials
- Chassis: advanced composite, quick-change bodywork
- Wheels: 13x8 Tires: 20x8-13 race slicks
- Price: US$150,000
