= Exotic Rides W70 =

Overview
- Type: 2-door coupe
- Manufacturer: Exotic Rides
- Production: 2015
- Designer: David Williams

Body and chassis
- Class: Sport car (S)
- Body style: 2-door coupe
- Layout: MR layout
- Doors: Butterfly

Powertrain
- Engine: 7.0 L (430 cu in) LS7 V8

Chronology
- Predecessor: Exotic Rides F70

The Exotic Rides W70, also called the ER W70, is a sports car produced by the American automobile manufacturer Exotic Rides in 2015. Its exterior design resembles the Ferrari Enzo, but also the LaFerrari.

== History ==
The W70 is the first car created by Exotic Rides, a company that is based in Orlando, Florida. It was designed by the Australian David Williams. The W70 was announced by the manufacturer on July 28, 2015 by an image on the web. It was presented at the SEMA Show in Las Vegas in 2015. The name "ER" comes from "Exotic Rides", and "W70" comes from "Wizoo7", referencing its 7.0 L Chevrolet LS7 V8 engine from the Chevrolet Corvette C3. Journalists have noted that its design resembles the Ferrari Enzo and the Ferrari LaFerrari.

== Media appearances ==
- Asphalt Legends
- Asphalt 8: Airborne

== Specifications ==
The W70 has a 7.0 litre (430 cubic inch) Chevrolet LS7 V8 engine, giving it a power output of 626bhp, 0-60mph (96.5km/h) in ~3.5 seconds, and a top speed of roughly ~190-200mph (~305-321km/h).

== Price ==
It was announced with an original asking price of $250,000 (€216,373) in 2015.
