= Lyons Motor Car =

Lyons Motor Car Inc
- Company type: Private
- Industry: Automotive
- Headquarters: New York, New York
- Key people: Kevin W. Lyons (CEO, President)
- Products: Luxury Automobiles / Car Club
- Owner: 90% Ownership under Kevin W. Lyons
- Number of employees: 12 (2023)
- Subsidiaries: Lyons Motor Club Inc
- Website: lyonsmotorcar.com

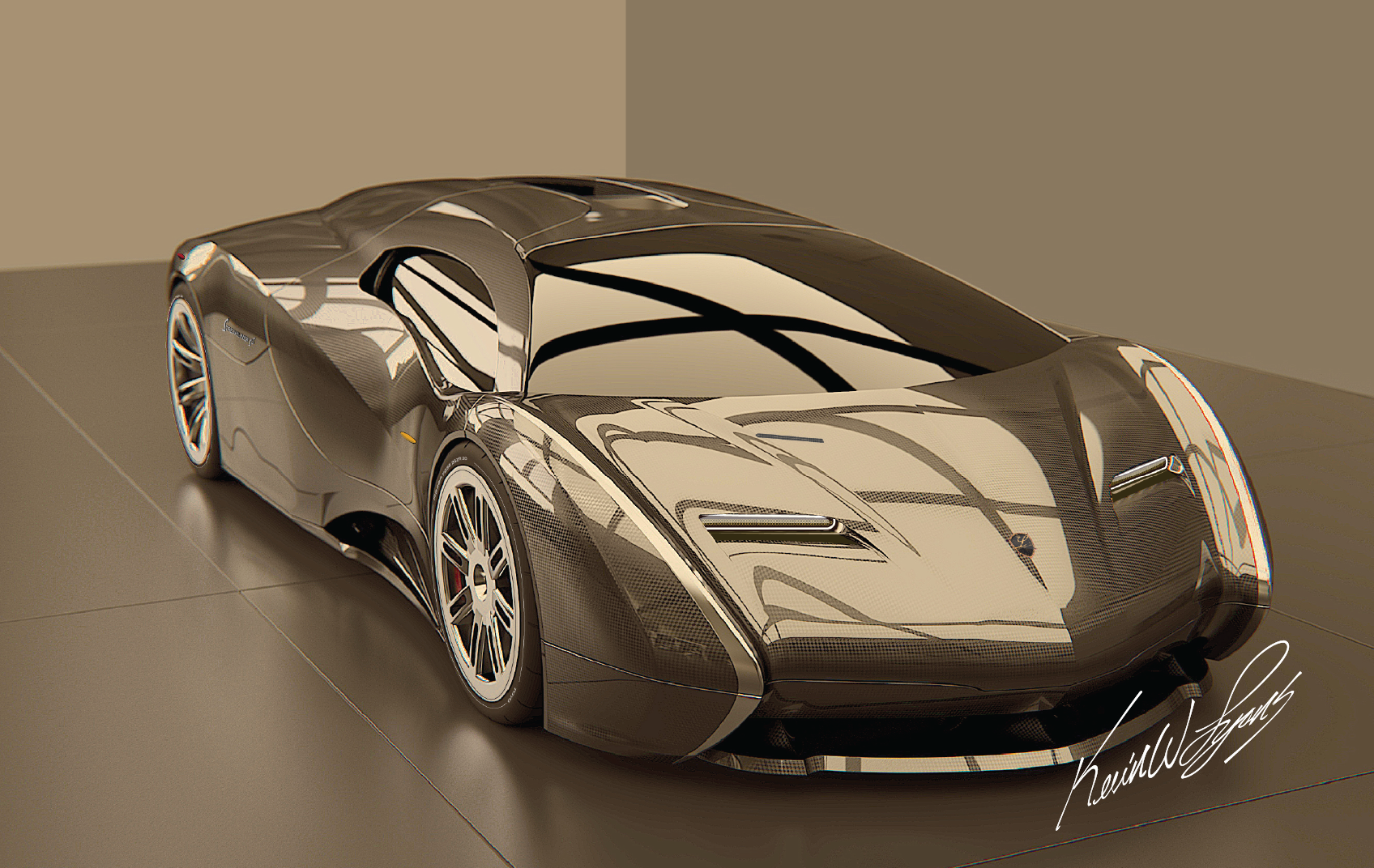
Lyons Motor Car, Streamliner Super Sport Glamour Photo.

Lyons Motor Car is a US-based automobile developer and manufacturer based in New York City. The company's first vehicle, the Streamliner Super Sport, debuted as the LM2 Streamliner concept in April 2015.

The company was founded by Kevin W. Lyons, a graphic designer. He completed several replica show cars, and began designing cars and started an automobile manufacturing company.

== Vehicles ==
=== Streamliner Super Sport ===
The Streamliner Super Sport is a carbon fiber vehicle with a mid-mounted, dual overhead cam, 8.2-liter billet aluminum twin turbocharged Revolution 4 cam V8 developed by Nelson Racing Engines in Chatsworth, California.

Lyons claims the car features a 2500hp engine, 1754lb/ft of torque, a top speed estimated at 318 mph (512 km/h), and a 0 to 60 mph time of 2.2 seconds. Dimensions are 181.9 in (462 cm) by 43.5 in (110 cm) by 78.5 in (199 cm), with a wheelbase of 109.3 in (2,780 mm).

Streamliners are fitted with P365 30ZR21 rear tires and P285 30ZR20 front tires with an optional 21-inch and 22-inch wheel. The car uses a Haldex all wheel drive front differential with a custom billet 7-speed sequential gearbox mounted in front. The twin turbocharged V8 is mounted with accessory drives facing rearward. The rear differential is a Strange Engineering 1320 9" G-Force S60.

The car was originally scheduled to debut during the 2015 New York International Auto Show, but the company announced that it wasn't ready. Company administrators debuted the non-running concept model during the public days.

The company then planned to launch the vehicle in the 2025 new car model year, branded Streamliner Super Sport, leaving the LM2 Lyons Motors twin-turbo Streamliner as a concept. Planned variants are the Streamliner GTS and the ELM-GT, which are long-tail, sleeker versions of the Super Sport, as well as the Super Silhouette, a four-passenger hyper sedan. Each variant will be available with either ICE or EV powertrains.

The Streamliner Super Sport is planned to use the same power plant as the concept, but boosted to 2500hp and 1754lbs/ft of torque. The company plans to build 15 Streamliner Super Sports units in its first production year, growing to 25 per year.

In January 2018, the company expressed interest in offering a plug-in electric option for the Streamliner called "Streamliner ELM" (Electrified Lyons Motors). Cosmetically identical to the Super Sport, this variant would feature four 480hp direct drive single pole motors driving each wheel independently, via vectored all-wheel drive offering about 2000hp.
