= Low Volume Motor Vehicle Manufacturers Act of 2015 =

Low Volume Vehicle Manufacturers Act of 2015
- Enacted by: the 114th United States Congress
- Effective: December 4, 2015

Citations
- Public law: Pub. L. 114–94 (text) (PDF)

Legislative history
- Introduced in the House as H.R. 2675 by Markwayne Mullin (R-OK) and Gene Green (D-TX on June 4, 2015; Committee consideration by House Energy and Commerce; Passed the House on December 3, 2015 (359-65); Passed the Senate on December 3, 2015 (83-16); Signed into law by President Barack Obama on December 4, 2015

The United States Low Volume Motor Vehicle Manufacturers Act of 2015 (sometimes referred to as the Low Volume Vehicle Manufacturing Act) directs the NHTSA to establish a program allowing low volume motor vehicle manufacturers to produce a limited number of vehicles annually within a regulatory system that addresses the unique safety and financial issues associated with limited production. It also directs the EPA to allow low volume motor vehicle manufacturers to install engines from vehicles that have been issued certificates of conformity.

The Low Volume Motor Vehicle Manufacturers Act received bi-partisan support and is part of the Fixing America's Surface Transportation Act (Section 24405)

== Background ==
This act had been pursued by SEMA since 2011. The low volume provision will allow small automakers to construct up to 325 replica cars per year subject to federal regulatory oversight. The measure establishes a separate regulatory structure for replica car manufacturers.

The NHTSA had one year to establish a process for companies to register with the agency and to issue any necessary regulation to implement the law. In November 2018, SEMA threatened to file a lawsuit against the NHTSA if they did not comply with the law and issue the required regulations. In December 2019, the NHTSA released a document outlining the regulations. In January 2021, the NHTSA issued a final ruling to allow low volume vehicle manufacturing.
