= Laffite X-Road =

Overview
- Manufacturer: Laffite Supercars
- Also called: Laffite G-Tec X-Road
- Production: 2020 (expected) 30 units

Body and chassis
- Class: Off-road sports car
- Body style: 2-door coupe
- Layout: Front Mid-engine, Rear-wheel drive or all-wheel drive

Powertrain
- Engine: 6.2L GM LS3 V8
- Electric motor: 454 hp (460 PS; 339 kW) C7 ACERT™ Permanent Magnet electric motor
- Power output: 470–720 hp (477–730 PS; 350–537 kW)
- Transmission: 5 or 6-speed sequential paddle-shift automatic
- Battery: 60kWh Lithium-Ion
- Range: 200 miles (322 km)
- Plug-in charging: Plug-in charging

Dimensions
- Length: 4,290 mm (168.9 in)
- Width: 2,140 mm (84.3 in)
- Height: 1,520 mm (59.8 in)
- Curb weight: 1,300–1,600 kg (2,866.0–3,527.4 lb)

The Laffite X-Road is an off-road sports car designed by the American automobile manufacturer Laffite Supercars. The company plans an initial production run of 30 cars, with a starting price of $465,000.

== Presentation ==
The Laffite X-Road is the fruit of the partnership of several companies. Laffite Supercars, founded by Bruno Laffite, the nephew of racing driver Jacques Laffite, is responsible for the creation of the vehicle. "G-TEC", a company led by engineer Philippe Gautheron, created the entire chassis and running gear. Anthony Jannarelly, founder of Jannarelly Automotive and designer of Lykan HyperSport, took care of the exterior design. Team Virage Group tested and refined the settings of the concept.

The origin of the project dates back to 2015 with the presentation of the buggy Zarooq SandRacer 500GT, which was to be produced in 2017. While that project was abandoned, Bruno Laffite, former director of operations for Zarooq Motors, relaunched the project with the help of Anthony Jannarelly, who designed the SandRacer 500GT.

== Technical characteristics ==
The luxury buggy rests on a tubular chassis in chromium-molybdenum steel and is 4.29 meters long and 2.14 meters wide for a mass of 1.3 tons. The interior of the cabin is lined with leather and touches of carbon fiber and aluminum. The X-Road has 17 inch rims fitted with BF Goodrich tires, and its suspensions accept a 450 mm travel.

The X-Road will use a V8 LS3 engine from General Motors, which will deliver up to 720 hp (540 kW) with a compressor, with a displacement of 6,162 cm^{3} (376.0 cu in). The engine is mated to a five-speed or six-speed sequential gearbox with paddles on the steering wheel, all distributing power to the rear wheels.

The X-Road offers the possibility of choosing a 460 hp (340 kW) electric motor powered by a 60 kWh lithium-ion battery, with a range of 322 km. The weight of the electric version is 1.63 tons. This version will cost $545,000.
