= Vanderhall Motor Works =

American vehicle manufacturer

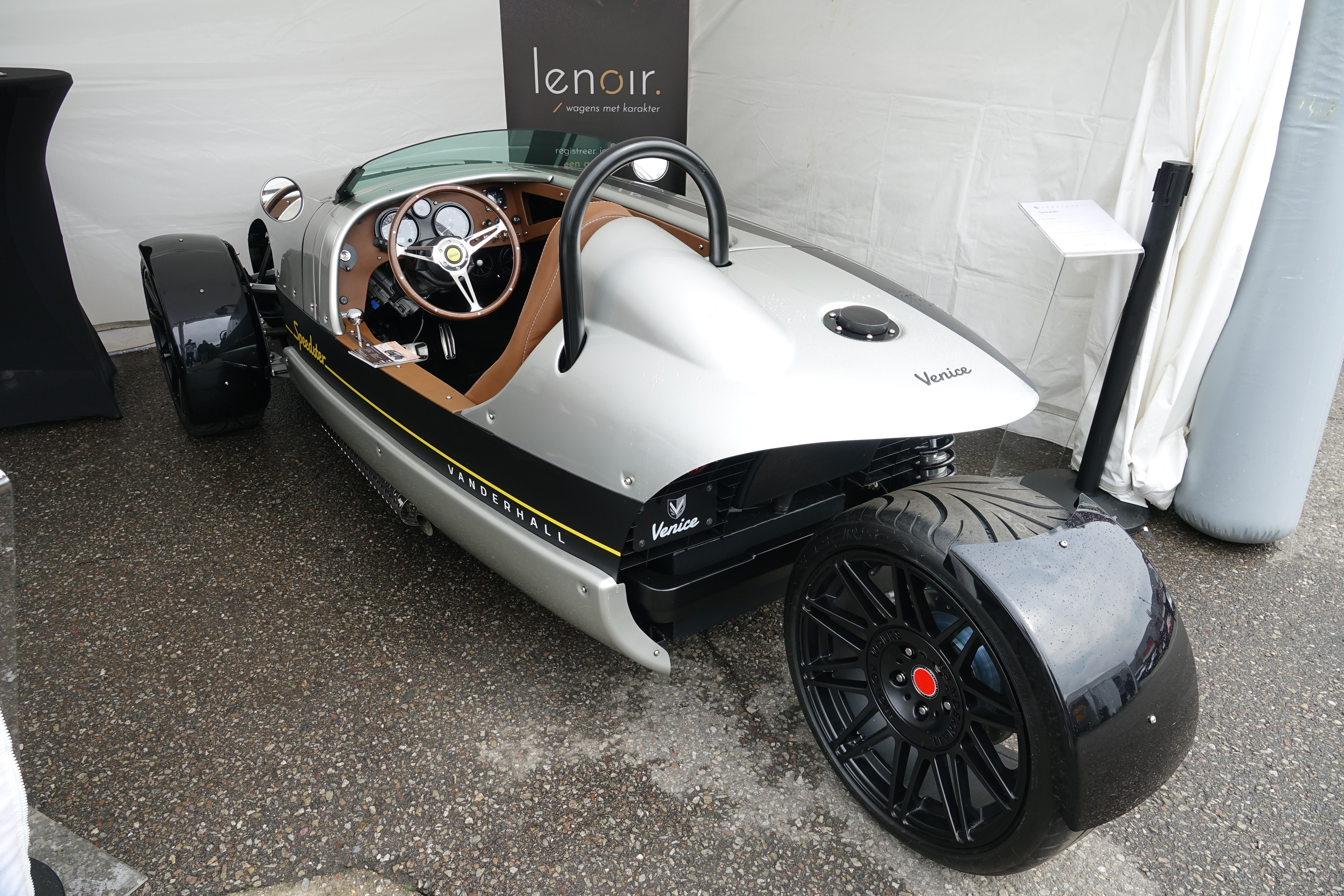
- Company type: Private
- Industry: Automotive
- Founded: 2010; 16 years ago
- Headquarters: Provo, Utah, United States
- Area served: United States of America
- Key people: Steve Hall, (CEO)
- Products: Autocycle
- Website: www.vanderhallusa.com

Vanderhall Motor Works is an American vehicle manufacturer based in Provo, Utah. It manufactures hand-made three-wheeled autocycles designed for sports driving, touring, commuting and city driving.

== History ==
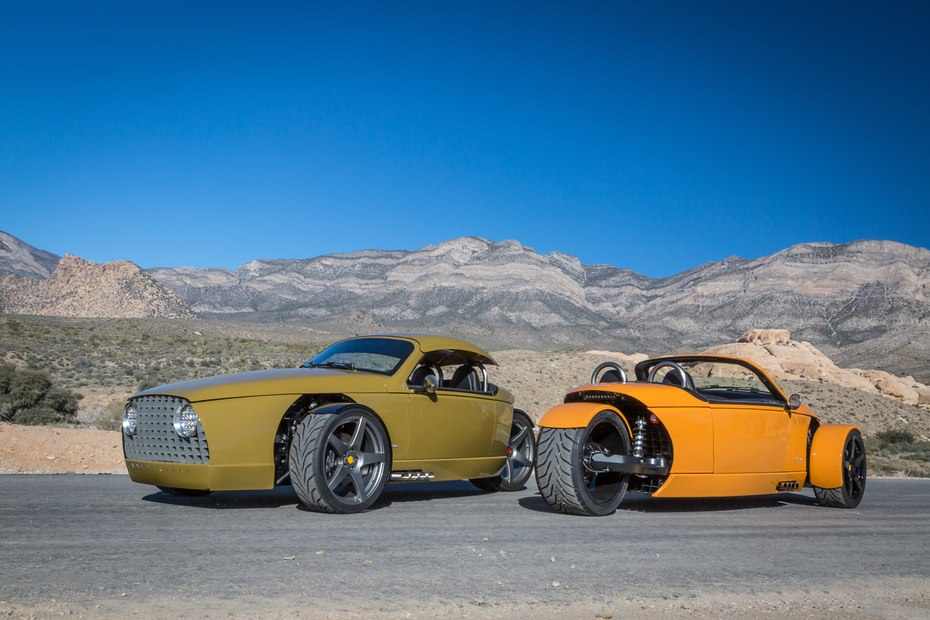
Vanderhall Laguna

Vanderhall Motor Works was founded in 2010 by Steve Hall. Hall, who had been a CAD designer at Novatek, spent five years prototyping before offering his designs to the public. His initial model was the Laguna: a three-wheel roadster that is federally classified as a motorcycle and passed final testing for NHTSA and EPA certification in 2016. In 2016, Vanderhall officially produced three autocycle models: Laguna, Laguna Sport Premium, and the Laguna Bespoke Motoring Experience. Each features a 1.4-liter, turbocharged GM Family 0 engine with a GM 6-speed automatic transmission.

On June 12 2023 Vanderhall Motor Works failed in an attempt to take the domain name vanderhall.com through the UDRP process. The respondent in this case registered the domain name in the year 2000 and the domain name matches the respondent's surname, 'van der Hall'.

== Models ==
=== Laguna ===
Vanderhall Motor Works announced in 2012 a two-seat vehicle, a kind of three-wheeled sports car that has been in production since 2016.

=== Venice ===
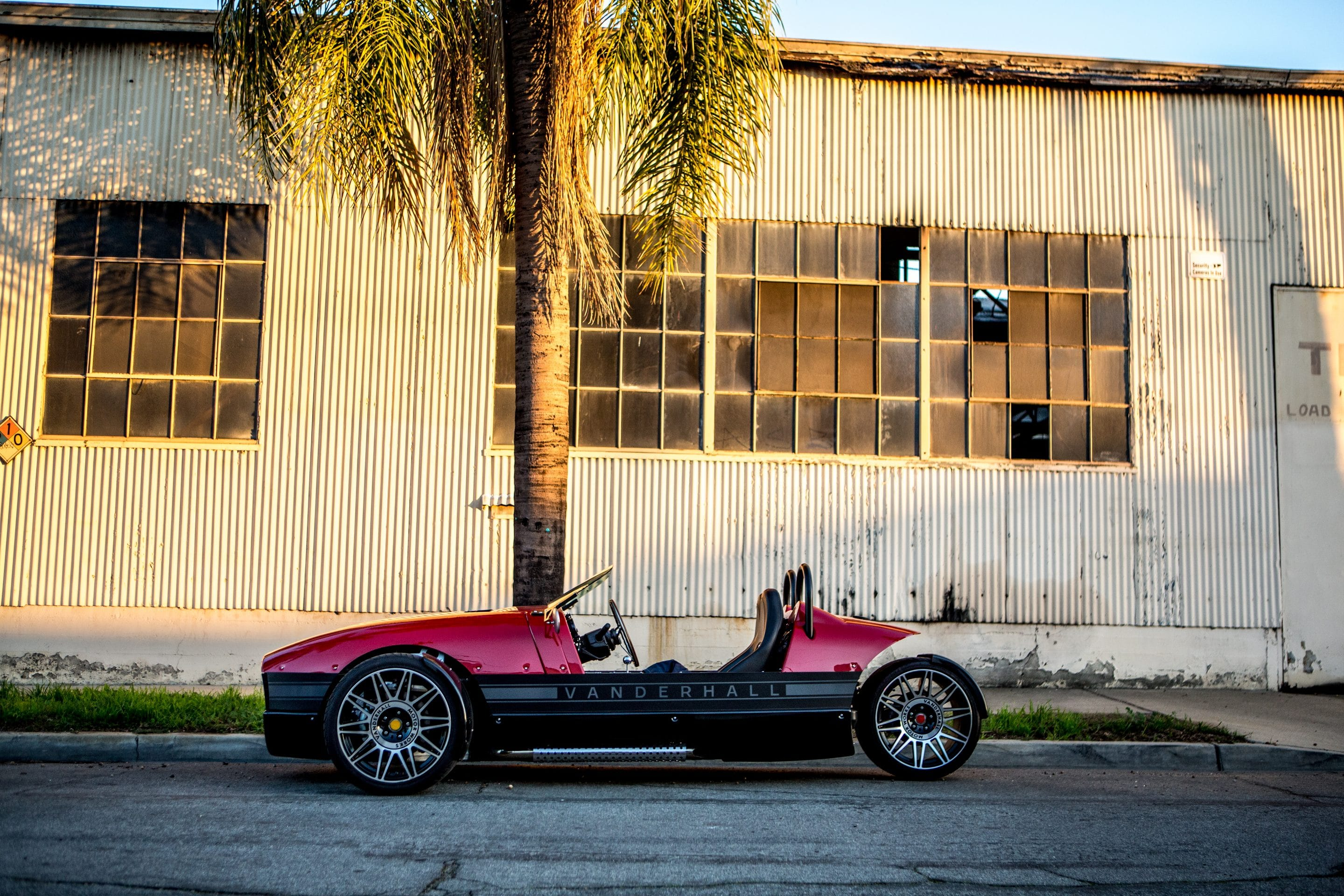
2017 Vanderhall Venice

The Venice was presented in 2017 with ABS bodywork.

=== Edison 2 ===
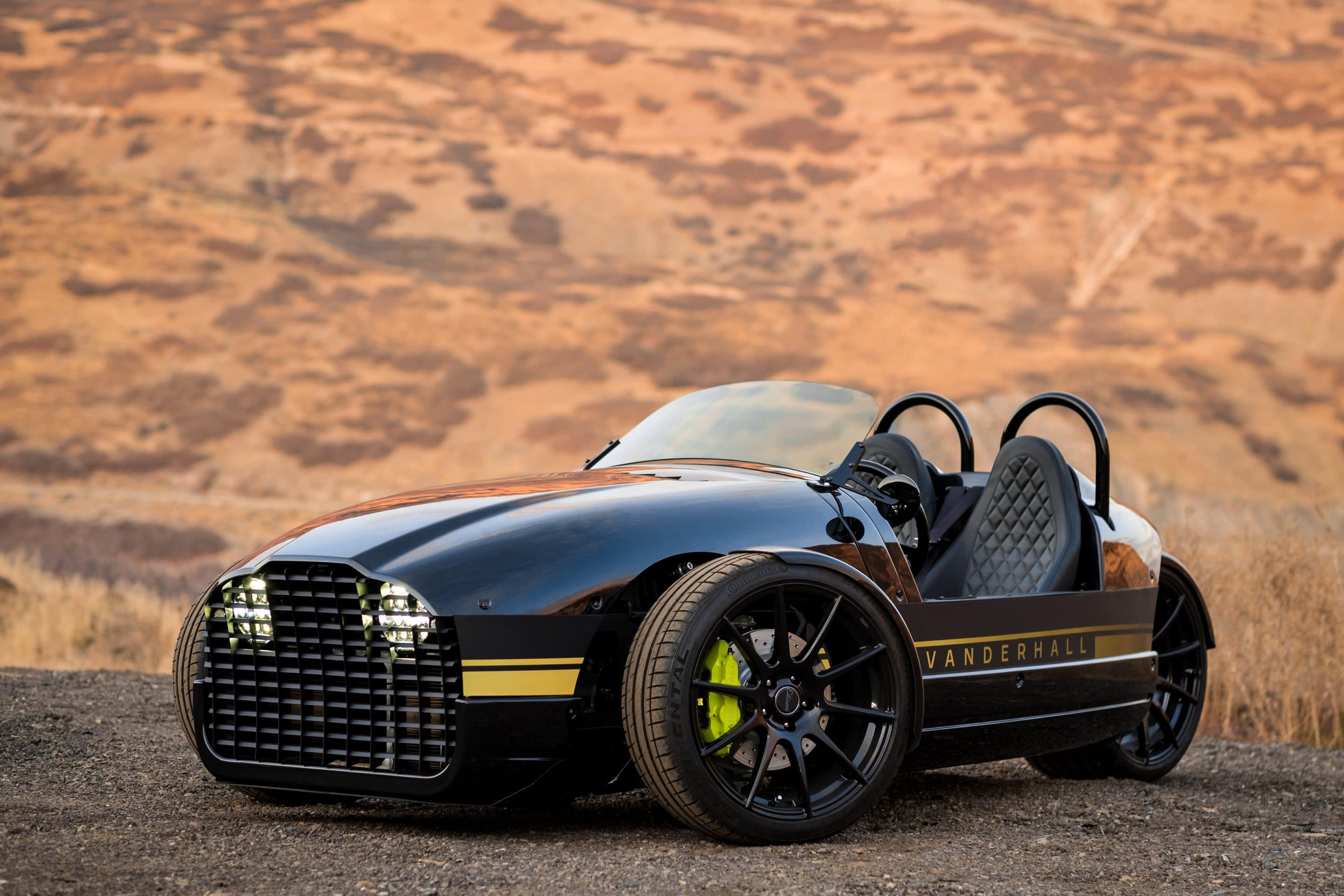
Vanderhall Edison2

Electric version of the model Venice.

=== Venice Speedster ===
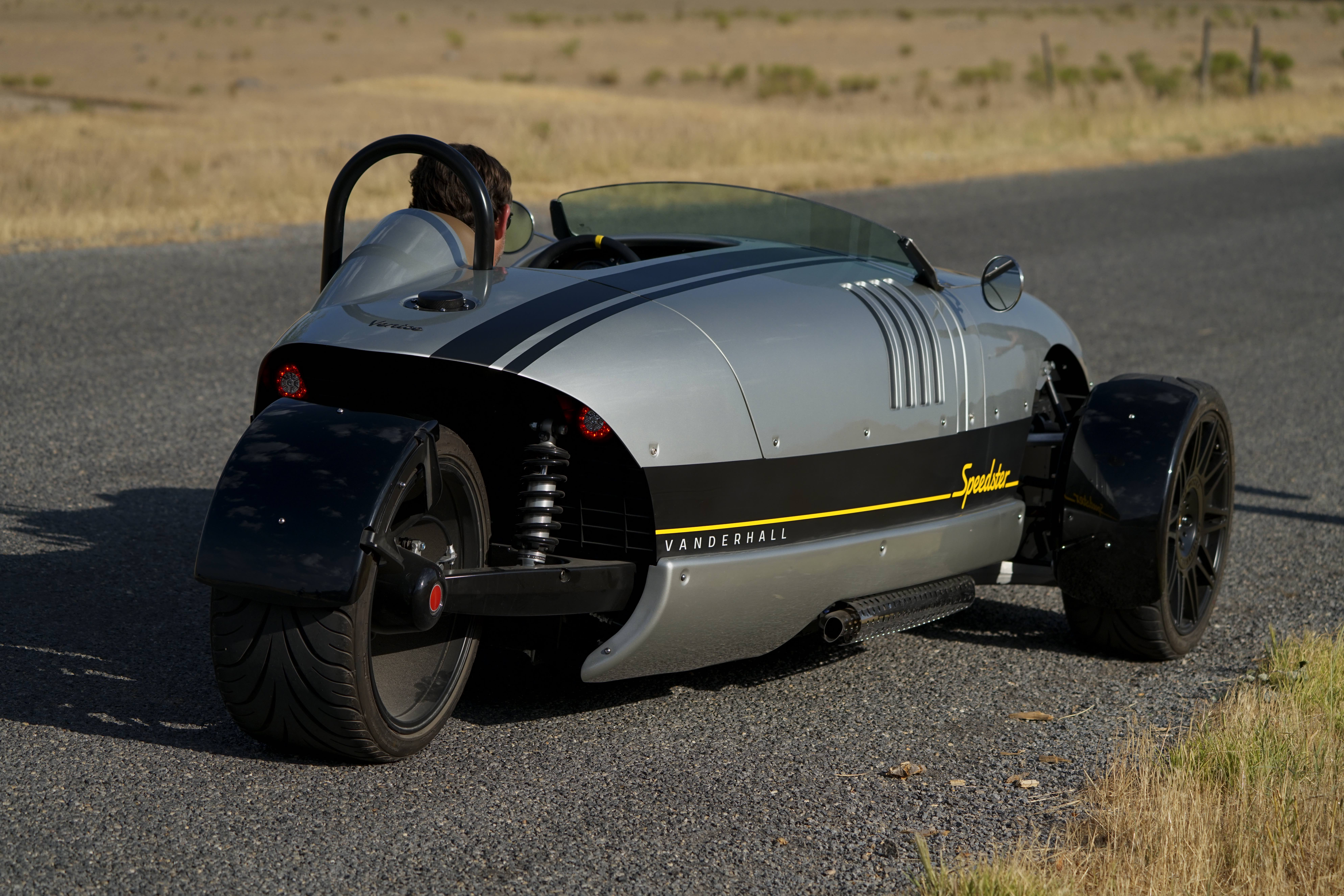
Vanderhall Venice Speedster

In 2018, Vanderhall announced a Speedster model at the annual Sturgis Rally.

=== Carmel ===
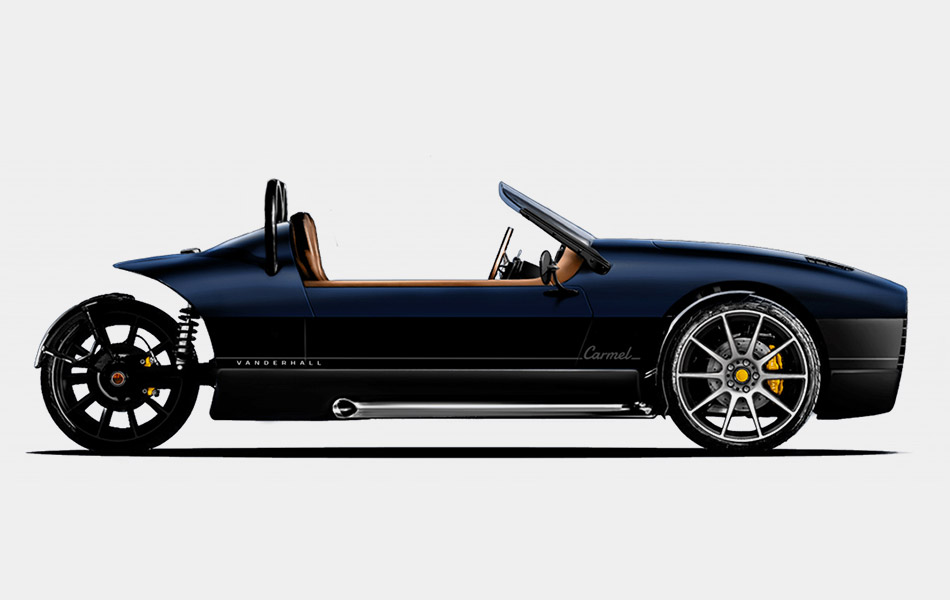
Vanderhall Carmel

The 2019 Carmel is Vanderhall's latest release.

=== Brawley ===
Quad motor electric off-roader.

== Concepts ==
- Yuma, extra cab pickup truck
- Speeder, retro, sports reverse trike
- Mammoth, EV snowcat
- Laduna, 2-seat dune buggy
- Catalina, retro, luxury speedboat
- Balboa, café racer motorcycle
- Indio, 3-wheel sports car
