= List of exclusively sports car manufacturers =

This is a list of specialist manufacturers or marques of modern and classic sports cars. It includes only companies that are devoted exclusively to producing sports cars.

A sports car is an automobile designed for performance driving; however the exact definition is subject to debate. Most automakers have produced, or are currently marketing, some type of sports vehicles. This list is not meant to enumerate every manufacturer that also makes other types of vehicles or has other business units.

== Europe ==
- Adam Brothers (UK; defunct)
- Adrenaline Motorsport (UK)
- Alpine (France)
- Apollo Automobil (Germany)
- Ariel Motor Company (UK)

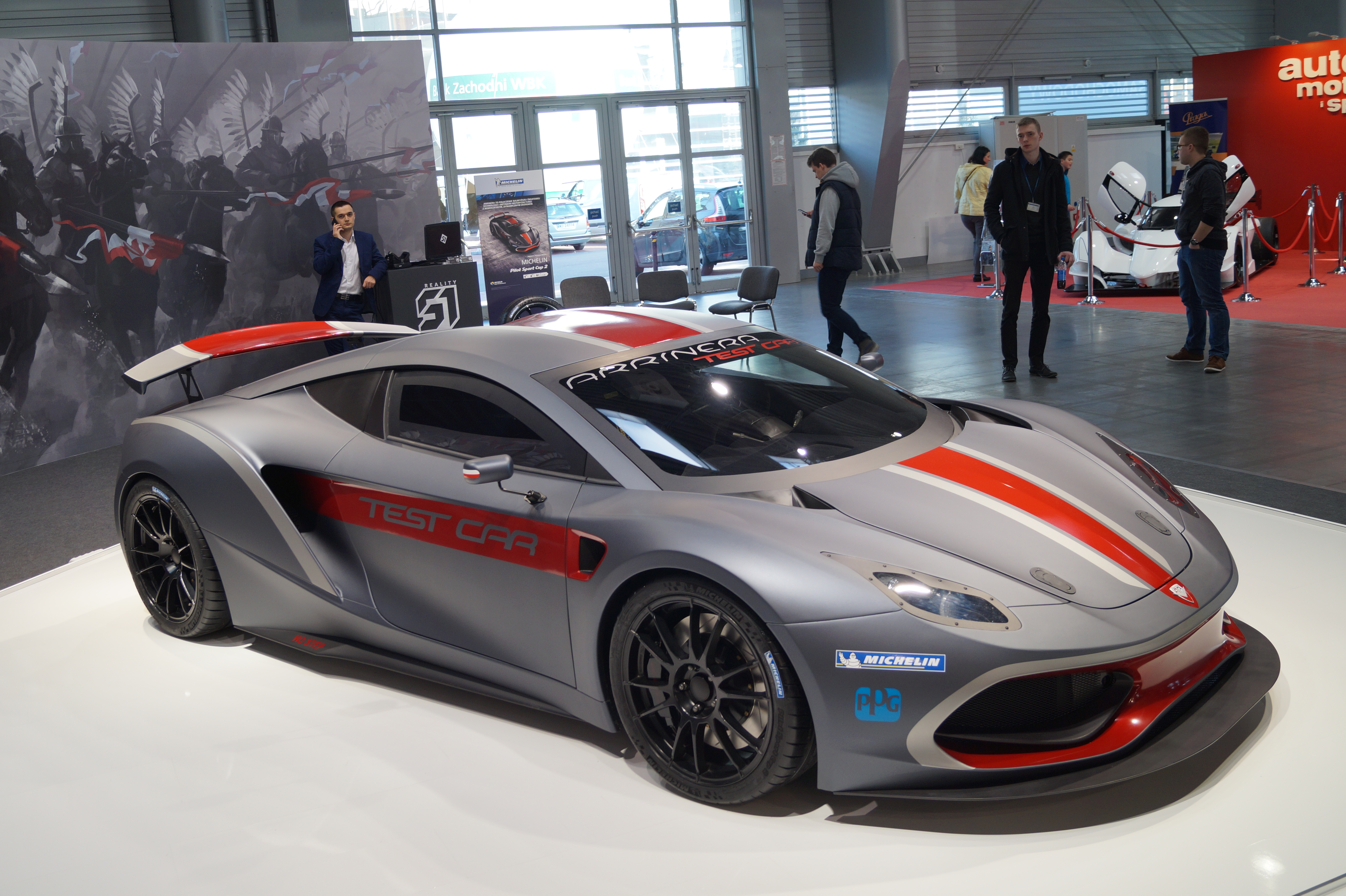
Arrinera Hussarya

- Arash Motor Company (UK)
- Arrinera (Poland)
- Artega (Germany)
- Ascari (UK; defunct)
- Aspid (Spain)
- Automobili Turismo e Sport (Italy)
- Bizzarrini (Italy; defunct)
- Boreas (Spain)
- Brabham (UK)
- B Racing (Czech Republic)
- Briggs Automotive Company (UK)
- Brooke (UK)
- Bugatti Automobiles (France)
- Burton (Netherlands)
- Caparo (UK; defunct)
- Caterham (UK)
- Charge Automotive (UK)
- Cizeta (Italy; defunct)
- Covini Engineering (Italy)
- Clan (UK; defunct)
- Dallara (Italy)
- Danvignes (France; defunct)
- Darrian/Davrian Cars (UK)
- Dauer Sportwagen (Germany, defunct)
- Dax (UK)
- Delage (France)
- De Tomaso (Italy)
- Donkervoort (Netherlands)
- Edran (Belgium)
- Elemental Motor Company (UK)

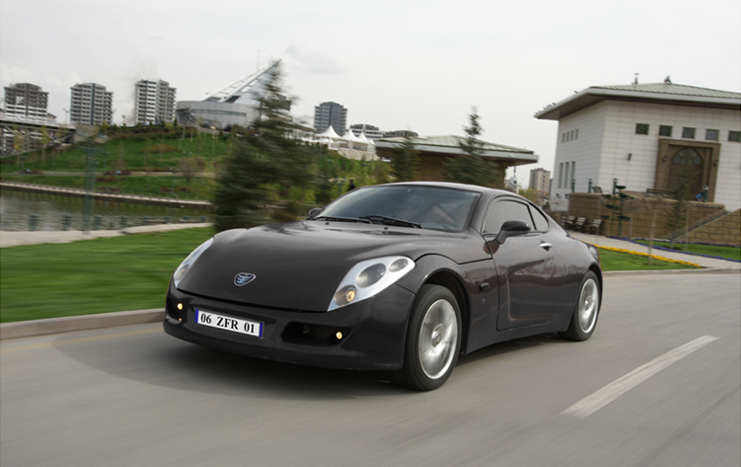
Etox Zafer Coupé

- Etox (Turkey)
- Ferrari (Italy)
- Fittipaldi Motors LLC (Italy)
- Foreman (UK)
- FYK (Norway)
- Gardner Douglas (UK)
- Gemballa (Germany)
- Gillet (Belgium)
- Ginetta (UK)
- GKD Sports Cars (UK)
- Gordon Murray Automotive (UK)
- Grinnall Specialist Cars (UK)
- GTA Spano (Spain)
- Hommell (France)
- Hurtan (Spain)
- Icona (Italy)
- Isdera (Germany)
- Jensen Motors (UK; defunct)
- Jösse Car (Sweden; defunct)

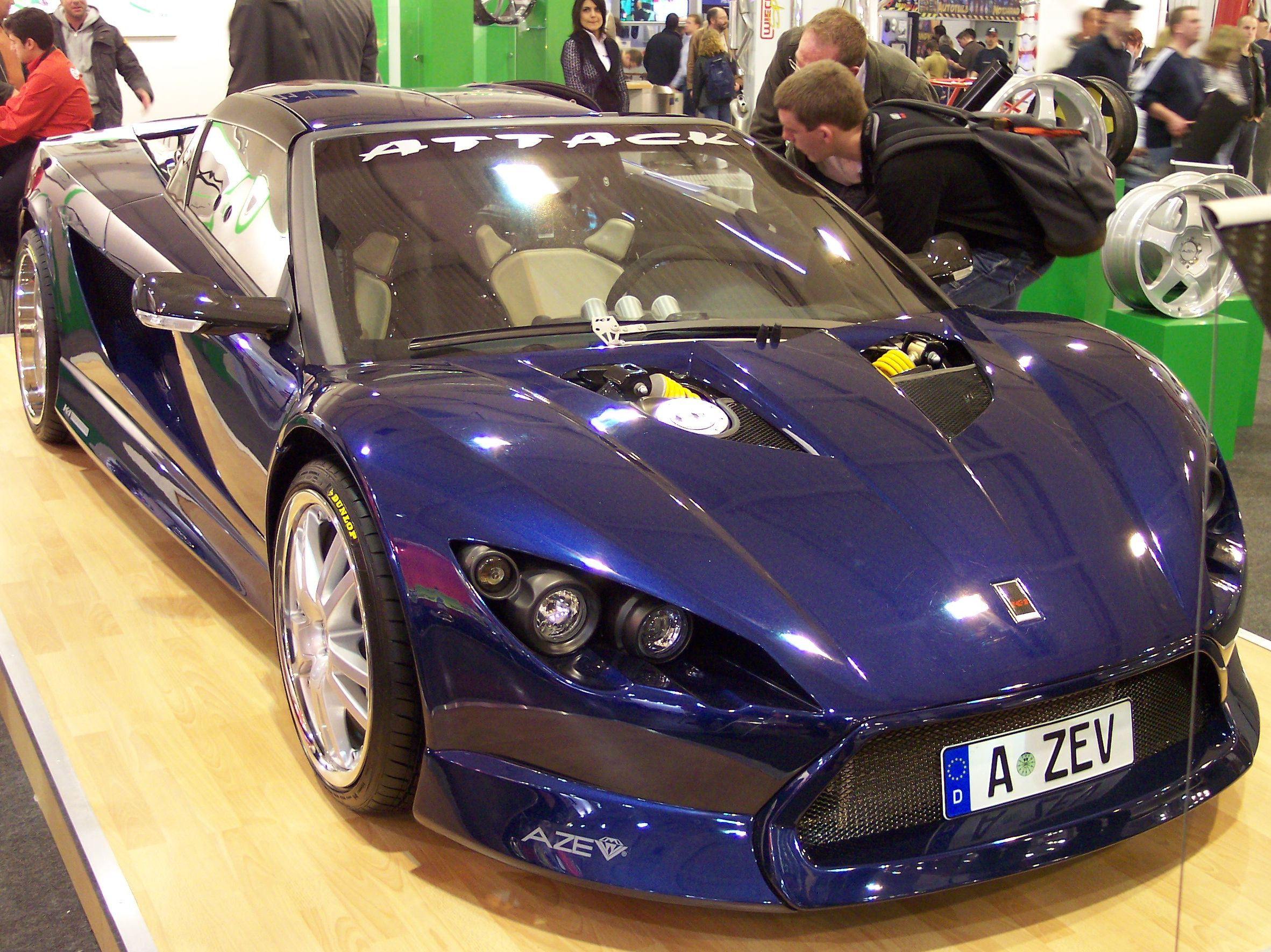
K-1 Attack Roadster

- K-1 Engineering (Slovakia; defunct)
- Kaipan (Czech Republic)
- Leading Edge (UK; defunct)
- Leblanc (Switzerland)

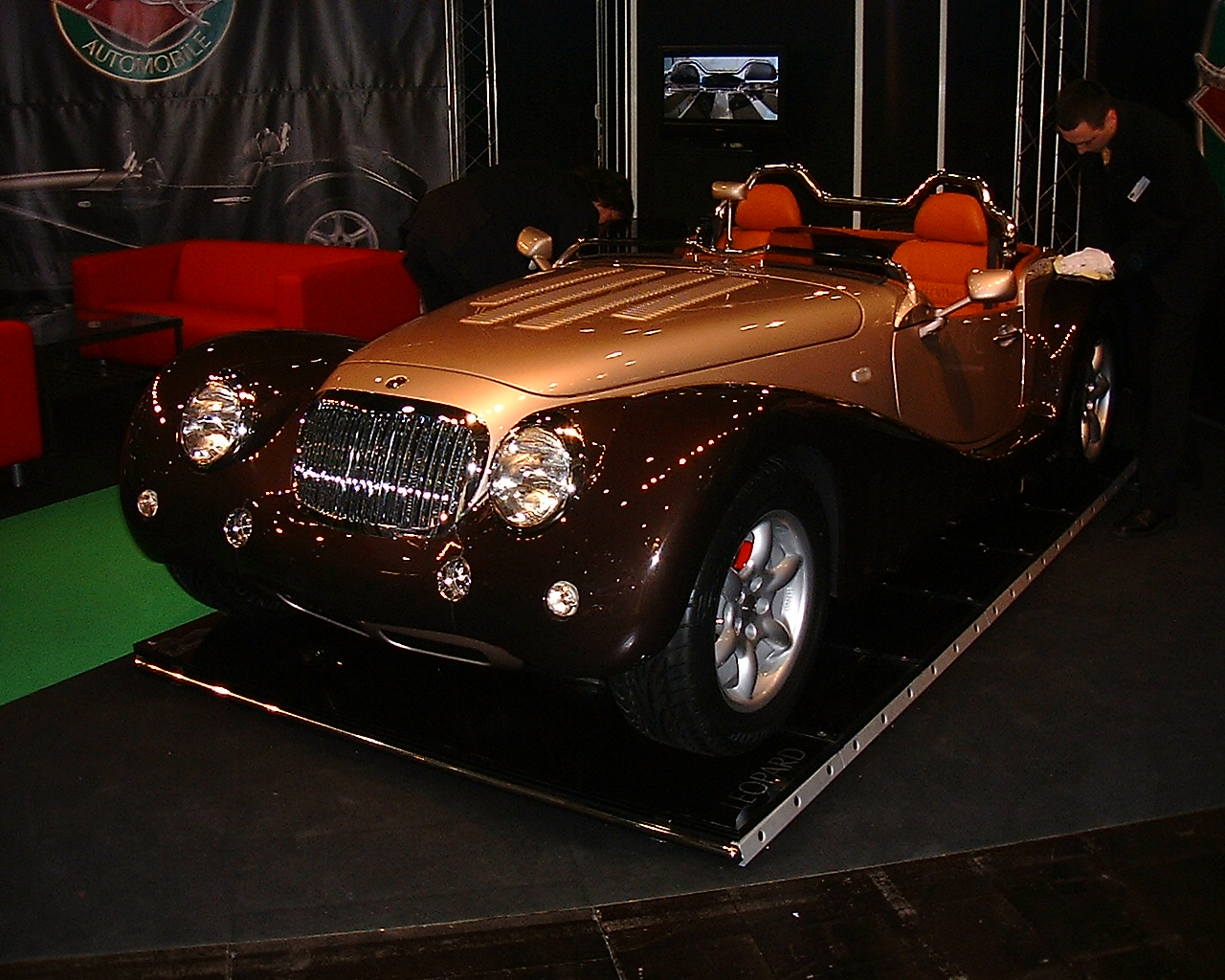
Leopard 6 Litre Roadster

- Leopard (Poland)
- Light Car Company (UK; defunct)
- Lightning Car Company (UK)
- Lister Cars (UK)
- Lola Cars (UK; defunct)
- Lotec (Germany)
- Marcadier (France; defunct)
- Marcos (UK; defunct)
- Marussia Motors (Russia; defunct)
- MAT (Italy)
- Maserati (Italy)
- Mazzanti Automobili (Italy)
- McLaren Automotive (UK)
- Melling Wildcat (UK)
- Monteverdi (automobile) (Switzerland; defunct)
- Morgan (UK)
- MTX (Czech Republic; defunct)
- Noble (UK)
- Orca Engineering (Liechtenstein)
- Pagani (Italy)
- PGO (France)
- Prato (France)
- Quantum Sports Cars (UK)
- Qvale (Italy)
- Radical Sportscars (UK)
- Rimac Automobili (Croatia)
- Rochdale (UK; defunct)
- RUF (Germany)
- Sebring (UK)
- Sbarro (automobile) (Switzerland)
- SIN Cars (Bulgaria)
- Spectre (UK; defunct)
- Spyker Cars (Netherlands)
- Stealth (UK; defunct)
- Strathcarron (UK; defunct)
- Tauro Sport Auto (Spain)
- Tiger (UK)
- TMC (Ireland)
- Tramontana (Spain)
- Tushek&Spigel Supercars (Austria)
- TVR (UK)
- Ultima Sports (UK)
- UVA (UK; defunct)
- Vencer (Netherlands)
- Veritas (Germany)
- Westfield Sportscars (UK)
- Wiesmann (Germany)
- Yes! (Germany)
- Zenos Cars (UK)
- Zenvo (Denmark)

== Americas ==
- Anteros Coachworks (USA)
- Bocar (USA; defunct)

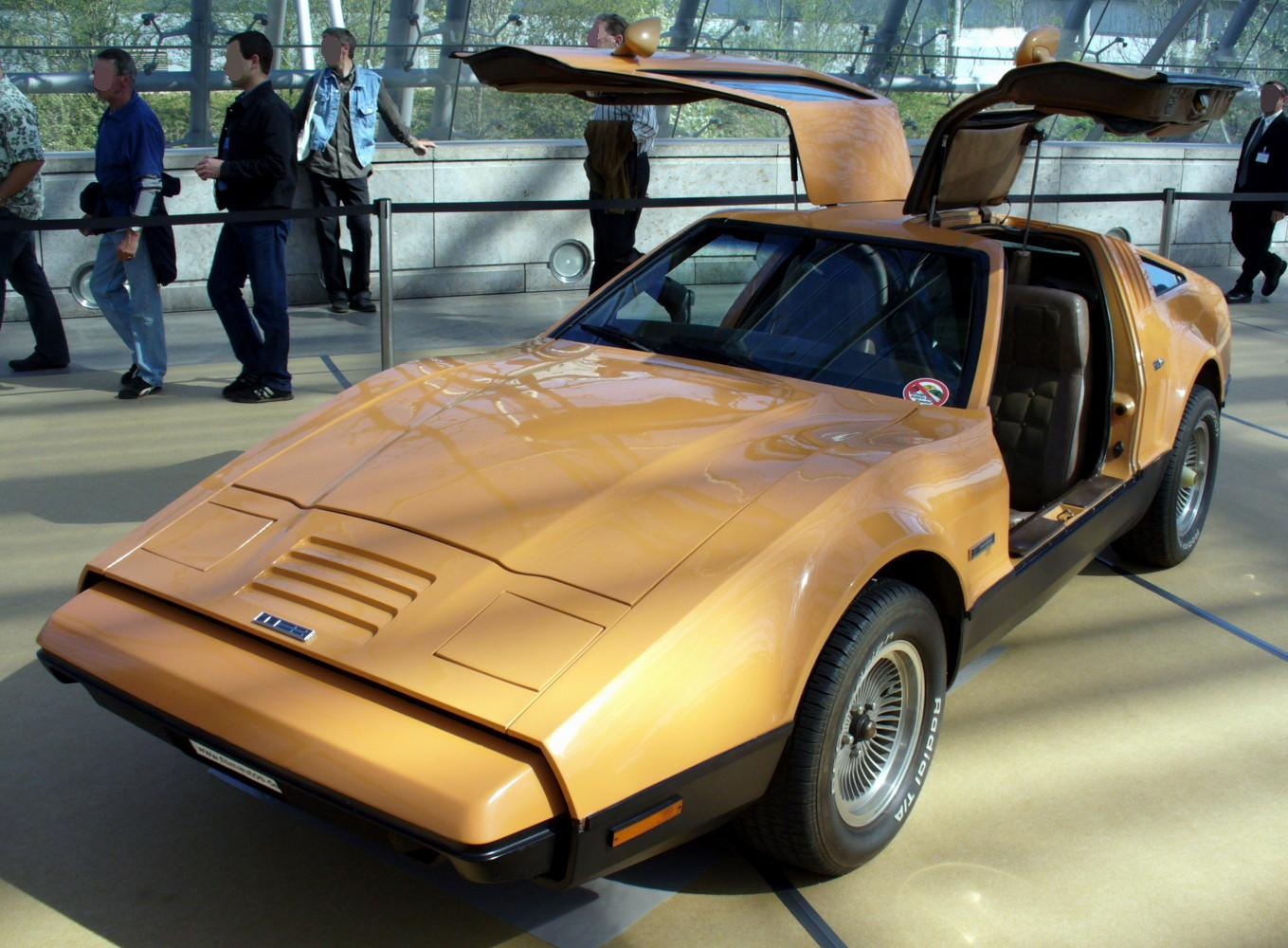
Bricklin SV-1

- Bricklin (Canada; defunct)
- Cunningham (USA; defunct)
- Chamonix (Brazil)
- Chaparral Cars (USA; defunct)
- Czinger (USA)

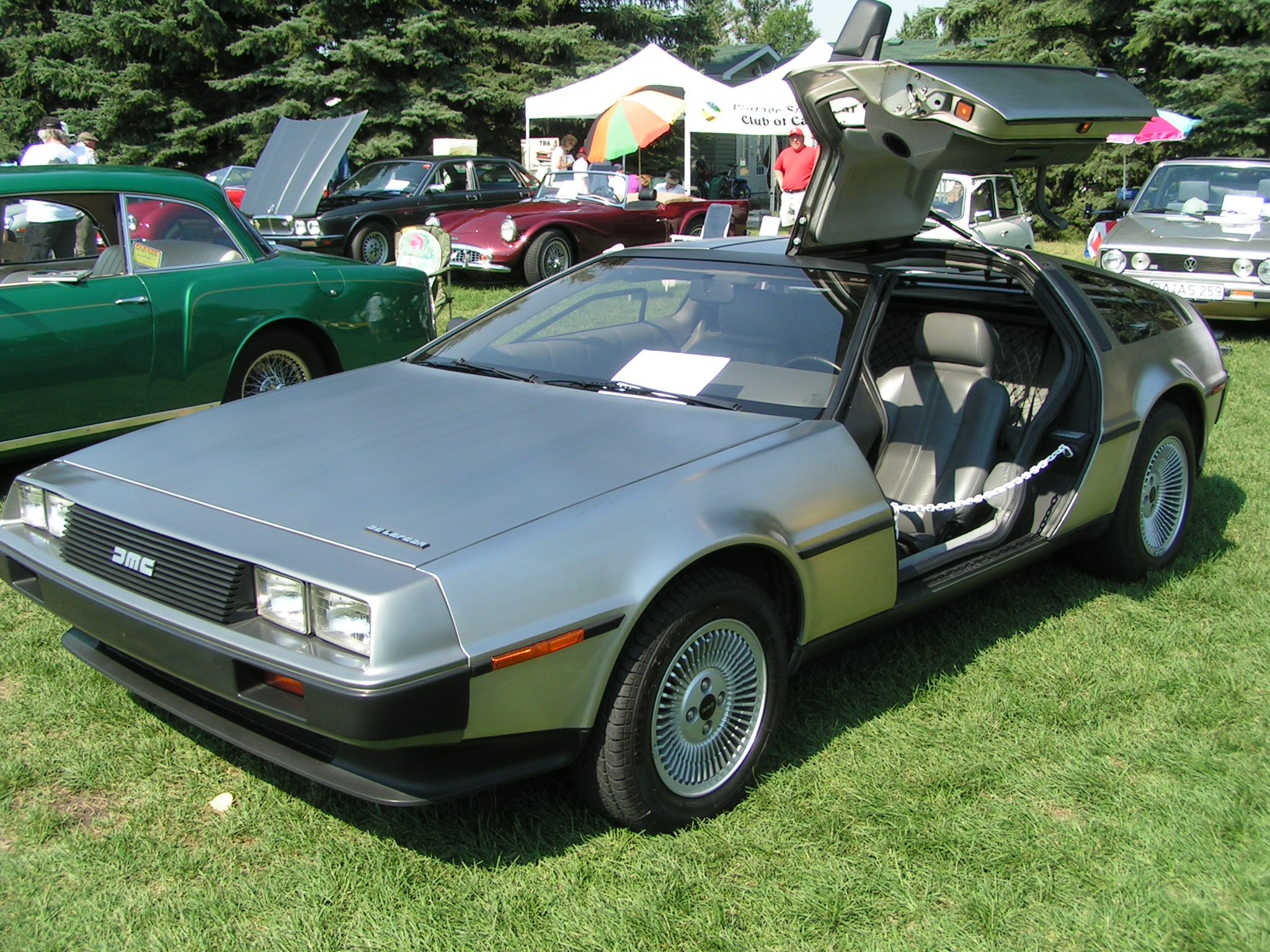
DeLorean DMC-12

- Fields Auto Works (USA)
- DeLorean Motor Company (USA; defunct)
- DeLorean Motor Company (Texas) (USA)
- Devon Motorworks (USA; defunct)
- Factory Five Racing (USA)
- Falcon Motorsports (USA)
- Hennessey Performance Engineering (USA)
- HTT (Canada)
- Lobini (Brazil, defunct)
- Mastretta (Mexico)
- Mosler Automotive (USA; defunct)
- Palatov Motorsports (US)
- Panoz (USA)
- Rossion (USA)
- Saleen (USA)
- Shelby American (USA)
- Singer (USA)
- SSC North America (USA)
- Superlite Cars (USA)
- Scuderia Cameron Glickenhaus (USA)
- SSZ Motorcars (USA; defunct)
- TASCO - The American Sports Car Company. Built a prototype in 1948 with "T-top" roof. (USA; defunct)
- Vector Motors (USA)
- VUHL (Mexico)

== Africa ==
- Birkin Cars (South Africa)
- Glass Sport Motors (South Africa; defunct)
- G.R.P. Engineering (South Africa; defunct)
- Laraki (Morocco)

== Oceania ==
- Alpha Sports (Australia)
- Bolwell (Australia)
- Elfin (Australia)
- Hyper Racer X1 (Australia)
- Joss (Australia)
- Minetti Sports Cars (Australia)

== Asia ==
- Arcfox (China)
- Aspark (Japan)
- Dome (Japan)
- Frem (Lebanon)
- Chinkara Motors (India)
- Ken Okuyama Design (Japan)
- Oullim Spirra (Korea; Defunct)
- Qiantu (China)
- Techrules (China)
- Vemac (Japan)
- W Motors (UAE)
