= Poznań Motor Show =

The Poznań Motor Show is the largest motor show in Poland. It is organized every year by the Poznań International Fair.

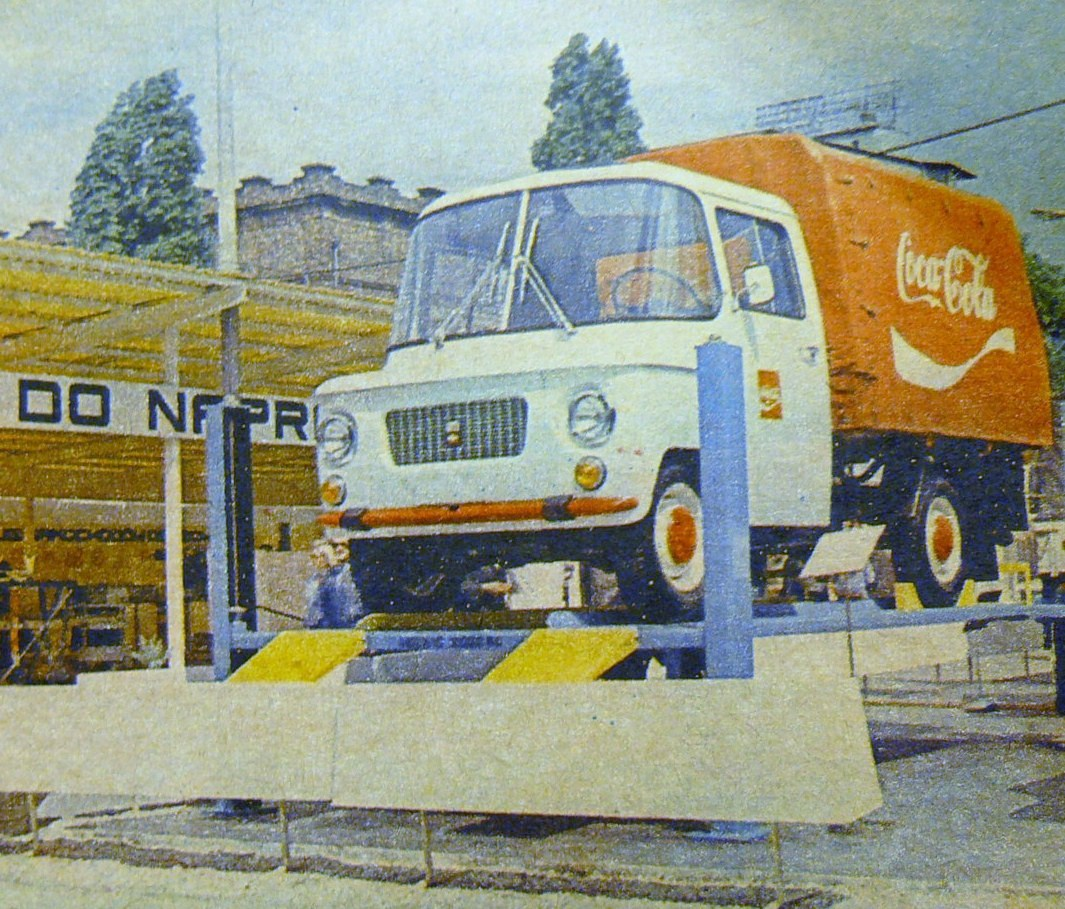
ZSD Nysa Coca-Cola truck, June 1973

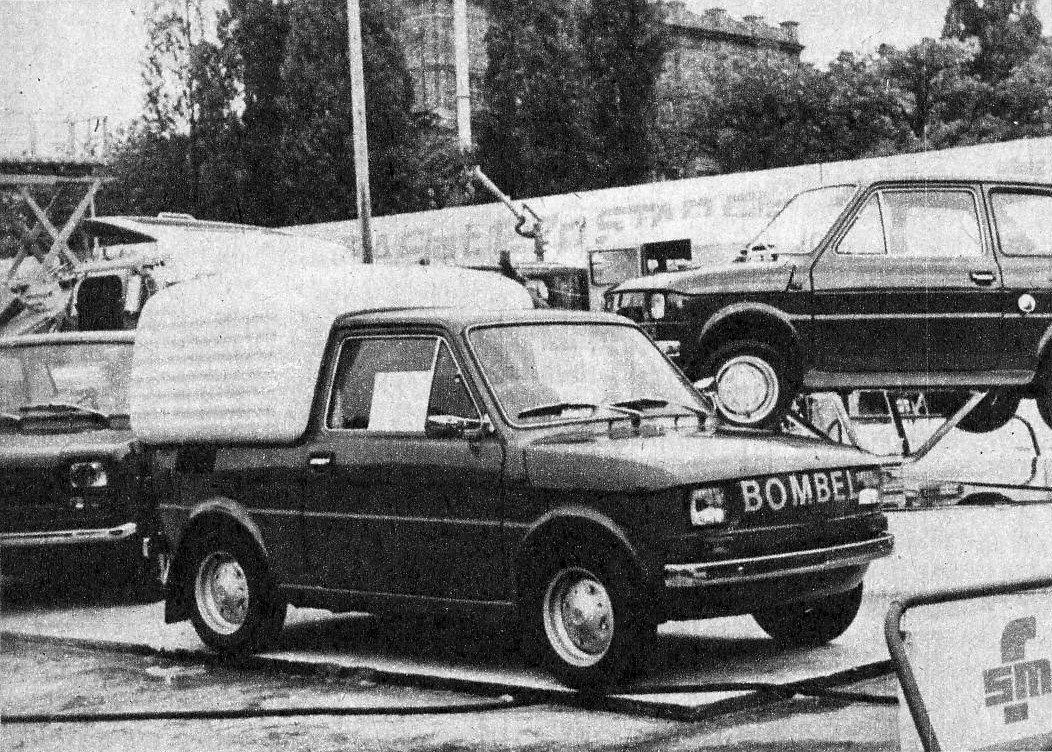
Fiat 126p Bombel, 1983

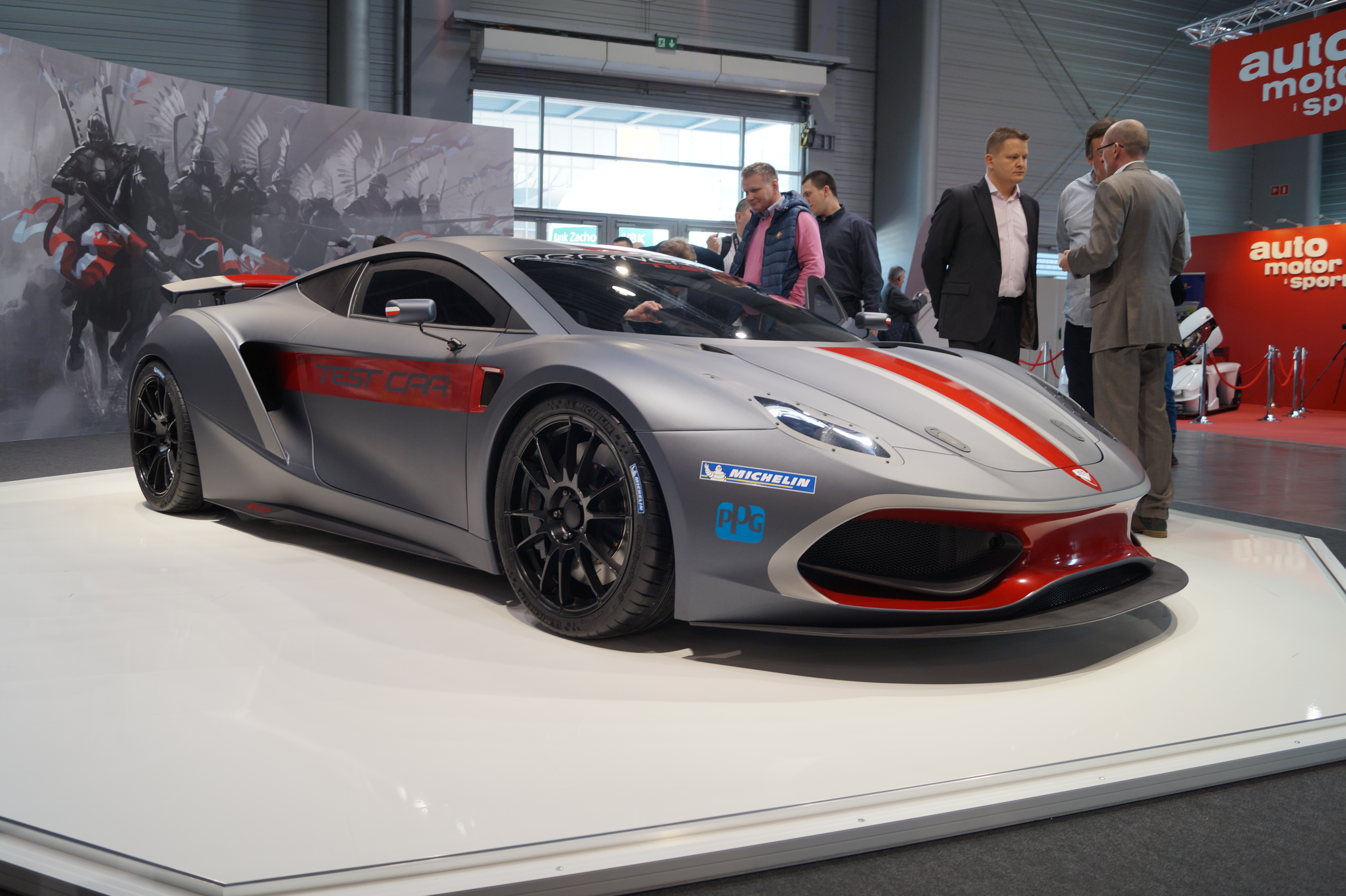
Arrinera Hussarya, April 2015

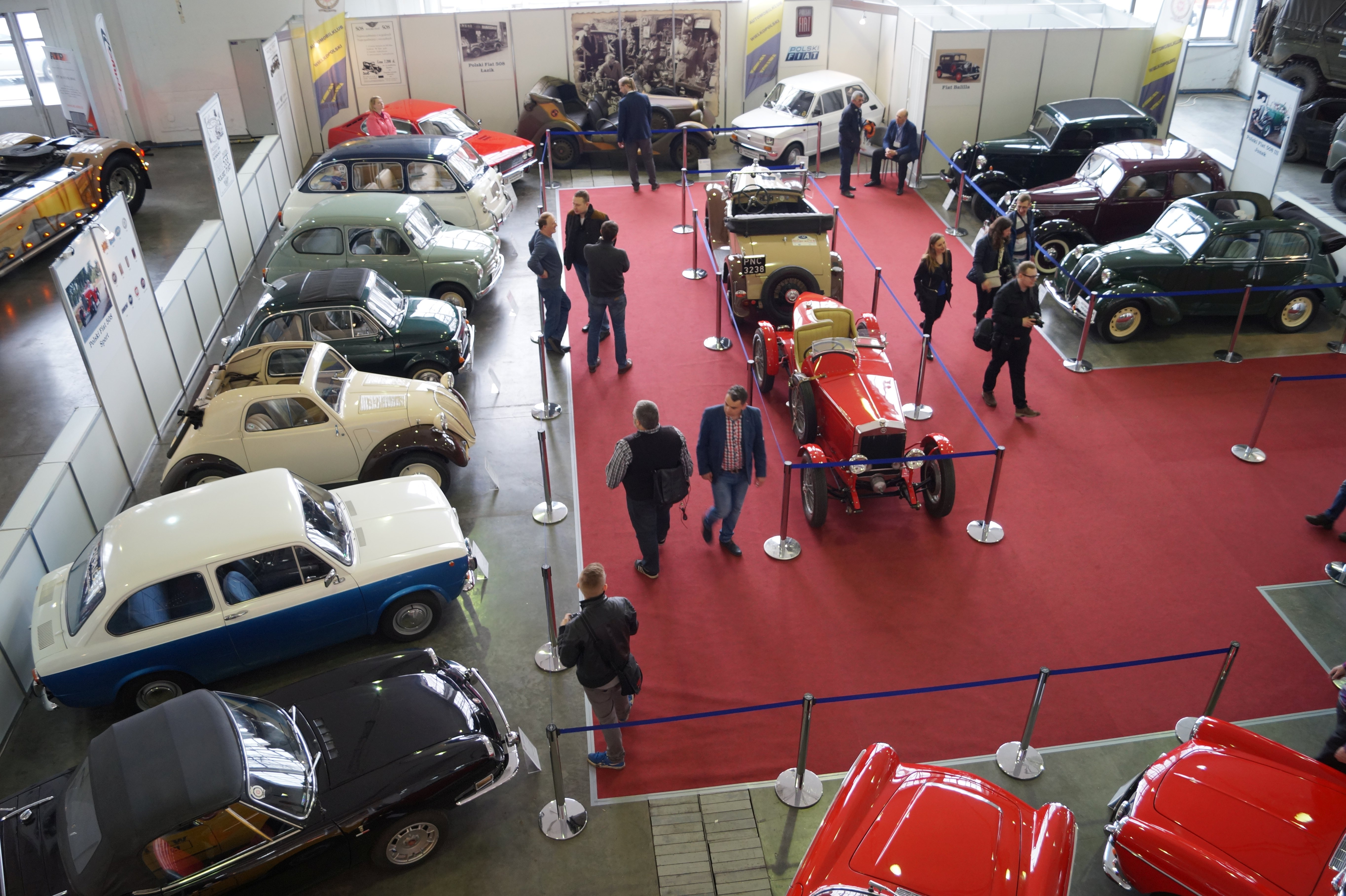
Stand celebrating 85 years of Fiat's licence in Poland, March 2016

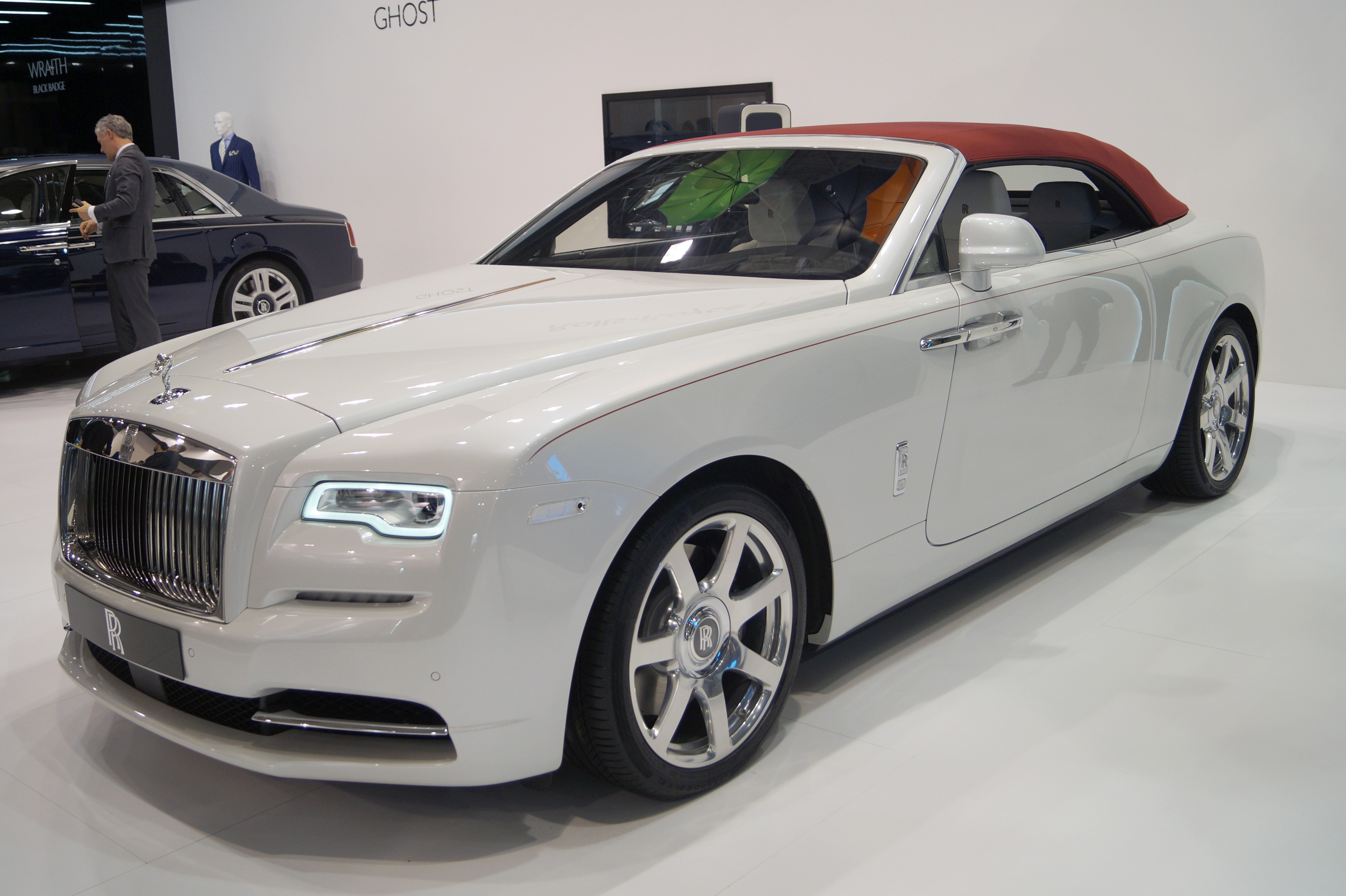
Rolls-Royce Dawn, March 2017

Depending on the year, the show is often accompanied by various additional exhibitions, such as a motorcycle showroom, caravanning show, or aviation showroom, as well as additional attractions such as motorcycle shows, vintage car shows, obstacle courses or custom vehicle exhibitions.

== History ==
=== 20th century ===
Before 1992, the motor show was part of the Poznań International Fair. In 1992, the first independent International Automotive Fair was organized, during which the BMW E36, Mazda 626 and Nissan Maxima were presented, among others. A year later, during the fair, the results of the Auto'93 competition organized by the national automotive weekly Motor together with the Polish Automotive Agency and Auto Głos were announced . In 1994, a press day was organized for the first time, closed to the public and intended for automotive journalists and invited industry representatives.

=== New name ===
At the 1999 show, the results of a competition for the new name of the motor show were announced, the winning submission being Poznań Motor Show. During the same show, the first Solaris bus was revealed. The name Poznań Motor Show was first used at the 2000 show. Several records were set at this event: over 300 car models were presented, the exhibition size amounted to 59,000 square meters, and the number of visitors exceeded 117,000. In 2001, the fair was visited by approximately 100,000 people. In 2003, the last edition of the Motor Show took place before a several year hiatus. From 2006 to 2009, the Poznań Automotive Meetings were organized every May for industry representatives and visitors.

=== Resumption ===
The motor show returned to the trade fair calendar in 2010. During return of the fair, a competition was organised in which participants could win a car. In 2016, the European premiere of the current generation of the Hyundai Elantra model took place. Two years later, in 2018, the European premiere of another new car took place in Poznań, the Volkswagen Touareg.

=== Two year break ===
On March 3, 2020, the management board of Grupa MTP announced that the next edition of the Poznań Motor Show, originally scheduled for March 26–29, had been postponed to the later dates of June 18–21, due to the deteriorating situation in connection with the outbreak of the COVID-19 pandemic. The further spread of the pandemic later prompted the organizers to completely cancel the show for that year.

The further spread of the pandemic in Poland during the spring of 2021 made it impossible to organize the next edition of the Poznań Motor Show, and in April it was announced that the motor show, originally schedule to take place between June 18–20, 2021, had been cancelled. The MTP Group later successfully reorganised the Poznań Motor Show in April 2022 after a 2-year break.

== Shows ==
After resumption in 2010

Motor Show	Date	Number of Visitors
Poznań Motor Show 2011	March 18–20, 2011	46,500
Poznań Motor Show 2012	April 13–15, 2012	60,000
Poznań Motor Show 2013	April 4–7, 2013	86,000
Poznań Motor Show 2014	March 27–30, 2014	96,013
Poznań Motor Show 2015	April 9–12, 2015	113,000
Poznań Motor Show 2016	March 31-April 3, 2016	133,108
Poznań Motor Show 2017	April 6–9, 2017	135,023
Poznań Motor Show 2018	April 5–8, 2018	151,437
Poznań Motor Show 2019	March 28–31, 2019	146,718
Poznań Motor Show 2020	March 26–29, 2020 June 18–21, 2020	Cancelled Cancelled
Poznań Motor Show 2021	June 18–20, 2021	Cancelled
Poznań Motor Show 2022	April 7–10, 2022	57,000
Poznań Motor Show 2023	March 30-April 2, 2023	96,103
Poznań Motor Show 2024	4-7 April 2024	94 089
Poznań Motor Show 2025	24-27 April 2025	91 000
Poznań Motor Show 2026	23-26 April 2026	planned event
