= Quantum Sports Cars =

UK kit car manufacturer

- Type: Private
- Industry: Automobile manufacturing
- Founded: 1987; 39 years ago
- Founder: Mark Wooldridge; Harvey Wooldridge
- Headquarters: South Brent, United Kingdom

Quantum Sports Cars is a British kit car manufacturer founded by brothers Mark and Harvey Wooldridge in 1987 originally based in Stourbridge. Under current ownership Quantum Sports Cars are based in South Brent.

== Early models ==
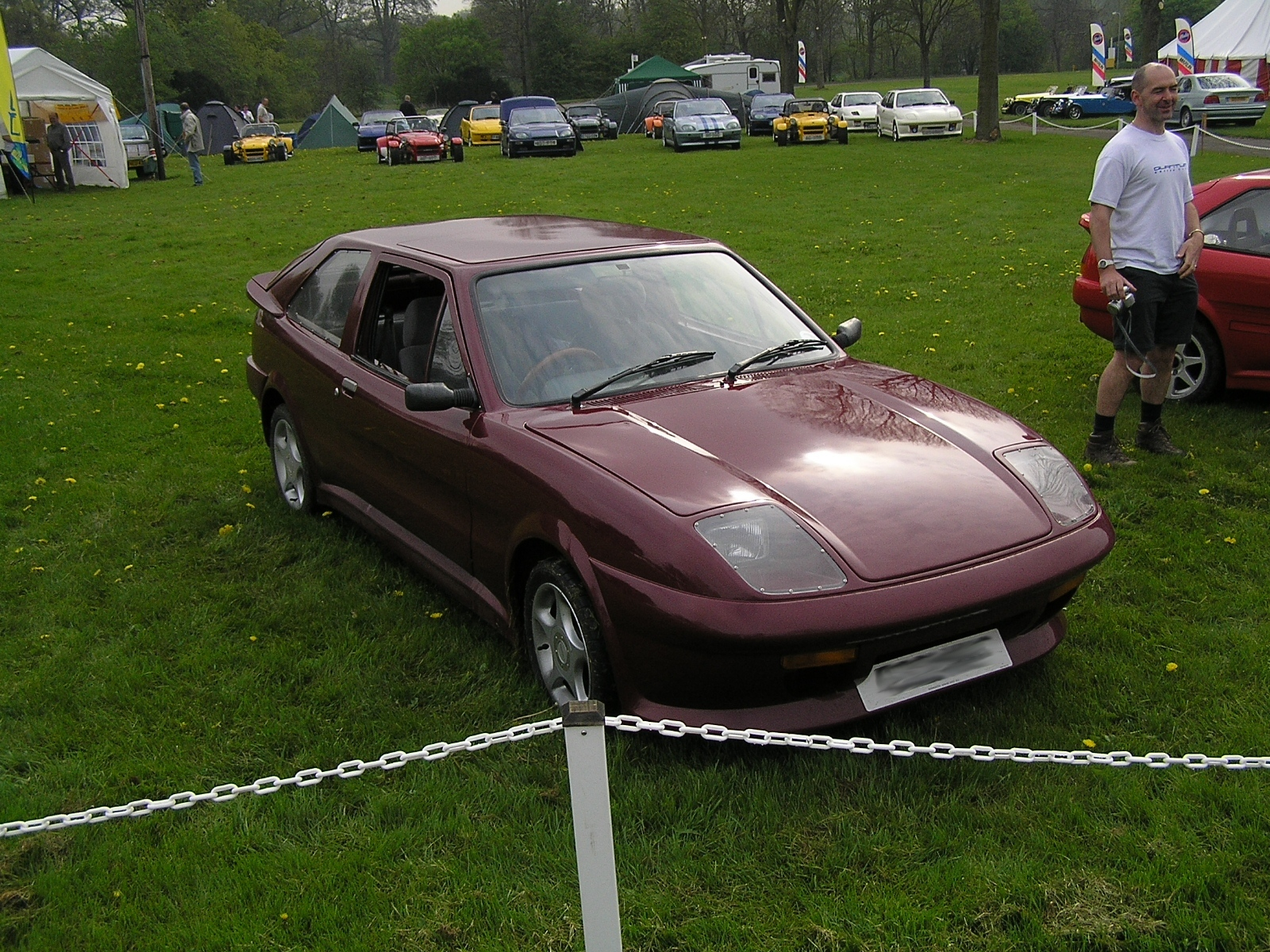
Quantum Hatchback

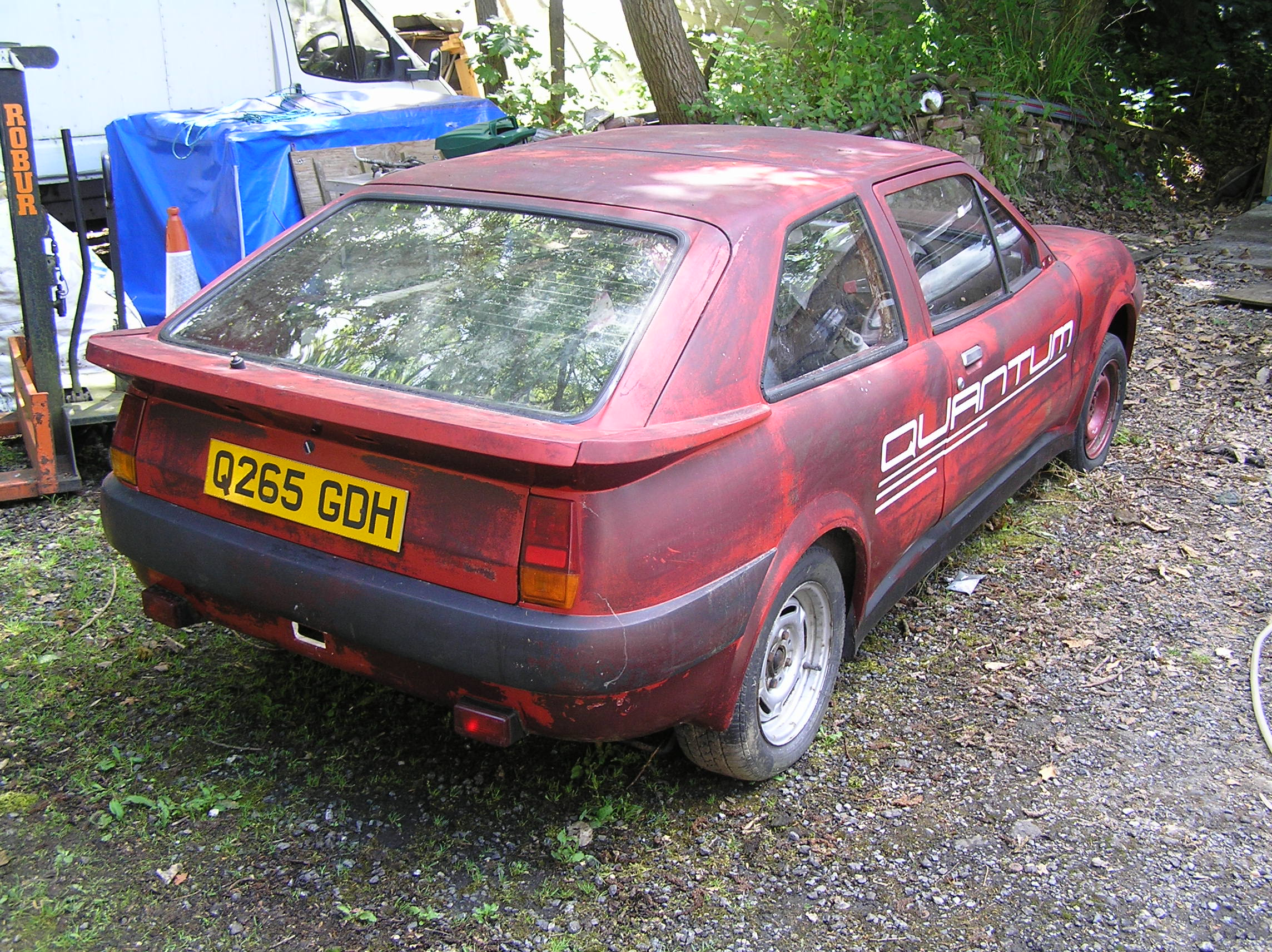
Quantum Mark 1 Hatchback Chassis Q003 as of June 2009. Car requiring extensive restoration and major repair work to the front of the car.

Quantum's first car was the Mark 1 hatchback (also known as the Mk 1 Coupé) which was based on the Ford Fiesta Mark 1. It reused all of the donor's mechanical and trim components in an elongated, more rounded shape. Due to its reduced weight over the donor vehicle, performance was significantly improved. The Coupé is unusual for low-volume car manufacturer in that it has a glass-reinforced plastic (grp) monocoque rather than a separate metal chassis. This approach relied upon the use of computer analysis to ensure that structural rigidity would not be compromised, offering the strength of a steel chassis but without the weight penalty.

The first Mark 1 Quantum, bearing chassis number 001, was a development mule and was subject to so much adjustment that the Wooldridge brothers eventually decided the car would be too dangerous to keep on the road. This car was therefore disposed of in landfill. Chassis 002 was later believed to have been damaged beyond repair in a head-on collision, so chassis 003 is now the oldest surviving example of a Quantum model and the first to be sold, after a short period being used for magazine tests and promotional materials. To ensure this historic car survives, the Quantum Owners Club has acquired this car and are in the process of restoring it.

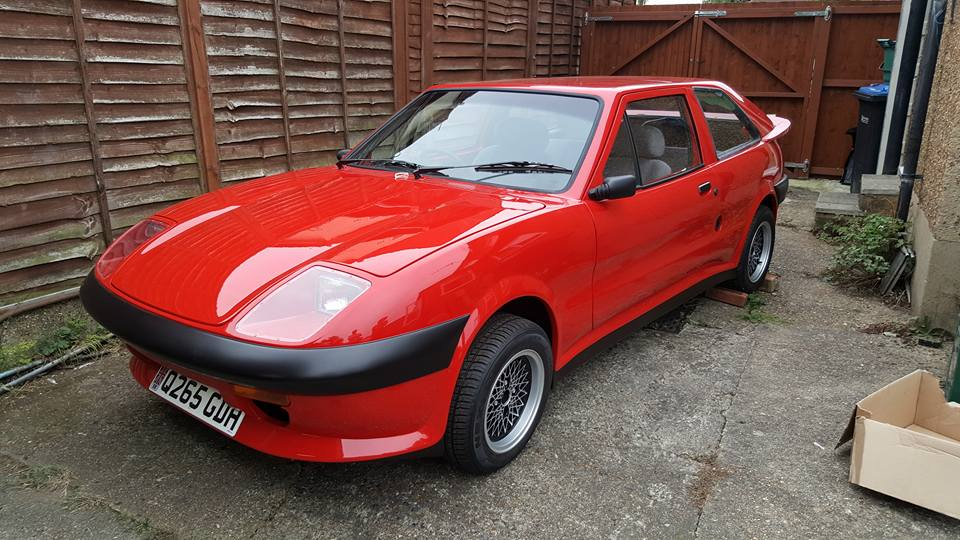
Q003 restoration progress as of 2016

The club also owns the last Mark 1 Coupé produced, chassis number 017. In 2015 a club member claimed to own chassis 002, which was believed to have been exported to the Isle of Man, and hence removed from the DVLA records. At the National Kit Car Motor Show in 2017 chassis number was validated by the Committee Members in the Quantum Owners Club who can now confirm this is the oldest surviving Quantum.

In 1991, the Quantum Mark 2 saloon was introduced, now based on the Ford Fiesta Mark 2 with the rear-end shape changed from a hatchback of the earlier car to a booted saloon. This led to far greater sales success a total of 199 saloon models being produced before that model also ceased production.

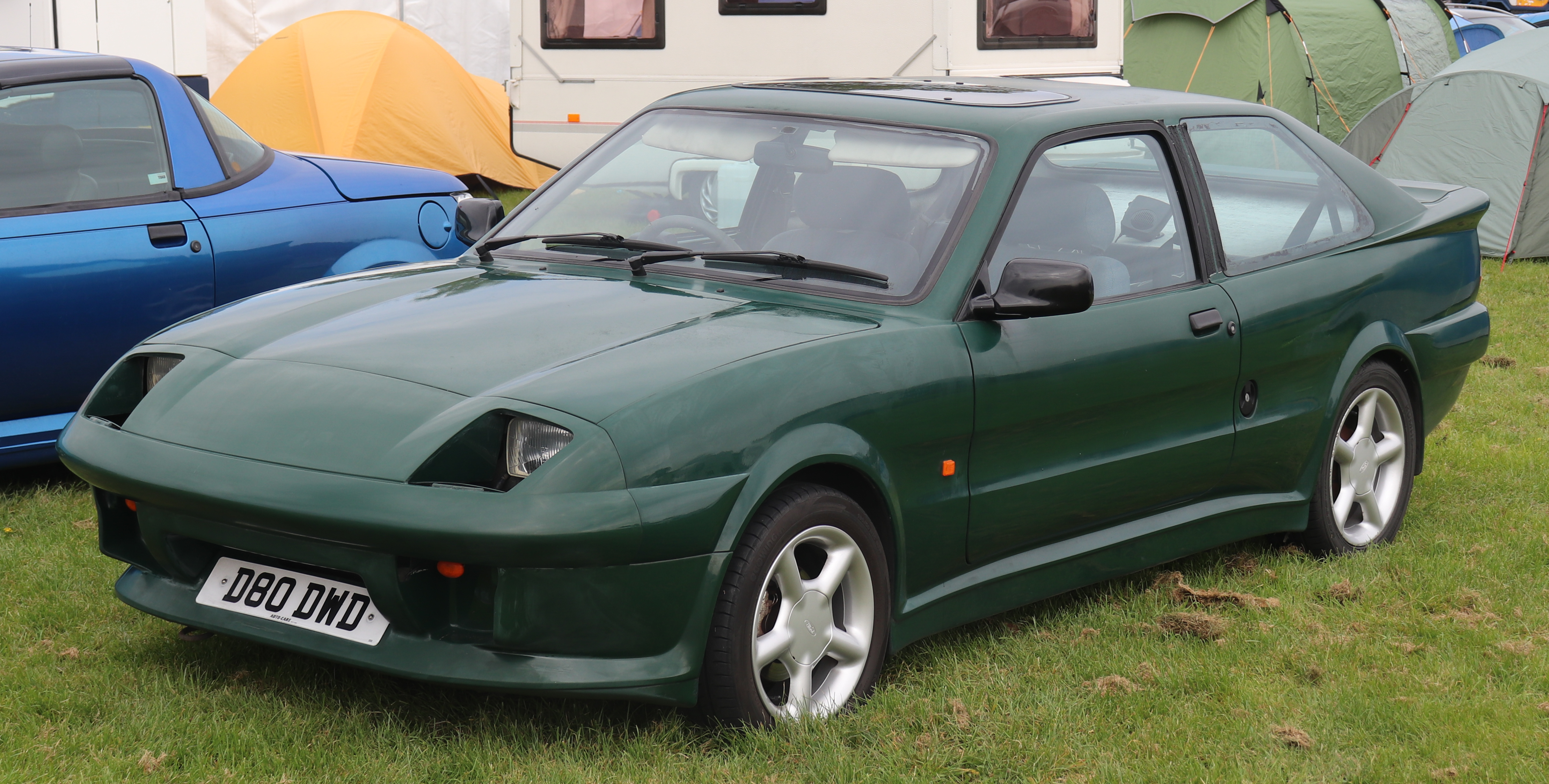
Quantum Saloon

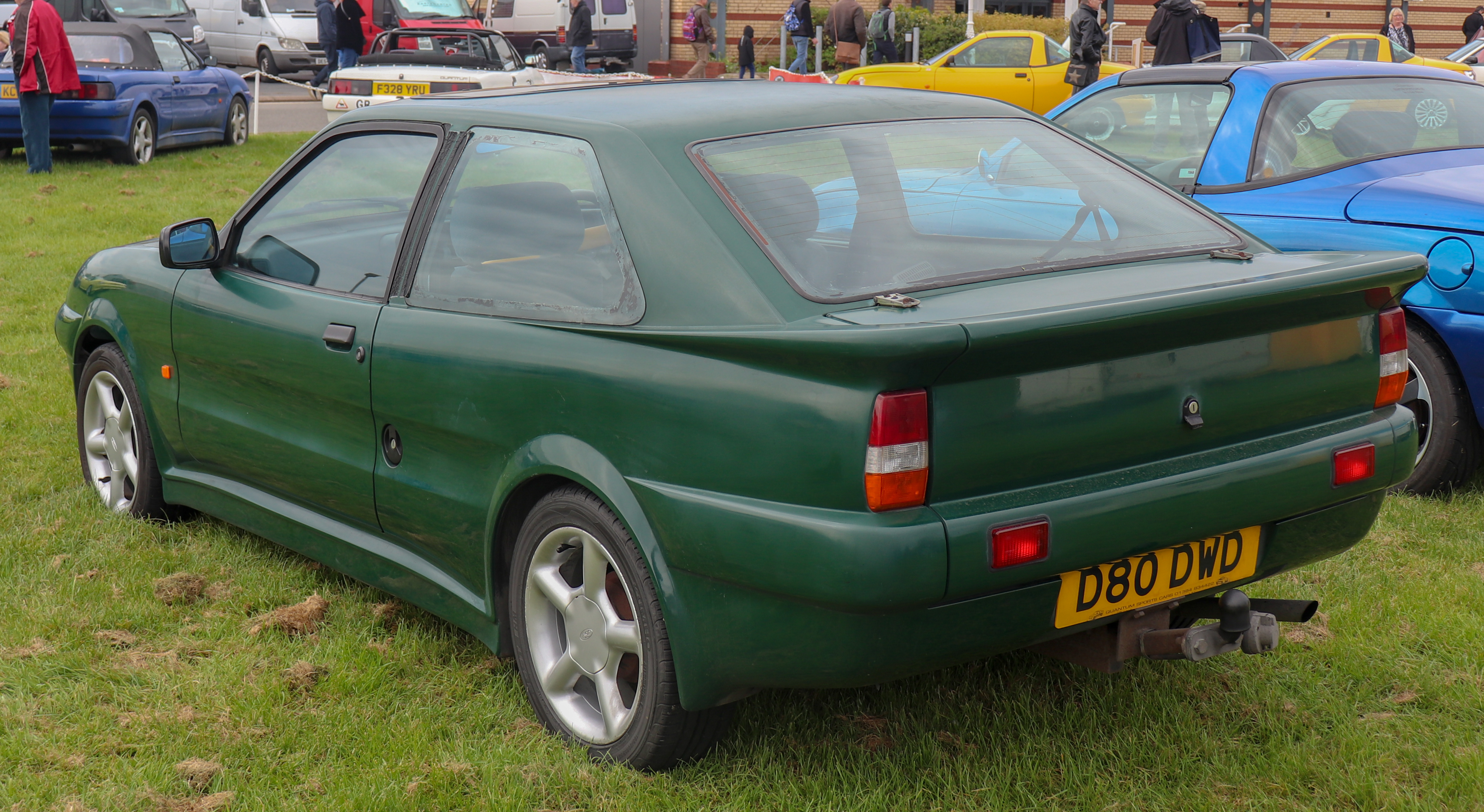
Quantum Saloon

== 2+2 Convertible ==
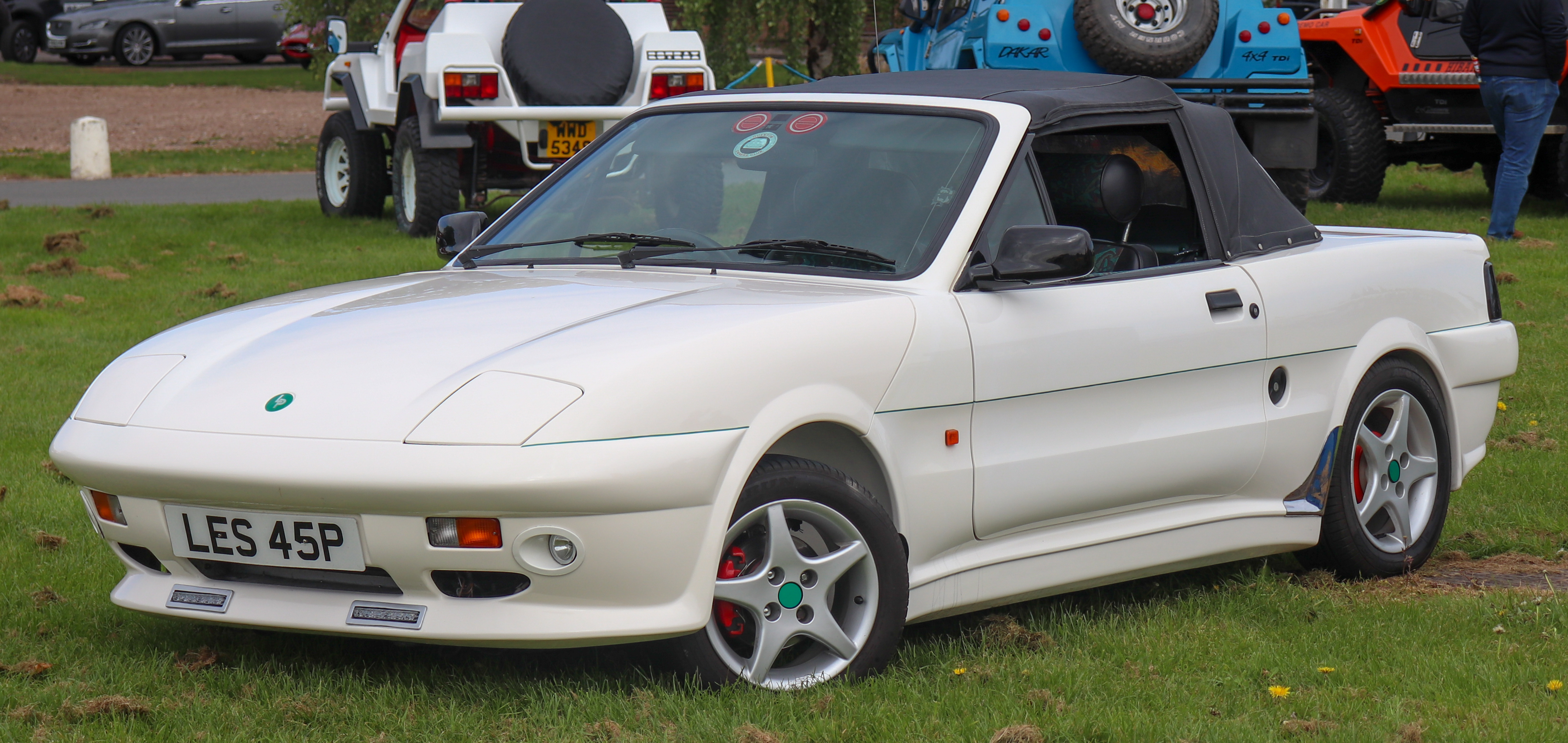
Quantum 2+2 convertible

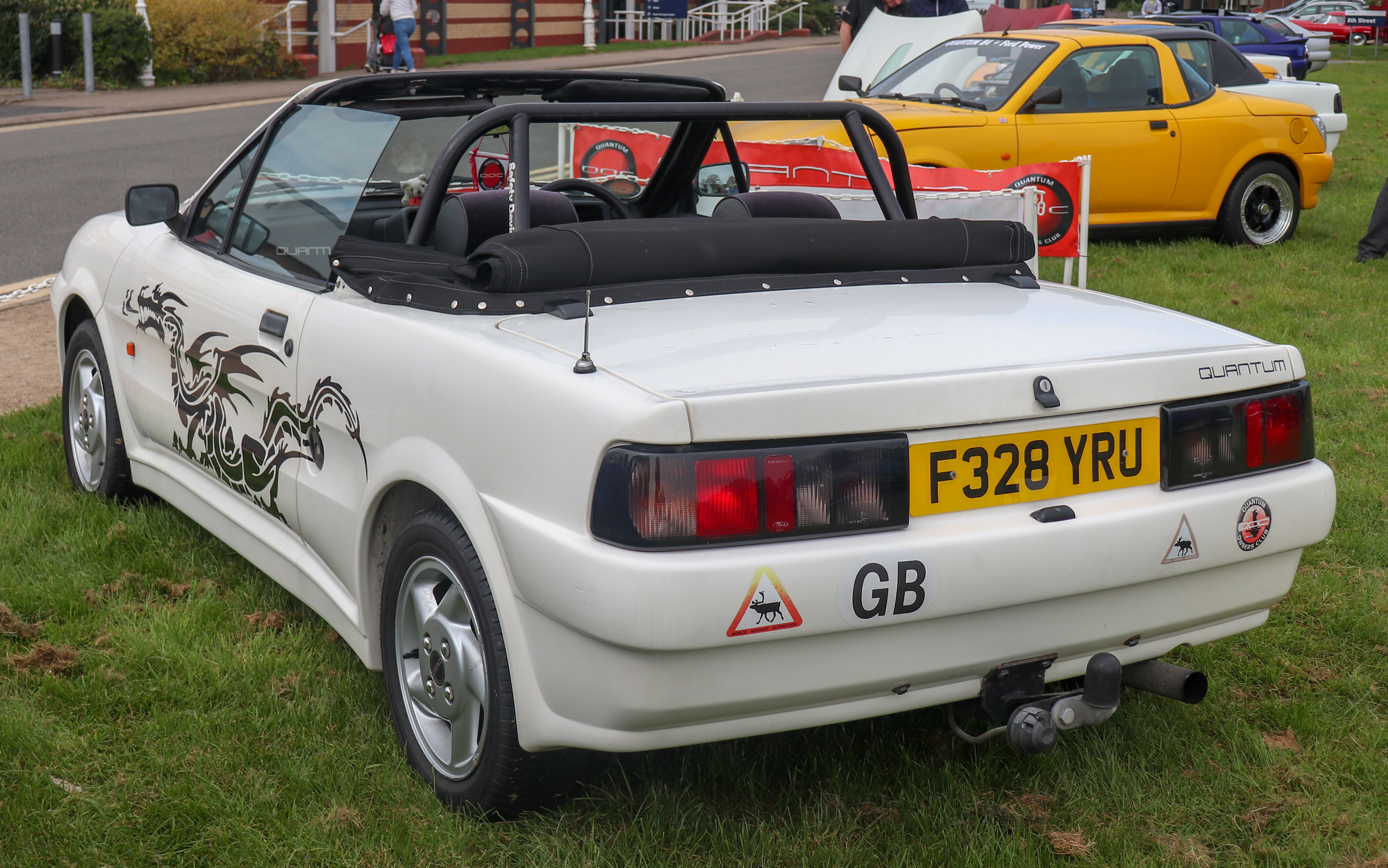
Quantum 2+2 convertible rear

By 1993, the firm was also offering a 2+2 convertible, also based on the Ford Fiesta Mark 2, which has been Quantum's most successful model with 431 examples built to date. Since the previous model had evolved, at the time the Wooldridges considered this to be their second model: numbering therefore began "Q2-001", which is now owned by a long term club member. One 2+2 (numbered Q2-275, with a two-litre engine rather than the more common Fiesta XR2 one, was featured in magazine articles and also loaned to the BBC's Top Gear for testing. Jeremy Clarkson and his wife drove the car and compared it favourably with mass-market alternatives such as the Mazda MX-5 during the test. The only criticism was based on the smell of new fibreglass.

The 2+2 is a practical open top sports tourer, with a large boot and spacious interior, while remaining light and sporty. The prototype, and a handful of early customer cars, had round headlights but the alternative nose with the drop down flaps was offered as production started and proved far more popular.

Chassis number 013, built by its owner in Pinner, Middlesex in 1993, one of two outside Europe, is now in New Zealand. A Ford 1800cc diesel was substituted for the original XR2 petrol engine, and a turbocharger has been added. The vehicle is in daily use, both as a family car and – with or without a trailer – for some of the parcel carrying trade of Allbays Transport, an Auckland North Shore passenger and courier goods transport business.

Chassis number 212, the other car outside Europe, is in Australia and currently being restored by its owner.

A handful of 2+2 LHD cars are in The Netherlands and one is in Germany. One owner has converted his car to full electric drive using a HPEVS AC50 motor with Curtis 1238 controller with Li battery pack front and rear. It also has power steering, Mk4 Fiesta dash, electric heating and many other upgrades.

The 2+2 is no longer made but plans had been mooted by the previous owners of QSC to further revise the design to offer more spacious rear seats, although to date this has not happened. About 455 2+2 cars were built.

== H4 ==
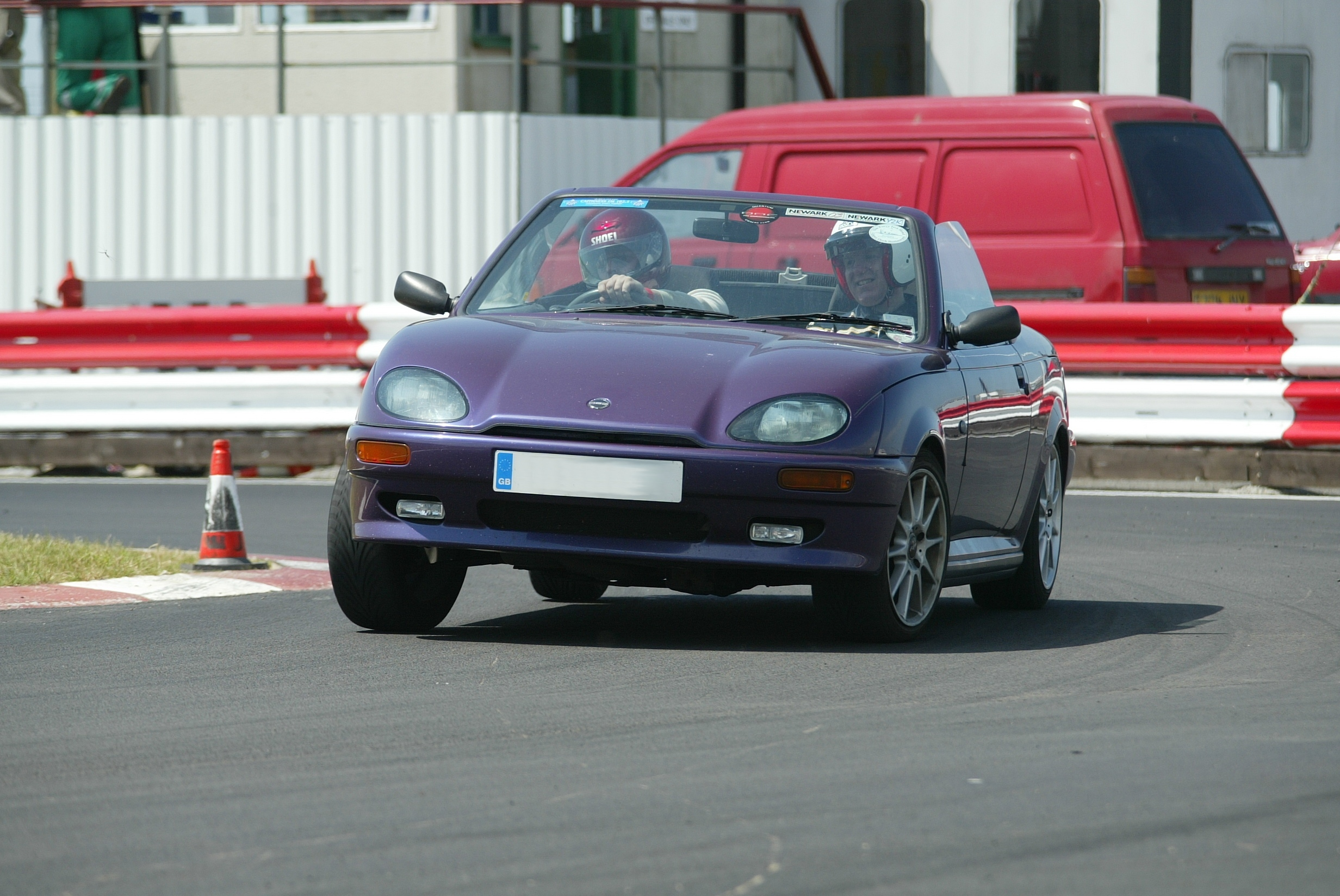
Quantum H4

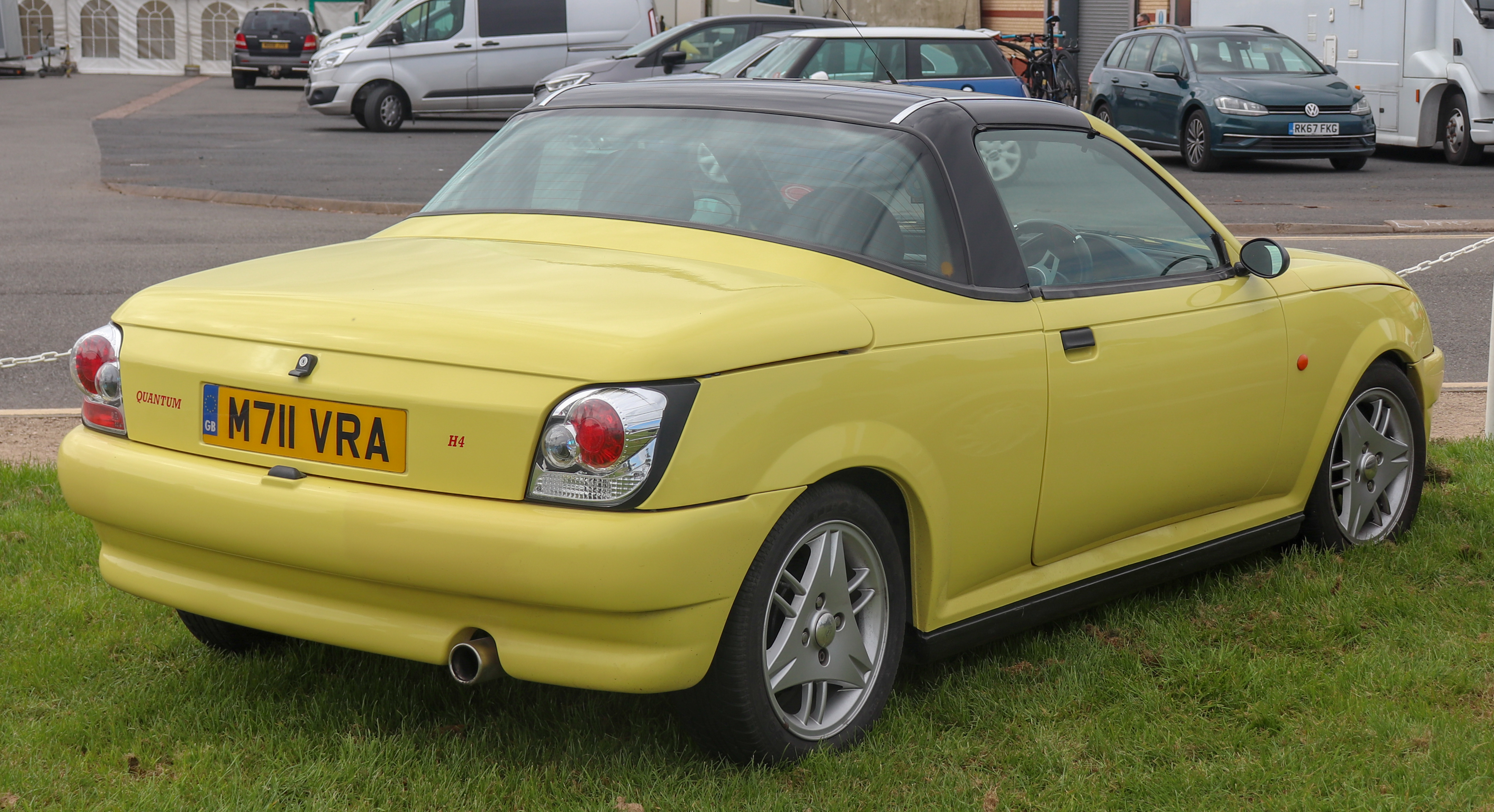
Quantum H4 rear with aftermarket rear lights

By the time this model emerged, Harvey Wooldridge now considered this to be the fourth car he had designed, hence the name H4. The H4 was based on the Ford Fiesta Mark 3 and used what is often erroneously referred to as a "surrey top" roof panel (which could be stored in the boot) and a rear section which could rotate into the bodywork to make a full convertible. At the beginning of development the curved glass for this rear section proved hard to source but eventually an Italian supplier was found. The completed H4 was reviewed by Top Gear magazine in March 1999.

The H4 was produced from 1998 until 2003, when the Wooldridge brothers announced that they were looking to sell the rights to manufacture Quantum cars. As part of the sale, the H4's moulds were sold to Iranian speciality vehicle manufacturers Renus (producing mainly ambulances and fire trucks, they also build other vehicles such as gully trucks). The company meant to produce the car as the "Renus Anna H4," equipped with various Ford Zetec engines of 105 to 130 hp (78 to 97 kW). The car was shown at the third International Auto Show in Tehran in 2002 and was also advertised by being used in the 2002 movie The Lucky Bride, but the company was unable to get the requisite licenses and production never started. Rights to build the H4 outside the Middle East were retained by Quantum, but without the costly moulds it is unlikely that production will be resumed in the UK. Only 215 H4 cars were made.

== Sunrunner ==
There was a change of ownership and a move to Devon in 2001, and around the same time the Sunrunner and XTreme models were introduced. The Sunrunner was a beach-buggy style of car based on the Mk3 Fiesta and brought in to add to the Quantum portfolio rather than designed in-house. It was rear-engined and rear wheel drive. It is still in production as Quantum Sports Cars showed a slightly revised car at the Stoneleigh National Kit Car Motor Show in May 2018.

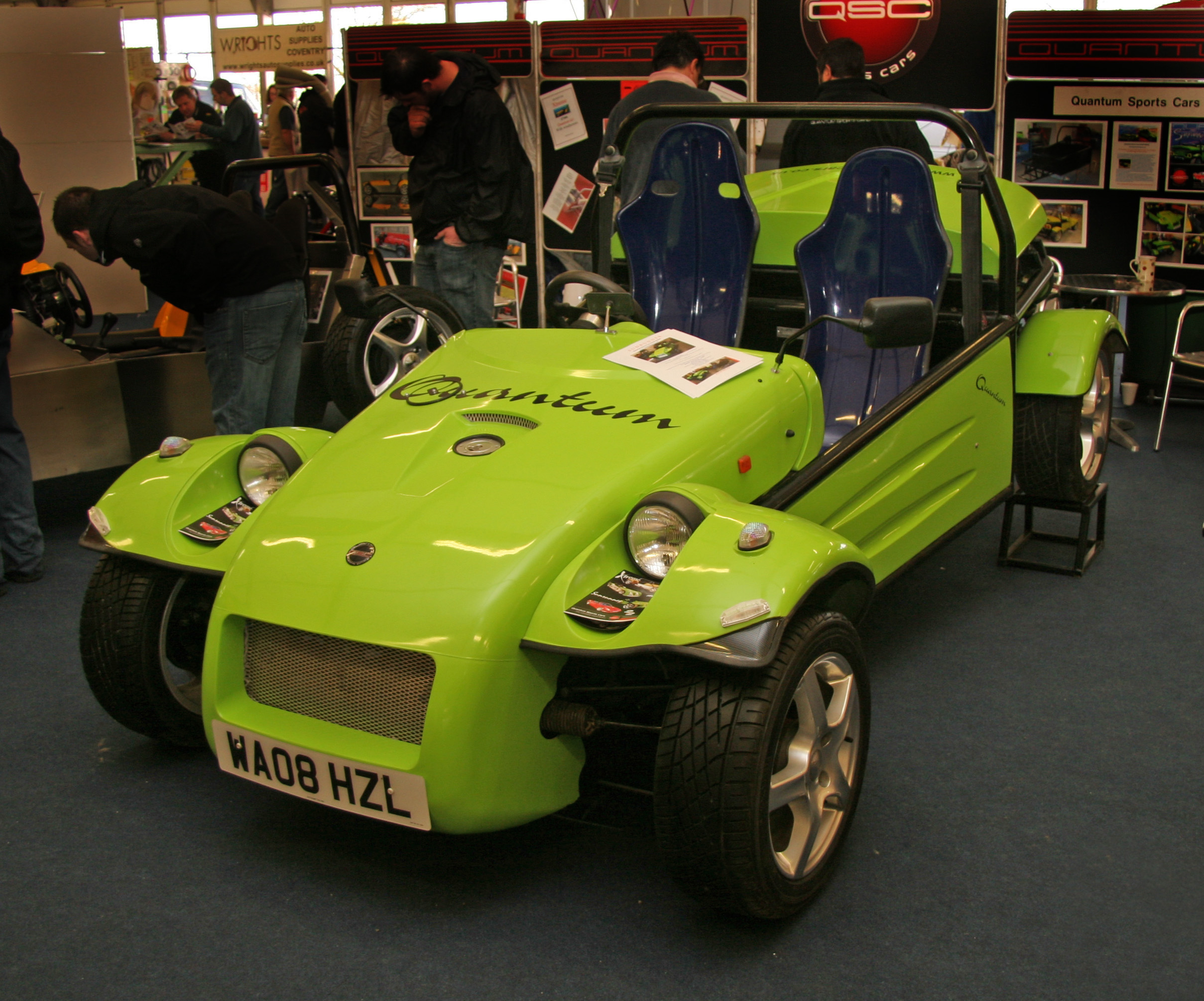
Quantum Sunrunner

== Xtreme ==
The Xtreme is still in production. It is a modern interpretation of the Lotus 7 two-seat sports car theme. Unusually for this type of car, it has practical features such as a sizeable lockable boot and more generous cockpit space. It has a stainless steel monocoque chassis and is the first Quantum to have rear wheel drive. It uses a Mk2 or newer Ford Sierra as a donor car.

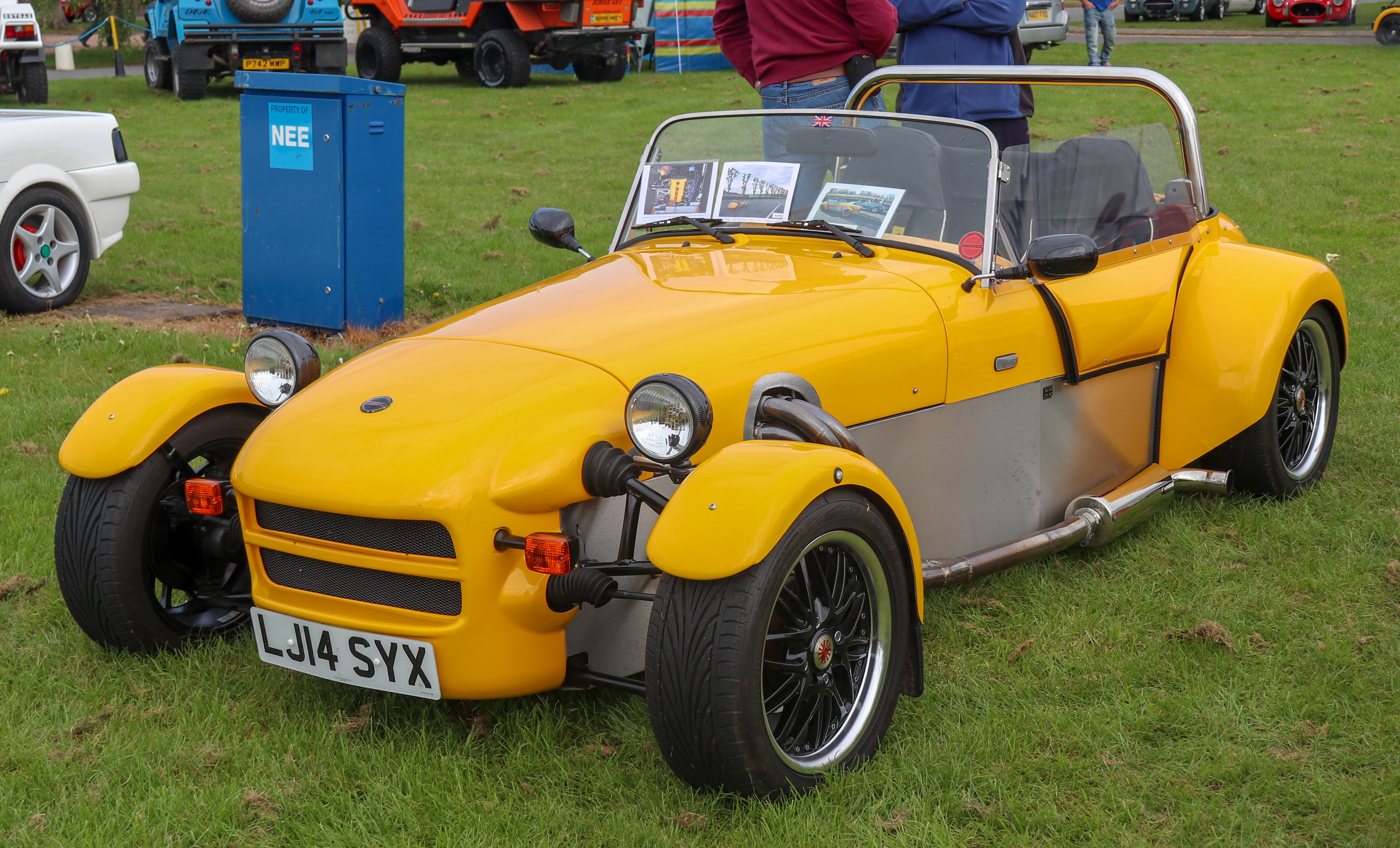
Quantum Xtreme

== Recent developments ==
In December 2010, it was announced that another change of ownership would move part of the business to Bristol under the ownership of Eddie Ruskin while XTreme production would remain in Devon. In February 2014, production moved again to Wrangaton, near Ugborough in Devon. As of May 2017, Quantum Sports Cars is under the ownership of Phoenix Automotive Developments and will be based in South Brent, Devon. This change in ownership has brought the various Quantum vehicles back to a single owner, with Saloon, 2+2, H4 and Xtreme parts being provided and Xtreme and Sunrunner kits. In 2020, the Replicar Project was taken over, and rebranded to the LMR 141 and the LMR 141R.
