= Lobini H1 =

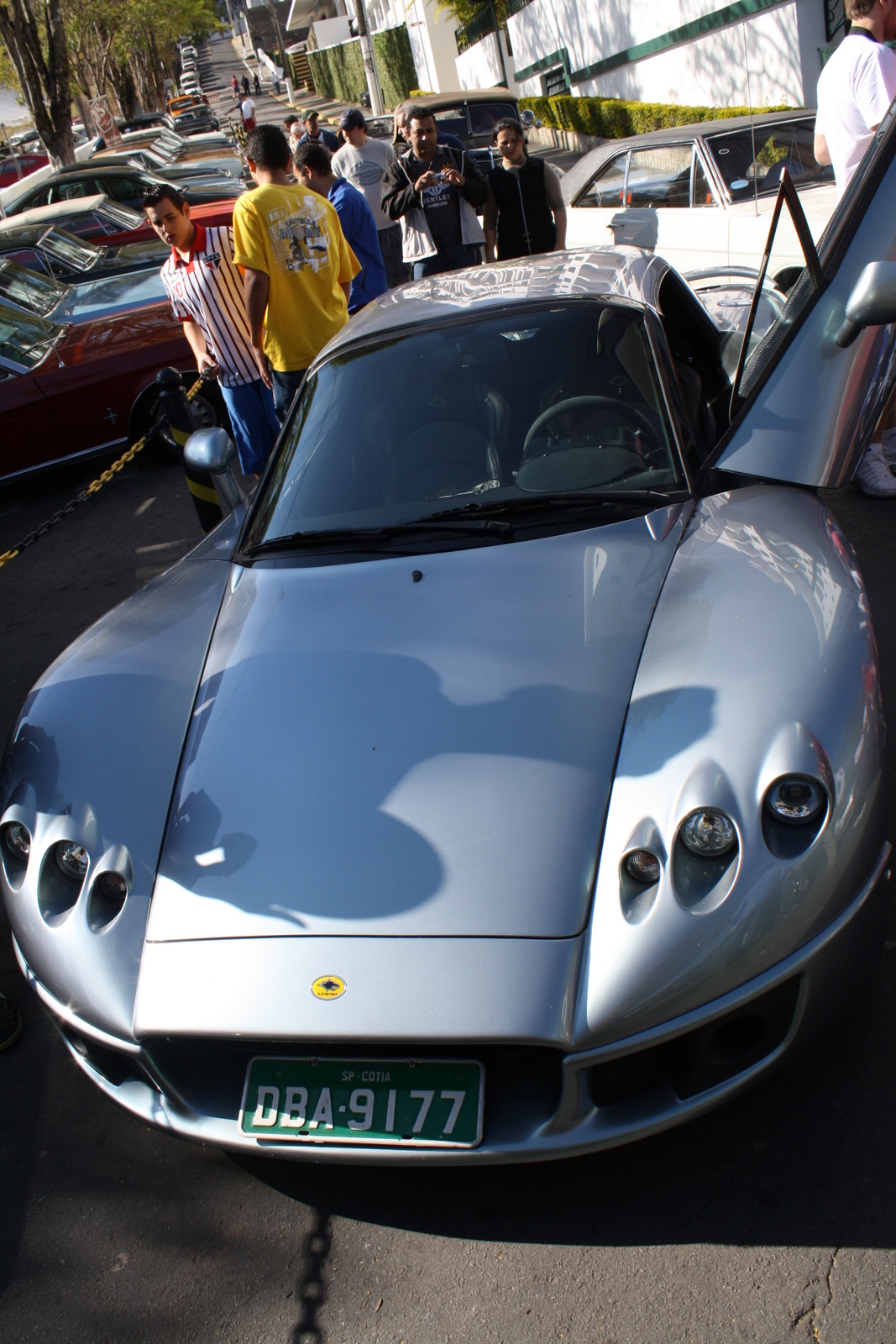
- Lobini H1

Overview
- Manufacturer: Lobini
- Production: 2005-2013

Body and chassis
- Class: Sports car
- Body style: 2-door targa 2-door coupé
- Layout: MR layout
- Related: Volkswagen Golf; Audi A3; Volkswagen Fox; SEAT Leon; Škoda Octavia

Powertrain
- Engine: 1.8 L 178 hp (133 kW; 180 PS) turbo I4 20V
- Transmission: 5-speed manual

The Lobini H1 is a sports car produced by the Brazilian automaker Lobini. It first appeared in 2005 and went through a minor redesign in 2007. It has a carbon steel tubular chassis and a fiberglass body shell. It makes use of a Volkswagen 1.8L turbocharged 20V engine, the same used in some versions of both Volkswagen Golf and Audi A3.

== Background ==
The Lobini H1 was idealized by José Orlando Lobo and Fábio Birolini, and is the first car to be produced by Lobini. It was designed by Graham Holmes, former Lotus designer, and was clearly inspired by the Lotus Elise. The car's prototype was first presented to the public at the 22nd São Paulo Motor Show, in 2002, and the first finished unit was sold in 2005. At that time, it was only available in the targa top configuration. In 2006, minor redesigns were announced for the 2007 model. Also, at the 26th São Paulo Motor Show a new coupé model was introduced and a racing model was shown.

Though it was well received by Brazilian enthusiasts, it is considered too expensive by most in that specific market. In fact, most of its production is directed towards the American and British markets.

== Design and features ==
The Lobini H1's design emphasizes aerodynamics and performance.

The H1 has an I4, 20V turbocharged 1.8L engine, the same as used in the Brazilian Volkswagen Golf GTI, transversally mounted in front of the rear axle. It attains 178 hp (133 kW; 180 PS) at 5700 rpm, and makes the H1 go from 0 to 100 km/h (62 mph) in 6.5 seconds. With this engine, the car has a maximum speed of 225 km/h (140 mph).

== Market and reception ==
While the Lobini H1 was well received by automotive enthusiasts, particularly for its sporty design and performance capabilities, it was considered expensive for the Brazilian market. As a result, a significant portion of its production was aimed at export markets, including the United States and the United Kingdom, where there was greater demand for niche sports cars.

== Production and legacy ==
Despite its niche market appeal, the Lobini H1 remains a milestone in Brazilian automotive history as one of the few sports cars produced in the country. It represents a blend of European-inspired design with Brazilian engineering.
