= Tehran Auto Show =

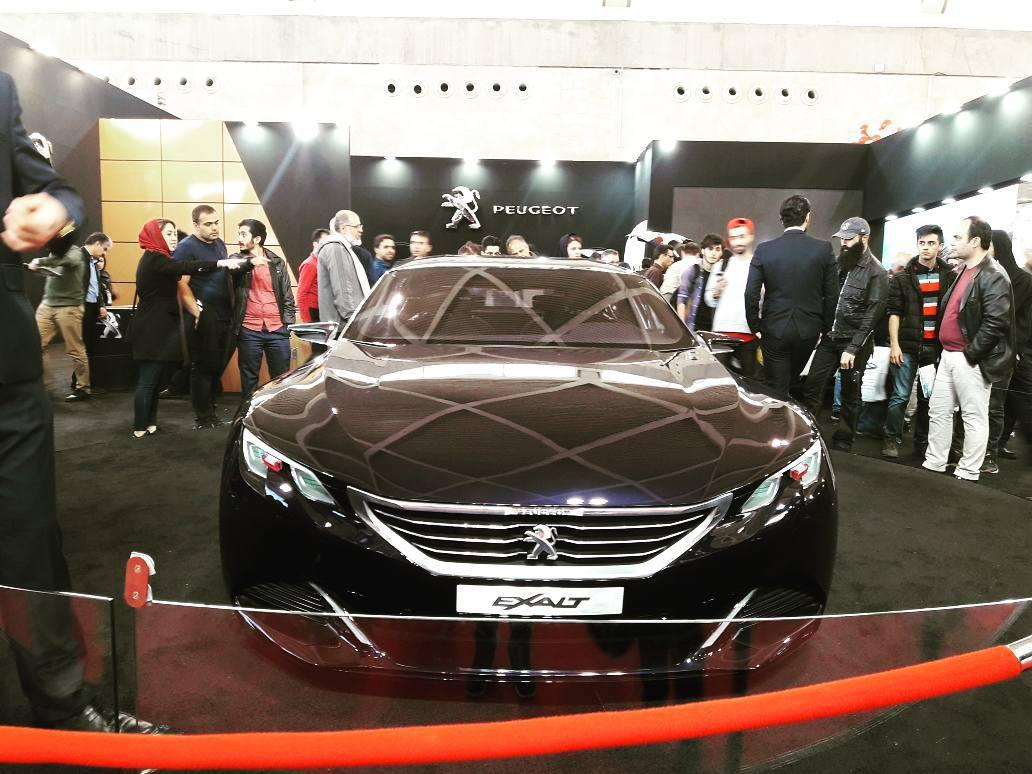
- Peugeot Exalt Concept at the 2017 Tehran Auto Show
- Status: Active
- Genre: Auto show
- Frequency: Annual
- Venue: Shahr-e- Aftab International Exhibition Center
- Country: Iran
- Next event: 8 January 2019 – 11 January 2019
- Area: 60,000 m^{2} (650,000 sq ft)
- Organiser: Hermes Business Idea
- Website: tehranautoshow.ir

The Tehran International Auto Show is an annual auto show that takes place at Shahr-e- Aftab International Exhibition Center, Tehran, Iran. The show attracts many major car manufactures, luxury tuning companies and other related companies, including supercar manufacturers.
