= Arrinera Hussarya =

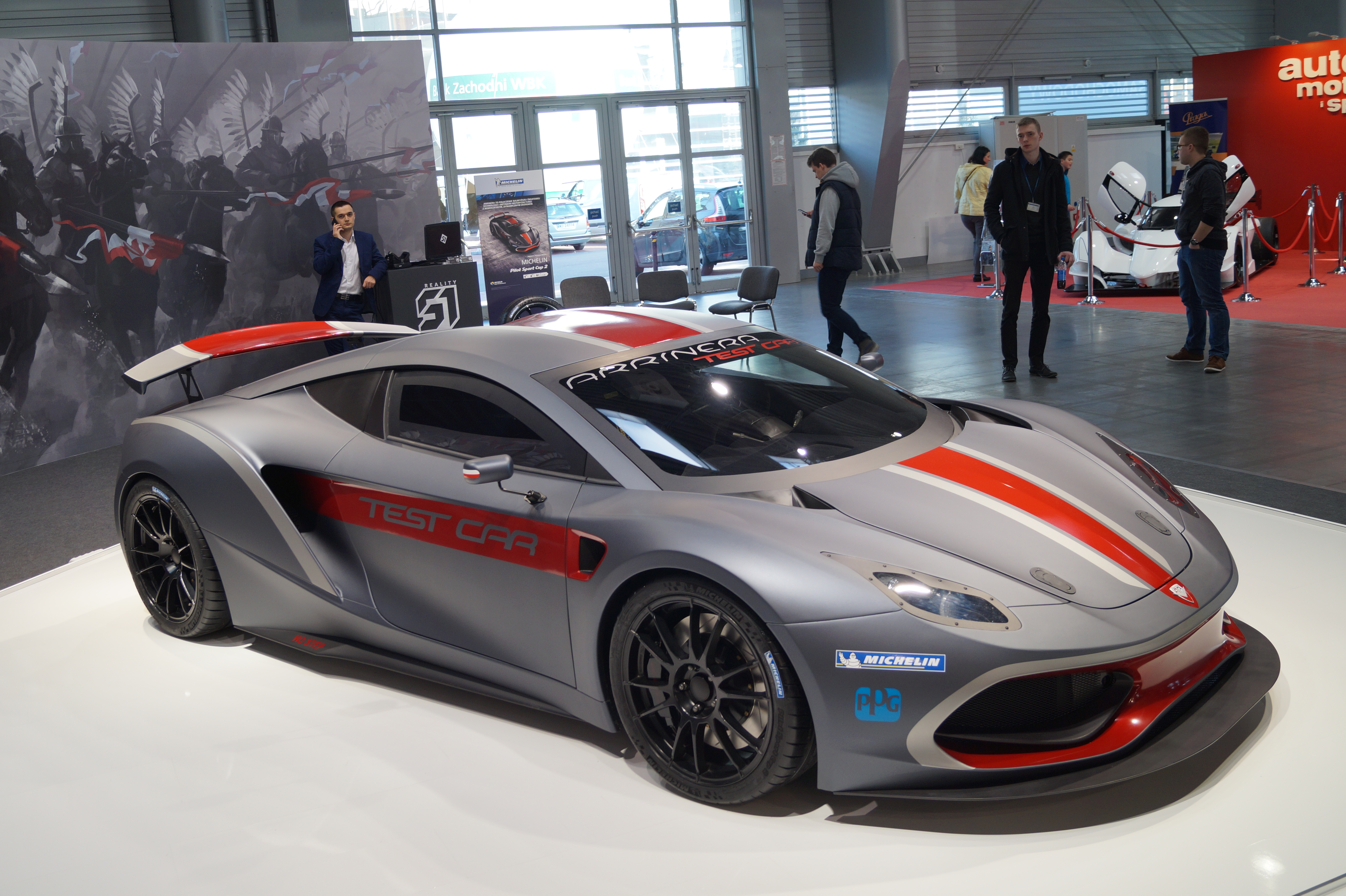
- Arrinera Hussarya test car at the Poznań Motor Show, 2015

Overview
- Manufacturer: Arrinera Automotive S.A. / Noble Automotive Ltd.
- Assembly: Gliwice, Poland
- Designer: Pavlo Burkatskyy

Body and chassis
- Class: Sports car (S)
- Body style: 2-door coupé
- Layout: Mid-engine, rear-wheel drive
- Doors: Scissor

Powertrain
- Engine: 6.2 L naturally aspirated LS3 V8
- Transmission: CIMA 6-speed manual

Dimensions
- Wheelbase: 2,695 mm (106.10 in)
- Length: 4,450 mm (175.20 in)
- Width: 2,056 mm (80.94 in)
- Height: 1,190 mm (46.85 in)
- Curb weight: 1,300 kg (2,900 lb) (dry)

The Arrinera Hussarya was a sports car project by Polish automotive manufacturer Arrinera Automotive. It was touted by Arrinera as the first supercar designed and engineered in Poland. It was named after Poland's Hussar cavalry. The project never went beyond the prototype stage as Arrinera went defunct in 2021 without entering serial production.

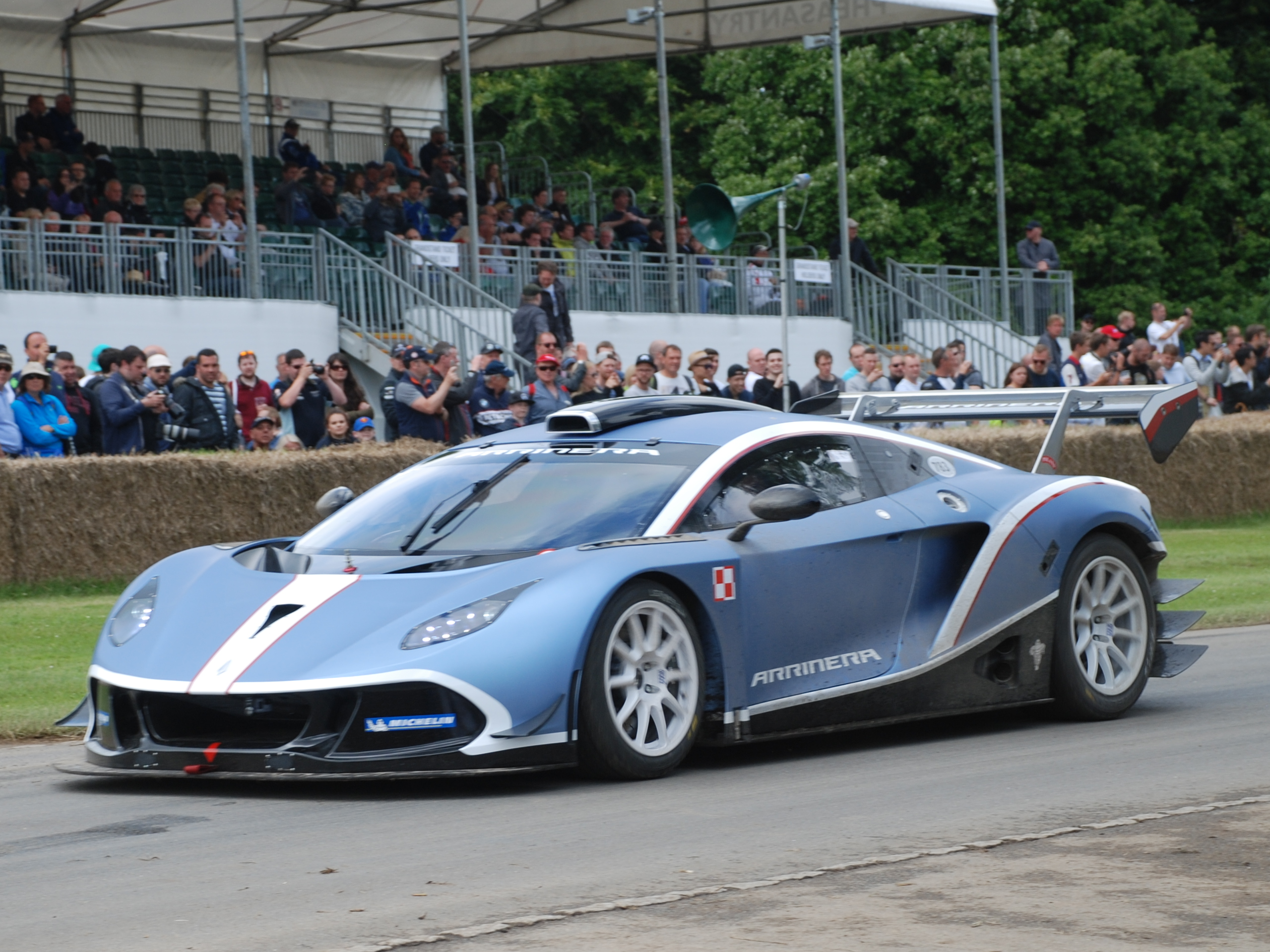
Arrinera Hussarya GT

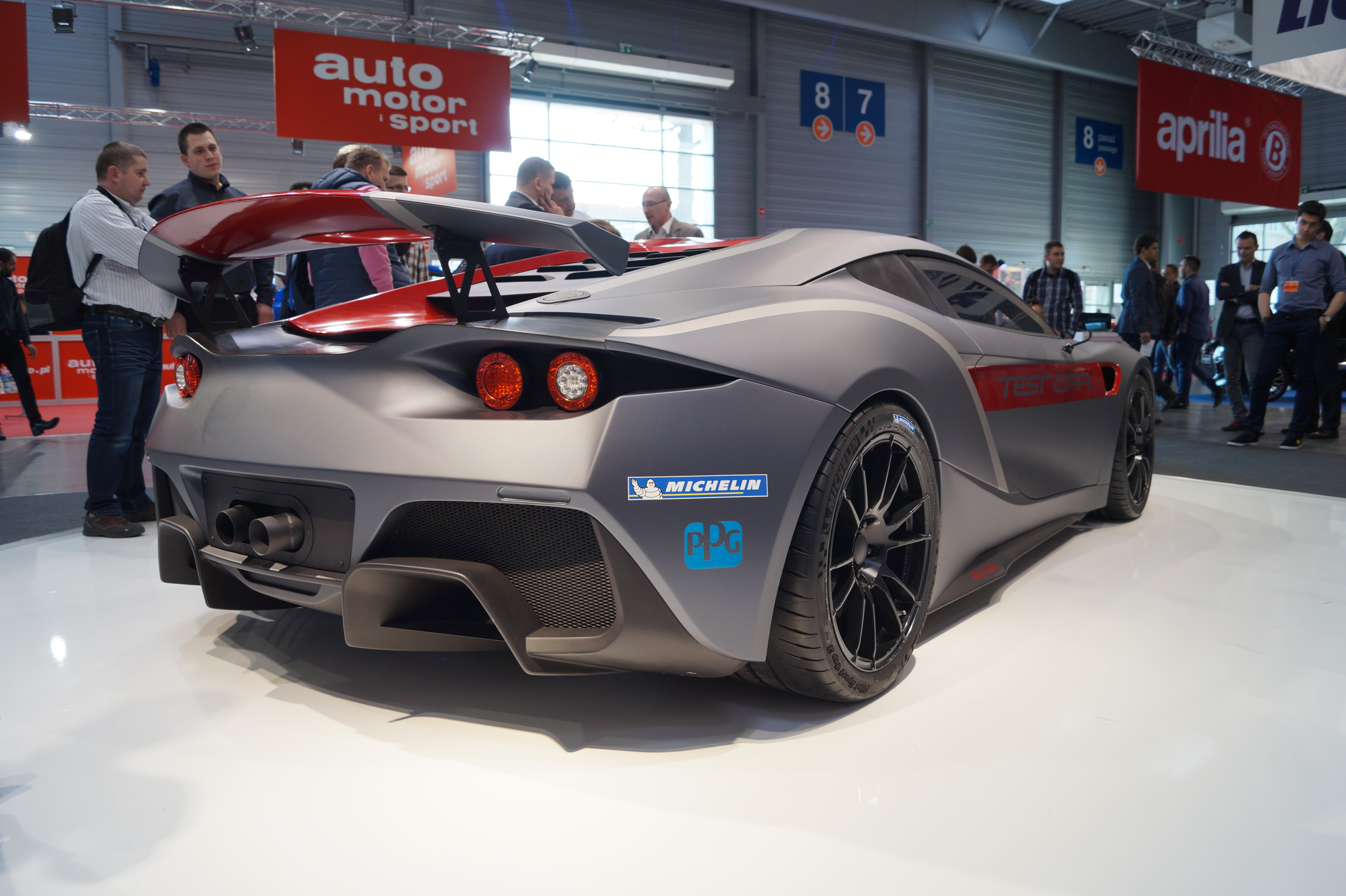
Rear view

== Prototype ==
The prototype of Arrinera premiered on 9 June 2011 to shareholders and investors. Some journalists gave the supercar the name "Venocara", although Arrinera Automotive has never officially used that name. It featured scissor doors for both the concept car and the production car.

In August 2012 Arrinera Automotive officially announced the name Hussarya for its new model. The name is derived from Poland's Hussar cavalry of the 16th century.

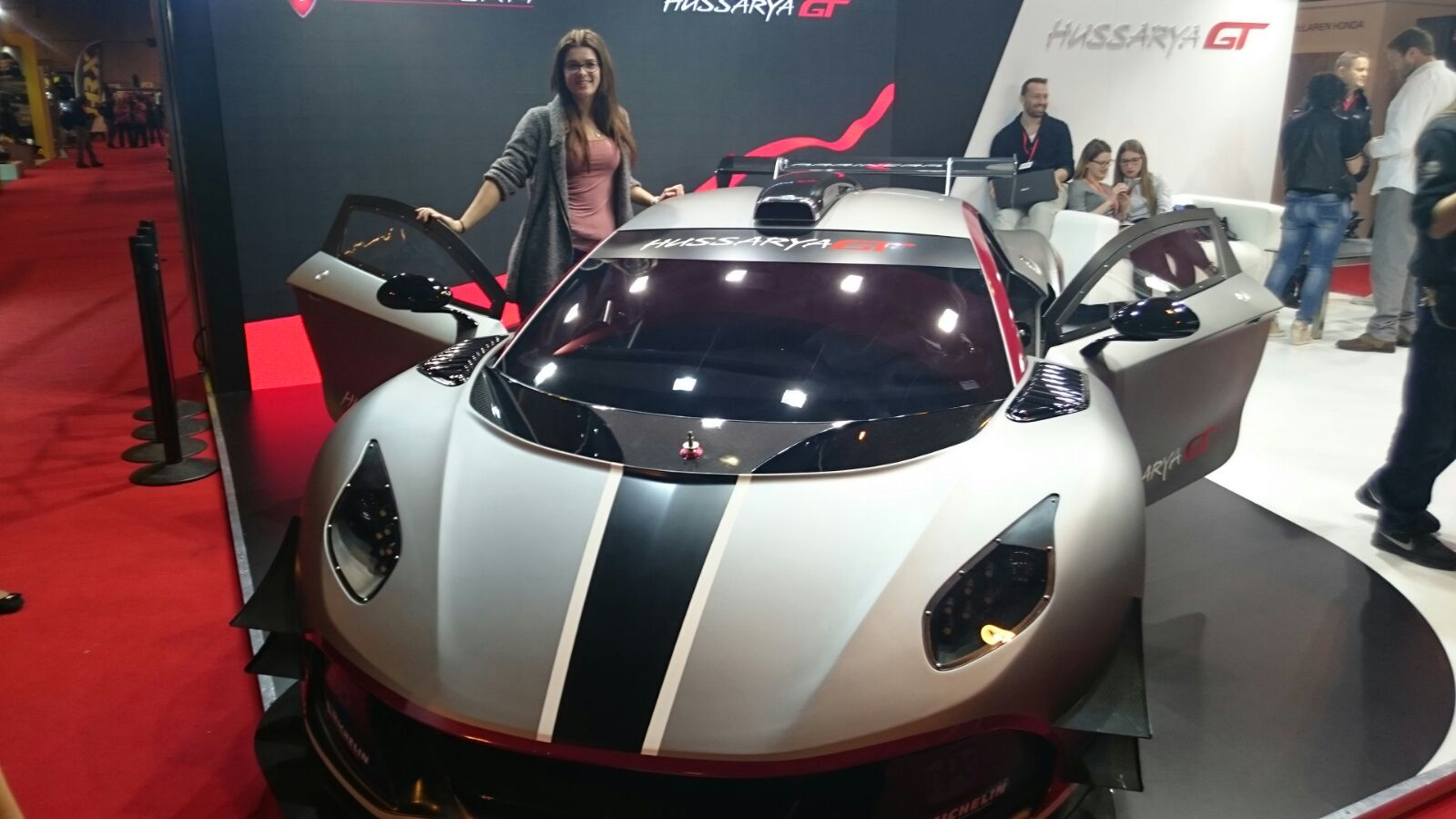
Arrinera Hussarya GT – 1.version

== Specifications ==
The Arrinera Hussarya 33 was to be tested with a mid-mounted General Motors-sourced supercharged 6.2-litre V8 producing 800 PS (588 kW; 789 bhp). This engine, based on GM's LS3 engine, drives the rear wheels.

Alleged performance
Top speed	350 km/h (217.5 mph)	0–100 km/h (0.0–62.1 mph)	3.0 seconds
0–200 km/h (0.0–124.3 mph)	9.0 seconds	0–200–0 km/h (0–124-0 mph)	13.0 seconds
Standing quarter-mile (402 m)		10 seconds	
Braking		133 m (from 200 km/h to 0)	

== Special editions ==
On 18 July 2012, it was announced that Arrinera planned to produce 33 units of a special "Series 33" version of the Hussarya, with exclusive designs on the exterior and the interior.

== Controversy ==
In 2012, Polish radio and online journalist Jacek Balkan asserted that the vehicle was not an original supercar but a low-cost replica of a Lamborghini using parts from an Opel Corsa and an Audi A6. Arrinera sued Balkan for slander, but the journalist was acquitted.

== Motorsport ==
In 2017, the Hussarya was driven in qualifying for the Britcar series race at Donington Park by Jonny MacGregor as an invitation entry. The car qualified fourth, but an engine blow-up meant it was unable to participate in the rest of the race weekend.
