= Frem F1 =

The Frem F1, designed by David Frem in 2008, is claimed to be the first "supercar" made in Lebanon and the Middle East. It was his senior project for the faculty of engineering in the American University of Science and Technology. The first iteration F1 was powered by a Volkswagen made 2.0-liter inline four-cylinder engine and an Audi transmission. The next version (called the Beirut Edition) unveiled in 2011, has a Chevrolet 5.6-liter engine. The company claims the F1 can reach a top speed of 124 miles per hour (200 km/h).
