= Chamonix NG Cars =

Brazilian automobile manufacturer

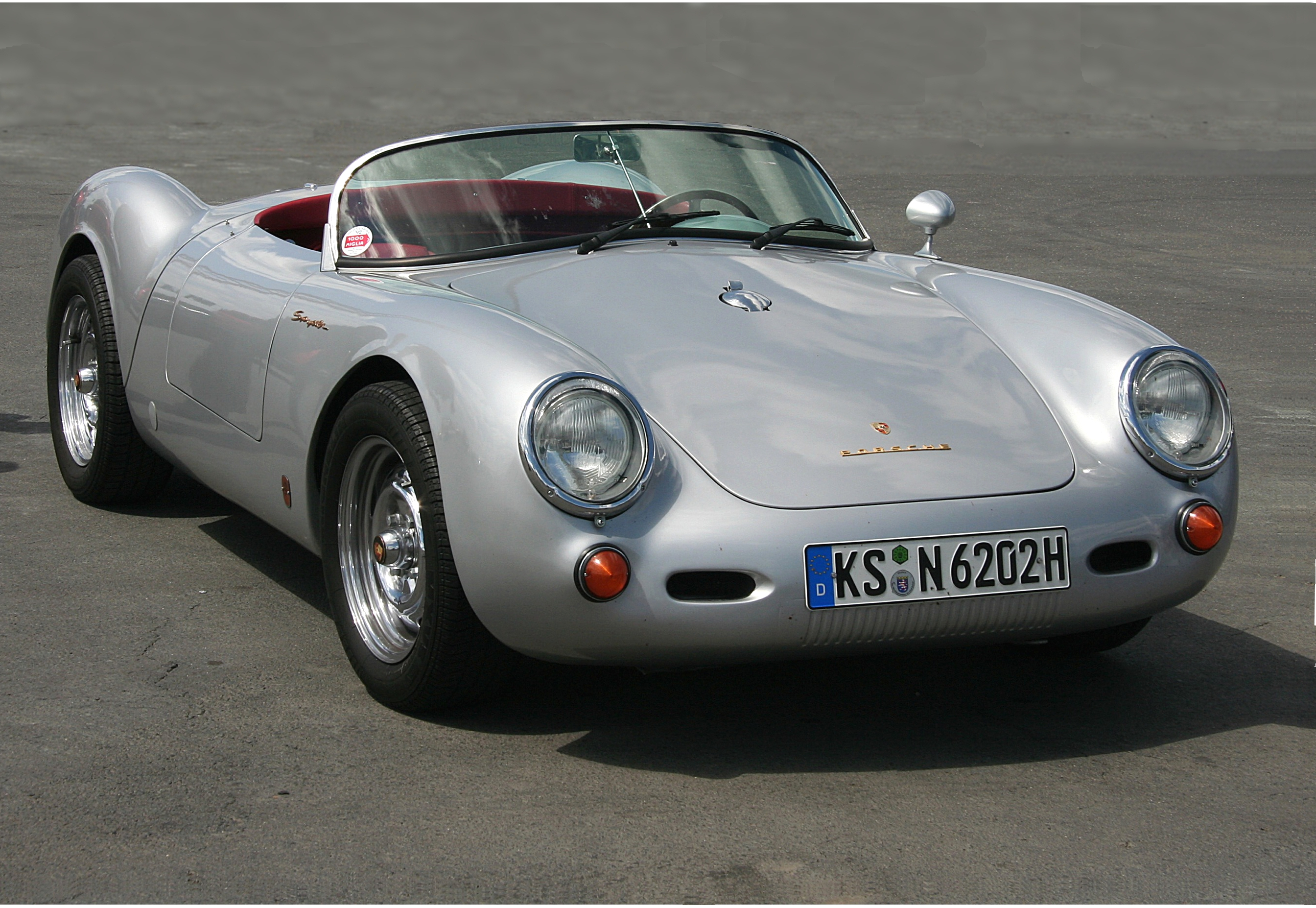
- Formerly: Chamonix Indústria e Comércio
- Industry: Automotive
- Founded: 1981
- Headquarters: São Paulo, Brazil
- Website: Website Athos cars

Chamonix NG Cars is a Brazilian automobile manufacturer based in São Paulo. Until about 2011 it was known as Chamonix Indústria e Comércio and located in Jarinu (SP). The "NG" in the company name stands for New Generation. The company was founded in 1981 by Milton Masteguin, formerly with Puma Cars as constructor of racing vehicles, and the US-American automotive engineer Chuck Beck.

The company was focused on creating 1950s style fibre glass replicas of Porsche cars with current Volkswagen technology. The company exported worldwide and body kits.

In 1982, Chamonix begins manufacturing replicas of the original open-body Spyder 550 with the participation of Mr. Milton Masteguin, who was a founding partner of the now-defunct Puma Automobile, and Mr. Chuck Beck, an aeronautical technician, race car designer Newton, Mr. Milton's son, worked at the Puma factory, was the owner of Chamonix and director responsible for the handmade manufacture of Porsche replicas.

In 1985, the Super 90 cabriolet was launched, a replica of the 1964 Porsche 356 C, the moulds and manufacturing templates for which had been acquired that year from CBP (the same car leased, launched and produced years earlier by Envemo). The Super 90 followed the Spyder in all its technical characteristics: fibre bodywork, tubular chassis, VW mechanical parts, boxer 1600 engines with 54 hp (later 65 hp), disc brakes at the front. Like the Spyder, the engine was mounted at the rear and the car had side windows and a convertible top. Following on from the Super 90 cabriolet was the Speedster, also produced from 1985, based on a Porsche sports model derived from the 356, launched in 1952. The Speedster had the same mechanics as the Super 90. From this period no less than 2500 vehicles, stamped Chamonix, were produced. The Spyder 550 and Speedster 356 were the main models produced.

The company was also involved in projects of Autolatina, Fiat, Lada and more recently in the development of the Lobini, a Brazilian sports car.
