= Arrinera =

Polish carmaker

Arrinera Automotive S.A.
- Industry: Automotive
- Founded: September 1, 2008; 17 years ago in Warsaw, Poland
- Founder: Łukasz Tomkiewicz
- Defunct: August 15, 2021
- Headquarters: Warsaw, Poland
- Area served: Worldwide
- Key people: Andrzej Wojno (Chairman)
- Products: Sports cars
- Website: www.arrinera.com

Arrinera Automotive S.A., was a Polish car manufacturer based in Warsaw.

== History ==
The company was established in 2008 by brothers Łukasz and Marek Tomkiewicz. In 2011 it announced its first proof-of-concept car, using a mid-engine, rear-drive layout. Their second prototype was presented in 2012, initially named the Venocara, later renamed as the Hussarya.

Arrinera developed a race variant of the car to GT3 racing specifications, the Hussarya GT. It was first shown at the Autosport International automotive show in Birmingham, UK, in January 2016. In June of the same year, the Hussarya GT, running in the supercar class, became the first Polish car to take part in the Goodwood Festival of Speed.

== Cars ==
=== Hussarya GT ===
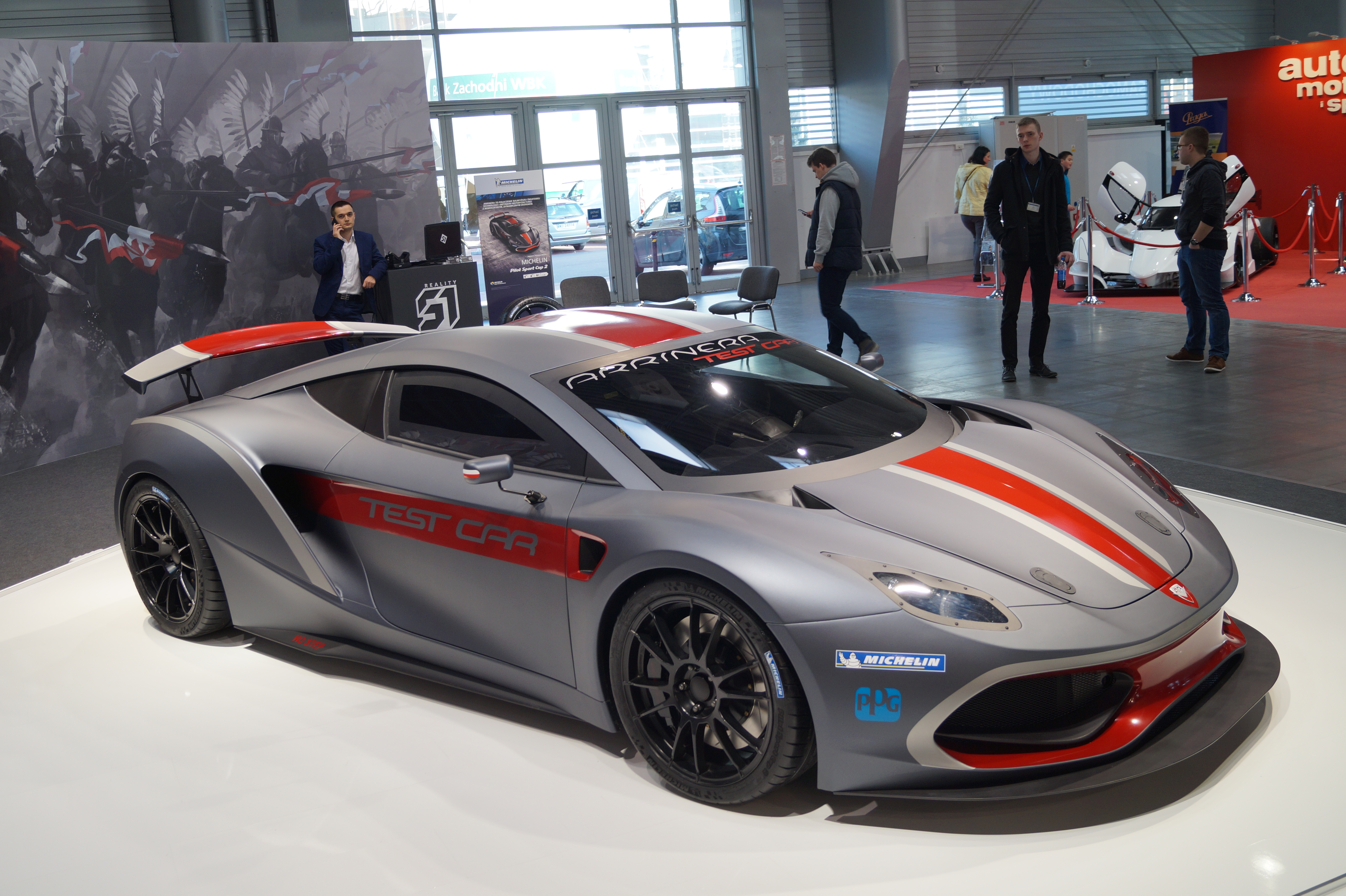
Arrinera Hussarya at the Poznań Motor Show 2015

The Arrinera Hussarya GT is a racing car compliant with FIA GT3 rules. It is powered by a General Motors LS7 V8 engine, as used in the Chevrolet Corvette, pushing out 500 bhp, with a six-speed sequential racing gearbox operated by paddle shifters. It features a modular steel spaceframe chassis, pushrod suspension, 380 mm brake discs, ABS and traction control.

The car's body was designed by Pavlo Burkatskyy with aerodynamics by Janusz Piechna of Warsaw University of Technology, and the mechanicals engineered by Krzysztof Stelmaszczuk. It is built in Cambridgeshire.

The race car was tested in 2016 by Anthony Reid at Snetterton and Donington Park circuits.

Arrinera entered a Hussarya GT in the DMV GT & Touring Car Cup round in Hockenheim in April 2017. In the first of the weekend's races the car finished 22nd of 24 runners, with a fastest time 20 seconds slower than the winner. In the second race the car retired with an alternator failure.

In September 2017 the car was entered for the Donington round of the Britcar championship, driven by Jonny MacGregor. During qualifying the car's engine blew and it was withdrawn from the event.
