= Lobini =

- Industry: Automotive
- Founded: 1999
- Headquarters: Cotia, São Paulo, Brazil
- Website: www.lobini.com.br

Lobini was a Brazilian automobile manufacturer. The company produced a sports car called the H1 which uses Audi engines and fiberglass bodies produced by fellow Brazilian sports car manufacturer Chamonix.

Lobini, named after founders José Orlando Lobo & Fábio Biroliini, was a project created in 1999 aimed at developing the best Brazilian sports car with a technology to be compared with the international vehicles of the same category.

The Lobini H1 was a success in "Salão do Automóvel 2002". The company has recently shipped one of its cars to England, and it has been working with Lotus for the technical validation of Lobini in Europe.

Lobini was bought by Brax Automóveis in 2006. The same year they presented the new 2007 Lobini H1 at the "Salão do Automóvel 2006". The car has a removable hard-top roof, redesigned front with new headlights and an aerodynamic kit. On the inside the Lobini H1 comes with leather seats available in light gray, dark gray or black.

The Lobini H1 cost 170,000 BRL (~ $90,000) and comes standard with a roll-over bar, sound system, air conditioning, electric windows and adjustable seats and steering wheel. Optional equipment include: Xenon headlights, GPS, DVD, parking sensor, tire pressure alarm and personalized colors.

Lobini was formerly distributed in the UK by Lifestyle Automotive Ltd.

== Production ==
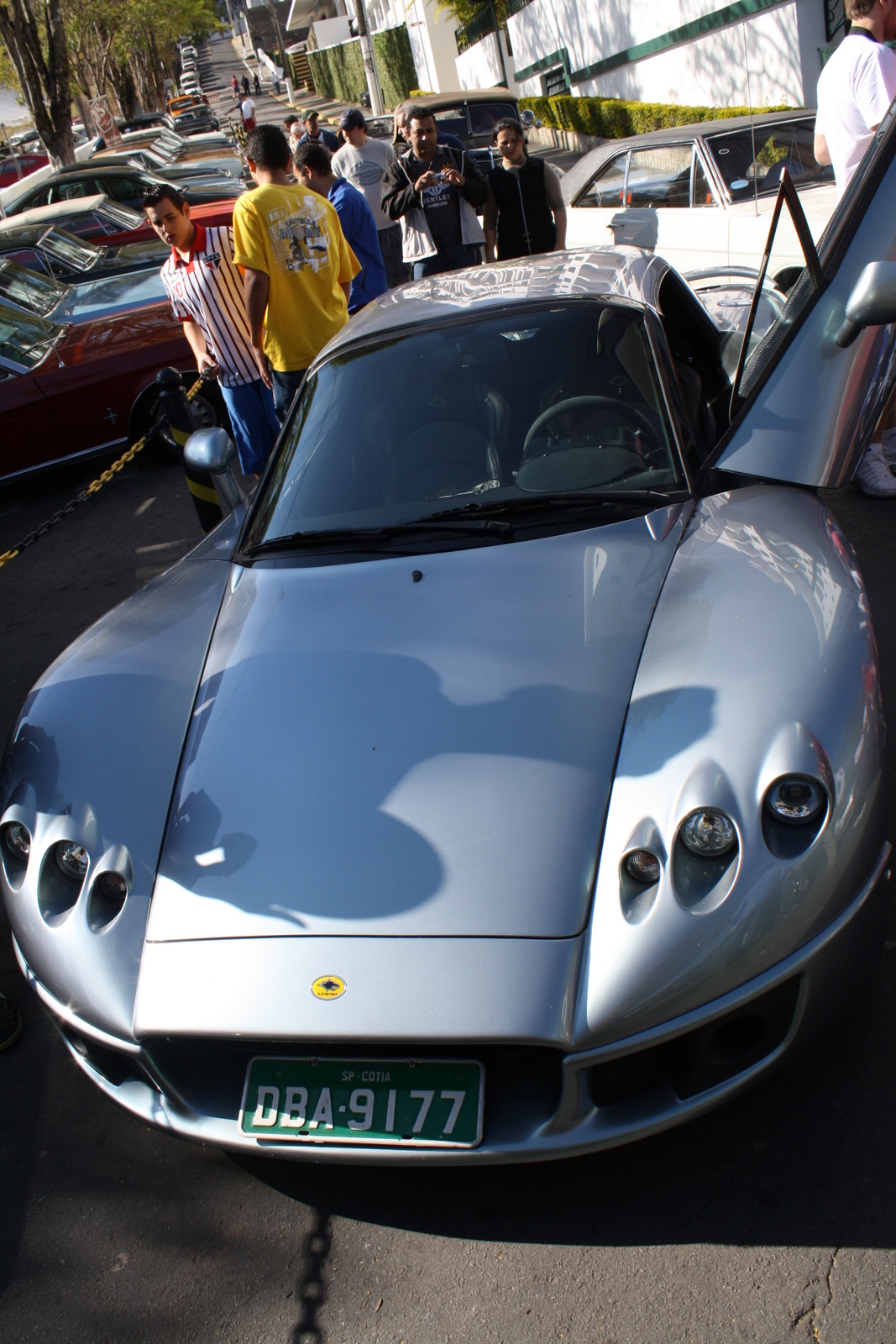
Lobini H1

Year	Production (units)
2000^{[a]}	1
2001	0
2002^{[a]}	1
2003^{[a]}	1
2004	0
2005	?
2006	?
2007	17
2008	7
2009	5
2010	11
2011	27
Total	69

- a. As production figures do not include 3 prototypes.
