= Sebring (sports car) =

British electric sports car manufacturer

Sebring Design Ltd.
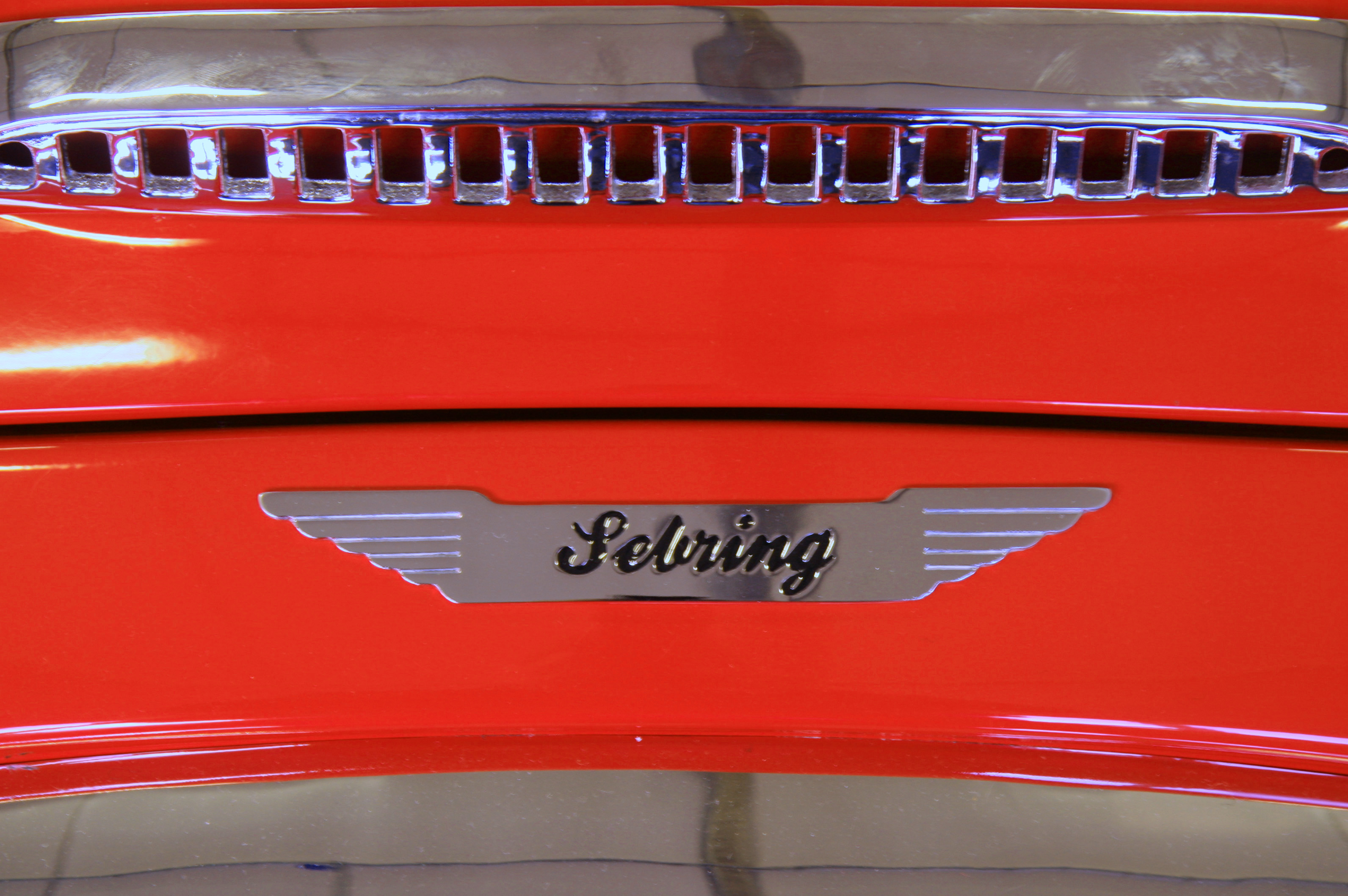
- Company type: Electric sports car manufacturer
- Industry: Automotive
- Founded: 1994
- Headquarters: Moreton-in-Marsh, United Kingdom
- Products: Cars
- Website: http://www.sebring-design.com

Sebring is a British electric sports car manufacturer, based near Moreton-in-Marsh, Gloucestershire. They produce a range of retro-inspired open-top electric sports cars and a coupe.

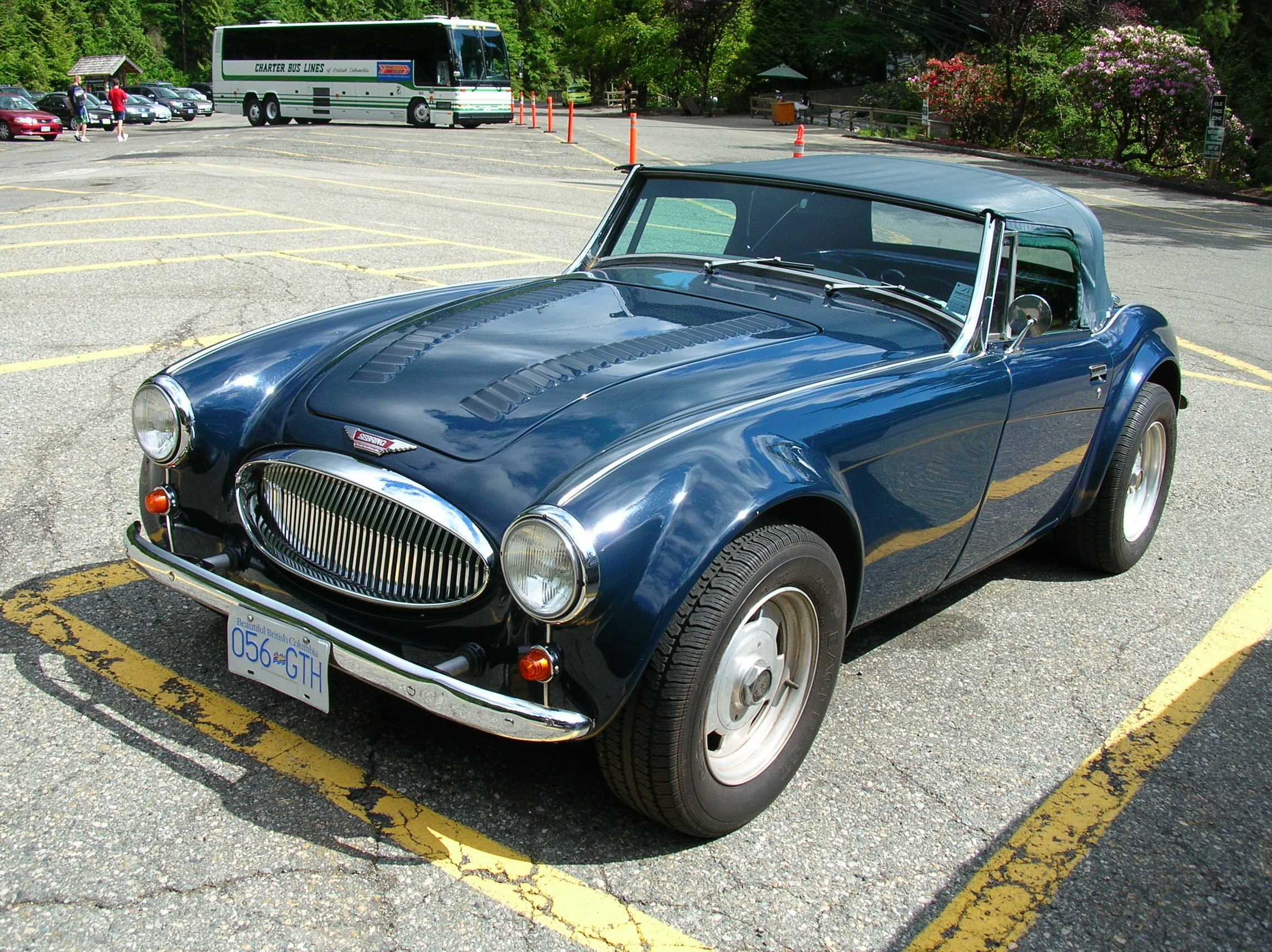
Sebring Sports Car

== Range ==
Sebring hand builds a range of electric sports cars using fibreglass bodywork, the style reminiscent of the classic Austin-Healey 3000 sports cars produced between 1959 and 1967 and the Porsche 356 (coupe and speedster). They are working towards innovative sustainable materials for their bodywork and expect to release exciting new materials into their production from mid-2026.

The name derives from the Sebring International Raceway in the US, at which Austin-Healey cars were very successful.

Previously a kit car company, Sebrings are now exclusively factory built in Draycott, near Moreton-in-Marsh, Gloucestershire.

The brand was acquired in 2021 by the Vital Spark Group Ltd. On 5 July 2023 the company and Vital Spark Group were renamed Sebring Works and is part of the Sebring Group (which includes Sebring Design, Sebring Composites and Sebring Marine) with Sebring Live Action Vehicles and Sebring Prestige as further brands.
