= Proteus (disambiguation) =

Proteus is an early Greek water god.

Proteus may also refer to:

== Mythological and historic figures ==
- Proteus (mythology), several other figures
  - Proteus (king of Egypt)
- Peregrinus Proteus (c. 95 – 165 AD), Greek Cynic philosopher

== Arts and entertainment ==
=== Fictional characters ===
- Proteus (The Two Gentlemen of Verona), in William Shakespeare's play
- Dr Paul Proteus, in Player Piano by Kurt Vonnegut
- Prince Proteus of Syracuse, in the 2003 film Sinbad: Legend of the Seven Seas
- Proteus, the Prime Minister in The Apple Cart by George Bernard Shaw
- Proteus (Marvel Comics)
- Proteus (DC Comics)

=== Fictional entities ===
- Proteus IV, a supercomputer in the Dean Koontz novel and film Demon Seed
- Proteus, the Frankenstein's second monster in the TV show Penny Dreadful
- Proteus, a submarine in the 1966 movie Fantastic Voyage
- Proteus, a spaceship in the 1998 film Lost in Space
- Proteus, a narrow-gauge engine in Thomas & Friends

=== Film and television ===
- Proteus (2003 film), a romantic drama
- Proteus (2004 film), an animated documentary
- "Proteus", a 1995 an episode of X-Men: The Animated Series
- "Proteus", a 2013 episode of the TV series Person of Interest
- "Proteus", a 2005 episode of New Captain Scarlet

=== Gaming ===
- Proteus (role-playing game), 1992
- Proteus (video game), 2013
- Proteus, a chess-variant game by Steve Jackson Games

=== Other uses in arts and entertainment ===
- "Proteus" (Ulysses episode), an episode in James Joyce's novel Ulysses
- Proteus (West novel), by Morris West, 1979
- Proteus (play), a 5th century BC play by Aeschylus, part of the Oresteia

== Businesses and organisations ==
- Proteus Airlines, a French regional airline
- Proteus Gowanus, a gallery and reading room in Gowanus, Brooklyn, New York, US
- Krewe of Proteus, a parade krewe at New Orleans Mardi Gras
- Studio Proteus, a Japanese manga import, translation and lettering company

== Science and technology ==
=== Biology and medicine ===
- Amoeba proteus, a large species of amoeba
- Proteus (amphibian), or olm, an aquatic salamander
- Proteus (bacterium), a genus of bacteria
- Proteus syndrome, a rare congenital disorder
  - Proteus-like syndrome

=== Computing ===
- Proteus (programming language)
- Proteus Design Suite, a proprietary software tool suite for electronic design automation

=== Other uses in science and technology ===
- Proteus, a synonym for prima materia in alchemy
- Proteus (moon), a natural satellite of Neptune
- Proteus (satellite), a French multimission satellite platform

== Transportation and military ==
- Bluebird-Proteus CN7, a land speed record-breaking car
- Proteus (watercraft), an experimental vessel by Marine Advanced Research
- HMS Proteus, the name of several ships
- USS Proteus, the name of several ships
- Proteus, a type of diver propulsion vehicle
- Saturn-class tugboat, or Proteus, a series of Soviet/Russian tugboats
- Scaled Composites Proteus, an experimental aircraft
- Bristol Proteus, a turboprop engine
- Leonardo Proteus, an unmanned rotorcraft

== Other uses ==
- E-mu Proteus, a range of digital sound modules and keyboards
- Proteus Lake, in Greenwich Island, Antarctica

== See also ==
- Protea (disambiguation)
- A. proteus (disambiguation)
- Protei (disambiguation)
- Proetus, the name of several Greek mythical characters
- Proetus (trilobite), a genus of trilobite
- Charles Proteus Steinmetz (1865–1923), German-American mathematician and electrical engineer
- DSR Proteus-Eretes, a Dutch student rowing club
- Proteus effect, where the behavior of an individual is changed by the characteristics of their avatar
- Proteus phenomenon, the tendency in science for early replications of a work to contradict the original findings
