= Proteas =

Proteas may refer to:

== Singular ==
- Proteas of Macedon (4th century BC), ancient Greek cavalry commander
- Proteas of Zeugma, ancient Syrian commentator on Homer
- Proteas Voulas B.C., a Greek basketball club
- Proteas, one of the official mascots of the 2004 Summer Olympics

== Plural ==
- plural of Protea, genus of South African flowering plant
- Protea (car), South African car
- The Proteas, nickname of several South African sports teams:
  - Proteas (rugby union)
  - South Africa national cricket team
  - South Africa national netball team
  - South Africa men's national netball team

== See also ==
- Protea (disambiguation)
