= Ford Fiesta (first generation) =

Supermini car model (1976–1983)

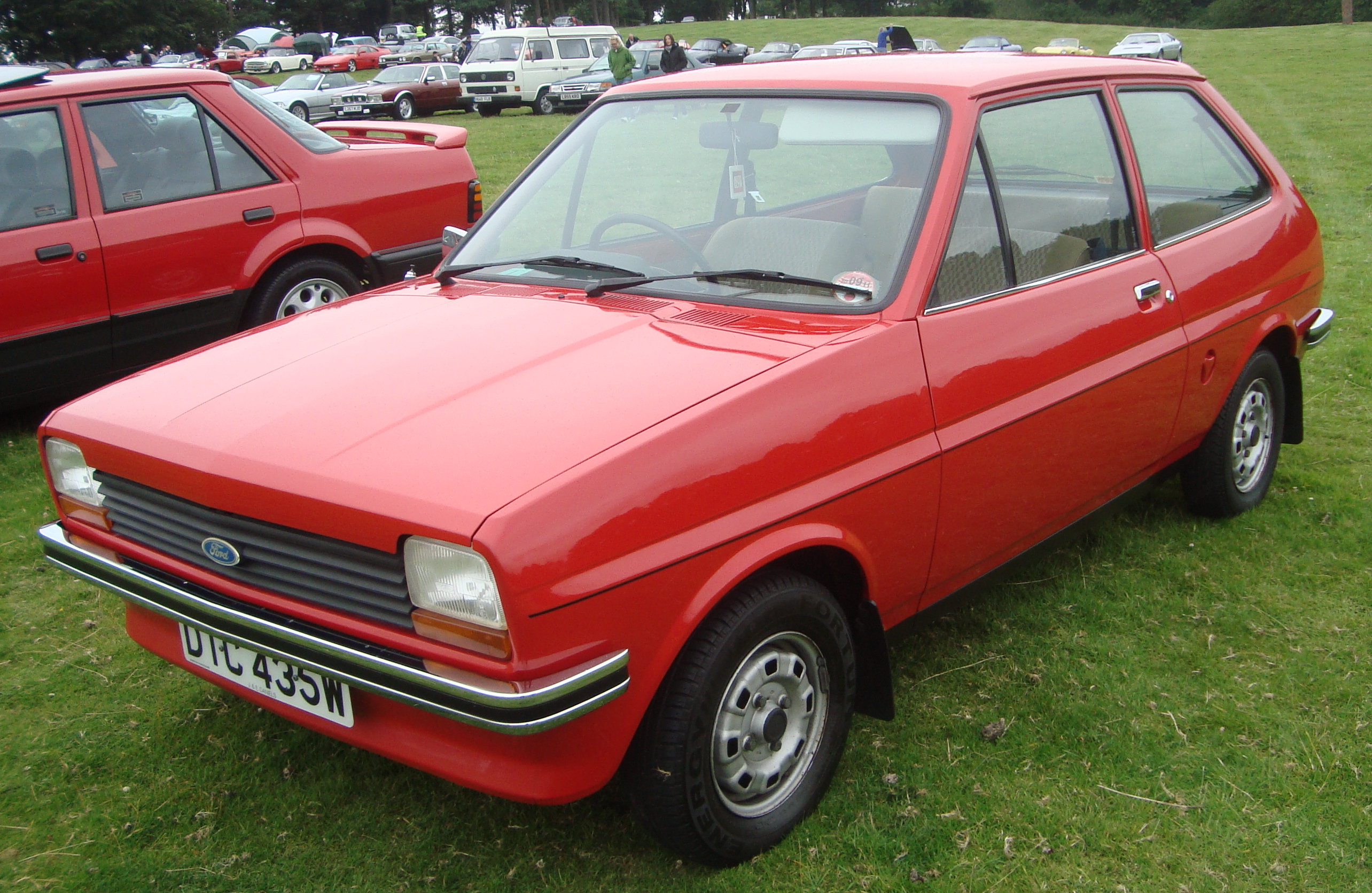

Overview
- Manufacturer: Ford Europe
- Production: June 1976 – August 1983
- Model years: 1977–1980 (North America)
- Assembly: Spain: Almussafes (Ford Valencia); United Kingdom: Dagenham (Ford Dagenham); West Germany: Cologne (CB&A); West Germany: Saarlouis (SB&A)
- Designer: Tom Tjaarda; Uwe Bahnsen

Body and chassis
- Class: Supermini (B)
- Body style: 3-door hatchback 3-door panel van
- Platform: Ford B platform

Powertrain
- Engine: 957 cc (58.4 cu in) Valencia I4; 1,117 cc (68.2 cu in) Valencia I4; 1,298 cc (79.2 cu in) Crossflow I4; 1,597 cc (97.5 cu in) Crossflow I4
- Transmission: 4-speed BC4 manual

Dimensions
- Wheelbase: 2,286 mm (90.0 in)
- Length: 3,565 mm (140.4 in)
- Width: 1,567 mm (61.7 in)
- Height: 1,360 mm (54 in)

Chronology
- Successor: Ford Fiesta (second generation); Ford Escort (North America); Ford Festiva (North America)

The Ford Fiesta Mk1 is the first generation of the Ford Fiesta supermini. It was introduced in 1976 as Ford Europe's first multi-national front-wheel-drive automobile, and was available in both 3-door hatchback and panel van derivatives. In 1983, the Fiesta was updated, and the Fiesta Mk2 was introduced.

== History ==
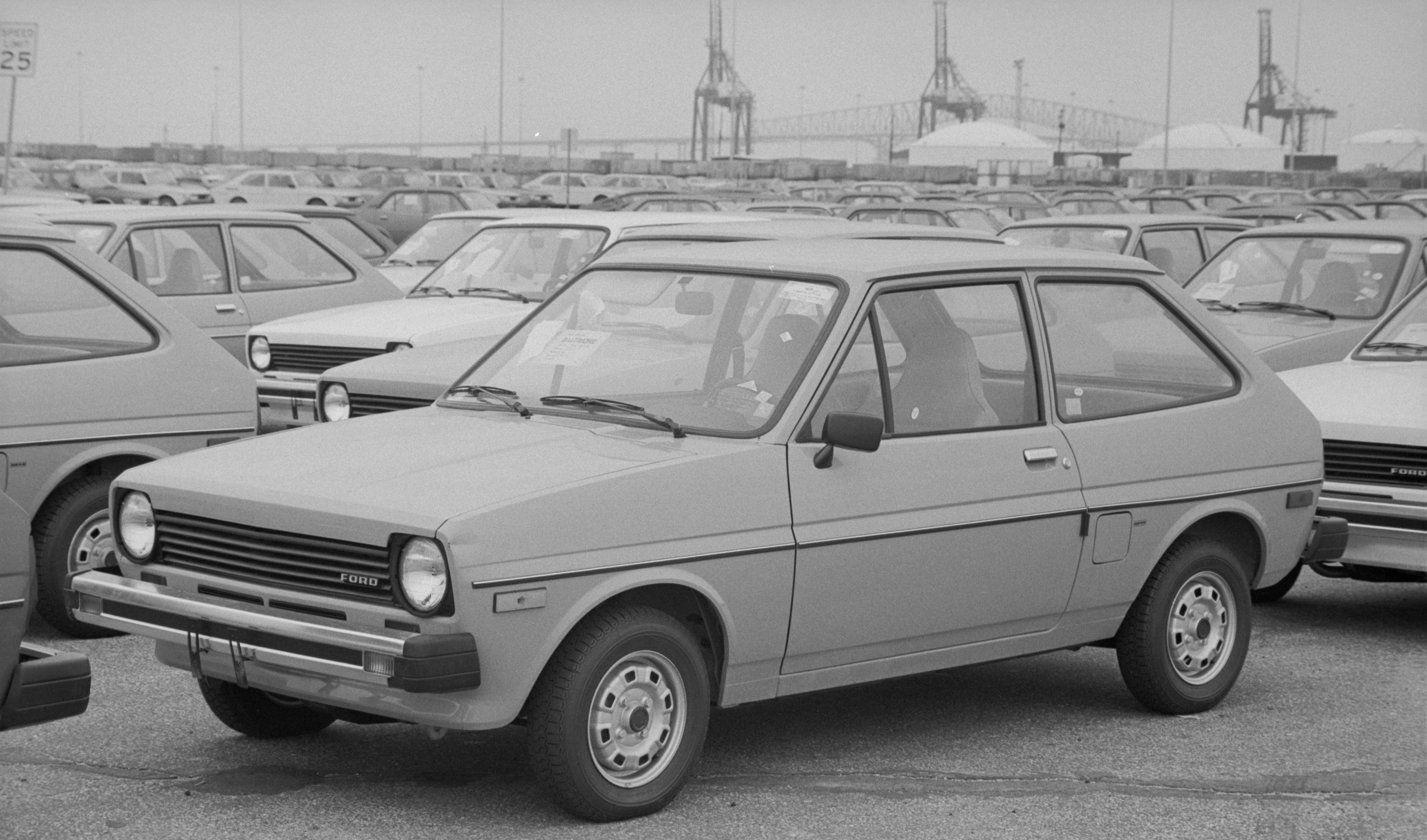
US-market Fiestas at Dundalk Marine Terminal in 1977

The Fiesta was developed under the project name "Bobcat" (not to be confused with the subsequent rebadged Mercury variant of the Ford Pinto) and approved by Henry Ford II in September 1972. Development targets indicated a production cost US$100 less than the Escort. The car was to have a wheelbase longer than the Fiat 127 (although shorter than some other rivals, like the Peugeot 104, Renault 5 and Volkswagen Polo), but with an overall length shorter than the Escort. The final proposal was developed by Tom Tjaarda at Ghia. The project was approved for production in December 1973, with Ford's engineering centres in Cologne and Dunton (Essex) collaborating.

Ford estimated that 500,000 Fiestas a year would be produced, and built in all-new factory in Almussafes, Valencia, Spain; a trans-axle factory near Bordeaux, France, and factory extensions to the assembly plants in Dagenham, UK. Final assembly took place in both Valencia and Dagenham. Ford's plants in Dagenham, England, and Saarlouis and Cologne (from 1979) in Germany, also manufactured Fiestas.

The motoring press had begun speculating about the existence of the Bobcat project since 1973, but it was not until December 1975 that Ford officially announced it as the Fiesta. A Fiesta was on display at the 24 Hours of Le Mans in June 1976, and a few rallys.

The name Fiesta belonged to General Motors when the car was designed, as they had used the name for the Oldsmobile Fiesta in the 1950s; however, it was freely given for Ford to use on their new supermini. Ford's marketing team had preferred the name Bravo, but Henry Ford II vetoed it in favour of Fiesta.

Mechanically, the Fiesta adopted the now industry-standard mechanical layout pioneered by Fiat with a transverse mounted engine coupled to an end-on four-speed manual transmission of the Ford BC-Series with unequal length driveshafts. The power unit would be a new "short block" version of the venerable Ford Kent OHV engine, dubbed "Valencia" after the new factory's location. To cut costs and speed up the research and development, the new powertrain package destined for the Fiesta was tested in Fiat 127 development mules.

Unlike several rivals, which used torsion bars in their suspension, the Fiesta used coil springs. The front suspension was of Ford's typical "track control arm" arrangement, where MacPherson struts were combined with lower control arms and longitudinal compression links. The standard rear suspension used a beam axle, trailing links and a Panhard rod, whilst an anti-roll bar was included in the sports package. All Mk1 Fiestas featured 12-inch wheels as standard, with disc brakes at the front and drum brakes at the rear. Ford paid particular attention ease of service, and published the times required to replace various common parts.

== Model history ==
Although not the first Ford vehicle to feature front-wheel drive (the 1960s Taunus 12M produced by Ford of Germany laid claim to that title), the Fiesta is widely credited as being Ford's first globally successful front-wheel-drive model, and was the first front-wheel drive Ford car to feature a transverse engine layout. Pilot production began at Cologne in April 1976, with production starting in Valencia and Dagenham in October of that year. The Fiesta was officially launched in the UK on 2 February 1977, where it was available from £1,856 for the basic 950 cc-engined model.

It was only the second hatchback supermini to have been built in the UK at this stage, being launched a year after the Vauxhall Chevette, but nearly a year before the launch of the Chrysler Sunbeam and four years before the Austin Metro. The millionth Fiesta was produced in 1979.

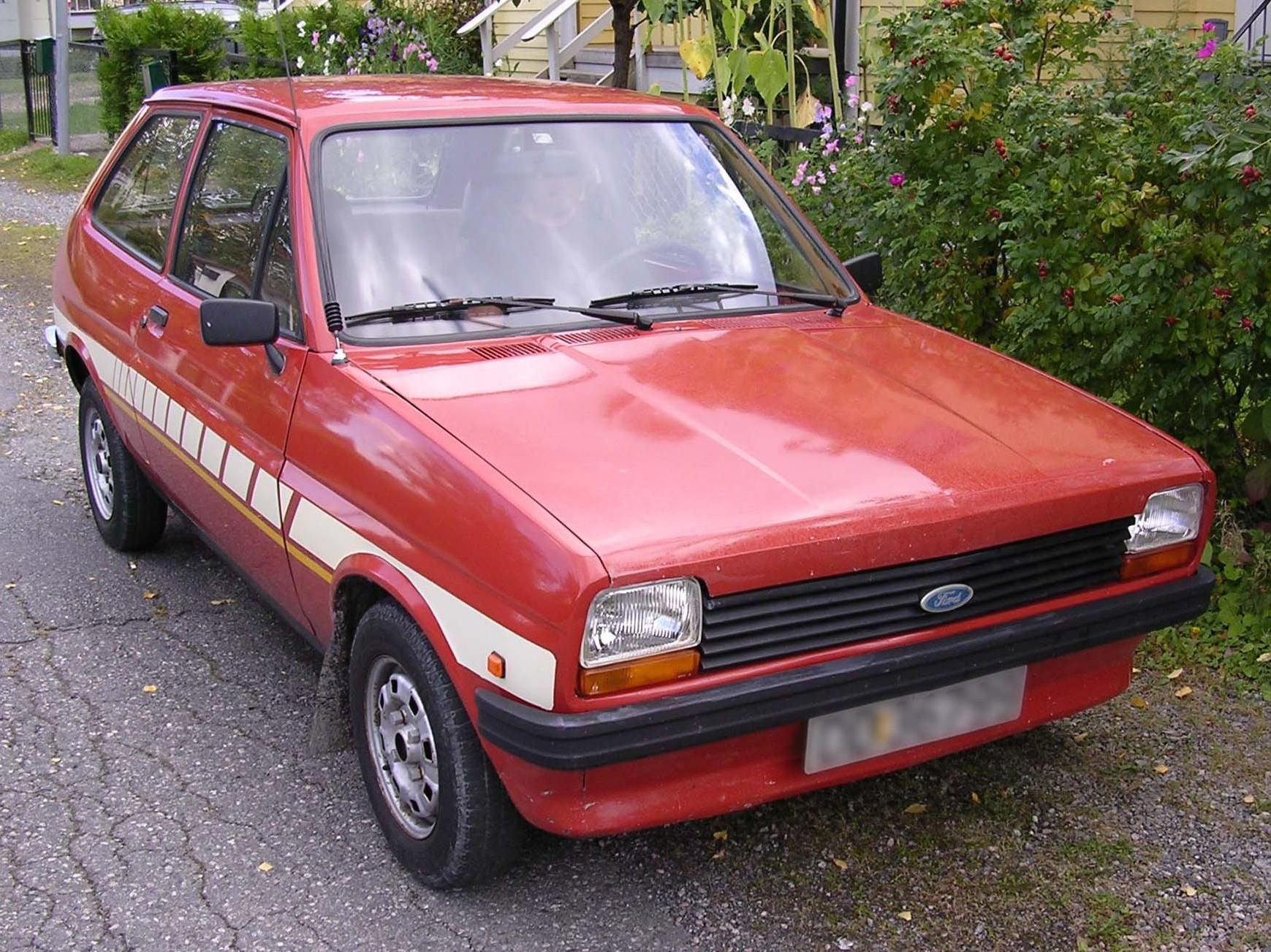
Fiesta Festival (EU) front

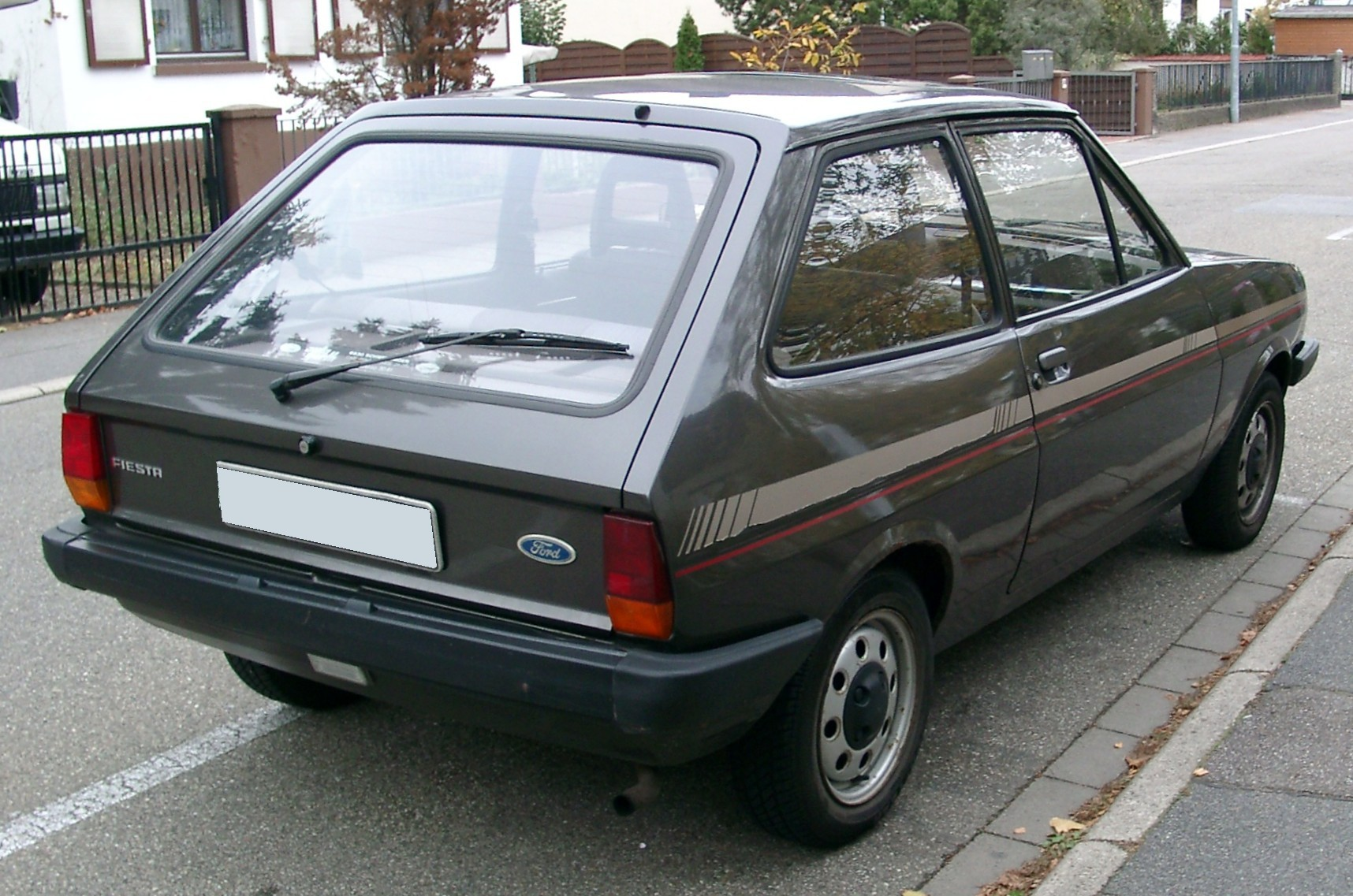
Fiesta (EU) rear

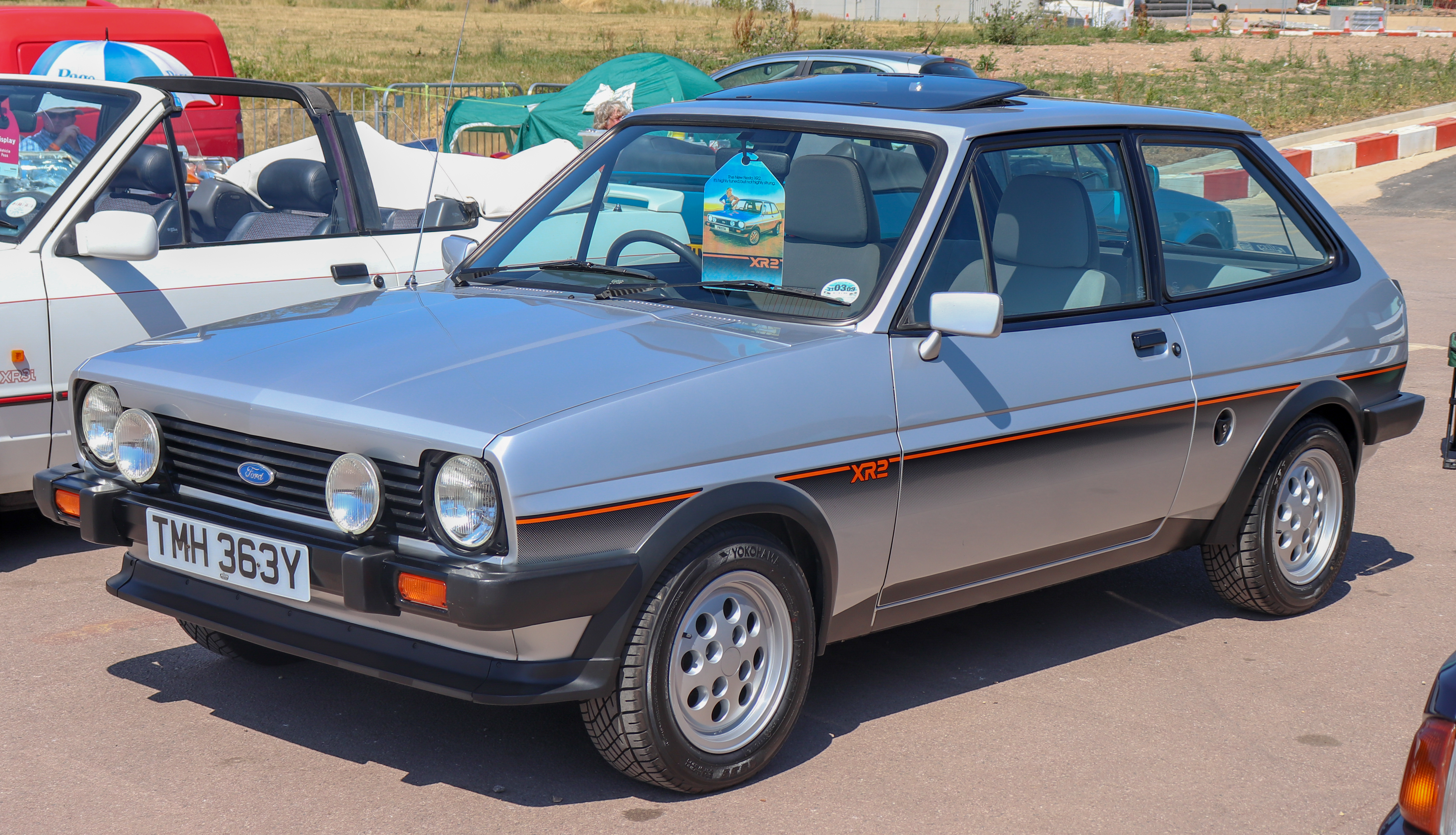
1983 Ford Fiesta XR2

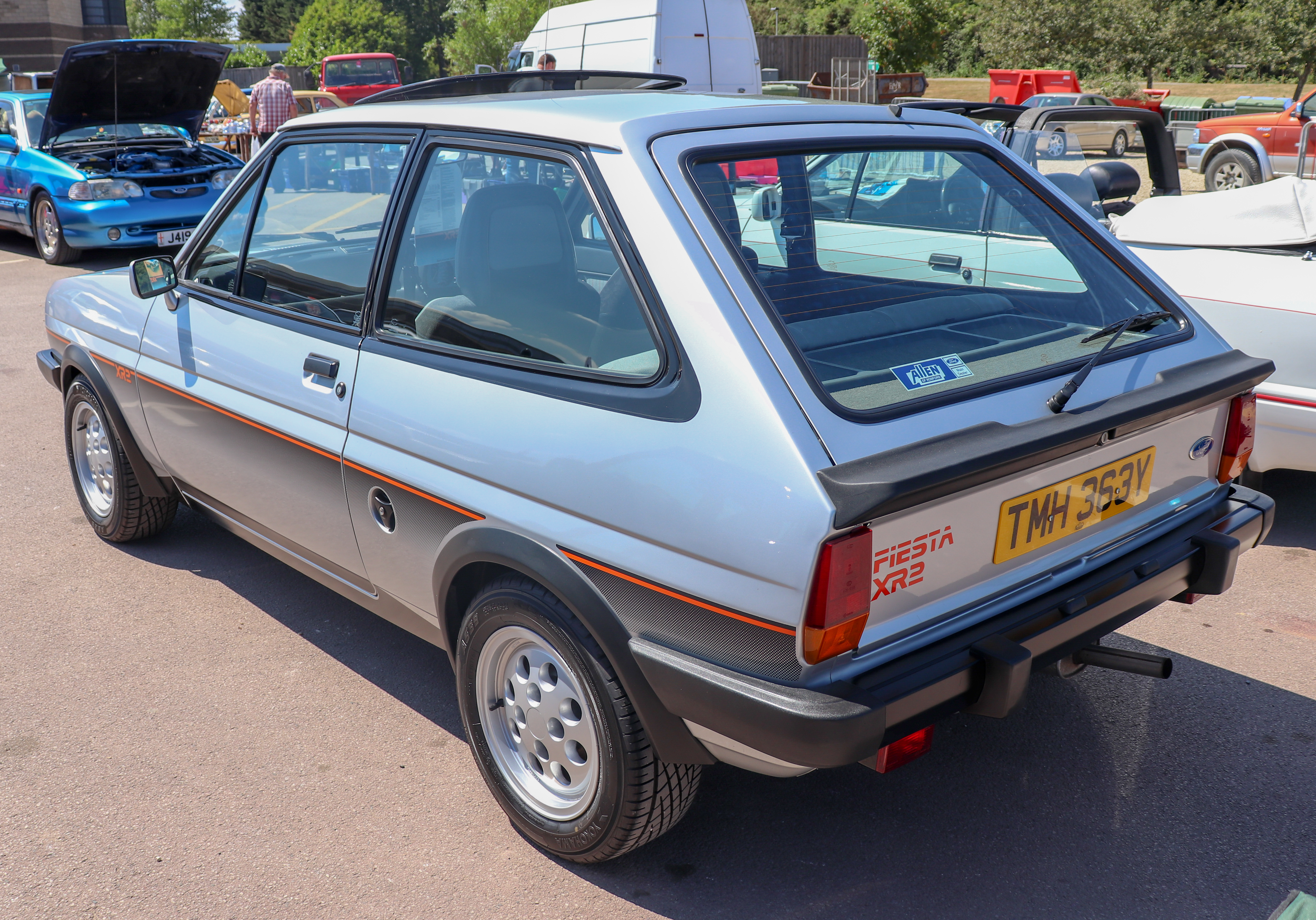
Rear view of XR2

The car was initially available in Europe with the Valencia 957 cc (58.4 cu in) inline-four (high compression and low compression options), and 1,117 cc (68.2 cu in) engines and in Base, Popular, L, GL (1978 onward), Ghia and S trim, as well as a van. The U.S. Mark I Fiesta was built in Saarlouis and Cologne, Germany but to slightly different specifications; U.S. models were Base, Decor, Sport, and Ghia, the Ghia having the highest level of trim. These trim levels changed very little in the Fiesta's three-year run in the US, from 1977 to 1980. All U.S. models featured the more powerful 1,596 cc (97.4 cu in) engine, which was the older "Crossflow" version of the Kent engine. Among the other changes required for the US market, the Fiesta was fitted with a catalytic converter and air pump to satisfy strict Californian and Federal emission regulations, energy-absorbing bumpers, side-marker lamps, round sealed-beam headlamps, improved crash dynamics and fuel system integrity as well as optional air conditioning (a/c was not available in Europe). In the U.S. market, the Ford Escort replaced both the Fiesta and the compact Pinto in 1981.

At the beginning of the British government's Motability scheme for disabled motorists in 1978, the Fiesta was one of the key cars to be available on the scheme.

A sporting derivative (1.3 L Supersport) was offered in Europe for the 1980 model year, using the 1.3 L (79 cu in) Kent Crossflow engine, effectively to test the market for the similar XR2 introduced a year later, which featured a 1.6 L version of the same engine. Black plastic trim was added to the exterior and interior. The small square headlights were replaced with larger circular ones resulting in the front indicators being moved into the bumper to accommodate the change. With a quoted performance of 0–60 mph (0–97 km/h) in 9.3 seconds and 105 mph (169 km/h) top speed, the XR2 hot hatch became a cult car beloved of boy racers throughout the 1980s.

For the 1979 auto show season, Ford in conjunction with its Ghia Operations in Turin, Italy, produced the Ford Fiesta Tuareg off-road car. It was touted in press materials as "a concept vehicle designed and equipped for practical, off-road recreational use."

Minor revisions appeared across the range in late 1981, with larger bumpers to meet crash worthiness regulations and other small improvements in a bid to maintain showroom appeal ahead of the forthcoming second generation.

It was well-received on most European markets, particularly the United Kingdom, where it was the ninth best selling car in its first year, and by 1981 it was the third best seller. However, in 1982 it was outsold by BL's new Austin Metro, and with new superminis from British Leyland, Volkswagen, Vauxhall/Opel, Nissan, Fiat and Peugeot newly launched or about to be launched, Ford set about revitalising the Fiesta in order to keep it competitive in Europe.

=== Specifications ===
| Model | Displacement | Type code | Power | Top Speed | 0–60 mph (0–97 km/h) (s) | Years |
|---|---|---|---|---|---|---|
| 950 low compression | 957 cc (58.40 cu in) | Valencia | 40 hp (41 PS; 30 kW) | 81 mph (130 km/h) | 18.6 | 1976–1983 |
| 950 normal compression | 957 cc (58.40 cu in) | Valencia | 44 hp (45 PS; 33 kW) | 85 mph (137 km/h) | 16.6 | 1976–1983 |
| 1.1 | 1,117 cc (68.16 cu in) | Valencia | 52 hp (53 PS; 39 kW) | 90 mph (145 km/h) | 15.2 | 1976–1981 |
| 1.1 | 1,117 cc (68.16 cu in) | Valencia | 54 hp (55 PS; 40 kW) | 90 mph (145 km/h) | 15.1 | 1981–1983 |
| 1.1 Economy | 1,117 cc (68.16 cu in) | Valencia | 55 hp (56 PS; 41 kW) | 90 mph (145 km/h) | 15.1 | 1982–1983 |
| 1.1 X | 1,117 cc (68.16 cu in) | Valencia | 69 hp (70 PS; 51 kW) | 99 mph (159 km/h) | 11.3 | 1980–1981 |
| 1.3 | 1,298 cc (79.21 cu in) | Crossflow | 65 hp (66 PS; 48 kW) | 98 mph (158 km/h) | 11.6 | 1977–1983 |
| 1.3 RS | 1,298 cc (79.21 cu in) | Crossflow | 74 hp (75 PS; 55 kW) | 103 mph (166 km/h) | 11.2 | 1979–1981 |
| 1.6 RS | 1,599 cc (97.58 cu in) | Crossflow | 90 hp (91 PS; 67 kW) | 103 mph (166 km/h) | 9.6 | 1980 |
| 1.6 XR2 | 1,599 cc (97.58 cu in) | Crossflow | 83 hp (84 PS; 62 kW) | 106 mph (171 km/h) | 9.5 | 1981–1983 |

== US market ==
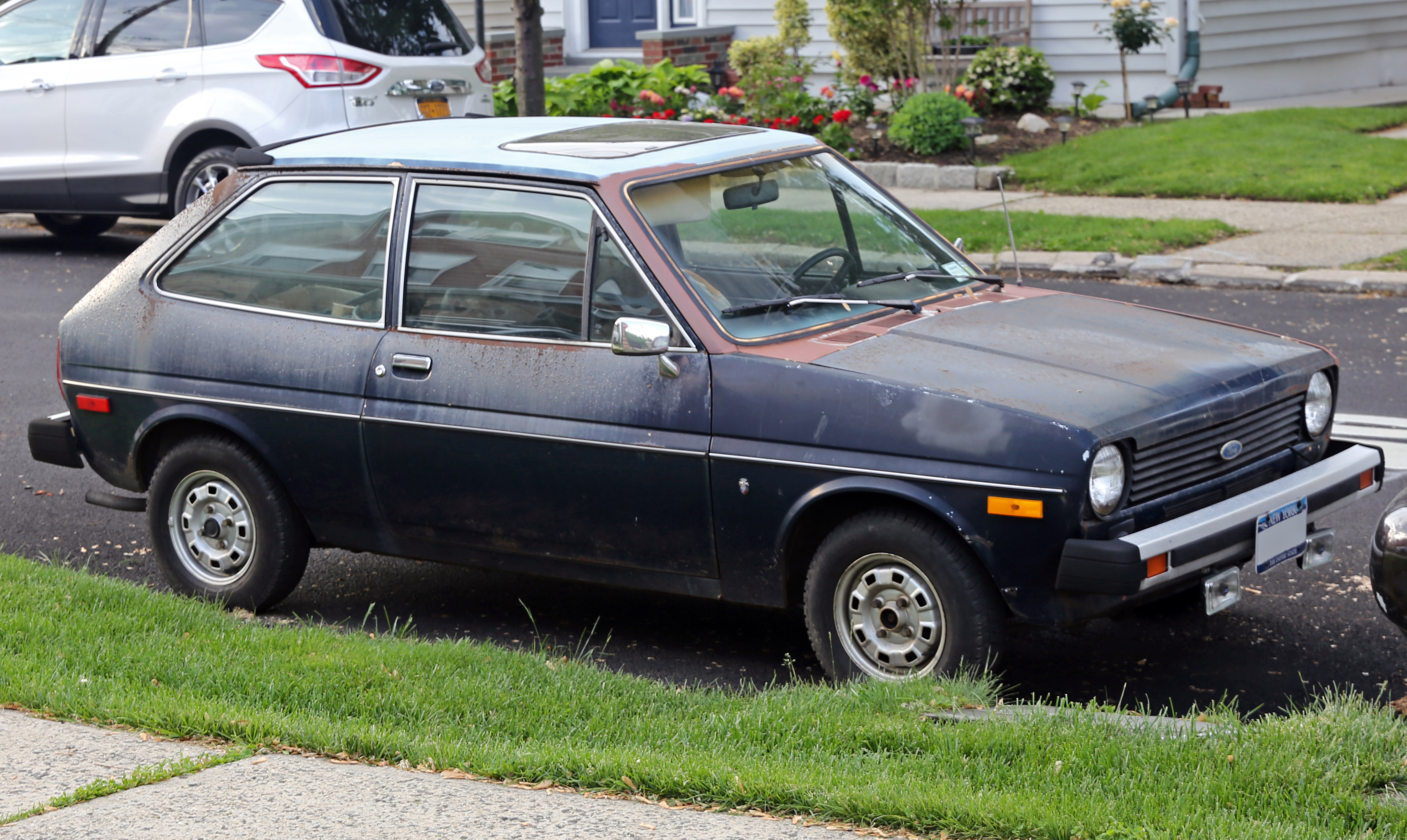
US market Ford Fiesta Ghia (1979)

The US Mark I Fiesta was built at Cologne Body & Assembly, but to slightly different specifications; US models were Base, Decor, Sport, and Ghia, with the Ghia having the highest level of trim. These trim levels changed very little in the Fiesta's three-year run in the US, from 1978 to 1980. All US models featured the more powerful 1,596 cc (97.4 cu in) engine, which was the older "Crossflow" version of the Kent rather than the Valencia, fitted with a catalytic converter and air pump to satisfy strict emission regulations, energy-absorbing bumpers, side-marker lamps, round sealed-beam headlamps, and improved crash dynamics and fuel system integrity, as well as optional air conditioning (which was not available in Europe). To counteract the impact of the additional torque and power of the larger engine, the longer (left) halfshaft was split into two with an idle gear shaft and an universal joint.

In the US market, the North American Ford Escort replaced both the Fiesta and the compact Pinto in 1981.

== Convertible conversions ==
=== Crayford ===
In 1981, coachbuilders Crayford developed a convertible version of the Fiesta, which was dubbed the Fiesta Fly. Designed by David McMullan, the Fiesta Fly had a permanently welded-shut boot, with a plastic sill fitted to prevent the car from needing to be repainted. The production history of the Fiesta Fly is not clear; but the common claim that only 20 or so cars were built is probably untrue; it is believed that this figure refers to the number built by Crayford, rather than the number built in total. What is known is that Dorset-based firm F. English Coachwork Division bought the rights to produce the Fiesta Fly sometime in 1982, and Autocar reported in September 1983 that about 100 Fiesta Fly conversions had been produced. It is believed that F. English built around 200 Fiesta Flys, with 83 known to survive. Crayford also reportedly built two Fiesta Flys based on the Mk2 Fiesta. It was also possible to purchase any production Fiesta model in Fiesta Fly form, not just the 1300 and XR2 models as often reported.
