= Ford Classic =

Ford Classic may refer to:

- Ford Consul Classic, a mid-sized car built by Ford of Britain between 1961 and 1963.
- Ford Fiesta Classic, a supermini built by Ford from 1995 until 1997.
- Ford Classic, a supermini built by Ford India since 2012 (also known as the Fiesta Classic from 2011 to 2012.)
