= Glass Sport Motors =

South African motor manufacturer

GSM
- Type: Former
- Founded: 1958
- Defunct: 1966
- Headquarters: Cape Town, South Africa
- Key people: Bob van Niekerk (co-founder); Willie Meissner (co-founder); Verster de Wit (designer)

Glassport Motor Company (GSM) was a South African motor manufacturer based in Cape Town, active between 1958 and 1966. They produced the Dart and Flamingo sports cars. The name Glass Sport Motors is due to their use of fiberglass. GSM narrowly missed being South Africa's first sports car maker, beaten by the GRP Protea. A Dart, a Flamingo, as well as a Protea can be viewed at the Franschhoek Motor Museum in South Africa. The company built 266 cars in South Africa, along with an additional 76 Darts ("Deltas") built in England.

== History ==
The company was founded by Bob van Niekerk and Willie Meissner in 1958 after Meissner went to England and stumbled upon fiberglass, a new technology at the time. He wrote a letter to van Niekerk asking him to come to England and further study fiberglass crafting. They came into contact with South African designer Verster de Wit (who was working on the Sunbeam Alpine) who helped them style their first car design and taught them the design process. The pair finally decided on an attractive design and built a clay model. A mould was created and one body was made and sold in England to fund Bob's trip back to South Africa. On returning to South Africa, they built the first prototypes of the GSM Dart. GSM's were mainly sold in South Africa and England although several seem to have made it to Canada.

== The Dart ==
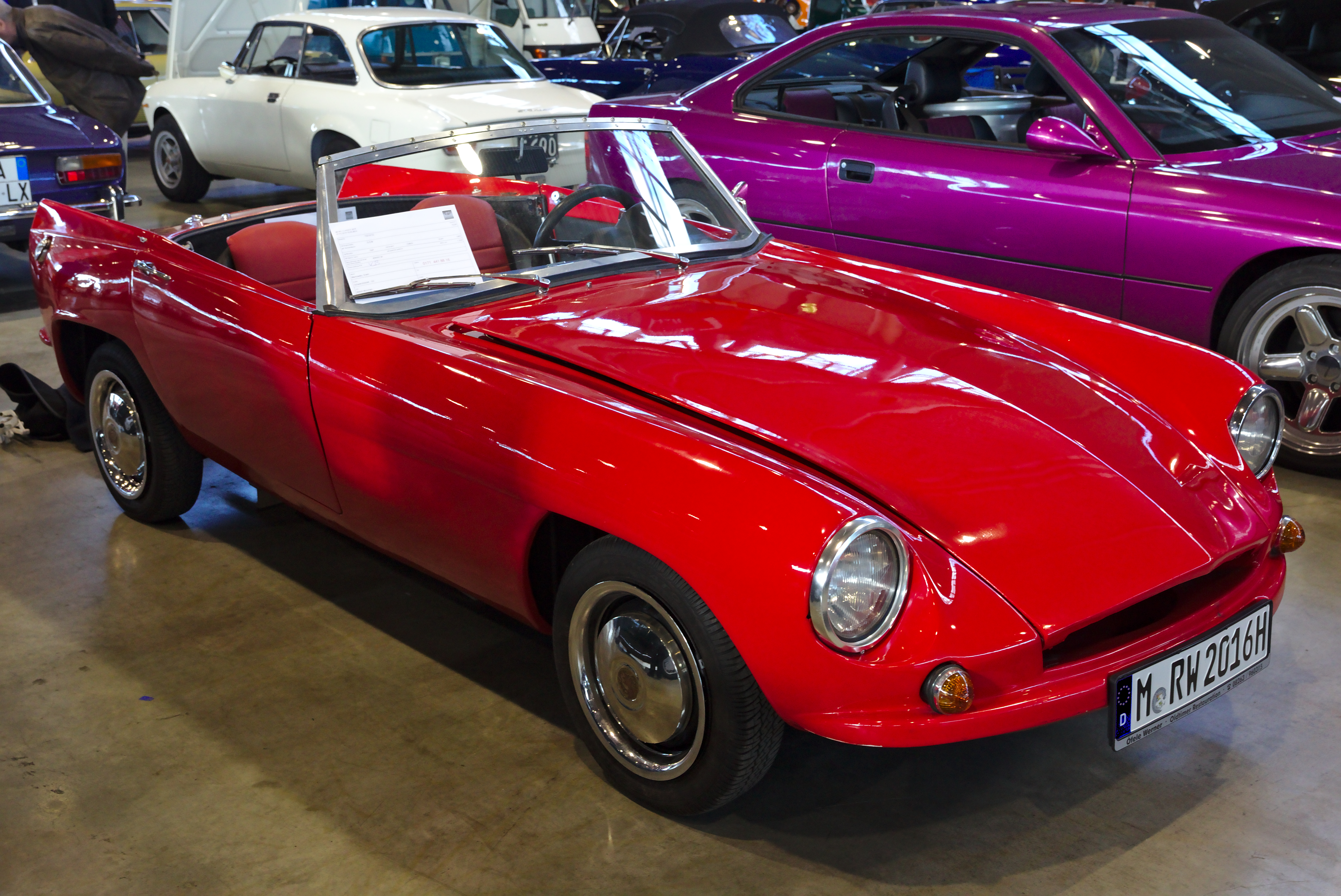
GSM Dart at Retro Classics 2019 in Stuttgart

The Dart was GSM's first production model. The car used a variety of engines including Coventry Climax Ford Anglia 100E and 105E as well as four examples which were fitted with Alfa Romeo 1300 cc units nestled into a ladder type chassis with transverse springs at the front and coil springs at the rear. The cars had a glass fibre, open two-seat body fitted. A hardtop was later made available, with a reverse slanted rear window which later Fords also exhibited.

Yet other versions were fitted with Alfa Romeo Sprint Veloce (SV) engines. Ernest Pieterse was the first to try this – when looking to prepare a machine for the 1959 South African Nine Hour Endurance Race (South Africa's classic sports-car race), and having to beat such machines as Porsche Carreras, Ernest bought a Dart and fitted disc brakes, Alfa SV engine, etc. The car led for a while but retired with boiling brake fluid. This let John Love's Carrera into the lead but it too retired, or was delayed, and another Dart with an 1100 cc Climax engine stepped into the breach and was leading after nine hours. Since then Porsche Spyders and Lotus Fifteens have been used in the Nine Hours, rather squashing anyone with aspirations of further wins in a GSM Dart.

The Dart was also manufactured at West Malling, Kent, England by GSM Cars between 1961 and 1962. British-built examples are known as the GSM Delta - Daimler had also planned to call their SP250 Roadster 'Dart', but had to desist as this was a registered trademark of Chrysler's and GSM followed suit. 76 examples were built in the UK; together with about an equali number imported, around 150 GSMs ended up in the UK.

== The Flamingo ==
GSM Flamingo advert

The Flamingo coupé was produced by GSM from 1962. The original intention was to use a forthcoming Ford V6 but it did not appear in time and so it was initially powered by a 1.7-litre Ford Taunus engine and later by the 1.5-litre Ford Cortina (non-crossflow) engine. Although similar in appearance, the Flamingo is a very different car. The front suspension replaced the transverse leaf springs of the Dart with two wishbones compressing Mini rubber cones, and later small coil springs. The rear was cleverly designed to stop one wheel spinning faster than the other under power through the use of different trailing arm setups on each side.

Owners include Gordon Murray, who owned a 1964 example with a breathed on 1600 cc Crossflow engine.

== Replicas ==
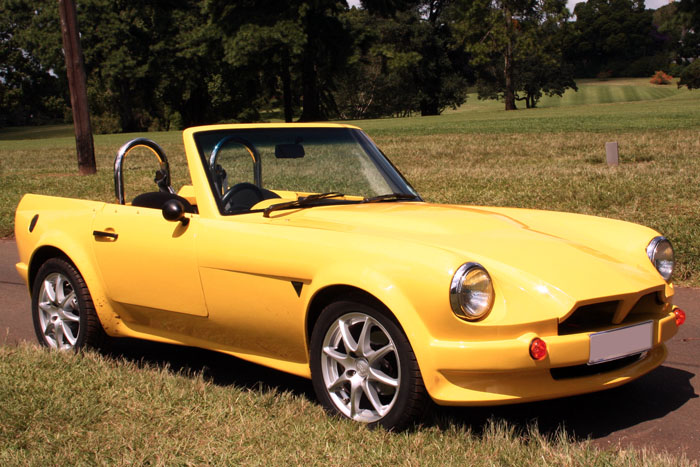
Hayden Dart

In the 1980s a series of accurate replicas known as Levy Darts were built by Jeff Levy with involvement from one of the original trio, the late Verster de Wit. In the 1990s a visually similar mechanically different replica in the form of the Hayden Dart II was manufactured; these are still being made and have evolved to include independent rear suspension. Engine options are wide as with the original GSMs: the Kent 1600 and Toyota 4A-GE are the most common options, but there are examples with Mazda Rotary Turbo, Toyota 4A-GZE, and various other engines.
