= Protei =

Protei may refer to:

- Protei-5 Russian diver propulsion vehicle
- Latin genitive or plural of Proteus
