= Protea (disambiguation) =

Protea is a genus of flowers in the family Proteaceae.

Protea may also refer to:

- 9313 Protea, an asteroid, presumably named after the flower genus
- Protea Book House, a Pretoria publisher
- Protea (car), a motorcar build in South Africa during 1957 and 1958
- Protea Hotels by Marriott, a hotel brand
- Protea (telephone), a South African telephone plug design
- Protéa, the eponymous character played by Josette Andriot in a series of French silent espionage films made between 1913 and 1919

== Ships ==
- HMSAS Protea (1922), the first survey vessel commissioned in the South African Navy from 1922 to 1933
- HMSAS Protea (1947), a survey vessel commissioned in the South African Navy from 1947 to 1957
- SAS Protea (A324), a survey vessel of the South African Navy commissioned in 1972 and still in service

== See also ==
- Proteas (disambiguation)
- Protease, a class of enzyme
- Proteus (disambiguation)
