= A. proteus =

A. proteus may refer to:

- Acmaeops proteus, a long-horned beetle species found in Canada, Mexico and the United States
- Amoeba proteus, a protozoan species

== See also ==
- Proteus (disambiguation)
