= Ford Kent engine =

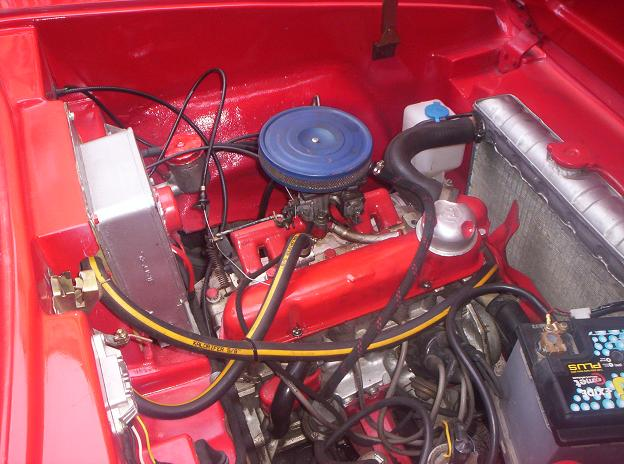
- 1.3 L (1,297 cc) engine in an Anadol A1

Overview
- Manufacturer: Ford of Britain
- Also called: Ford pre-crossflow Ford Crossflow; Ford Valencia; Ford HCS; Endura-E; VSG-411/413
- Production: 1959–present

Layout
- Configuration: Naturally aspirated I4
- Displacement: 1.0 L (997 cc); 1.1 L (1,117 cc); 1.2 L (1,198 cc); 1.3 L (1,297 cc); 1.3 L (1,339 cc); 1.5 L (1,498 cc); 1.6 L (1,599 cc)
- Cylinder bore: 80.96 mm (3.19 in)
- Piston stroke: 48.41 mm (1.91 in); 58.2 mm (2.29 in); 63 mm (2.48 in); 65 mm (2.56 in); 72.75 mm (2.86 in); 77.60 mm (3.06 in)
- Cylinder block material: Cast Iron
- Cylinder head material: Cast Iron
- Valvetrain: OHV 2 valves per cyl.

Combustion
- Fuel system: Carburetor; Single-point fuel injection Multi-port fuel injection
- Fuel type: Gasoline
- Oil system: Wet sump
- Cooling system: Water-cooled

Output
- Power output: 39–111 hp (40–113 PS; 29–83 kW)

Chronology
- Predecessor: Ford Sidevalve engine
- Successor: Ford Zetec engine

The Ford Kent is an internal combustion engine from Ford of Europe. Originally developed in 1959 for the Ford Anglia, it is an in-line four-cylinder overhead valve (OHV) pushrod engine with a cast-iron cylinder head and block.

The Kent family can be divided into three basic sub-families; the original pre-Crossflow Kent, the Crossflow (the most prolific of all versions of the Kent), and the transverse mounted Valencia.

The arrival of the Duratec-E engine in the fifth generation Fiesta range in 2002 signalled the end of the engine's use in production vehicles after a 44-year career, although the Valencia derivative remained in limited production in Brazil, as an industrial use engine by Ford's Power Products division, where it is known as the VSG-411 and VSG-413. Since 2010, it has been actively produced in the United States factories for Formula Ford globally because of its popularity in motorsport.

== The name ==
Within Ford, it is said that the Kent name originally referred to the A711 and A711M blocks (commonly called the 711M block) with square main bearing caps for the Crossflow series, which represented a vast improvement in the durability of the engines. The name subsequently began to be used outside the company to refer to pre-711M engines as well.

== Pre-Crossflow ==
The original OHV three-main-bearing Kent engine first appeared in the 1959 Anglia with a capacity of 1.0 L (997 cc). The Anglia was the only car to be fitted with the 1-litre Kent engine. It developed 39 bhp (29 kW) at 5,000 rpm — unusually high for the time. With an 80.96 mm × 48.41 mm (3.19 in × 1.91 in) bore and stroke, combined with independent (non-siamesed) four intake and four exhaust ports, it was a departure from traditional undersquare English engine design. The short stroke was chosen to keep piston speeds low and to help create a durable engine.

The same engine, with its bore unchanged, but with longer 65 and 72.75 mm (2.56 and 2.86 in) stroke and thus larger capacities were subsequently used in the Ford Consul Classic (1.3 L (1,339 cc)) and Consul Capri (1.3 and 1.5 L (1,339 and 1,498 cc) - the latter with five main bearings), the Mk1 and early Mk2 Cortinas (58.2 mm (2.29 in) stroke 1.2 L (1,198 cc) 63 mm (2.48 in) stroke, five-main bearing 1.3 and 1.5 L (1,297 and 1,498 cc)), and the early Corsairs.

In addition to its 'over-square' cylinder dimensions, a further unusual feature of the Kent engine at its introduction was an externally mounted combined oil filter/pump unit designed to facilitate low-cost production and easy maintenance.

The engine is now referred to as the pre-crossflow Kent, in reverse-flow cylinder head configuration with both the inlet and exhaust being on the same side of the head.

Applications:

- Ford Anglia
- Ford Cortina
- Ford Consul Classic and Consul Capri.
- Ford Corsair
- 107E Ford Prefect
- Autocars Sussita
- Lotus Seven S2
- Marcos 1500 GT
- Otosan Anadol 1.2 L – 1.3 L (1966–1984)
- TVR Grantura

== Crossflow ==
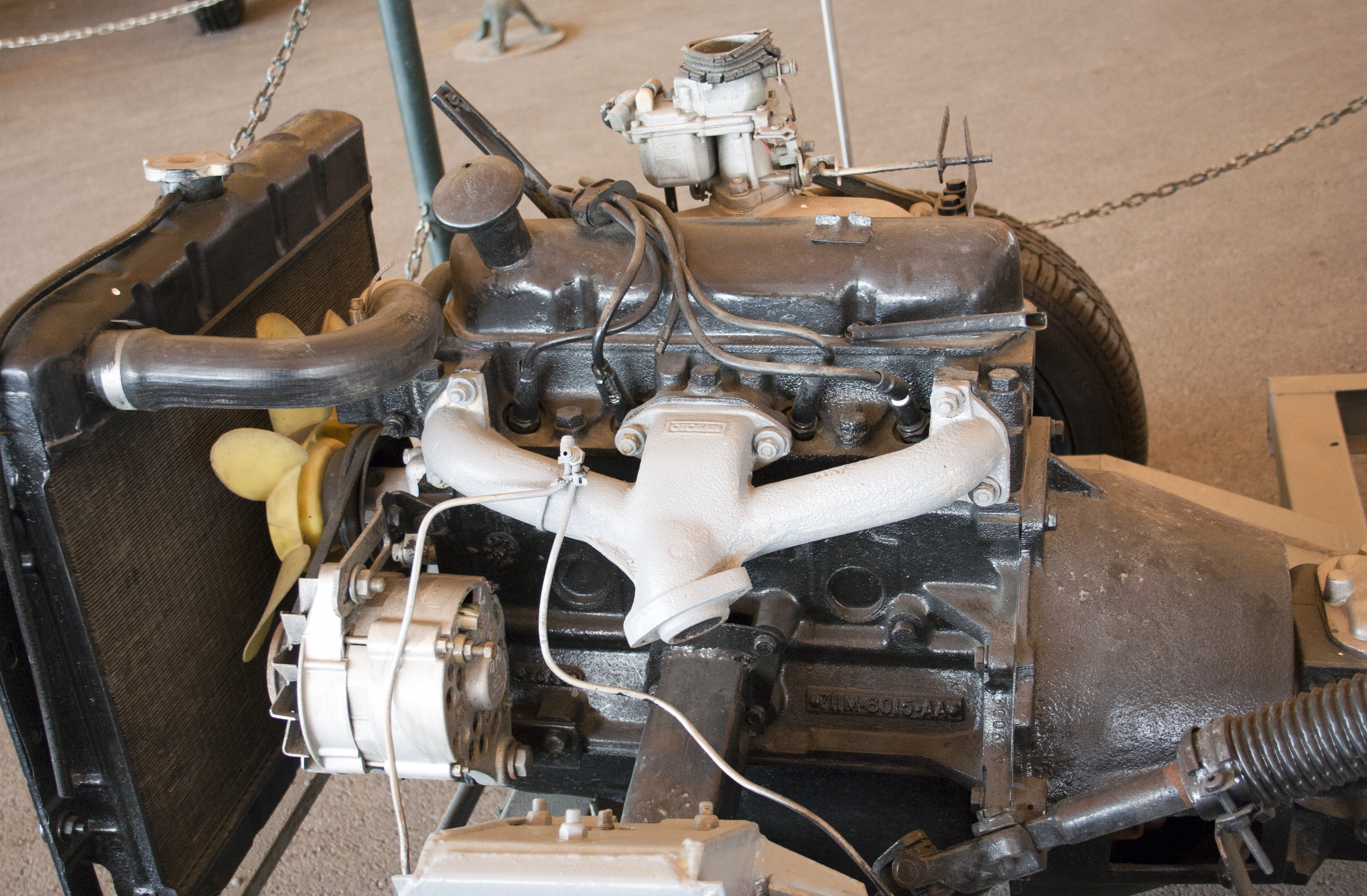
A 1.3 litre Kent Crossflow (711M block) in an Anadol FW11 prototype

A 1967 redesign gave it a cross-flow type cylinder head, hence the Kent's alternative name Ford Crossflow. It went on to power the smaller-engined versions of the Ford Cortina and Ford Capri, the first and second editions of the European Escort as well as the North American Ford Pinto (1971, 1972 and 1973 only). In South Africa it also powered the 1.6 L Mk II, Mk III, Mk IV, & Mk V Ford Cortina and 1.6 L Ford Sierra.

The Crossflow featured a change in combustion chamber design, using a Heron type combustion chamber in the top of the piston rather than in the head. The head itself was flat with each engine capacity (1.1 and 1.3 L (1,098 and 1,298 cc)) featuring different pistons with different sized bowls in 681F and 711M blocks. The 1.6 L (1,599 cc) 691M block had the stronger 'square' bearing caps later used in the 711M, and small combustion chambers in the near-flat head (the bulk of the volume being in the piston bowl). In 1970, the new A711 block for 1.3 L (1,298 cc) and A711M block for 1.6 L (1,599 cc) were introduced with thicker block wall, square main bearing caps, large diameter cam followers and wider cam lobes, with the latter block having a 7/16" taller deck height, together with a return to the flat head. These changes represented a significant improvement in the reliability of the engines, and the blocks are commonly referred to as '711M' blocks.

The Ford Crossflow engine (1.3 and 1.6 L (1,298 and 1,599 cc)) also powered the Reliant Anadol (1968–1984). Other makes such as Morgan used the Crossflow on Morgan 4/4, Caterham on Caterham 7, and TVR used the engine in the Grantura, Vixen, and 1600M. It has been fitted in countless other applications as well, being a favourite of kit-car builders not only in Great Britain.

Destined for the American market, beginning with the 1977 model year, the Valencia plant began manufacturing a 1.6L, 63 bhp (47 kW), five-main bearing version that included a low emission bowl-in-pistons combustion chamber design based on the Crossflow head, and was equipped with a Dura-Spark electronic ignition. This version was used in the short-lived (1977–1980) USA-market Mk1 Fiesta. Fitting the Crossflow into the Mk1 Fiesta posed a challenge for engineers, since the car had been designed around the shorter Valencia version (below), therefore the engine had to be mounted lower down in the chassis with shorter driveshafts in order to allow the transaxle to be removed from the car for clutch replacement. This engine was later used in the XR2 version of the Mk.1 Fiesta, using the US 1600 bottom end and GT spec head and cam but without the catalytic converter or emission control equipment. 1.3L versions of the Mk I Fiesta also used the Crossflow, as opposed to the Valencia.

The Crossflow was superseded in Ford of Europe vehicles in stages - the larger capacity 1.6L was supplanted by the overhead camshaft Pinto (Lynx) unit in the Ford Cortina and Ford Capri by the late 1970s, and all versions ceased to be used in the Escort when it was replaced by the CVH engine as the Escort moved to its third generation in 1980. The final "official" use of the Crossflow was in the aforementioned 1.3L and XR2 versions of the Fiesta I which ceased production in 1983, when these were again replaced by the CVH, leaving only the Valencia variants (below) in the Fiesta I/II and entry versions of the Escort III.

== Valencia ==
A redesigned version of the Kent engine was conceived to suit transverse installation in 1976, primarily for the Mk1 Ford Fiesta, although entry level versions of the Escort Mk3 also used the engine. This derivative went through two major revisions in 1988 and 1995, detailed below, and was a mainstay of Ford's entry level compact range for nearly 25 years.

=== Original Valencia (1976–1988) ===
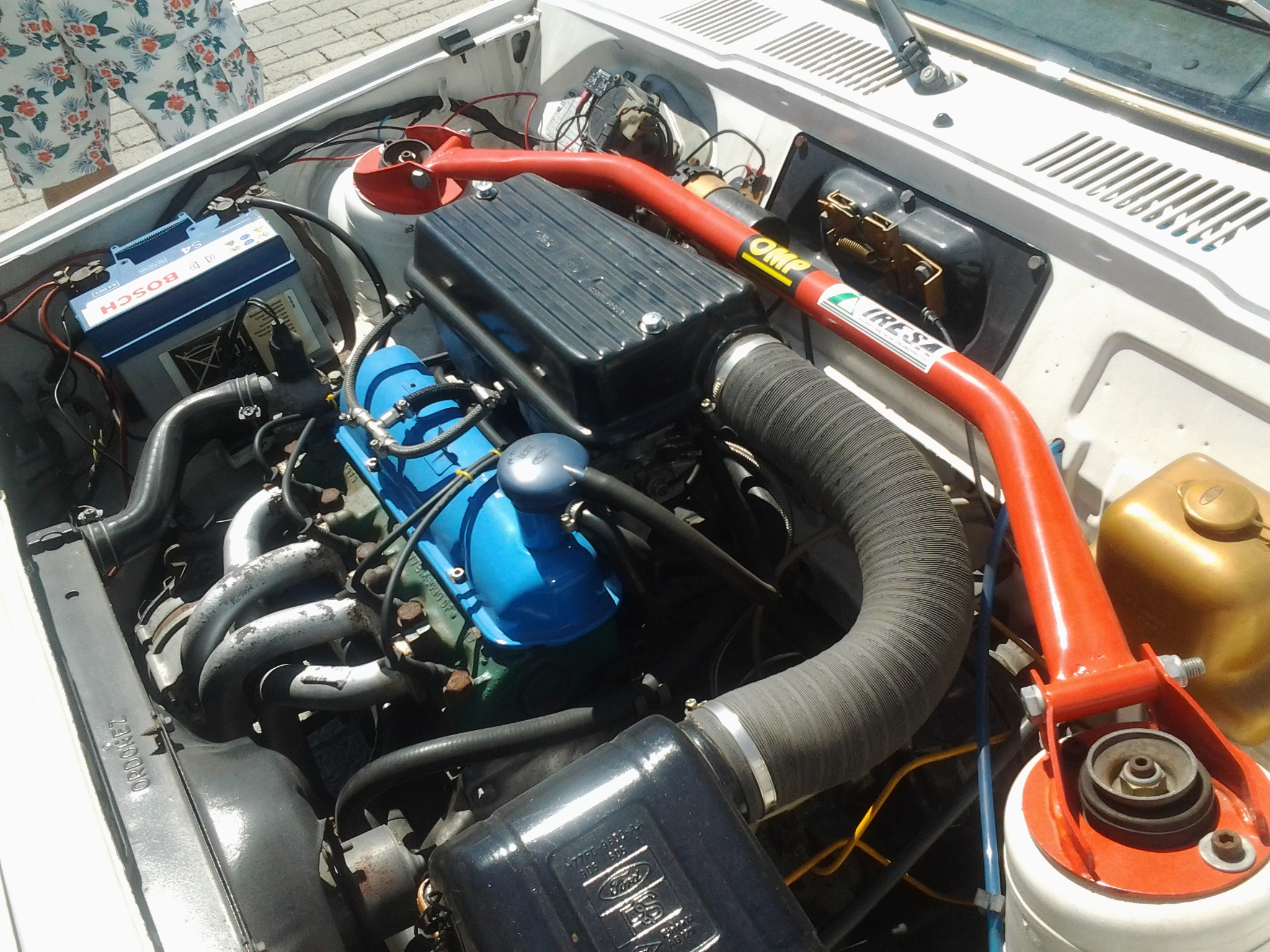
Valencia 1100 engine with RS Twin Weber DCNF conversion in a Mk1 Fiesta

The Valencia was initially available in 1.0 L (957 cc) (in both high compression and low compression versions ) and a high compression 1.1 L (1,117 cc) version.

To adapt the Kent Crossflow for front wheel drive the ancillaries were repositioned, and the cylinder block shortened by 30 mm (1.2 in). This allowed the engine to fit transversely across the Fiesta engine bay, while still allowing the transmission unit to be comfortably removed for clutch replacement. However, this difference means that very few parts of the Valencia engine are interchangeable with a Crossflow. (Ford ended up installing the Crossflow engine into the Fiesta anyway, when the market demanded a 1.3L capacity, and later a 1.6L version for the North American market models – ultimately the 1.6L Crossflow also was used in the Mk1 Fiesta XR2 when the North American market Fiesta ceased production in 1980). The bore diameter was reduced to 74mm (from 81mm on the full-size Kent), and was standard across both the 957 and 1117 versions; the extra capacity was achieved by varying the stroke.

In addition to these changes, the Valencia featured a new transmission flange to suit the BC4/5 transaxle and the cylinder head was redesigned using flat-top pistons and the traditional combustion chamber in the head. Another key difference from the 711M Crossflow block is the absence of mounting spigots cast into the faces; therefore the Valencia (and the later HCS and Endura-E versions) cannot be mounted in a longitudinal application: when installed in a Fiesta/Escort III/Orion the engine relies on the transaxle mountings for lateral location in the vehicle.

Because of these differences, Ford officially regarded the Valencia as a completely new engine despite being derived from the Kent/Crossflow family and initially dubbed it as the "L-Series" or "Valencia-L" engine ("VL" is cast into the cylinder head and block), however it became better known as the Valencia to the wider world, after the Valencia plant where it was manufactured, but eventually the name was officially adopted by Ford as well – although in sales literature it was always called simply OHV. Although the engines were assembled at Amulssafes, the blocks and heads were in fact cast in Dagenham alongside the full-size Crossflow and shipped to Spain for assembly.

A five bearing 1.3 L (1,297 cc) version of the Valencia became available in 1986 for the facelift "Erika-86" version of the Escort and Orion, replacing the similarly sized CVH unit, which increased to 1.4 L (1,392 cc) for higher specification models. The cylinder heads and pistons were modified in 1986 for unleaded fuel and the cams changed to meet the new European emissions standards along with the addition of electronic ignition.

=== HCS (1988–1996) ===
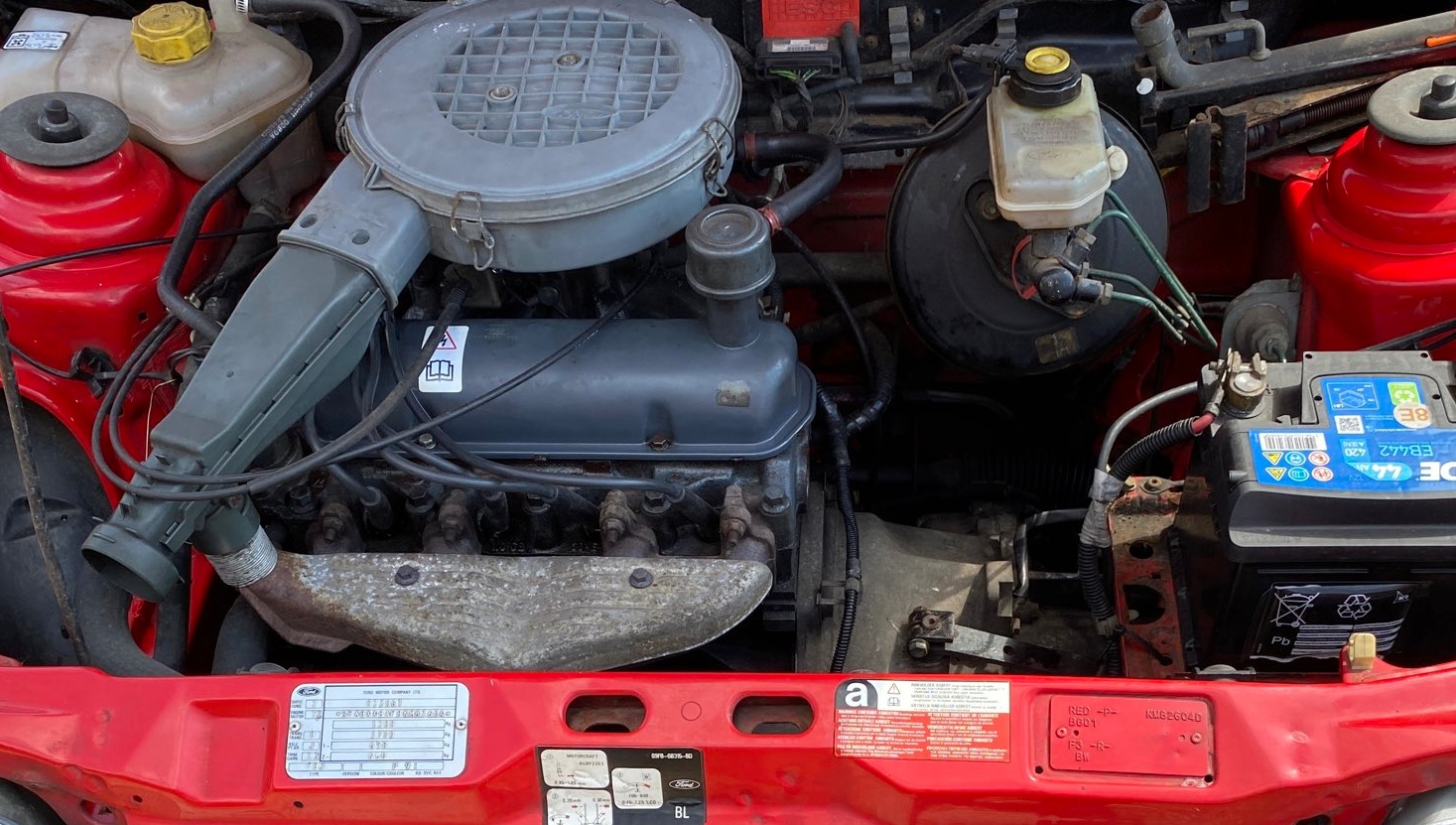
Valencia-HCS engine installed in a 1989 Ford Fiesta Mk3

In 1988 the second generation of the Valencia unit was launched to meet with tightening European emissions legislation. The substantial redesign of the engine included an all-new cylinder head with reshaped combustion chambers and inlet ports for 'lean-burn' operation, hardened valve seats and valves for operation on unleaded fuel, and the Ford EDIS fully electronic ignition system, with the option of single-point fuel injection for use with a catalytic converter - Weber carburettors were specified to replace the unreliable Ford Variable Venturi (VV) unit. The engine was renamed the Ford HCS (standing for High Compression Swirl), although some internal Ford service publications call it the Valencia-HCS in reference to its heritage. This engine used a much leaner fuel-to-air mix than a typical engine, at a 1:19 ratio. In addition to lowered emissions, Ford claimed that fuel economy increased by 11 to 18 percent while power was up from 5 to 8 percent, depending on the model.

It first appeared in 1.1 and 1.3 L (1,118 and 1,297 cc) guises on the Ford Escort and Orion for the 1989 model year, and on the then-new Ford Fiesta Mark III the same year, which also offered a smaller 1.0 L (999 cc) version to replace the older 1.0 L (957 cc) Valencia.

The HCS engine is easily distinguishable from the original Valencia by the rocker cover, head and block being painted grey instead of black, the presence of a crankshaft position sensor adjacent to the starter motor, and the absence of a distributor drive on the rear face of the cylinder block. The mechanical fuel pump also has a return line to tank, whereas the original Valencia did not. The HCS also has a "mirrored" spark plug arrangement where the plug leads appear to be splayed outwards: on the original Valencia they are all at the same angle.

=== Endura-E (1995–2002) ===
The final redesign came in 1995 with the launch of the fourth-generation Ford Fiesta. This edition was effectively another redesign of the Valencia/HCS derivative, known as the Endura-E, and featured many revisions to combat noise and harshness, including a thickened cylinder block and a cast aluminium sump. The RH engine mount position was changed to the top of the cylinder block. Multipoint fuel injection was now standard. This engine was used in the Ka until 2002 where it was replaced by the Duratec and the 1.3 Escort until 2002, as well as in Ford Ikon.

This type of engine still has tappet noise even after adjustment. This noise is said to come from the cams due to incorrect valve setup (when setting valve clearance each cylinder must be set to TDC) or from age and use of incorrect oil grade. The correct oil grade is 5W-30 semi-synthetic oil. Another reason is the large tappet clearance on the exhaust valve. This could be reduced to lower the noise level but the engine would then suffer from a rough idle and usually stall.

Despite Ford's engines being well regarded for their ease of service, the Endura-E has a very awkward placing for its oil filter, at the back of the engine and facing from left to right rather than pointing downwards or out, this being a leftover from the original Kent which was normally mounted longitudinally for rear-wheel drive. This mounting position makes it very difficult to access from underneath the car (without a mechanic's ramp), and despite being very short, the can-type oil filter still manages to protrude past the tip of the adjacent starter motor, meaning it is very difficult to remove using chain-type grips.

Endura-E engine specs (Ka):
Displacement	Power	Torque	Bore	Stroke	Compression ratio	Redline
998 cc	53 PS (39 kW; 52 hp) at 5250 rpm	77 N⋅m (57 lb⋅ft) at 4000 rpm	68.68 mm (2.704 in)	67.4 mm (2.65 in)	9.2:1	5450 rpm
1297 cc	60 PS (44 kW; 59 hp) at 5000 rpm	104 N⋅m (77 lb⋅ft) at 3500 rpm	73.94 mm (2.911 in)	75.5 mm (2.97 in)	8.8:1	5450 rpm

== Motorsport ==
Ford Kent engines had a profound influence on motorsport, possibly more so than any other mass-produced engines did in the history of motorsport. The Satta/Hruska designed Alfa Romeo 750/101 1.3 L (1,290 cc) DOHC engine, and the Alex von Falkenhausen Motorenbau designed SOHC 1.8 L (1,773 cc) BMW M118 engine may have had similar influence on the motorsport scenes in Italy and Germany respectively, but not internationally.

Lotus used Ford Kent engines on Lotus Mk.VII to establish its corporate foundation, and used most of the Cosworth early racing engines for motorsports. Lotus also built the Lotus TwinCam engine for Lotus Elan on the Kent block, crank and conrods.

Cosworth's initial products were all Ford Kent based, and the later SCA, FVA and the BD series used Kent blocks to dominate many FIA categories including Formula 2 and Formula 3.

In addition, many respected racing engine builder/tuners, such as Holbay, Vegantune, Novamotor, Brian Hart, Richardson and Wilcox owe their foundations to the Ford Kent-based engines.

Furthermore, the Kent Crossflow engine was used as the regulation engine in Formula Ford, although it was originally proposed to be the pre-crossflow 1498 cc Cortina GT unit in 1967 (before the establishment of the series). In Europe, Formula Ford switched to the Zetec, but American Formula Ford continued to be Kent-powered until 2010; the SCCA having approved the use of the Honda L15A i-VTEC for Formula F.

As it was nearly impossible to succeed in motorsport without some activities in Formula 2, 3 or Formula Ford, most of the well-known racing drivers in the 1960s, 1970s and 1980s owe their careers to Ford Kent to some extent, and the current historic motor racing depends heavily on the Kent-based engines.

On 16 October 2009, Ford announced that it would be putting the Kent block back into production in order to supply the historic racing community and active Formula Ford series that use the Kent engine with spares. According to a Ford press-release, engineering work began at Ford Racing's Performance Parts division in the US, with sales scheduled to start in 2010. This coincided with a Sports Car Club of America rule change allowing the Honda L15A7 engine to be used in Formula Ford events in that country, which uses the Ford Kent engine (SCCA does not sanction Duratec or Ecoboost classes).

The 1300 cc was the engine of choice for BriSCA Formula 2 Stock Cars until a rule change about carburettors pushed people towards the 2000 cc Ford Pinto engine.

Harry Mundy designed the Lotus TwinCam engine for Colin Chapman, who needed the replacement for the Coventry Climax FWE engine used in Lotus Elite. As Keith Duckworth and Mike Costin, the co-founders of Cosworth, used to be Lotus Development Ltd employees, the initial racing adaptation of Lotus TwinCam was carried out by Cosworth, and the Kent block Cosworth SCA was designed using the basic SOHC reverse-flow cylinder head configuration of the FWE. Due to Mundy being also the co-designer of the FWE, the Kent block Lotus TwinCam initially used the cam profile of the FWE, and shared the same valve clearance adjustment shims with Coventry Climax FWA, FWB, and FWE in production.

== See also ==
- List of Ford engines
- Lotus-Ford Twin Cam engine
- List of early Cosworth engines
