= Proteus (watercraft) =

Experimental wave adaptive catamaran watercraft

History

United States
- Name: Proteus
- Operator: Marine Advanced Robotics, Inc. (Richmond, California)
- Launched: 2007
- Identification: US Official number 1195031
- Status: in active service, as of 2013

General characteristics
- Type: Research vessel
- Tonnage: 51 GT
- Displacement: 12 short tons (laden)
- Length: 95.2 ft (29.0 m)
- Beam: 50 ft (15 m)
- Depth: 4 ft (1.2 m)
- Propulsion: 2x Cummins Quantum Series QSB5.9 355hp
- Speed: 30 knots
- Range: 3,000 nautical miles
- Capacity: 2 short tons payload

Proteus is an experimental watercraft developed by Marine Advanced Robotics, Inc. (formerly Marine Advanced Research). It is the first vessel of the wave adaptive modular vessel-type (WAM-V). The vessel was developed by Ugo Conti. Because of its use of four legs connecting the superstructure to the outriggers, the ship has earned the nickname of "The Spider Ship" or "Spider Boat". The unusual design attracted public attention during early trials, before it even had a registration number.

== Construction ==
Proteus is similar in design to a catamaran, in that it uses a twin hull design and no keel. Unlike most catamarans however, the superstructure is not rigidly attached to the hulls. The vessel uses titanium shock absorbers to travel with the waves in the ocean, rather than through them. This method should theoretically allow it to move faster through the water while burning less fuel, however sea trials are yet to be completed. Hogging and sagging should also be reduced as well.

The vessel is 100 feet (30 m) long, while its beam is 50 feet (15 m) allowing for relatively normal initial stability coefficient of 2:1. Its draft fluctuates more than a traditional ship, but at half load it is 8 inches (200 mm) at the bow and 16 inches (410 mm) at the stern. Because of the ship's limited draft and inflatable hulls it is able to be beached without damage. The ship's bridge, cargo hold and berthing for four are located in the cabin that hangs down from the four legs. The cabin can be lowered into the water 20 feet (6.1 m) below and can run under its own power. It has been designed this way to allow offshore anchoring of the seadrive section of the craft, while allowing the cabin to be moored in a marina.

The Proteus is constructed of titanium, aluminum and reinforced fabrics. The ship's displacement is 12 tons when carrying its maximum cargo of 2 tons. Its outriggers store the 2,000 gallons of fuel that power the two Cummins Marine Diesel Quantum Series QSB5.9 355 horsepower engines at their sterns.

== Press release ==
On September 7, 2007, Daniel Basta, director of the National Marine Sanctuaries for the National Oceanographic and Atmospheric Administration, stated that Proteus is a wave adaptive modular vessel (designed for military uses, biological studies, ocean exploration and sea rescue). It is a lightweight, low cost and modular craft, which can travel 5,000 miles (8,000 km) on 2,000 imperial gallons (9,100 L) of diesel fuel. Proteus will be able to launch and recover crewed or uncrewed vehicles as well as engage in remote vehicle operations. Its first appearance in New York City is the 4th leg of a tour that began in San Francisco in January and will end in Washington, D.C. Ugo Conti (Italian engineer and oceanographer who designed Proteus) and his wife, Isabella Conti, are co-founders of Marine Advanced Robotics, Inc., a Richmond, California-based firm that created the Proteus for $1.5 million. The Proteus has a maximum a speed of 30 knots (34.5 mph).
