= Ford Valencia Body and Assembly =

Automotive manufacturing plant in Spain

Coordinates: 39.319°N 0.413°W

Ford Valencia Body and Assembly (VB&A) is an automobile manufacturing plant owned by the Ford Motor Company and located in Almussafes on the southern edge of the Valencian Community, Spain. With a production capacity of 450,000 vehicles a year and 8,000 employees in 2019, it is Ford's largest manufacturing complex outside the United States.

== Origins ==
In 1973 the Ford Motor Company headed by Henry Ford II purchased 270 acres (1.1 km^{2}) of orchard on the edge of Valencia. Exactly 1,000 days later, on 18 October 1976, the first Ford Fiesta rolled off the production line. Just a week after that, on 25 October 1976, the king formally inaugurated the plant. Construction had cost 680 million dollars.

At the time when the plant was planned, the dictator Francisco Franco was still in charge of the Spanish government which pursued a fiercely mercantilist economic policy. The relatively short period that elapsed between the submission by Ford, on 23 December 1972, of their plan to the government and the plant's inauguration was seen as evidence of the government's enthusiasm for the project. The domestic auto-industry at this time was nevertheless strongly protected, comprising partnerships between foreign automakers and Madrid based interests. (most notably that between SEAT and Fiat). There was a requirement that Spanish built cars should incorporate at least 95% "domestic content" with any imported components subject to a 30% tariff: there was a further requirement that none of the foreign automakers could hold more than 49% of the capital of a Spanish-based car manufacturer. Negotiations took place between Ford executive Dick Holmes and the Spanish government to secure a less restrictive framework for the Ford project in view of the size and potential benefit to Spain from the investment, but Ford were still required to commit to exporting two thirds of the plant's production outside Spain (which seems to have aligned with their existing objectives), and restricting their penetration of the Spanish domestic auto-market to less than 10%. Political changes following Franco's death later culminated with Spain joining the European Economic Community in 1986 which rendered these restrictions redundant.

The plant was built and fitted out under the leadership of Hanns Brand, who had previously been responsible for building Ford's recently opened Saarlouis plant, which provided the blue-print for the Valencia project. The plant began manufacturing engines (the Kent/Valencia unit) in April 1976, with the first Fiestas coming off the line in October of that year.

The Fiesta was seen as the right car for the times, and at the opening of the plant it was described as the model which might overtake the fifteen million sales of the Ford Model T. The Spanish market waiting list for the car exceeded a year in April 1977.

== Output ==
After the 1973 Oil Shock persuaded Ford to move ahead with the production of a Renault 5 competitor, the plant under construction in Valencia became the obvious location for the car's production. When it opened, the plant was the designated Fiesta production facility for Europe, though after Franco's death it also assembled Escort models. Ford-based Mazda vehicles have also been assembled at the Valencia plant.

The plant has produced over 9 million cars and was recently producing at the rate of 2,000 units per day.

In June 2022, Ford announced it will produce its future electric models at its Valencia plant, leaving the future of the Saarlouis Body & Assembly plant past 2025 uncertain.

In July 2026, Ford and Chinese automaker Geely agreed to form a new joint venture that would manufacture models from both brands at the Valencia plant starting 2028, including a multi-energy Ford compact crossover developed on Geely's Global Intelligent New Energy Architecture platform and two electric Geely SUVs that will be the first Geely-branded models built in Europe; its parent company already builds vehicles in Europe through its Volvo (which it bought from Ford in 2010), LEVC and Lotus businesses. When the deal is finalised in 2027, Ford will hold 66% and Geely will hold the remaining 34%.

== Employment ==
In 1977 the plant employed 7,500 workers, and there was talk of this increasing to 10,000 as full capacity was reached.

More recently, in 2006, with auto-production processes increasingly automated and Ford Europe suffering from serious over-capacity, the plant still had approximately 7,000 employees, and was estimated to account for 21,000 jobs when ancillary suppliers were included in the calculation. The plant is reckoned to account for 8.2% of the economic output of Valencia.

== Products ==
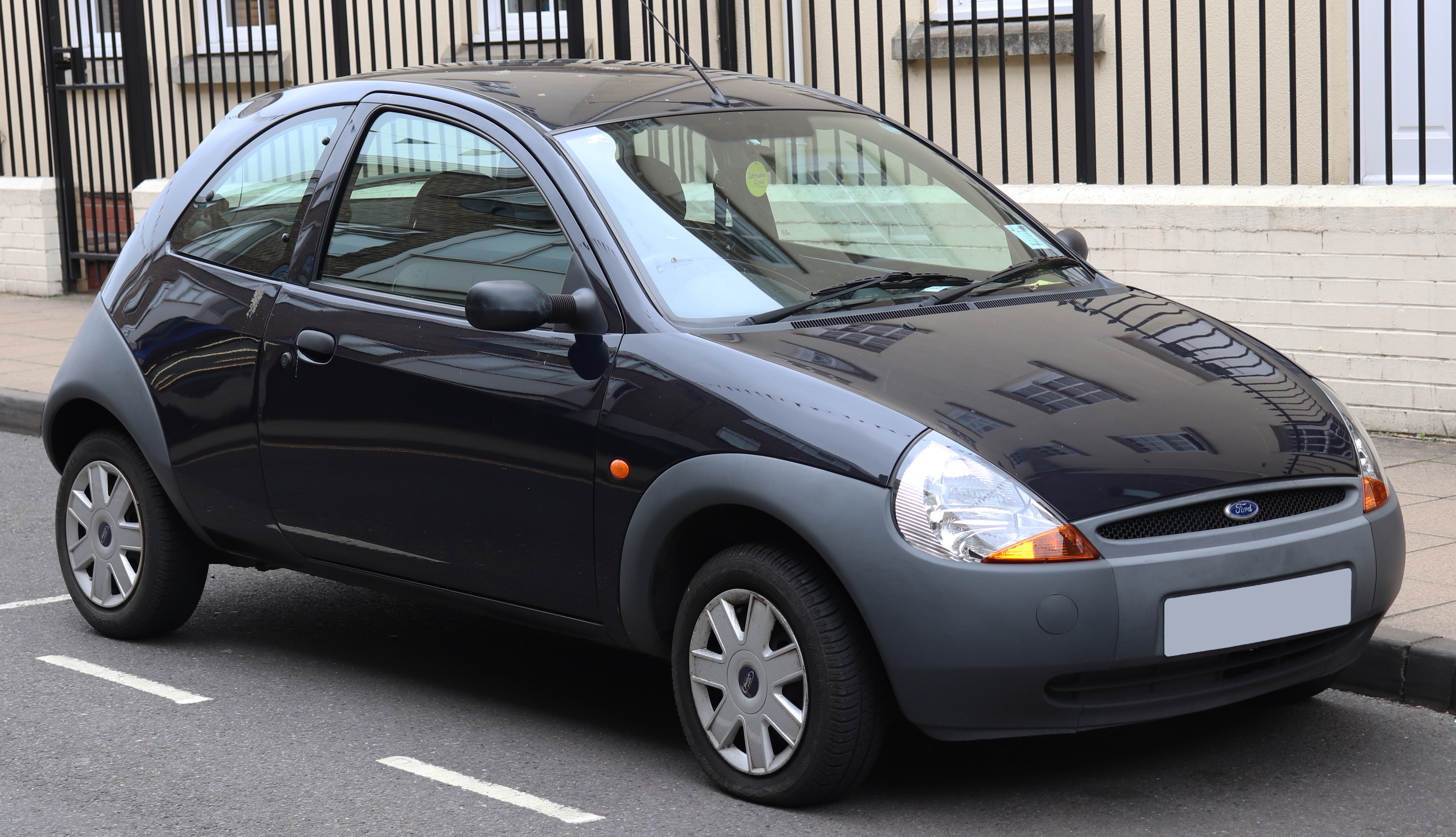
2007 Ford Ka

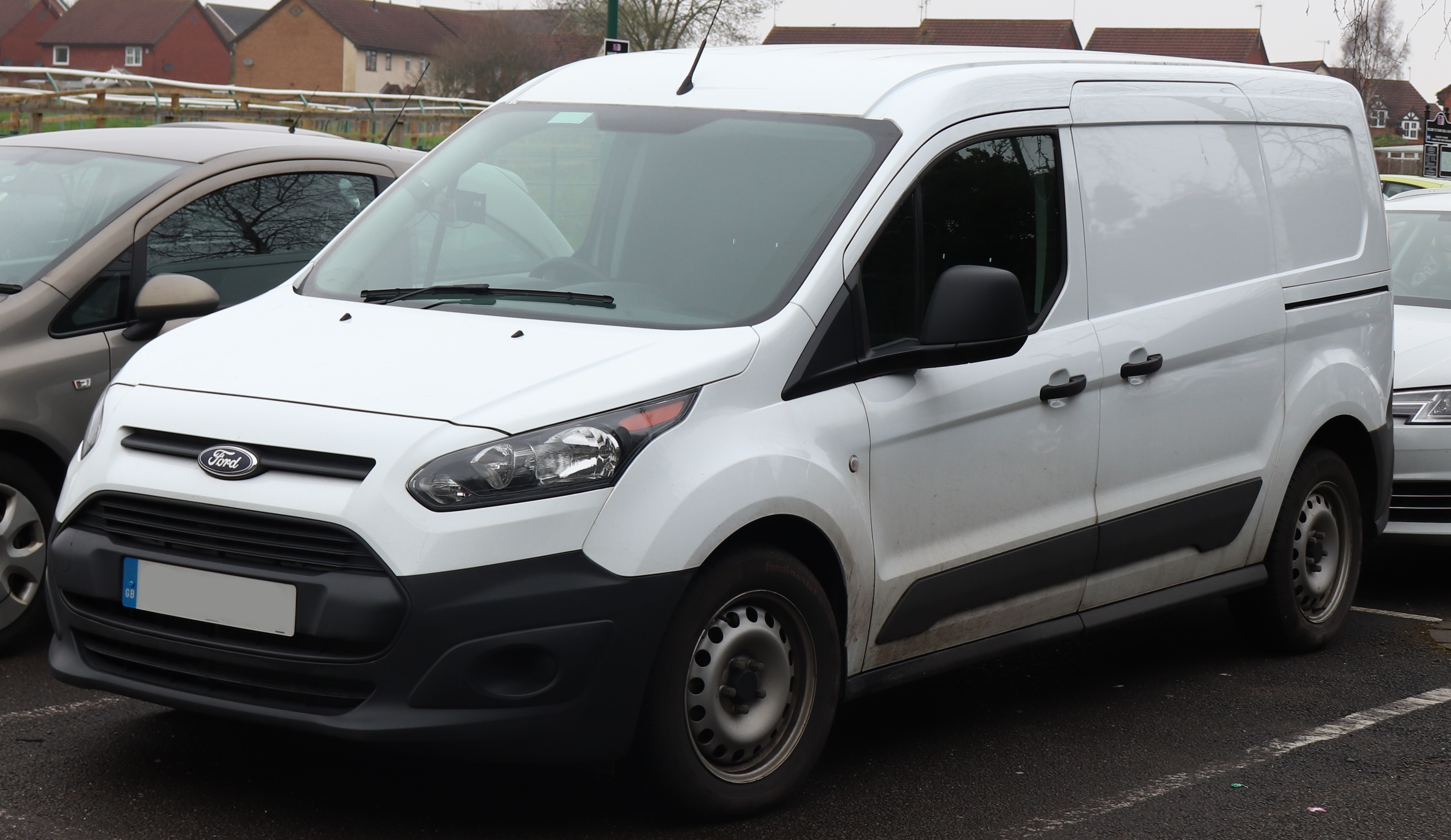
2016 Ford Transit Connect

=== Past ===
- Ford Fiesta (1976–2012)
- Ford Escort (1981–1998)
- Ford Orion (1983–1993)
- Ford Ka (1996–2008)
- Ford Focus (1998–2011)
- Mazda2 (2002–2007)
- Ford C-Max (2010–2015)
- Ford Galaxy (2015–2023)
- Ford Mondeo (2014–2022)
- Ford Transit Connect (2013–2022)
- Ford S-Max (2015–2023)
- Ford Escape (Australian and New Zealand markets) (2016–2026)

=== Current ===
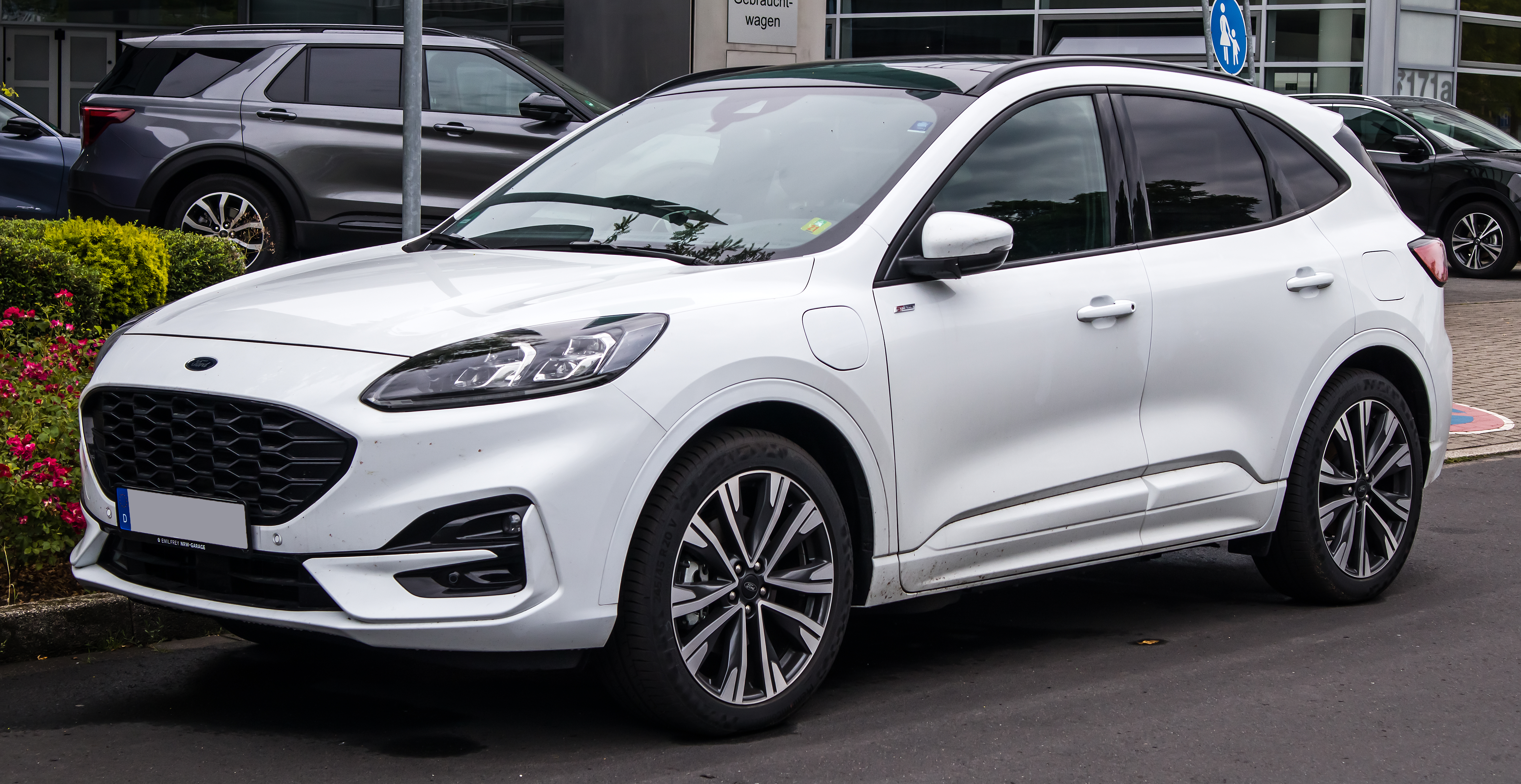
2021 Ford Kuga

- Ford Kuga (2013–present)

== See also ==
- List of Ford factories
