= Ford Consul Classic =

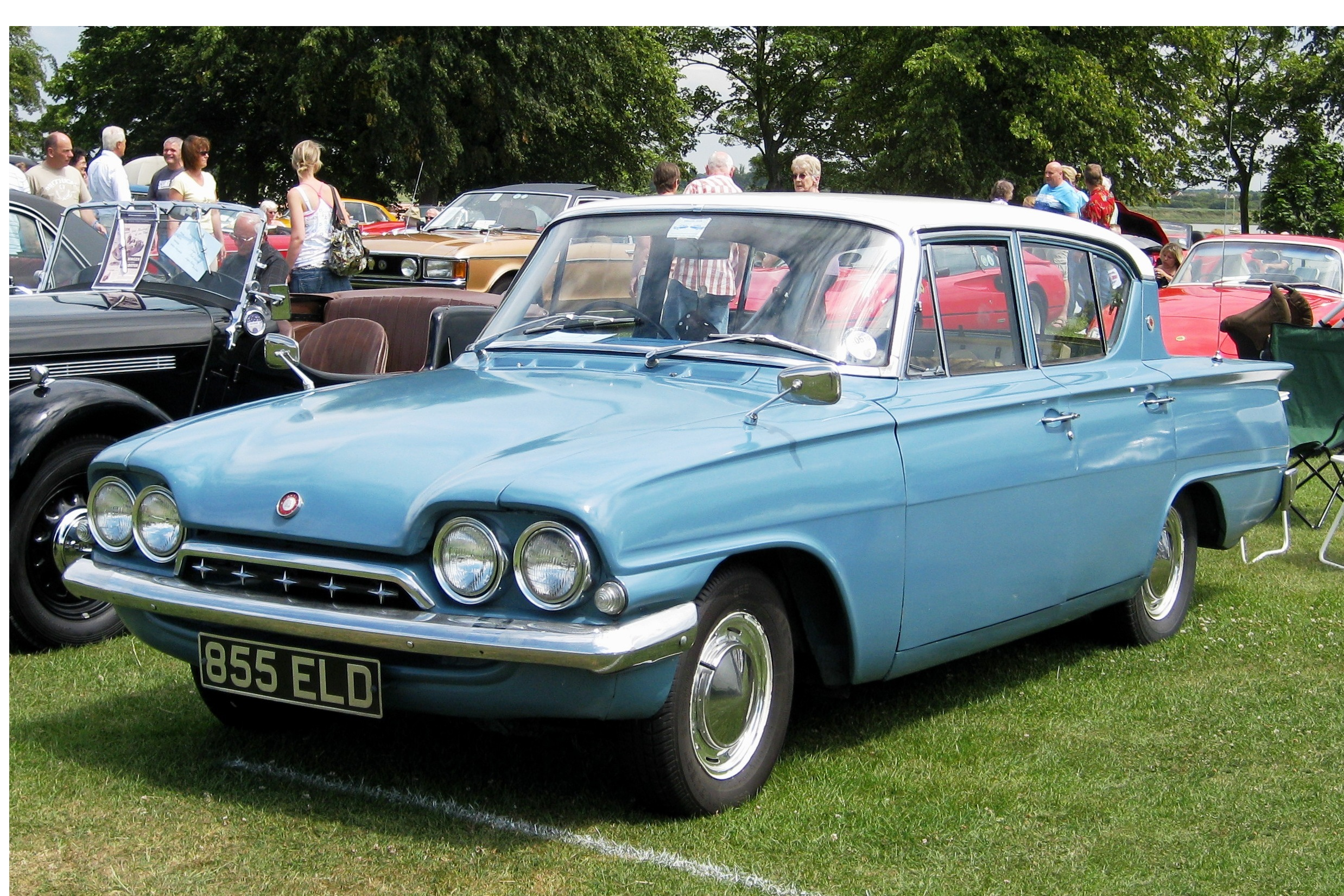
- Ford Consul Classic 4-door saloon

Overview
- Manufacturer: Ford
- Also called: Ford Consul 315 (export markets)
- Production: 1961–1963
- Assembly: United Kingdom; New Zealand

Body and chassis
- Class: Mid-size / Large family car (D)
- Body style: 2-door saloon 4-door saloon
- Related: Ford Consul Capri (335)

Powertrain
- Engine: 1.3 or 1.5 L Straight-4

Dimensions
- Wheelbase: 99 in (2,515 mm)
- Length: 170.75 in (4,337 mm)
- Width: 65 in (1,651 mm)
- Height: 56 in (1,422 mm)
- Curb weight: 2070 pounds (940 kg)

Chronology
- Predecessor: Ford Prefect
- Successor: Ford Corsair

The Ford Consul Classic is a mid-sized car that was launched in May 1961 and built by Ford UK from 1961 to 1963. It was available in two or four door saloon form, in Standard or De Luxe versions, and with floor or column gearshift. The name Ford Consul 315 was used for export markets. The Ford Consul Capri was a 2-door coupé version of the Classic, and was available from 1961 until 1964.

The 1,340 cc (82 cu in) four-cylinder pre-crossflow Kent engine was replaced in August 1962 by an over-square 1,498 cc (91.4 cu in) engine with a new five-bearing crankshaft and a new gearbox with synchromesh on all four forward ratios. Steering and suspension also received "greased for life" joints.

It is sometimes referred to as the Ford 109E, though that was only one of four such codes utilized for the Consul Classic, as explained below. Obvious competitor models at the time included the Hillman Minx and Singer Gazelle from Rootes Group.

== Ford Classic model codes ==
The Classic (and related Consul Capri) had the right-hand-drive and home market Ford code of 109E (but 110E if L.H.D.) for 1961–1962 models with 1340cc engines, or 116E (but 117E for L.H.D.) for 1962–63 manufacture with 1500cc engines. Those codes also distinguish the gearboxes and steering components which are not greasable on later cars, so cutting first-user servicing costs.

Despite all these codes the cars all looked the same throughout production 1961–1963, the visual distinctions being the number of doors, the trim & equipment level between Standard and De Luxe and the choice of colours.

== Concept and development ==
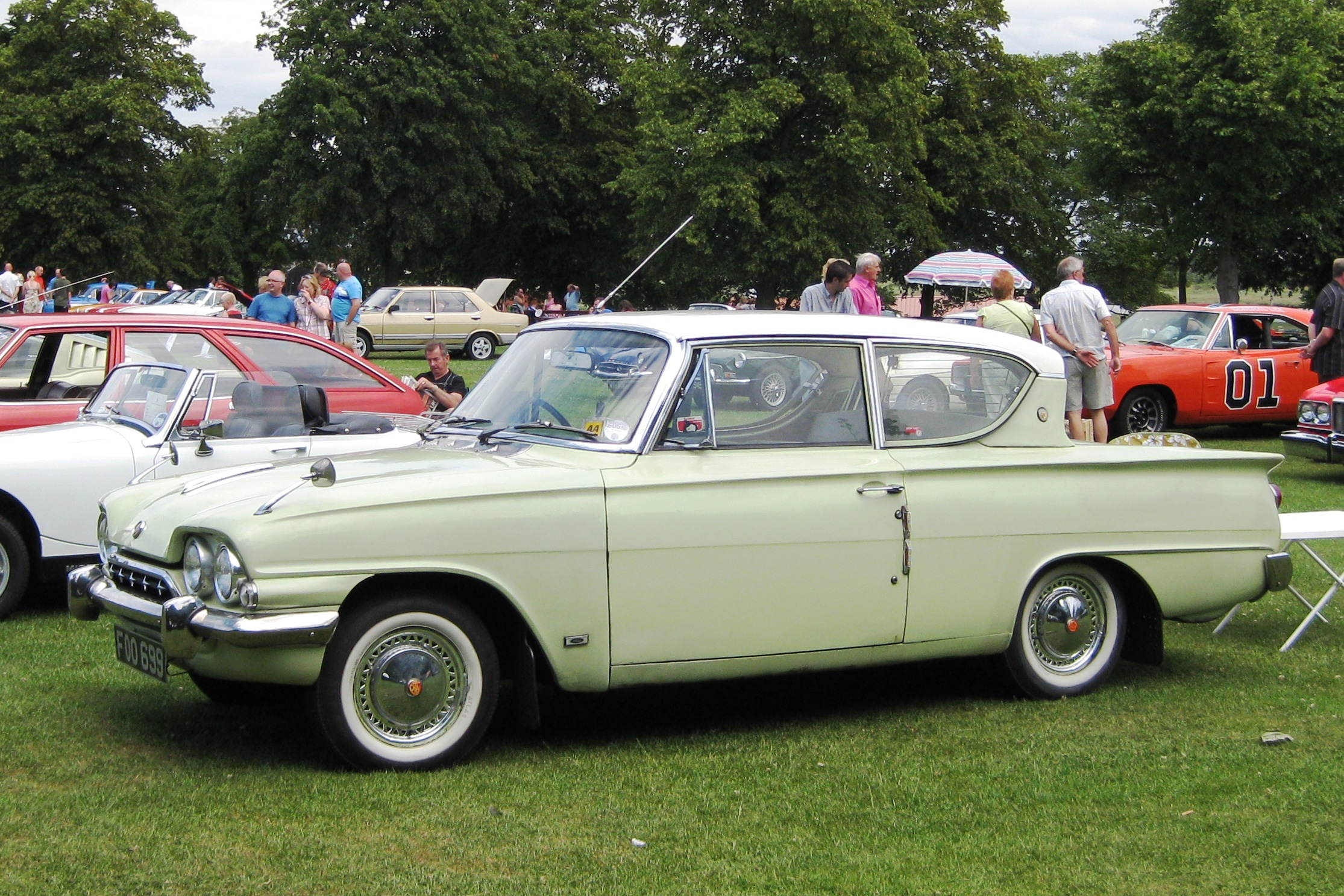

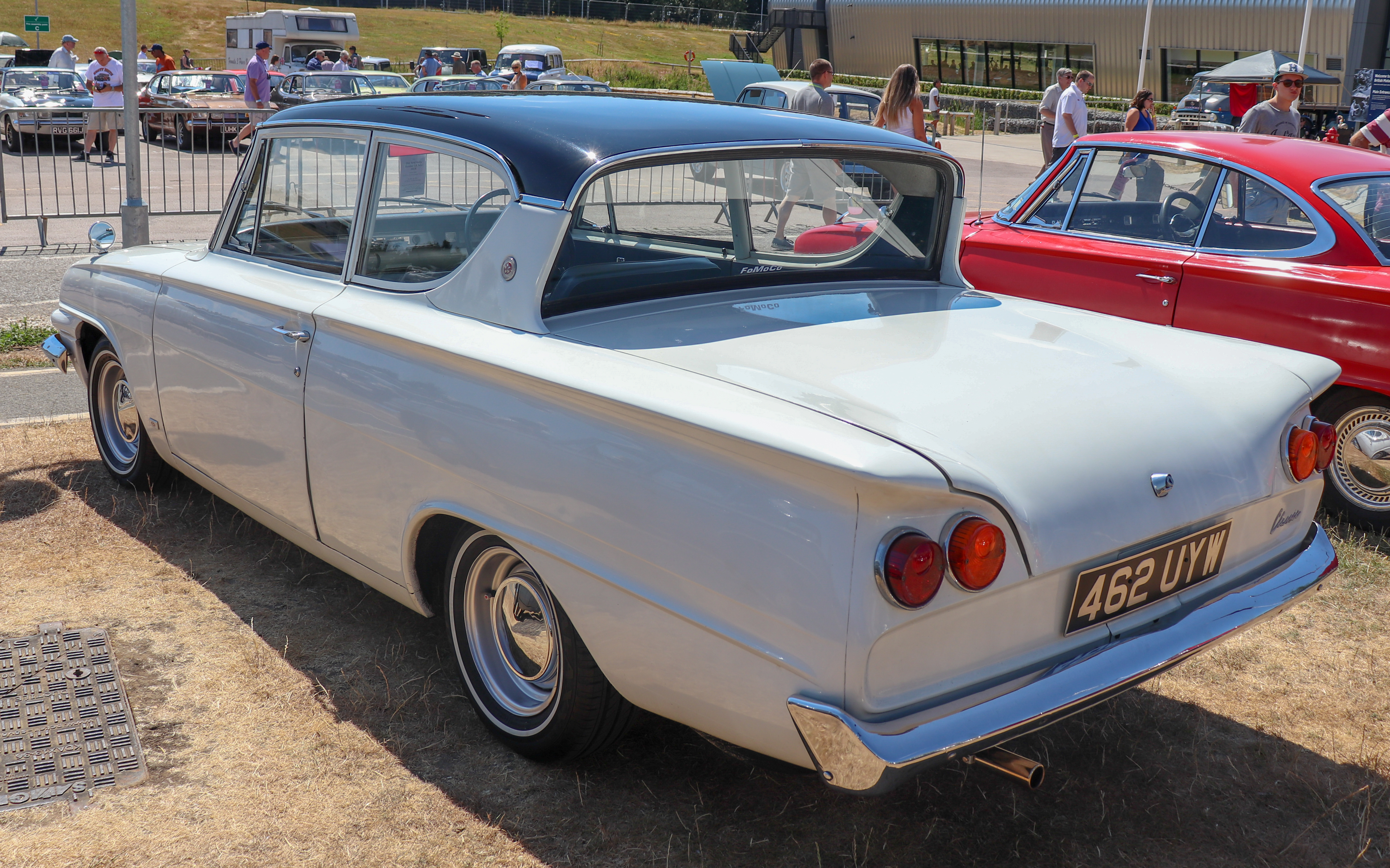
Ford Consul Classic 2-door

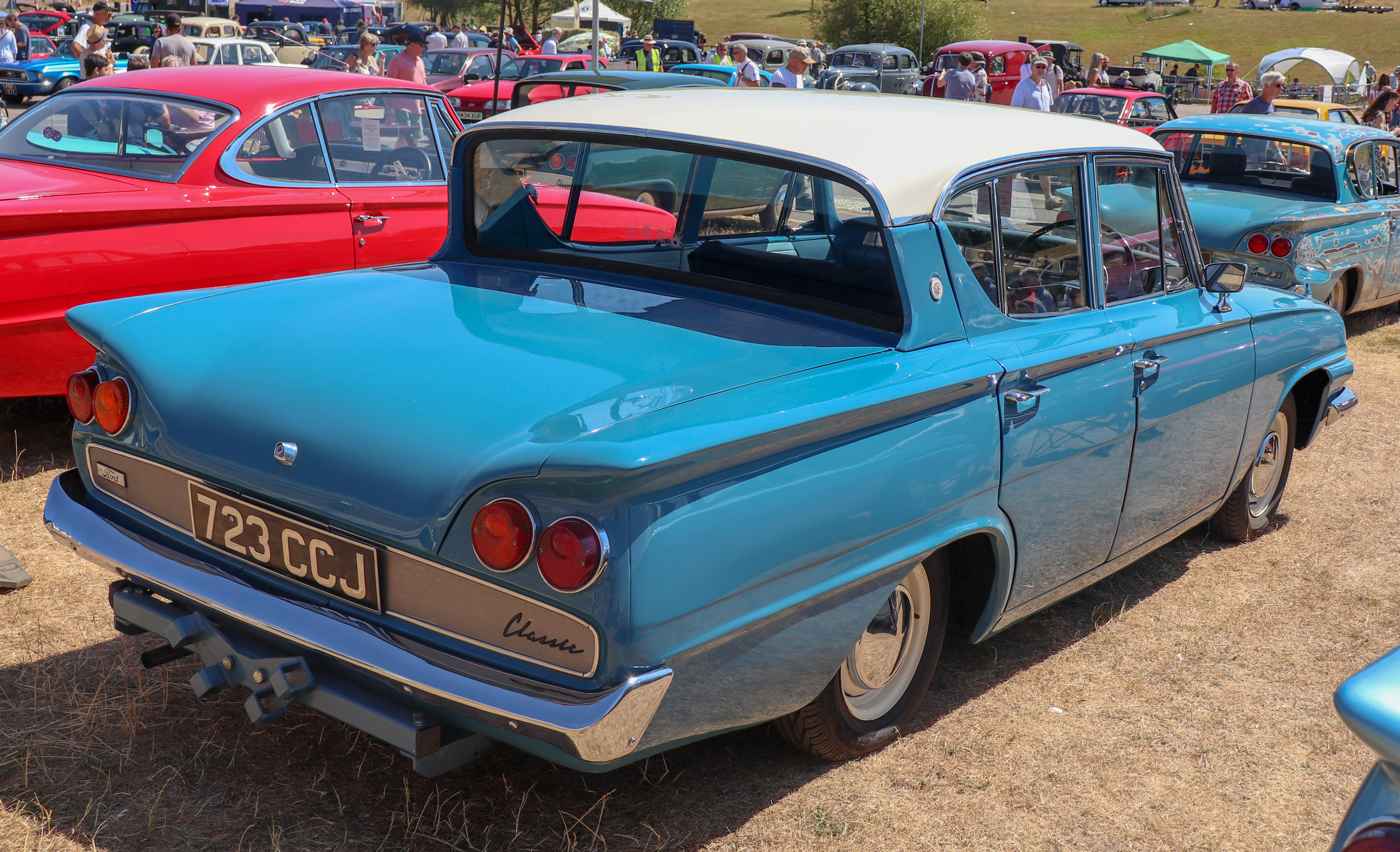
Ford Consul Classic 4-door

The Classic was made by Ford to be "suitable for the golf club car park", and was originally intended for introduction earlier and deletion later than actually occurred. The styling exercises were mainly undertaken in 1956 under Colin Neale. The main styling cues came straight from Dearborn (Michigan) as they often did, defining the car as a scaled-down Galaxie 500, from the waist down, topped with a Lincoln Continental roofline. Other aspects of R&D followed, and it is likely that a recognisably similar car could have been introduced in 1959 subject to different senior management decisions. In practice the run-away early success of the Anglia (1959 on) used up most of the car manufacturing capacity at Dagenham, vindicating the decision to compete against the BMC Mini (the Halewood plant did not open until 1963). Ford therefore entered the 1960s with the small Anglia, Popular and Prefect, the big "three graces" (Consul, Zephyr and Zodiac) launched back in 1956, and not the mid-size market Classic.

== Description ==
The Ford Classic was similar in appearance to the more popular Ford Anglia, featuring the same distinctive reverse-rake rear window. This feature was imported from the 1958 Lincoln Continental where it was necessitated by the design requirement for an opening ("breezeway") rear window. With quad headlamps and different frontal treatment it was longer, wider and so heavier than the Anglia. In fact, from the windows down the body design was a scaled-down version of Ford's large, US Ford Galaxie. Inside, the separate front seats and rear bench had a standard covering of PVC but leather was available as an option. There was a choice of floor-mounted or column-mounted gear change. Single or two-tone paint schemes were offered. Several of the car's features, unusual at the time, have subsequently become mainstream such as the headlight flasher ("found on many Continental cars") and the variable speed windscreen wipers. The boot or trunk capacity was exceptionally large, with a side-stowed spare-wheel well, and more importantly, the huge high-lift sprung lid allowed a great variety of loads to be both contemplated and packed. At 21 cubic feet, this was 15% larger than the Zodiac MK2 and had obvious advantages for business use.

The Consul Classic was also mechanically similar to the Anglia, and used slightly larger 1340 cc and, from 1962, 1498 cc, variants of the Ford Kent engine. The car had front 9.5 in (241 mm) disc brakes and was fitted with a four-speed gearbox: early cars provided synchromesh on the top three ratios, while the arrival of the 1498 cc version coincided with the provision of synchromesh on all forward gears. Suspension was independent at the front using MacPherson struts, and at the rear the live axle used semi elliptic leaf springs. A contemporary road tester was impressed, noting that "probably the most impressive thing about the Classic is its road holding".

== Performance ==
A car tested by The Motor magazine in 1961 had a top speed of 78.4 mph (126.2 km/h) and could accelerate from 0-60 mph (97 km/h) in 22.5 seconds. A fuel consumption of 35.8 miles per imperial gallon (7.9 L/100 km; 29.8 mpg_{‑US}) was recorded. The test car was a 4-door deluxe version costing £801 including taxes, but the sticker price on a two-door standard Classic with the same engine was just £745 including taxes.

== Replacement ==
The Consul Classic was complex and expensive to produce and was replaced in October 1963 by the Ford Corsair which was largely based on Ford Cortina components. Only 111,225 Classics and 18,716 Capris were produced (Including 2002 'GT' Versions). These are small numbers by Ford standards, and probably indicative of the public not taking to the controversial styling along with the availability of the cheaper, similar-sized Cortina.

== Consul Capri ==
Ford Consul Capri
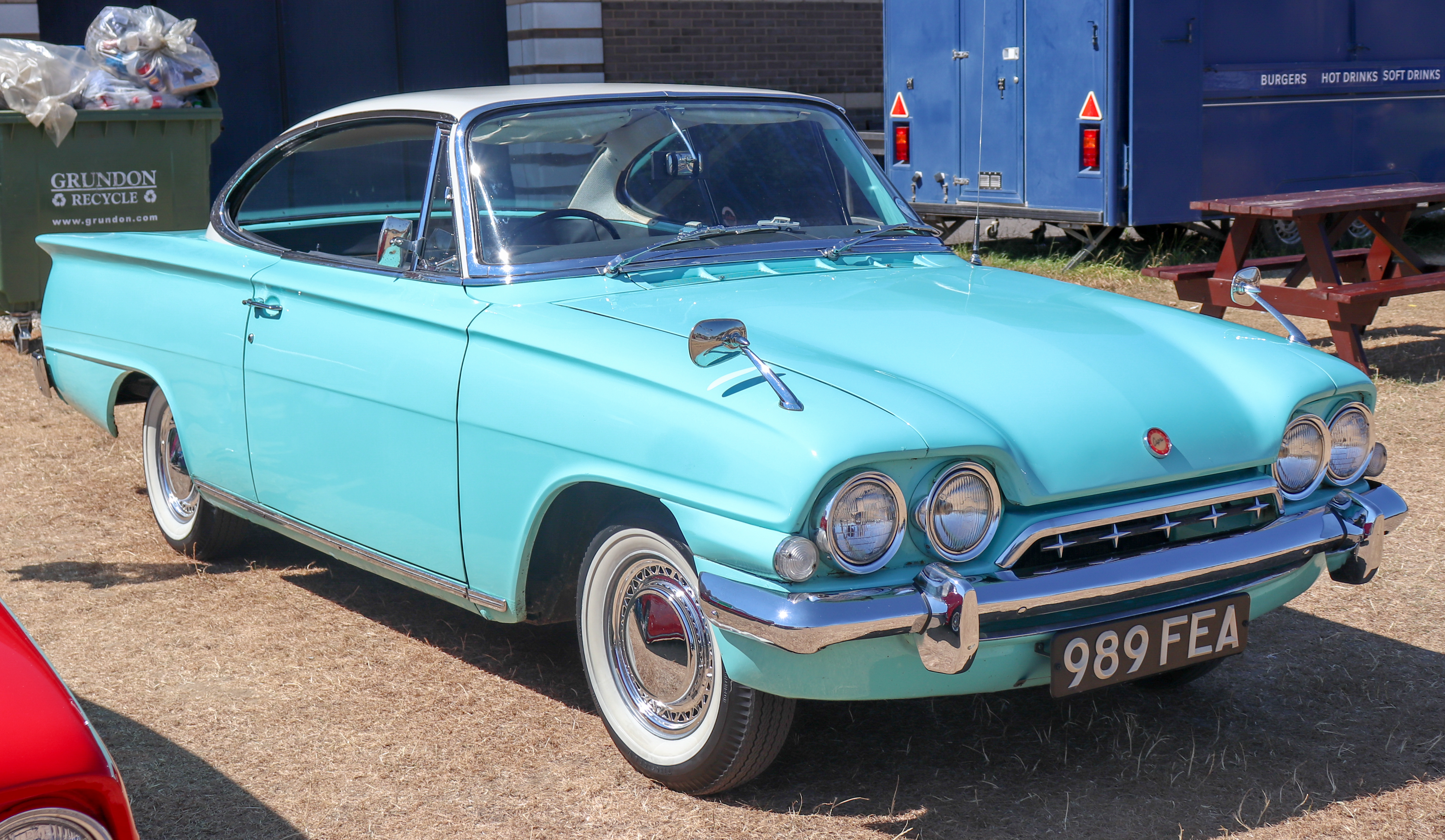
- 1962 Ford Consul Capri

Overview
- Manufacturer: Ford of Britain
- Production: 1961–1964

Body and chassis
- Body style: 2-door hardtop
- Related: Ford Consul Classic

Powertrain
- Engine: 1340 cc I4 (OHV); 1498 cc I4 (OHV)

Dimensions
- Wheelbase: 99 in (2,515 mm)
- Length: 170.75 in (4,337 mm)
- Width: 65.3 in (1,659 mm)
- Height: 54 in (1,372 mm)
- Kerb weight: 2,100 lb (953 kg) approx

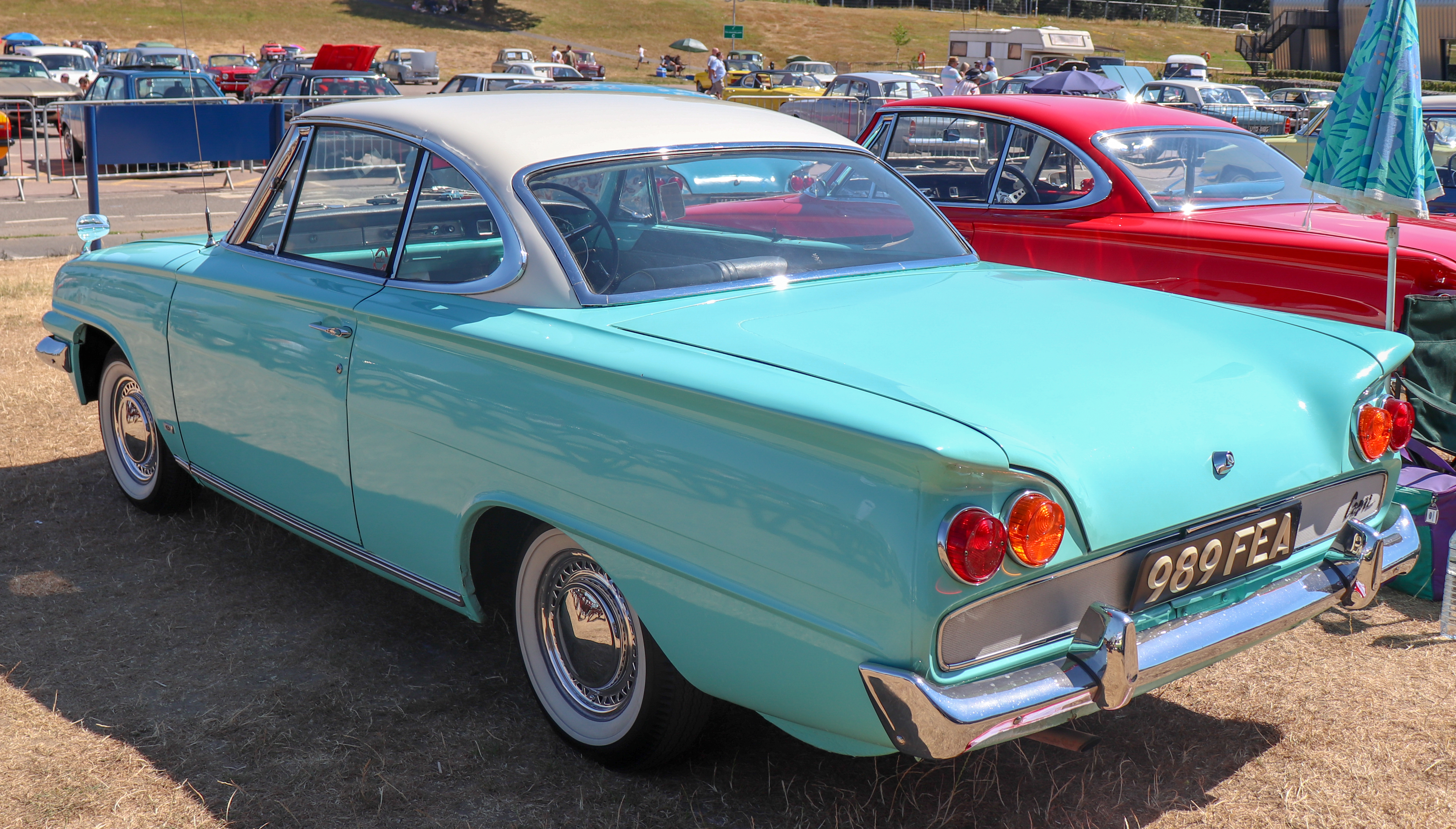
Rear

The Consul Capri was a two-door coupé version of the Classic saloon made by Ford of Britain.

The Capri Project was code named "Sunbird" and took design elements from the Ford Thunderbird and the Ford Galaxie Starliner. It was instigated by Sir Horace Denne, Ford's Sales Export Director. He wanted a "co-respondent's" car to add glamour to the product line. It was designed by Charles Thompson who worked under Colin Neale and had sweeping lines, a large boot space and a pillarless coupé roof.

On its September 1961 announcement, the Consul Capri was available for export only, but went on sale to the domestic British market in January 1962. The bodies were sub-assembled by Pressed Steel Company, with only final assembly of the drivetrain taking place at Dagenham and from February 1963 at Halewood. It was intended as part of the Ford Classic range of cars but the body was complex and expensive to produce. With new production methods, time demands from Dearborn and a need to match opposition manufacturers in price, the Ford Classic and Consul Capri were almost doomed from the start.

The Consul Capri was fitted with a variety of Ford Classic De-Luxe features, including four headlights, variable speed wipers, 9.5 in (241 mm) front disc brakes, dimming dashboard lights and a cigar lighter. The four-speed transmission was available with either a column or floor change. It was proclaimed as "The First Personal car from Ford of Great Britain" (Ford of Great Britain, sales literature, December 1961).

Initially fitted with a 1340 cc three-main-bearing engine (model 109E), the early cars were considered underpowered and suffered from premature crankshaft failure. Engine capacity was increased in August 1962 to 1498 cc (model 116E) and this engine with its new five-bearing crankshaft was an improvement. The first 200 Capris were left-hand-drive cars for export including Europe and North America. In Germany, at the 1961 Frankfurt Auto show, Ford sold 88 Capris.

In February 1963 a 2+2 GT version (also 116E) was announced. The new GT engine, developed by Cosworth, featured a raised compression ratio to 9:1, a modified head with larger exhaust valves, an aluminium inlet manifold, a four branch exhaust manifold and, most noticeably, a twin-choke Weber carburettor – this being the first use of this make on a British production car. The same engine was announced for use in the Ford Cortina in April 1963. The Consul Capri was the first Ford to use "GT"(76CV DIN/83CV SAE) as a model derivative worldwide.

Overall the car was very expensive to produce and in the latter part of its production was running alongside the very popular Ford Cortina. Sales were disappointing and the Consul Capri was removed from sale after two and a half years with 19,421 sold, of which 2002 were GT models. 1007 cars were sold in 1964, the last year of production, 412 of them being GTs. The Consul Capri was discontinued in July 1964. The Consul Capri (335) is one of the rarest cars from Ford of Great Britain.

A Capri was tested by the British The Motor magazine in 1962 and had a top speed of 79.0 mph (127.1 km/h) and could accelerate from 0-60 mph (97 km/h) in 22.6 seconds. A fuel consumption of 36.7 miles per imperial gallon (7.7 L/100 km; 30.6 mpg_{‑US}) was recorded. The test car cost £915 including taxes of £288.

=== New Zealand ===
The Ford Consul Classic was sold in New Zealand as the Ford Consul 315, in line with other export markets, and was assembled from Knock-down kits at the Ford New Zealand assembly plant in Petone, Lower Hutt, North Island. Ford New Zealand imported all Ford Consul Capris fully built up. The Petone plant had assembled Ford motor vehicles since 1936.

== Ford Classic revival ==
In July 2012 the "Ford Classic" name returned when Ford India rebranded their "Ford Fiesta Classic" model - effectively a Ford Fiesta Mark V with a boot/trunk - as the "Ford Classic".
