= Protea (car) =

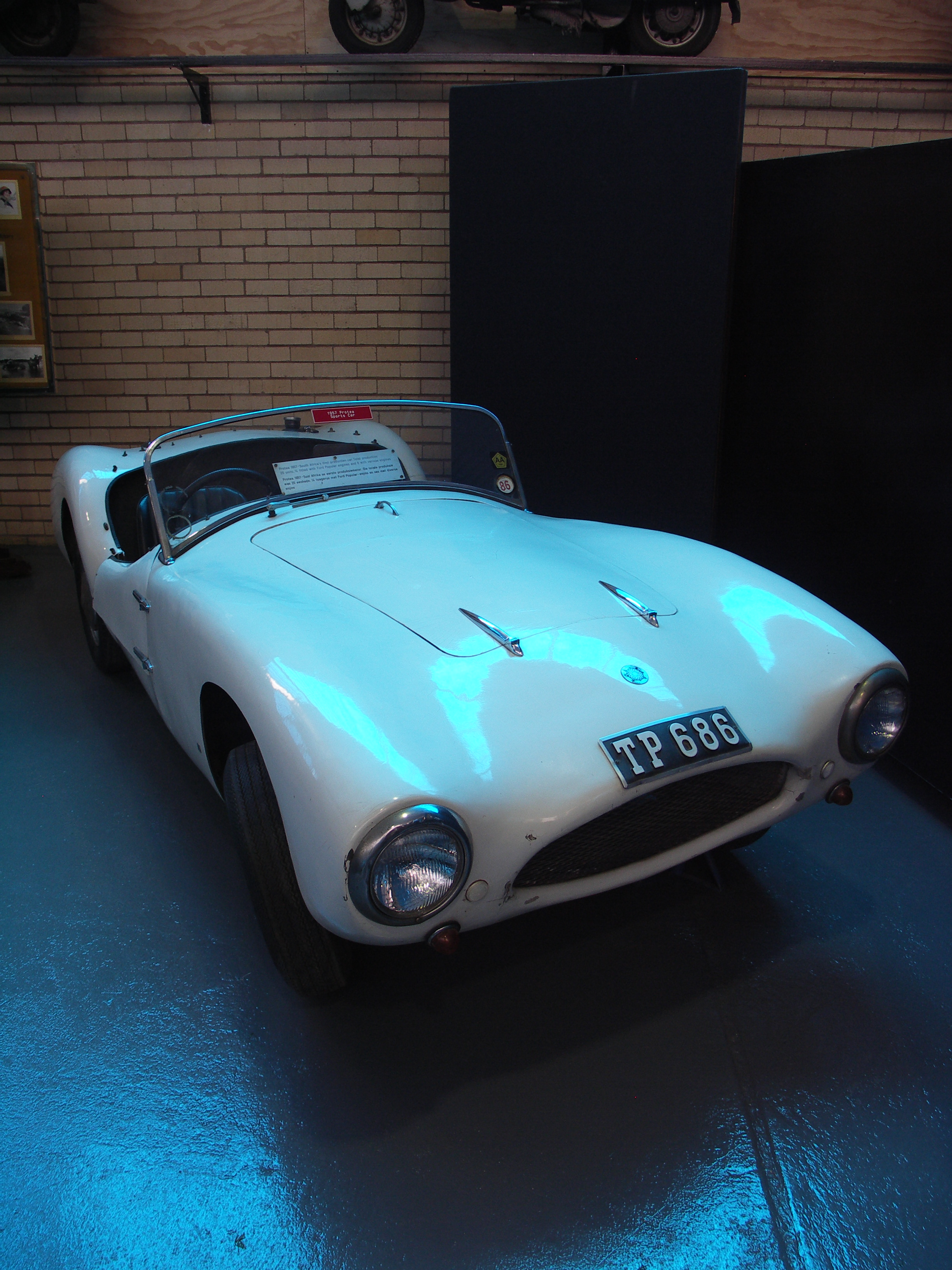
- The Protea on display at the James Hall Transport Museum.

Overview
- Manufacturer: G.R.P. Engineering
- Production: 1957–1958
- Assembly: South Africa

Body and chassis
- Class: Sports car
- Body style: Two door, Roadster

Powertrain
- Engine: 1,172 cubic centimetres (71.5 cu in), 4 cylinder, 27.6 kW @ 4500 r/min

The Protea was South Africa's first production car. The two seater sports car was built in Johannesburg by G.R.P. Engineering between 1957 and 1958. Either 14 or 26 units were completed (Sources vary). The Protea was the first South African sports car, followed less than 6 months later by the Glass Sport Motors with their Dart and later Flamingo.

== Known survivors ==
- A fully restored Protea can be found in the collection at the Franschhoek Motor Museum
- The James Hall Museum of Transport in Johannesburg has one example on show.
- Pieter du Toit of Zwartkops raceway owns one.
- There is another privately owned Protea in Roodepoort, a suburb on Johannesburg's West Rand.
- There is another privately owned Protea in Pretoria North, currently in the process of being restored.
