= Alfa Romeo =

Italian automotive manufacturer

Alfa Romeo Automobiles S.p.A.
- Type: Subsidiary
- Industry: Automotive
- Founded: 24 June 1910; 116 years ago (as A.L.F.A.); Milan, Lombardy, Kingdom of Italy
- Founders: Ugo Stella; Nicola Romeo
- Headquarters: Turin, Italy
- Area served: Worldwide
- Key people: Santo Ficili (CEO)
- Products: Cars
- Production output: 69,600 units (2023)
- Brands: Quadrifoglio
- Parent: Stellantis Europe
- Website: alfaromeo.com

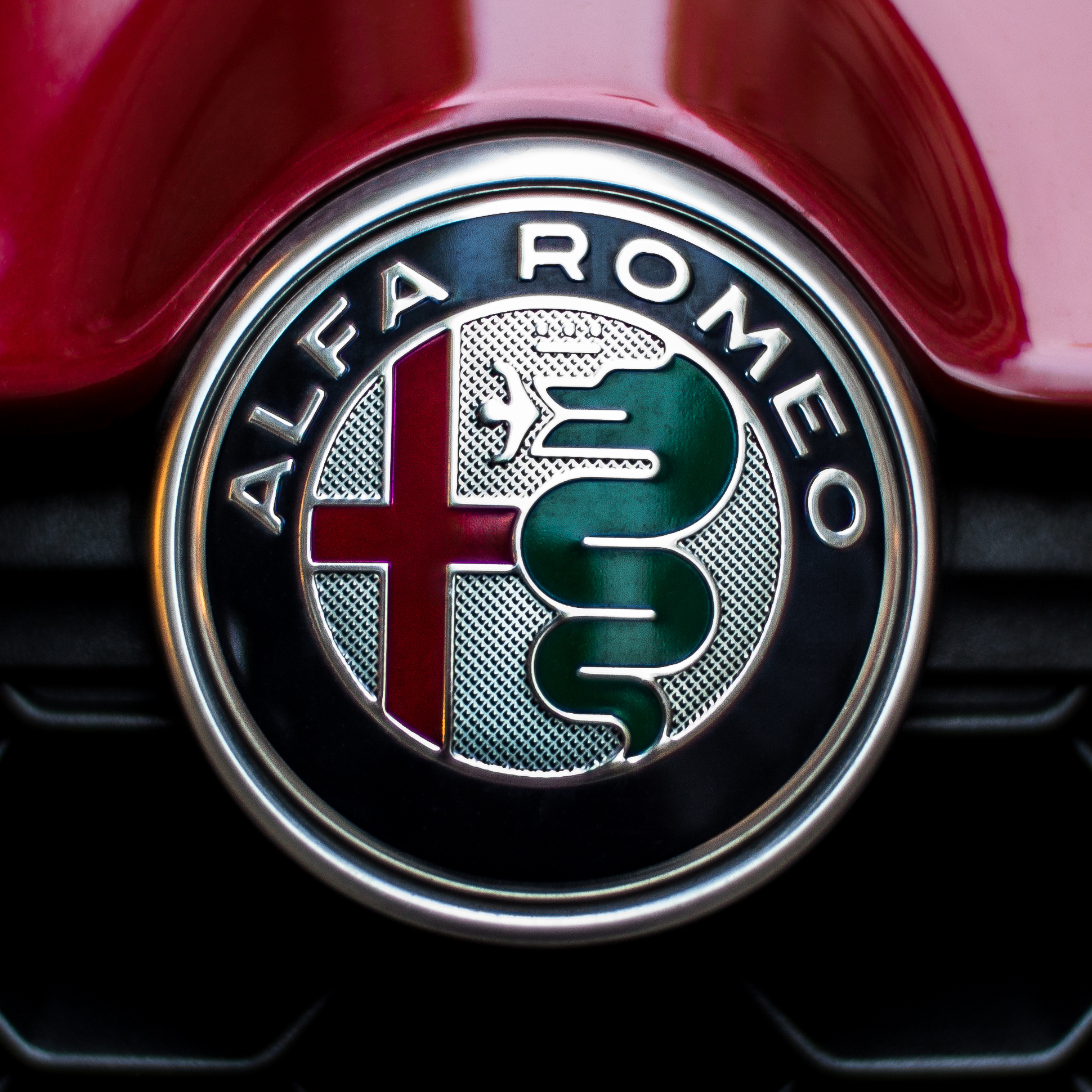
Previous Alfa logo, on the hood of a car

Alfa Romeo Automobiles S.p.A. (Italian: [ˈalfa roˈmɛːo]) is an Italian car manufacturer known for its sports-oriented vehicles, strong auto racing heritage, and distinct design. Headquartered in Turin, Italy, it is a subsidiary of Stellantis Europe and one of 14 brands of multinational automotive company Stellantis.

Founded on 24 June 1910 in Milan, Italy as A.L.F.A.—an acronym for Anonima Lombarda Fabbrica Automobili (Note: Anonima refers to the legal structure of the company at the time, Società anonima.)—the company was established by Cavaliere Ugo Stella to acquire the assets of the ailing Italian subsidiary of French carmaker Darracq, of which he had been an investor and manager. Its first car was the 24 HP, designed by Giuseppe Merosi, which became commercially successful and participated in the 1911 Targa Florio endurance race.

In August 1915, ALFA was acquired by Neapolitan entrepreneur and engineer Nicola Romeo, who vastly expanded the company's portfolio to include heavy machinery and aircraft engines. In 1920, the company's name was changed to Alfa Romeo, with the Torpedo 20–30 HP being the first vehicle to bear the new brand.

Through the 1920s, Alfa Romeo produced several successful road and race cars, and was well represented in prominent European motorsport events, notably winning the inaugural AIACR World Manufacturers' Championship at the 1925 Grand Prix season. Nevertheless, the company soon faced financial troubles, leading to Romeo's contentious departure in 1928 and Italian government ownership in 1933.

Under the control of the industrial organization Institute for Industrial Reconstruction (IRI), Alfa Romeo initially continued making its signature custom luxury vehicles, but following the financial hardship of World War II, shifted to mass-producing small vehicles. In 1954, it launched the Giulietta series of family cars and developed the Alfa Romeo Twin Cam engine, which would remain in production until 1994.

Alfa Romeo became known for producing mass-market vehicles that nonetheless blended the aesthetics and performance of sport and luxury marques. Despite its strong brand image and relatively sizeable share of the high-performance auto market in Europe, by the 1970s, the company was operating at a loss, prompting IRI to sell it to Fiat Group in 1986.

Alfa Romeo has since maintained its distinct identity and brand through several ownership changes, including Fiat's merger with the American Chrysler Group in 2014, forming Fiat Chrysler Automobiles (FCA), and FCA's subsequent merger in 2021 with the French PSA Group to form Stellantis.

Alfa Romeo is heavily involved in various motorsports—including Grand Prix motor racing, Formula One, sportscar racing, touring car racing, and rallies—with achievements giving a sporty image to the marque. Enzo Ferrari founded the Scuderia Ferrari racing team in 1929 as an Alfa Romeo racing team, before forming his namesake luxury sports car maker in 1939.

== History ==
=== Name ===
The company's name is a combination of the original name, "A.L.F.A." ("Anonima Lombarda Fabbrica Automobili" - “Lombardian Automobile Factory Corporation”), and the last name of entrepreneur Nicola Romeo, who took control of the company in 1915.

=== Foundation and early years ===
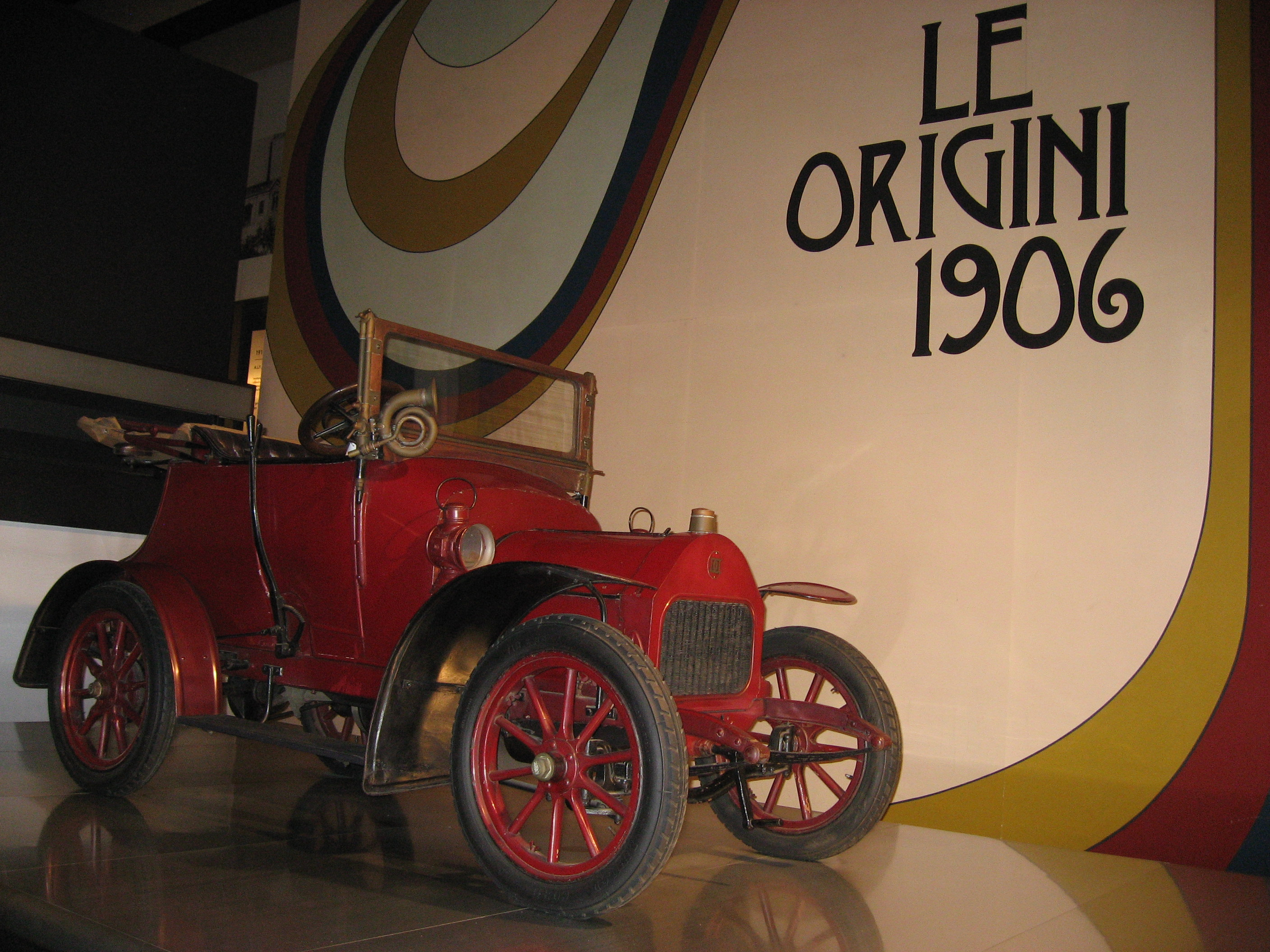
A 1908 Darracq 8/10 HP assembled by Alfa Romeo's predecessor, Darracq Italiana

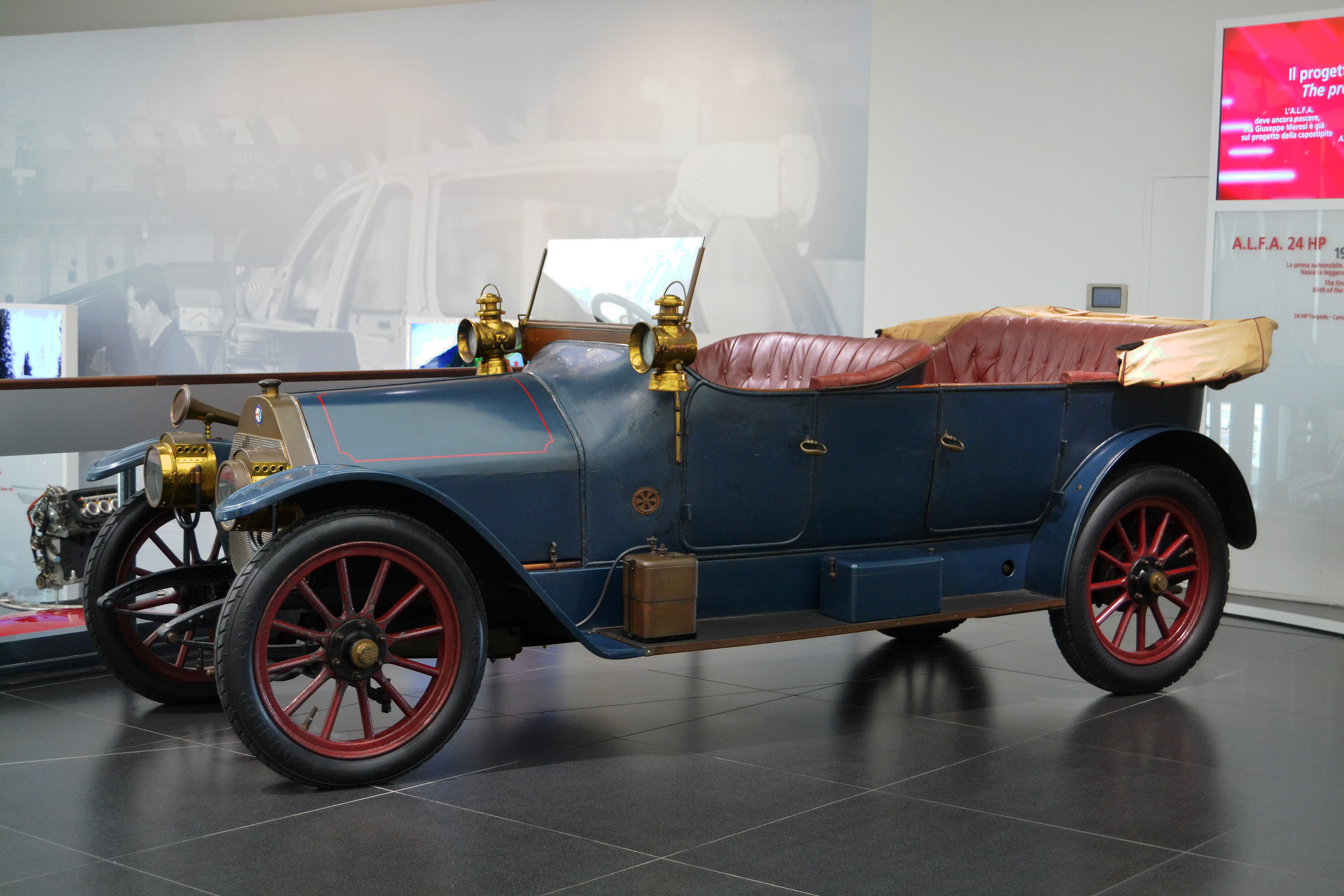
The A.L.F.A. 24 hp (this is with Castagna torpedo body) was the first car made by Anonima Lombarda Fabbrica Automobili (A.L.F.A.) in 1910.

The first factory building of A.L.F.A. was in the first-place property of Società Anonima Italiana Darracq (SAID), founded in 1906 by the French automobile firm of Alexandre Darracq, with some Italian investors. One of them, Cavaliere Ugo Stella, an aristocrat from Milan, became chairman of the SAID in 1909. The firm's initial location was in Naples, but even before the construction of the planned factory had started, Darracq decided late in 1906 that Milan would be more suitable and accordingly a tract of land was acquired in the Milan suburb of Portello, where a new factory of 6,700 square metres (8,000 sq yd) was constructed. In late 1909, the Italian Darracq cars were selling slowly and the company was wound up. Ugo Stella, with the other Italian co-investors, founded a new company named A.L.F.A. (Anonima Lombarda Fabbrica Automobili), buying the assets of Italian Darracq that was up to dissolution. The first car produced by the company was the 1910 24 HP, designed by Giuseppe Merosi, hired in 1909 for designing new cars more suited to the Italian market. Merosi would go on to design a series of new A.L.F.A. cars, with more powerful engines such as the 40–60 HP. A.L.F.A. ventured into motor racing, with drivers Franchini and Ronzoni competing in the 1911 Targa Florio with two 24-hp models. In 1914, an advanced Grand Prix car was designed and built, the GP1914, with a four-cylinder engine, double overhead camshafts, four valves per cylinder, and twin ignition. However, the onset of the First World War halted automobile production at A.L.F.A. for three years.

In August 1915, the company came under the direction of Neapolitan entrepreneur Nicola Romeo, who converted the factory to produce military hardware for the Italian and Allied war efforts. Munitions, aircraft engines and other components, compressors, and generators based on the company's existing car engines were produced in a vastly enlarged factory during the war. After the war, Romeo invested his war profits in acquiring locomotive and railway carriage plants in Saronno (Costruzioni Meccaniche di Saronno), Rome (Officine Meccaniche di Roma), and Naples (Officine Ferroviarie Meridionali), which were added to his A.L.F.A. ownership.

Alfa Romeo production between 1934 and 1939
Year	Cars	Industrial vehicles
1934	699	0
1935	91	211
1936	20	671
1937	270	851
1938	542	729
1939	372	562

Car production had not been considered at first, but resumed in 1919 since parts for the completion of 105 cars had remained at the A.L.F.A. factory since 1915. In 1920, the name of the company was changed to Alfa Romeo with the Torpedo 20–30 HP the first car to be so badged. Their first success came in 1920 when Giuseppe Campari won at Mugello and continued with second place in the Targa Florio driven by Enzo Ferrari. Giuseppe Merosi continued as head designer, and the company continued to produce solid road cars as well as successful race cars (including the 40–60 HP and the RL Targa Florio).

In 1923, Vittorio Jano was lured from Fiat, partly due to the persuasion of a young Alfa racing driver named Enzo Ferrari, to replace Merosi as chief designer at Alfa Romeo. The first Alfa Romeo under Jano was the P2 Grand Prix car, which won Alfa Romeo the inaugural world championship for Grand Prix cars in 1925. For road cars, Jano developed a series of small-to-medium-displacement 4-, 6-, and 8-cylinder inline engines based on the P2 unit that established the architecture of the company's engines, with light alloy construction, hemispherical combustion chambers, centrally located plugs, two rows of overhead valves per cylinder bank and dual overhead cams. Jano's designs proved both reliable and powerful.

Enzo Ferrari proved a better team manager than a driver, and when the factory team was privatised, it became Scuderia Ferrari. When Ferrari left Alfa Romeo, he went on to build his own cars. Tazio Nuvolari often drove for Alfa, winning many races before the Second World War.

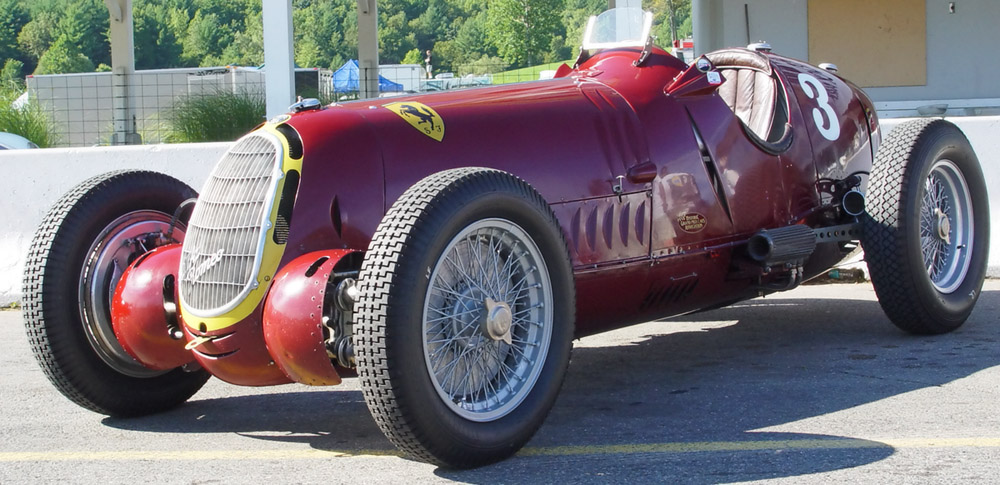
Alfa Romeo 8C 2900 Scuderia Ferrari

In 1928, Nicola Romeo left, and in 1933 Alfa Romeo was rescued by the government, which then had effective control. Alfa Romeo became an instrument of Mussolini's Italy, a national emblem. During this period, it built bespoke vehicles for the wealthy, with bodies normally by Carrozzeria Touring or Pininfarina. This era peaked with the Alfa Romeo 2900B Type 35 racers.

The Alfa factory (converted during wartime to the production of Macchi C.202 Folgore engines: the Daimler-Benz 600 series built under license) was bombed during the Second World War and struggled to return to profitability after the war. The luxury vehicles were out. Smaller, mass-produced vehicles began to be produced beginning with the 1954 model year, with the introduction of the Giulietta series of berline (saloons/sedans), coupes and open two-seaters. All three varieties shared what would become the Alfa Romeo overhead Twin Cam four-cylinder engine, initially displacing 1300 cc. This engine would eventually be enlarged to 2000 cc and would remain in production until 1995.

When I see an Alfa Romeo go by, I tip my hat.

— Henry Ford talking with Ugo Gobbato in 1939

=== Post-war ===
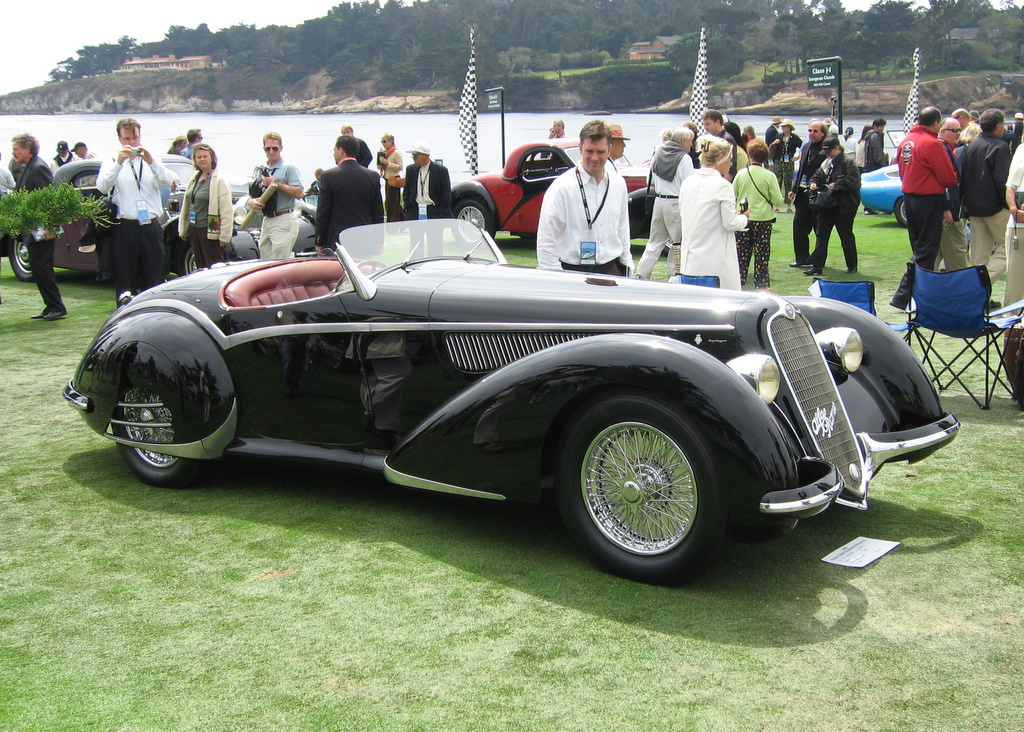
8C 2900B Touring Spider (1937)

Once motorsports resumed after the Second World War, Alfa Romeo proved to be the car to beat in Grand Prix events. The introduction of the new formula (Formula One) for single seat racing cars provided an ideal setting for Alfa Romeo's Tipo 158 Alfetta, adapted from a pre-war voiturette, and Giuseppe Farina won the first Formula One World Championship in 1950 in the 158. Juan Manuel Fangio secured Alfa's second consecutive championship in 1951.

In 1952, Alfa Romeo experimented with its first front-wheel-drive compact car, "Project 13–61". It had the same transverse-mounted, forward-motor layout as the modern front-wheel-drive automobile. Alfa Romeo made a second attempt in the late 1950s based on Project 13–61. It was to be called Tipo 103 and resembled the smaller version of its popular Alfa Romeo Giulia. However, due to the financial difficulties in post-war Italy, the Tipo 103 never saw production. Had Alfa Romeo produced it, it would have preceded the Mini as the first "modern" front-wheel-drive compact car. In the mid-1950s, Alfa Romeo entered into an agreement with Brazil's Matarazzo Group to create a company called Fabral (Fábrica Brasileira de Automóveis Alfa, "the Brazilian Alfa automobile factory") to build the Alfa Romeo 2000 there. After having received government approval, Matarazzo pulled out under pressure from Brazil's President Juscelino Kubitschek with the state-owned FNM company instead commenced building the car as the "FNM 2000" there in 1960.

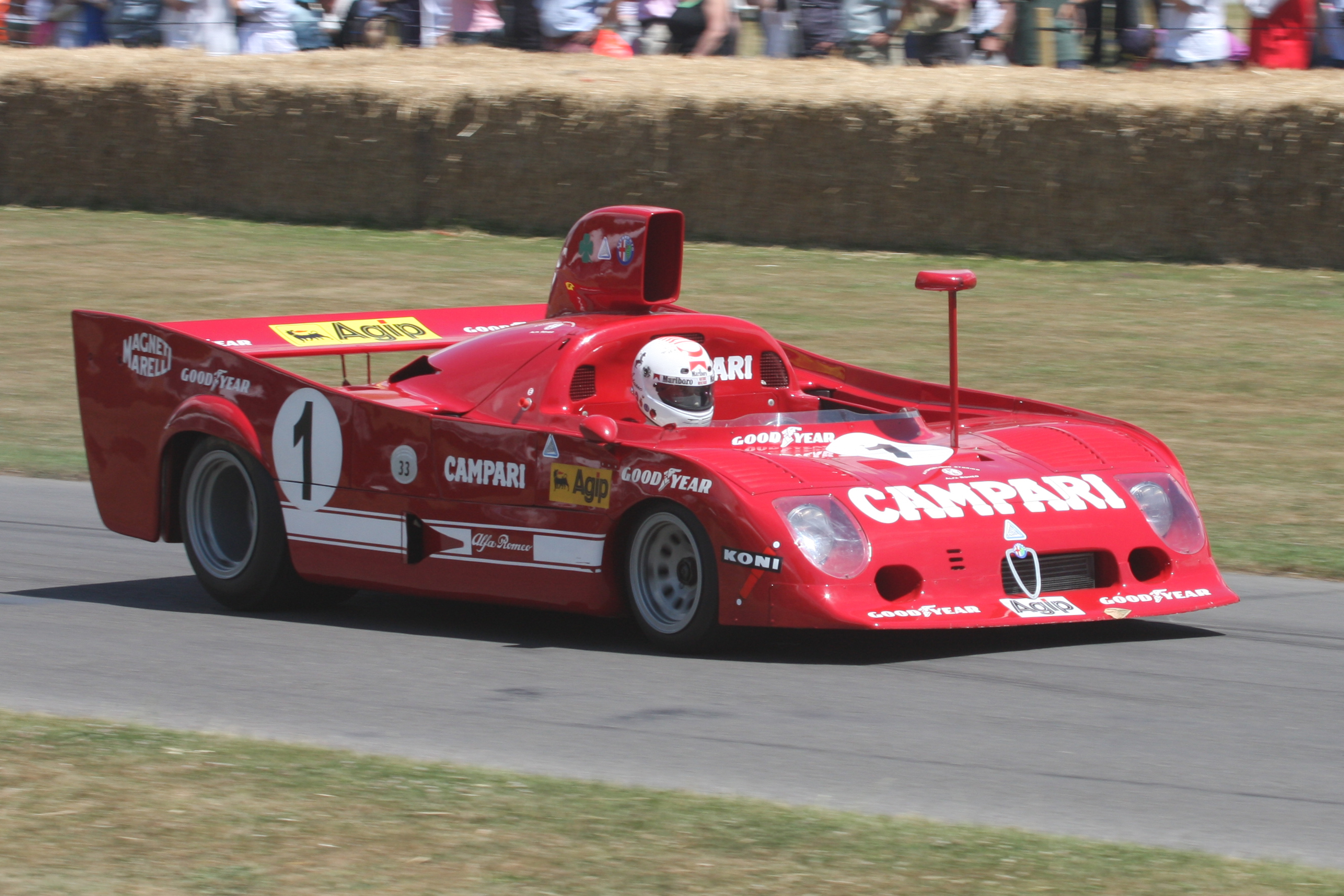
Alfa Romeo Tipo 33TT12

During the 1960s, Alfa Romeo concentrated on motorsports using production-based cars, including the GTA (standing for Gran Turismo Allegerita), an aluminium-bodied version of the Bertone-designed coupe with a powerful twin-plug engine. Among other victories, the GTA won the inaugural Sports Car Club of America's Trans-Am championship in 1966. In the 1970s, Alfa Romeo concentrated on prototype sports car racing with the Tipo 33, with early victories in 1971. Eventually the Tipo 33TT12 gained the World Championship for Makes for Alfa Romeo in 1975 and the Tipo 33SC12 won the World Championship for Sports Cars in 1977.

As Alfa Romeo was a state-controlled company, they were often subject to political pressure. To help industrialize Italy's underdeveloped south, Alfa Romeo's new compact car was to be built at a new factory at Pomigliano d'Arco in Campania. Even the car's name, Alfa Sud (Alfa South), reflected where it was built. 18 January 1968, saw a new company named "Industria Napoletana Costruzioni Autoveicoli Alfa Romeo-Alfasud S.p.A." being formed, 90% of which belonged to Alfa Romeo and 10% to Government controlled holding company Finmeccanica. This plant was built in the wake of France's 1968 protests and Italy's Hot Autumn and was never "properly started." The employees had mainly construction backgrounds and were not trained for factory work, while industrial relations were troublesome throughout. Absenteeism rates in the Pomigliano factory ran at 16.5 percent through the 1970s, reaching as high as 28 percent.

By the 1970s, Alfa Romeo was again in financial trouble, with the company running at about sixty percent of capacity in 1980. Since Alfa Romeo was controlled by the Italian government owned Istituto per la Ricostruzione Industriale (IRI), a deal was made where about a quarter of worker's salaries were paid through state unemployment agencies to allow Alfa's plants to idle for two weeks every two months. An aging product lineup and very low productivity combined with near-permanent industrial unrest and Italy's high inflation rates kept Alfa Romeo firmly in the red. Other creative measures were attempted to shore up Alfa, including an ultimately unsuccessful joint venture with Nissan endorsed by Alfa's then-president, Ettore Massacesi, and Prime Minister Francesco Cossiga. By 1986, IRI was suffering heavy losses—with Alfa Romeo having not been profitable for the last 13 years—and IRI president Romano Prodi put Alfa Romeo up for sale. Finmeccanica, the mechanical holdings arm of IRI and its predecessors owned Alfa Romeo since 1932. Prodi first approached fellow Italian manufacturer Fiat, which offered to start a joint venture with Alfa.

=== Fiat takeover ===
Fiat withdrew its plan for a joint venture with Alfa Romeo when Ford put in an offer to acquire part of Alfa Romeo and restructure the company, while increasing its stake over time. However, Fiat chose to put in a bid to acquire the entirety of Alfa Romeo and offer job guarantees to Italian workers, an offer that Ford was unwilling to match. It also did not hurt any of the parties involved that an acquisition by Fiat would keep Alfa Romeo in Italian hands. In 1986, the deal was concluded with Alfa Romeo merged with traditional rival Lancia into Fiat's Alfa Lancia Industriale S.p.A. Already in 1981, Alfa Romeo's then-President Ettore Massacesi had stated that Alfa would never use Fiat engines—the engines being, to a large extent, Alfa Romeo's identity—but would be happy to cooperate fully with everything else.

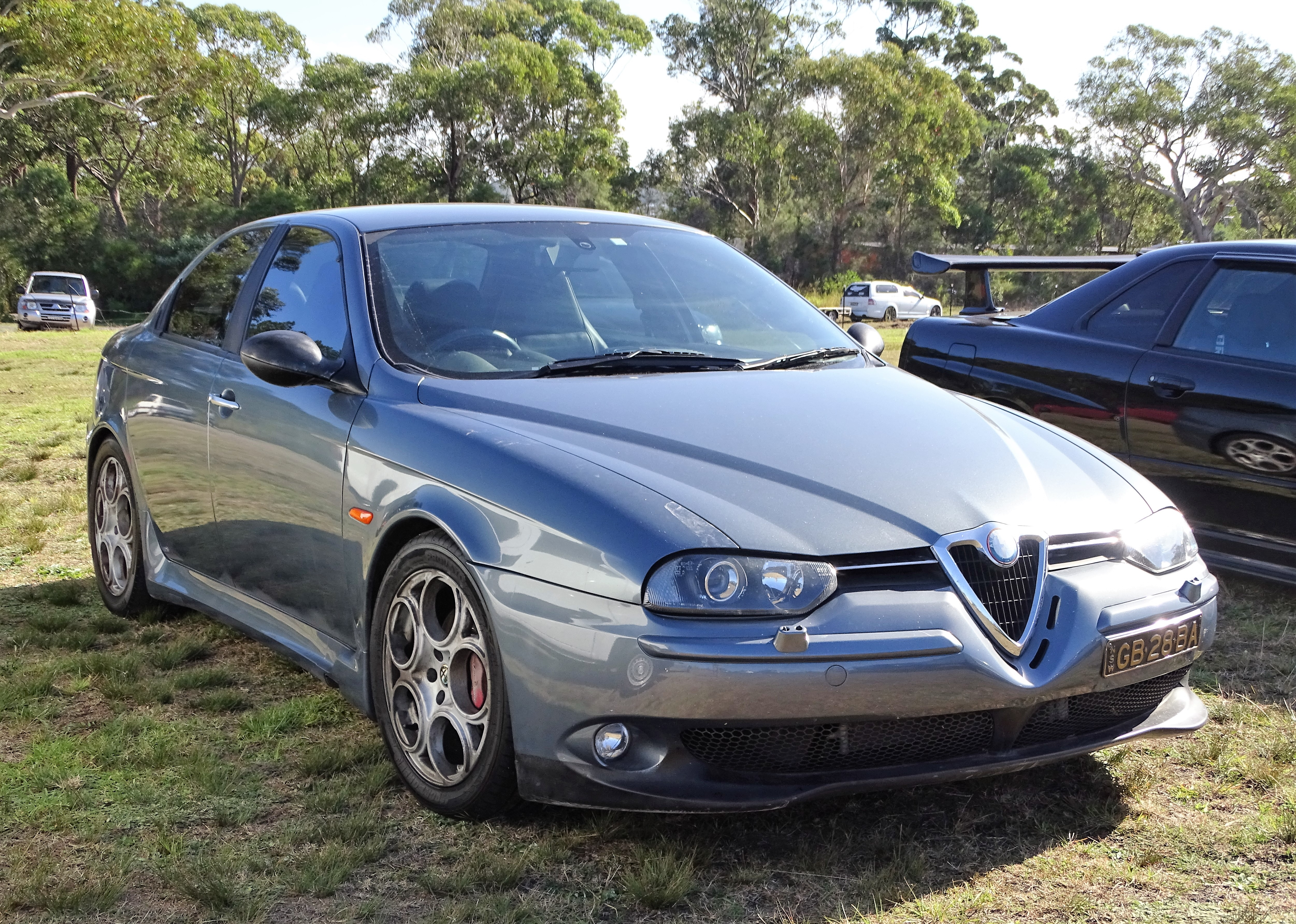
Alfa Romeo 156 GTA

Models produced from the 1990 onwards combined Alfa's traditional virtues of avant-garde styling and sporting panache with the economic benefits of product rationalisation, and include a "GTA" version of the 147 hatchback, the Giugiaro-designed Brera, and a high-performance exotic called the 8C Competizione (named after one of Alfa's most successful prewar sports and racing cars, the 8C of the 1930s).

In 2005, Maserati was bought back from Ferrari and was now under Fiat's full control. The Fiat Group then created a sports and luxury division from Maserati and Alfa Romeo. There is a planned strategic relationship between these two; engines, platforms and possibly dealers are shared.

In the beginning of 2007, Fiat Auto S.p.A. was reorganized and four new automobile companies were created; Fiat Automobiles S.p.A., Alfa Romeo Automobiles S.p.A., Lancia Automobiles S.p.A. and Fiat Light Commercial Vehicles S.p.A. These companies were fully owned by Fiat Group Automobiles S.p.A. (from 2007 FCA Italy S.p.A.).

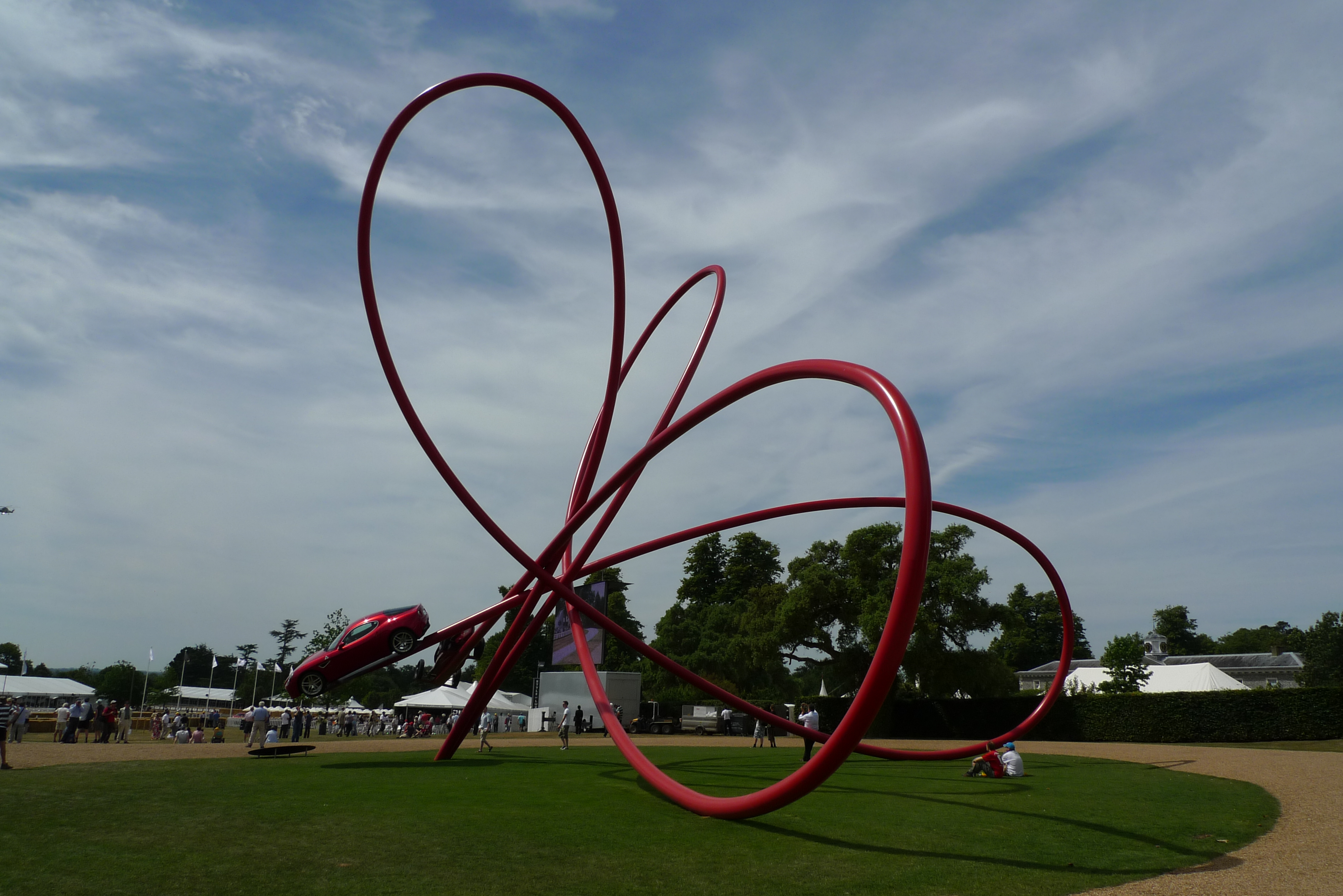
Sculpture commemorating 100 years of Alfa Romeo

On 24 June 2010, Alfa Romeo celebrated 100 years from its foundation.

Alfa Romeo production between 1998 and 2020
Year	Cars
1998	197,680
1999	208,336
2000	206,836
2001	213,638
2002	187,437
2003	182,469
2004	162,179
2005	130,815
2006	157,794
2007	151,898
2008	103,097
2009	103,687
2010	119,451
2011	130,535
2012	101,000
2013	74,000
2014	59,067
2015	57,351
2016	93,117
2017	150,722
2018	107,238
2019	72,657
2020	54,304
2021	44,115
2022	53,000
2023	69,600

=== Recent developments ===
Alfa Romeo has been suffering from falling sales. In 2010, it sold a total of about 112,000 units, which was significantly lower than Fiat CEO Marchionne's global sales target of 300,000. The company set about to achieve a sales target of 170,000 units in 2011, including 100,000 Giulietta and 60,000 MiTo models, but it actually sold 130,000 units that year. Its medium-term target was 500,000 units by 2014 including 85,000 from the North American market. In 2017 Alfa Romeo increased production by 62 percent, building a total of 150,722 vehicles at the company's three factories.

On 16 January 2021, the operations of Fiat Chrysler Automobiles and Groupe PSA were merged to form Stellantis and the company was renamed Stellantis Italy.

In spite of falling sales, Alfa Romeo CEO Jean-Philippe Imparato announced in 2021 that a new model would be launched every year between 2022 and 2026, starting with the much-delayed Tonale, with full electrification of new models from 2027.

=== Return to North America ===
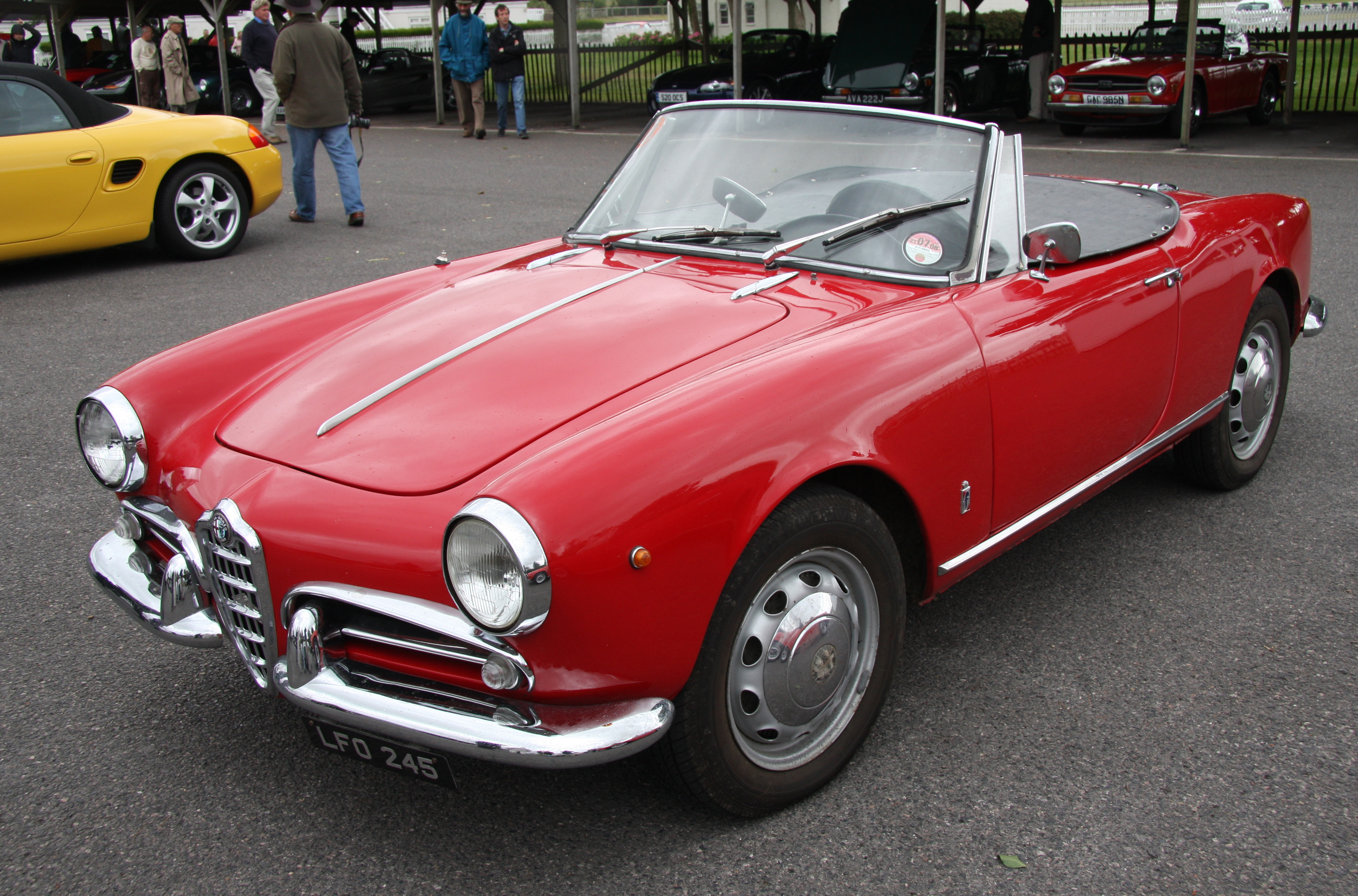
Giulietta Spider

Alfa Romeo was imported to the United States by Max Hoffman from the mid-1950s. The Giulietta Spider was developed on the request of Max Hoffman, who proposed an open top version of the Giulietta. In 1961 Alfa Romeo started exporting cars to the United States through its own dealer network.

In 1995, Alfa Romeo ceased exporting cars to the United States, the last model sold in that market being the 164 sedan.

On 5 May 2006, Alfa Romeo made its return to the US Market as announced by Fiat CEO Sergio Marchionne after a series of rumours. North American sales resumed in October 2008, with the launch of the limited production 8C Competizione coupe with Alfa Romeo models being imported by Fiat's US subsidiary Chrysler. Also in 2008, Alfa Romeo and Chrysler were reported to be in discussions over the possibility of producing Alfa Romeo cars in some Chrysler manufacturing plants that had shut down due to the company group's restructure and cost cutting. Instead, as reported by The Wall Street Journal in November 2009, Chrysler discontinued several Dodge and Jeep models while phasing in Alfa Romeo ones and the new Fiat 500.

The next significant milestones in Alfa Romeo's North American return occurred in 2014, with the launch of the more affordable two-seater 4C coupe. That year, Fiat Group Automobiles S.p.A. confirmed that its original agreement with Mazda Motor Corporation, for the speculated manufacturing of a new Alfa Romeo Spider based on the Mazda MX-5 had been terminated mutually in December 2014. The proposed model for this joint venture became the Fiat 124 Spider convertible launched in 2015. In 2015, Alfa Romeo's return to this market was further bolstered by the automaker's display of the new Giulia at the Los Angeles Auto Show. In February 2017, Chrysler featured its Alfa Romeo brand exclusively in three ads during Super Bowl LI.

Alfa Romeo's US importer, FCA US LLC, currently imports the Giulia, Stelvio, Tonale and 33 Stradale.

== Leadership ==
- Nicola Romeo (1915–1928)
- Ugo Gobbato (1933–1945)
- Pasquale Gallo (1945–1948)
- Giuseppe Luraghi (1951–1974)
- Ermanno Guani (1974)
- Gaetano Cortesi (1974–1978)
- Ettore Massacesi (1978–1986)
- Danielle Bandiera (2002–2005)
- Antonio Baravalle (2005–2007)
- Sergio Cravero (2009–2010)
- Harald Wester (2010–2016)
- Reid Bigland (2016–2018)
- Timothy Kuniskis (2018–2021)
- Jean-Philippe Imparato (2021–2024)
- Santo Ficilli (2024–present)

== Design and technology ==
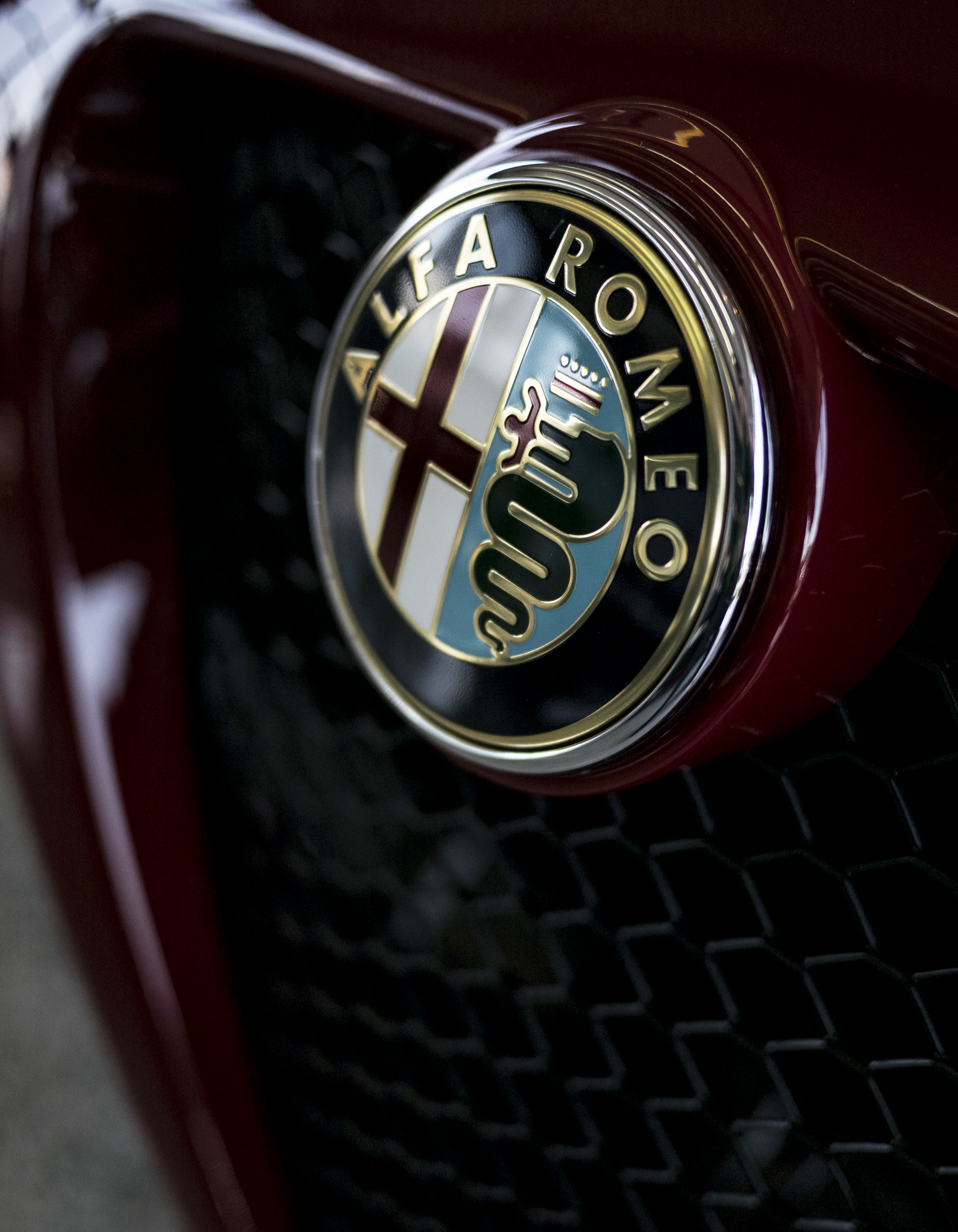
Badge on an Alfa Romeo 4C

=== Technological development ===
Alfa Romeo has introduced many technological innovations over the years, and the company has often been among the first users of new technologies. Its trademark double overhead cam engine was used for the first time in the 1914 Grand Prix car, the first road car with such an engine, the 6C 1500 Sport, appeared in 1928.

Alfa Romeo tested one of the first electronic fuel injection systems (Caproni-Fuscaldo) in the Alfa Romeo 6C 2500 with "Ala spessa" body in 1940 Mille Miglia. The engine had six electrically operated injectors, fed by a semi-high pressure circulating fuel pump system.

1969 models for the North American market had SPICA (Società Pompe Iniezione Cassani & Affini, a subsidiary of Alfa Romeo) mechanical fuel injection. According to Alfa Romeo, the engine's power output and performance were unchanged from the carburetted version. The SPICA system continued until the 1982 model year with the introduction of 2.0 liter Bosch electronic fuel injection.

Mechanical variable valve timing was introduced in the Alfa Romeo Spider, sold in the U.S. in 1980. All Alfa Romeo Spider models from 1983 onward used electronic VVT.

The 105 series Giulia was quite an advanced car, using technologies such as all-wheel disc brakes, and a plastic radiator header tank. It had also the lowest drag coefficient (Cd) in its class The same trend continued with the Alfetta 2000 and GTV, which had quirks such as 50:50 weight distribution, standard fit alloy wheels and transaxle.

Newer innovations include complete CAD design process used in designing the Alfa Romeo 164 and an automated/paddle-shift transmission called Selespeed used in the 156; the 156 was also the world's first passenger car to use Common rail diesel engine. The Multiair -an electro-hydraulic variable valve actuation technology used in MiTo was introduced in 2009. In 2016, the Alfa Romeo Giulia came with electrical brakes.

=== Body design ===
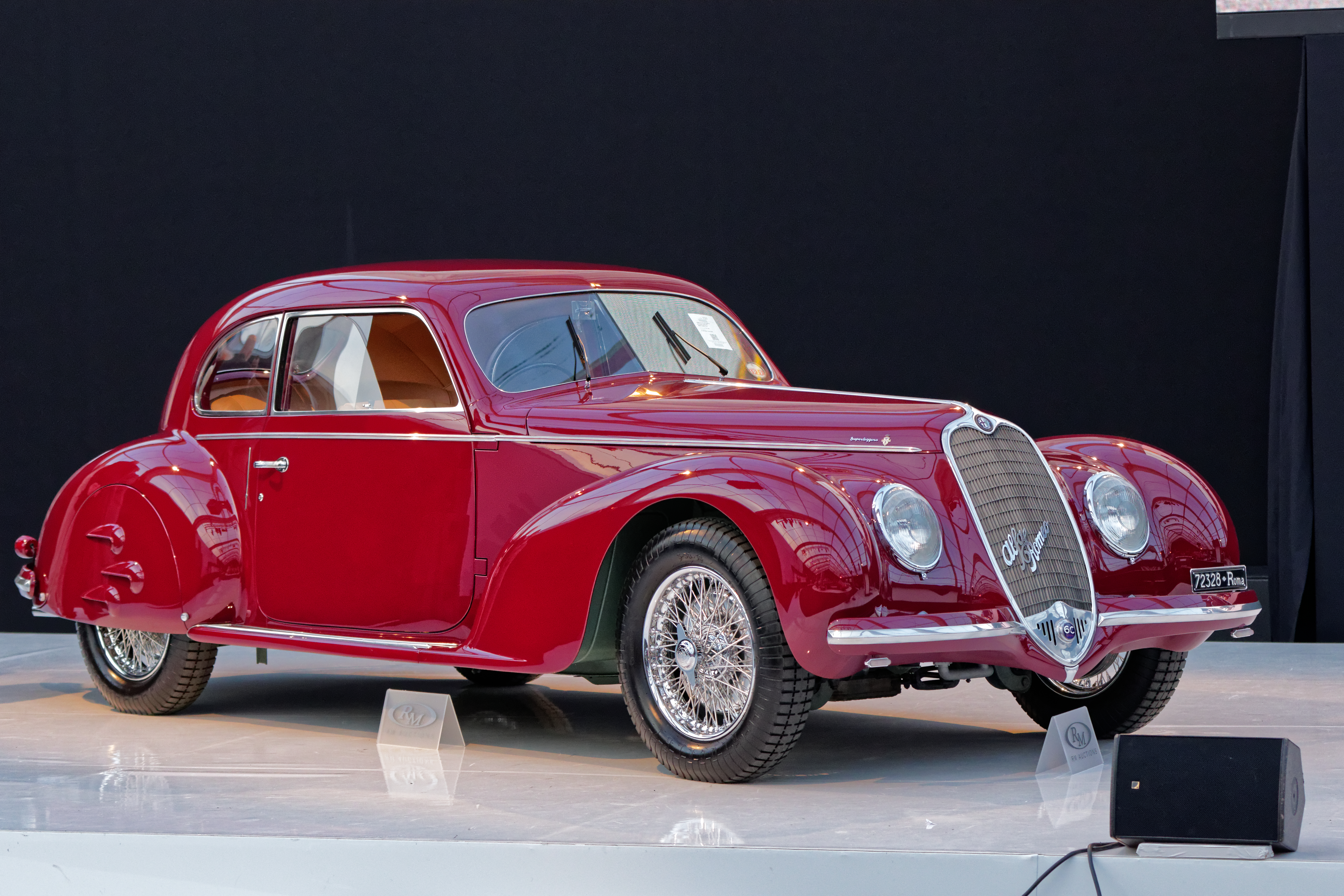
1939 Alfa Romeo 6C 2500 Sport Berlinetta by Touring Superleggera

Many famous automotive design houses in Italy have accepted commissions to produce concepts and production vehicle shapes for Alfa Romeo. These include:

- Bertone
- Giorgetto Giugiaro / Italdesign
- Pininfarina
- Touring Superleggera
- Zagato
- Centro Stile Alfa Romeo

Construction techniques used by Alfa Romeo has been imitated by other carmakers, and in this way, the Alfa Romeo body designs have often been very influential. The following is a list of innovations, and where appropriate, examples of imitation by other car manufacturers:

- 1960s: Aerodynamics: The 116-series Giulia had a very low Cd. Toyota, in particular, sought to produce a similarly shaped series of vehicles at this time.
- 1970s: Fairing of bumpers: In order to meet American crash standards, Alfa Romeo formulated a design technique to incorporate bumpers into the overall bodywork design of vehicles so as to not ruin their design lines. The culmination of this design technique was the 1980s Alfa Romeo 75. The process was widely copied, particularly in Germany and Japan.
- 1980s: Design process: Model 164 manufacturing introduced complete CAD/CAM, with very little directly made by hand. Its influence is out of proportion to previous models. Its styling continues to influence today's models. Most manufacturers incorporated design ideas first expressed in the 164, including greater reliance on on-board computers.
- 1990s: Pseudo-coupé: Model 156 and 147, while four-door vehicles, represented themselves as two-doors with prominent front door handles, and less visible rear door-handle flaps. Honda used this style in its latest Civic hatchback, and a similar idea is also seen in the Mazda RX-8 four-seat coupé and Renault Clio V.
- 2000s: The Brera and 159: These vehicles' design, by Giorgetto Giugiaro, have proven influential in sedan and coupé styling, demonstrating that concept vehicles are often immediately translatable into road car form, providing that initial design takes place using CAD systems.

=== Concept cars ===
Several concept cars have been made by Alfa Romeo:

1950s – The B.A.T. cars

The Berlina Aerodinamica Tecnica prototype cars were designed by Bertone as an exercise in determining whether streamlining and wind-tunnel driven designs would result in high performance on a standard chassis and whether the resulting vehicles would be palatable to the public. Alfa 1900 Sprint were the basis of the B.A.T. 5, 7 and 9. The later B.A.T. 11 was based on the 8C Competizione.

1960s and 1970s – Descendants of the Tipo 33

The Tipo 33 racing car, with its high-revving 2000 cc V8 engine became the basis for a number of different concept cars during the 1960s and 1970s, two of which ultimately resulted in production vehicles. Most made their appearances at the Auto Salon Genève. Here is a brief list:

- Gandini/Bertone Carabo (1968) – Marcello Gandini expressed ideas that would come to fruition in the Lamborghini Countach.
- Tipo 33.2 (1969) – Designed by Pininfarina using a design already known from a Ferrari concept car.
- Gandini/Bertone Montreal Concept (1967) – making its appearance at the 1967 Montreal Expo, this Giulia-based concept resulted in the production Alfa Romeo Montreal road car with a variant of the Tipo 33's V8 engine.
- Bertone/Giugiaro Navajo (1976) – A fully fibreglassed vehicle, and in some ways the epitome of Giugiaro's 'Origami' style of flat planes.

1980s-today – Modern ideas

In general, concept cars for Alfa Romeo have generally become production vehicles, after some modification to make them suitable for manufacture, and to provide driver and passenger safety. The Zagato SZ, GTV, and Spider, Brera, and 159 are all good examples of Alfa Romeo's stylistic commitment in this direction.

== Logos ==
=== Original logo ===
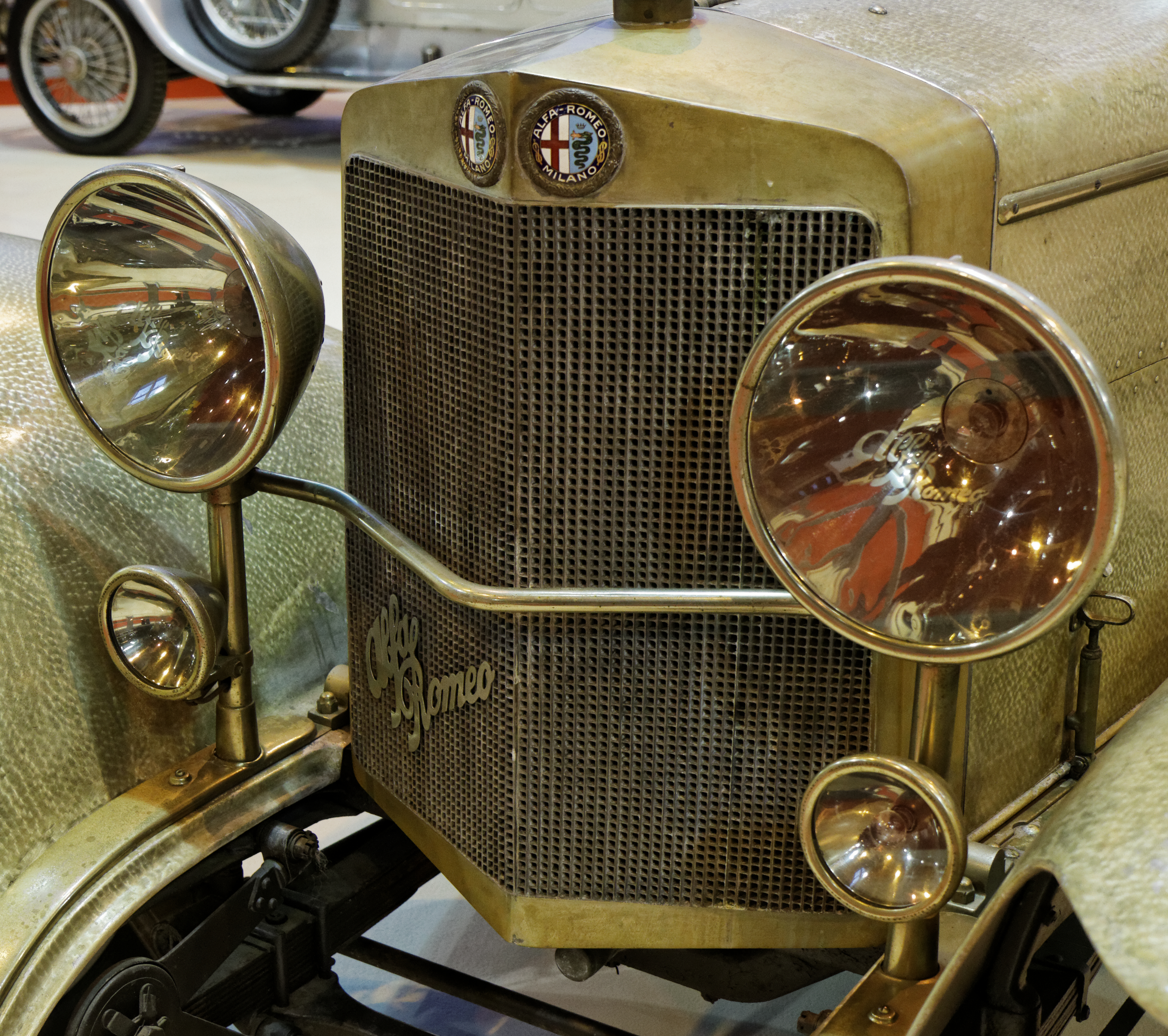
Laurel-wreathed 1925–1945 badges on a 1925 Alfa Romeo RL SS

Alfa Romeo's logo incorporates two heraldic devices traditionally associated with its birthplace, the city of Milan: A red cross, from the emblem of Milan, and the biscione, a big grass snake and a child emerging from its mouth—emblem of the House of Visconti, rulers of the city in the 14th century.

The logo was originally designed in 1910 by a young Italian draughtsman from the A.L.F.A. technical office, Romano Cattaneo.

==== Origin ====
In June 1910, the Società Anonima Darracq became Anonima Lombarda Fabbrica Automobili, and was readying its first model, the 24 HP. The board asked chief engineer Giuseppe Merosi to devise a badge for the radiator shell of the new car; Merosi turned to his collaborators. One of them, Cattaneo, was inspired by the coat of arms he had seen on the gates of Castello Sforzesco to include the biscione in the logo. Merosi liked the idea, and together with Cattaneo came up with a sketch, then approved by managing director Ugo Stella; Cattaneo was entrusted with doing the final design.

The original badge was round, of enamelled brass, measuring 65 mm (2.6 in) in diameter, and carried already all the present day accoutrements: the red cross on a white field of Milan on the left, a green biscione on a light blue field on the right, all surrounded by a blue ring inscribed with the words "ALFA" at the top and "MILANO" at the bottom. In honour of the King of Italy, the two words were separated by two figure-eight knots—named Savoy knots in Italian, and symbols of the then-reigning House of Savoy. Originally solid brass, the lettering was changed to white enamel in 1913. In 1918, after the company had been bought by Nicola Romeo, the wording "ALFA" was replaced with "ALFA-ROMEO".

In 1925, to commemorate the victory of the Alfa Romeo P2 in the inaugural World Manufacturers' Championship of 1925, a silver metal laurel wreath was added around the badge, used (in varying form) until 1982. The addition of the wreath had enlarged the badge to 75 mm (3.0 in) diameter; in 1930 it was reduced back to 60 mm (2.4 in).

==== Post-war evolution ====
In 1946, after the abolition of the monarchy and proclamation of the Italian Republic, the figure-eight knots of the Savoy were replaced with two curvy lines. Concurrently the badge was completely redesigned, and further reduced in size to 54 mm (2.1 in), a diameter unchanged ever since. Made of stamped steel, the new badge bore the traditional elements—the scripts, the cross, a newly stylized biscione and a thin laurel wreath—embossed in antique silver, over a uniform Alfa Red background, which had replaced the blue, white and light blue fields. This red-and-metal badge was used until 1950, when the company switched back to a traditionally enamelled and coloured one; in 1960 the badge was changed from brass to plastic, without substantial differences in design.

At the beginning of the 1970s the all-new Alfa Romeo Pomigliano d'Arco plant (near Naples) was completed. When in 1972 the Alfasud produced there became the first Alfa Romeo passenger car manufactured outside Milan, the word "Milano", the curved lines and the hyphen between "Alfa" and "Romeo" were eliminated from the badge on all Alfa Romeos. At the same time it was redesigned, most notably acquiring a modernised biscione and typeface.

After a mild restyling in 1982, which deleted the wreath and changed lettering and all chrome details to gold, this iteration of the badge remained in use until 2015.

==== 2015 redesign ====
On 24 June 2015, 105th anniversary of the company, a new logo was unveiled at a press event at the Alfa Romeo Museum; together with the Alfa Romeo Giulia as part of the brand's relaunch plan. The redesign was carried out by Robilant Associati, who had previously reworked several other Fiat Group logos—including Fiat Automobiles' and Lancia's.

The logo colors have been reduced from four to three: the green of the biscione, the red of the cross, and the dark blue of the surrounding ring. Other changes are a new serif type face, and the absence of the split white and light blue fields, replaced by a single silver textured background.

=== The Quadrifoglio logo ===
Since 1923, the quadrifoglio logo (also called the 'cloverleaf') has been the symbol of Alfa Romeo racing cars and since WWII, it has also been used to designate the higher trim models of the range. The quadrifoglio is usually placed on the side panels of the car, above or behind the front wheels—on the front wings in the case of modern vehicles. The logo consists of a green (or in some cases golden) cloverleaf with four leaves, contained with a white triangle.

==== History of the emblem ====
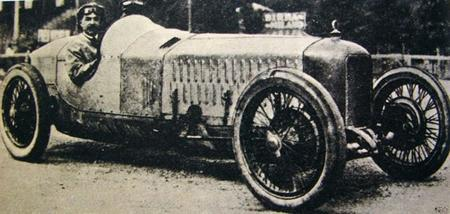
Ugo Sivocci at the wheel of a 1923 Alfa Romeo P1

The quadrifoglio has been used on Alfa Romeo cars since the death of Ugo Sivocci in 1923. As a friend of Enzo Ferrari, Sivocci was hired by Alfa Romeo in 1920 to drive in the four-man works team—Alfa Corse—with Antonio Ascari, Giuseppe Campari, and Enzo Ferrari. Sivocci was thought to have enormous experience, but often hampered by bad luck and considered the eternal second-placer. To banish his bad luck, when the Targa Florio came around, the driver painted a white square with a green four-leaf clover (the quadrifoglio) in the centre of the grille of his car. Sivocci had immediate success, crossing the finish line first. The quadrifoglio subsequently became the symbol of the racing Alfa Romeos with the victory at the Targa Florio. Almost as if to prove the magic effects of this symbol, Sivocci was killed while testing Merosi's new P1 at Monza, a few months after winning the Targa Florio. The Salerno driver's P1, which went off the track on a bend, did not have the quadrifoglio. Since this period in 1923, the bodies of Alfa Romeo racing cars have been adorned with the quadrifoglio as a lucky charm. The white square was replaced with a triangle in memory of Ugo Sivocci.

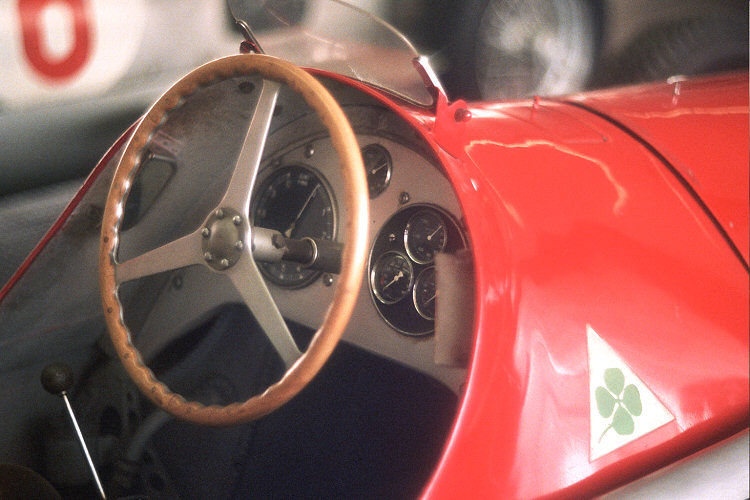
Quadrifoglio badge on the Alfetta 159

==== Modern usage ====
The first road car to bear the quadrifoglio was the 1963 Alfa Romeo Giulia TI Super, a variant of the Giulia saloon car devised for competition but put regularly on sale; it had green four-leaf clovers on its front wings, without the triangle. In the 1970s "Quadrifoglio Verde" or "Green Cloverleaf" became the trim level for each model's sportiest variant, equipped with the most powerful engine. The Alfasud, Sprint, 33, 75, 164 and 145 all had Quadrifoglio Verde versions. Also in the 1970s and through the 1980s golden four-leaf clover badges were used to denote the most luxurious and well-equipped variants of Alfa Romeo cars, named "Quadrifoglio Oro" or "Gold Cloverleaf". The Alfasud, Alfetta, Alfa 6, 90 and 33 had Quadrifoglio Oro versions. In recent times the quadrifoglio was revived on the 2007 Alfa Romeo 8C Competizione and Spider sports cars. With the Alfa Romeo MiTo and Giulietta, the Quadrifoglio Verde was reinstated as the sportiest trim level in the range, and green four-leaf clovers on the front wings are once again the hallmark of high-performance Alfa Romeos. Alfa Romeo's 2016 sport sedan, the all-new Giulia, was launched first in Quadrifoglio trim before the release of the base models.

== Motorsport ==
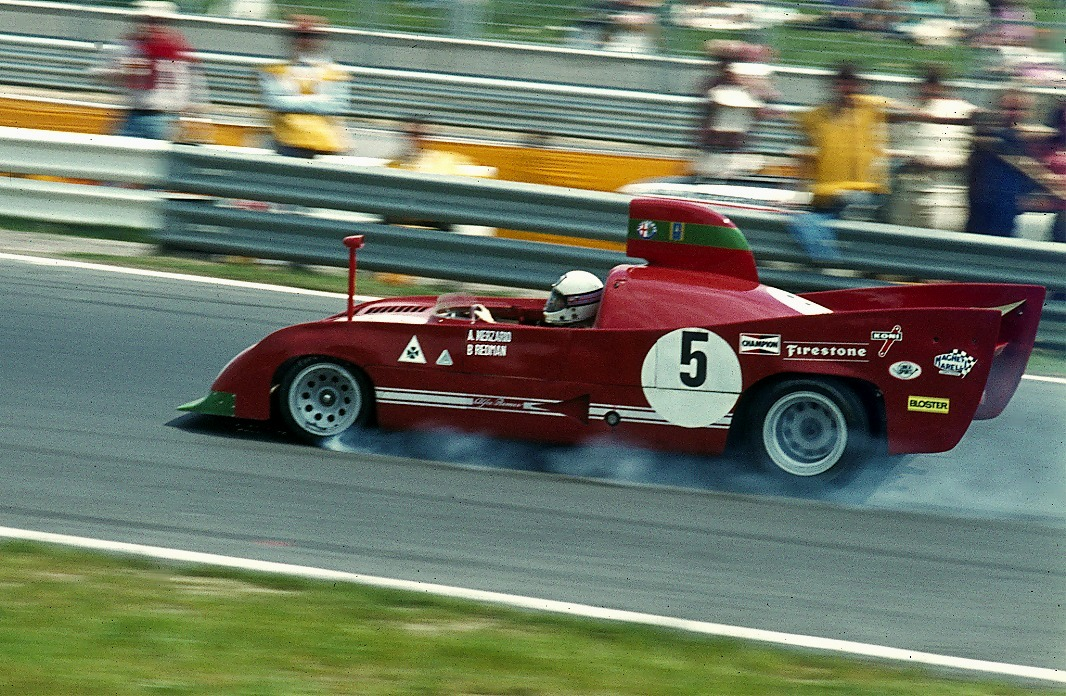
Brian Redman driving an Alfa Romeo 33 TT 12

Alfa Romeo has been involved with motor racing since 1911, when it entered two 24 HP models in Targa Florio competition. Alfa Romeo won the first World Manufacturers' Championship in 1925 and the first AIACR European Championship in 1931 and it scored wins at many races and motoring events such as Targa Florio, Mille Miglia and Le Mans. Great success continued with Formula One, when Alfa Romeo won the first World Formula One Championship in 1950 and won the second Formula One Championship in 1951. The company also won international championships in Prototypes, Touring and Fast Touring categories in the 1960s and 1970s. Private drivers also entered some rally competitions, with good results. Alfa Romeo has competed both as a constructor and an engine supplier, via works entries Alfa Corse, Autodelta and private entries. Alfa Romeo's factory racing team was outsourced to Enzo Ferrari's Scuderia Ferrari between 1933 and 1938. Drivers included Tazio Nuvolari, who won the 1935 German Grand Prix at the Nürburgring.

Alfa Romeo have been in a technical partnership with the Sauber F1 Team since 2018. In February 2019, Sauber announced that it would compete as Alfa Romeo Racing although the ownership, racing licence and management structure would remain unchanged. Alfa Romeo ended their partnership with Sauber and left Formula One after the 2023 season.

Alfa Romeo has won five FIA European Formula 3 Championships and five FIA European Formula 3 Cups with the support from the Alfa Romeo stable Euroracing, who created the motor for the Formula 3 championship and with the support of Italian motor company Novamotor which work in the Formula 3 competition.

== Production ==
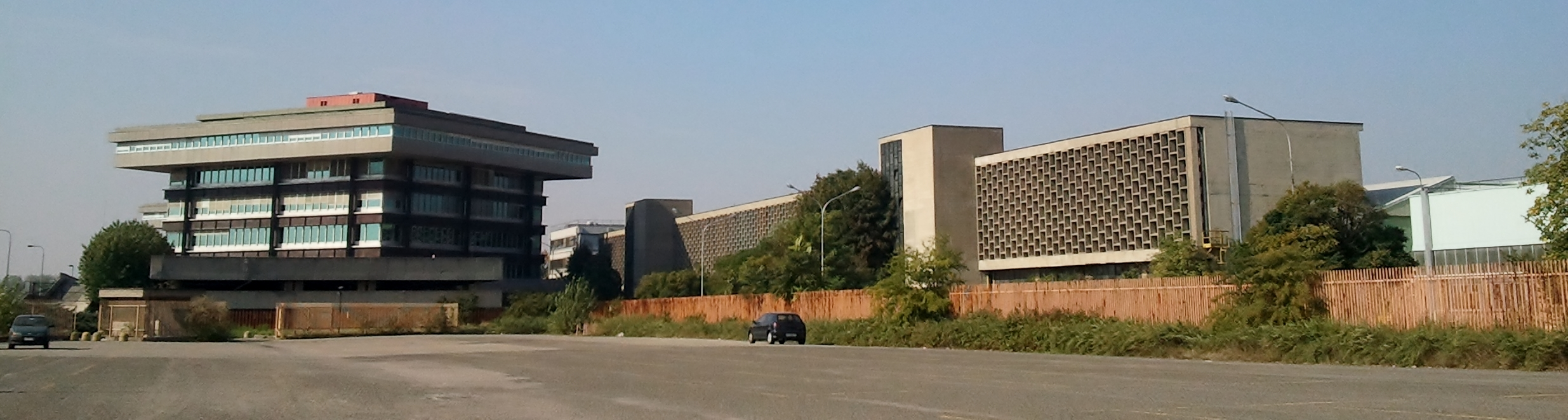
Alfa Romeo's plant in Arese

In the 1960s, the main Alfa Romeo factory was moved from inside Milan to a very large and nearby area extending over the municipalities of Arese, Lainate and Garbagnate Milanese. However, since then the factory was moved to Arese, as the offices and the main entrance of the area were located there.

In the late 1960s, a number of European automobile manufacturers established facilities in South Africa to assemble right hand drive vehicles. Fiat and other Italian manufacturers established factories along with these other manufacturers, Alfa-Romeos were assembled in Brits, outside Pretoria in the Transvaal Province of South Africa. With the imposition of sanctions by Western powers in the 1970s and 1980s, South Africa became self-sufficient, and in car production came to rely more and more on the products from local factories. This led to a set of circumstances where between 1972 and 1989, South Africa had the greatest number of Alfa Romeos on the road outside of Italy. The Alfa Romeos Brits plant was used from March 1983 until late 1985 to build Daihatsu Charades for local consumption, but also for export to Italy in order to skirt Italian limits on Japanese imports. For the last year the company was operating, the Daihatsu represented close to half of Alfa Romeo S.A. Ltd.'s total production.

In late 1985, with the impending Fiat takeover and an international boycott of the South African Apartheid government, Alfa Romeo withdrew from the market and closed the plant.

During the 1990s, Alfa Romeo moved car production to other districts in Italy. The Pomigliano d’Arco plant produced the 155, followed by the 145 and the 146, while the Arese plant manufactured the SZ and RZ sports cars, the 164, the new Spider and the GTV. The 156 was launched in 1997 and in 1998 was voted "Car of the Year". The same year a new flagship, the 166 (assembled in Rivalta, near Turin) was launched. At the beginning of the third millennium, the 147 was released, which won the title of "European Car of the Year 2001". In 2003 the Arese factory was closed while only having some offices and the Alfa Romeo Historical Museum.

Assembly plants by model
Plant	Owner	Location	Model(s)
Cassino	Stellantis	Piedimonte San Germano, Italy	Giulia, Stelvio
Pomigliano	Stellantis	Pomigliano d'Arco, Italy	Tonale
Tychy	Stellantis	Tychy, Poland	Junior

== Automobiles ==
=== Current models ===
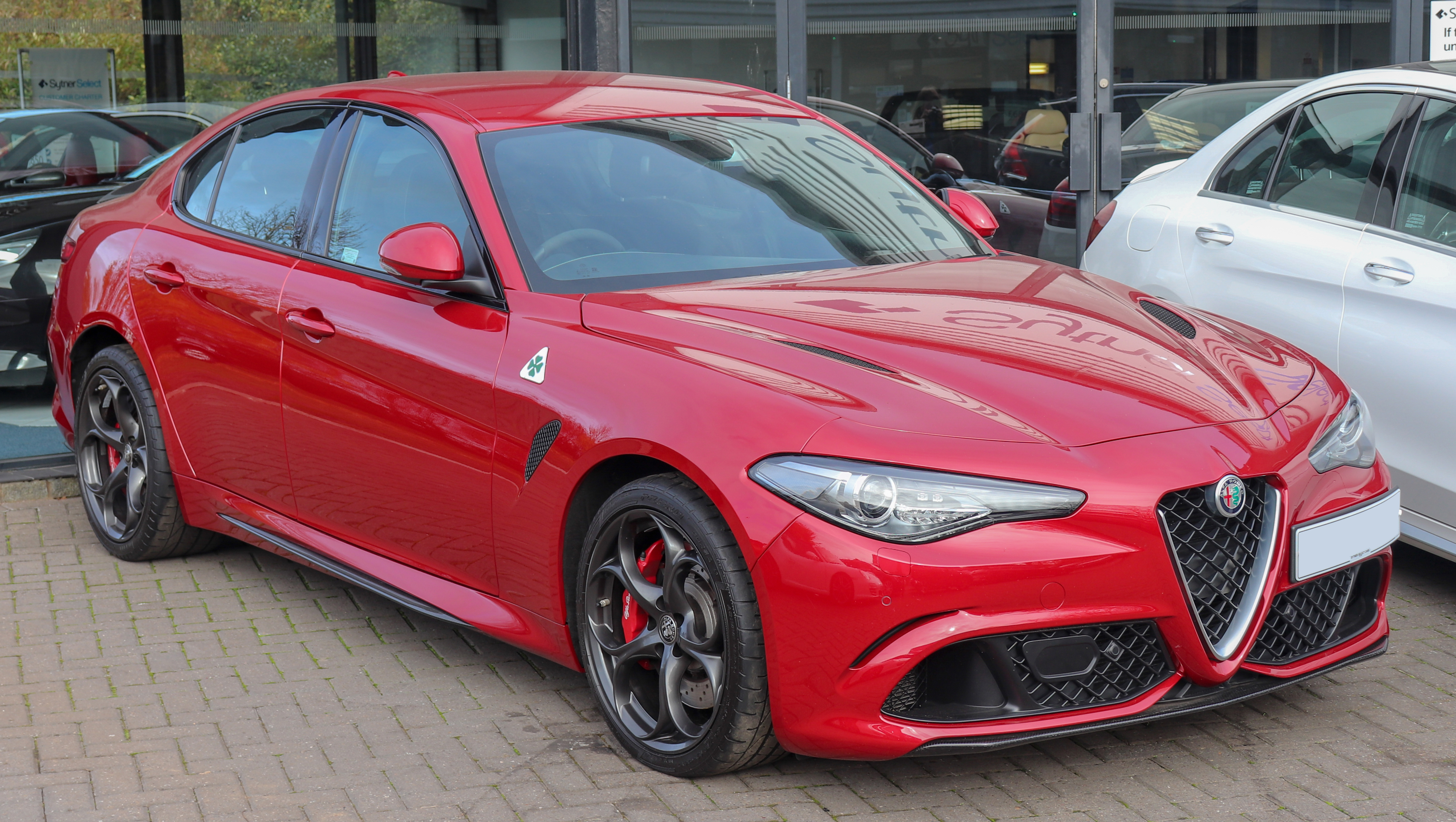
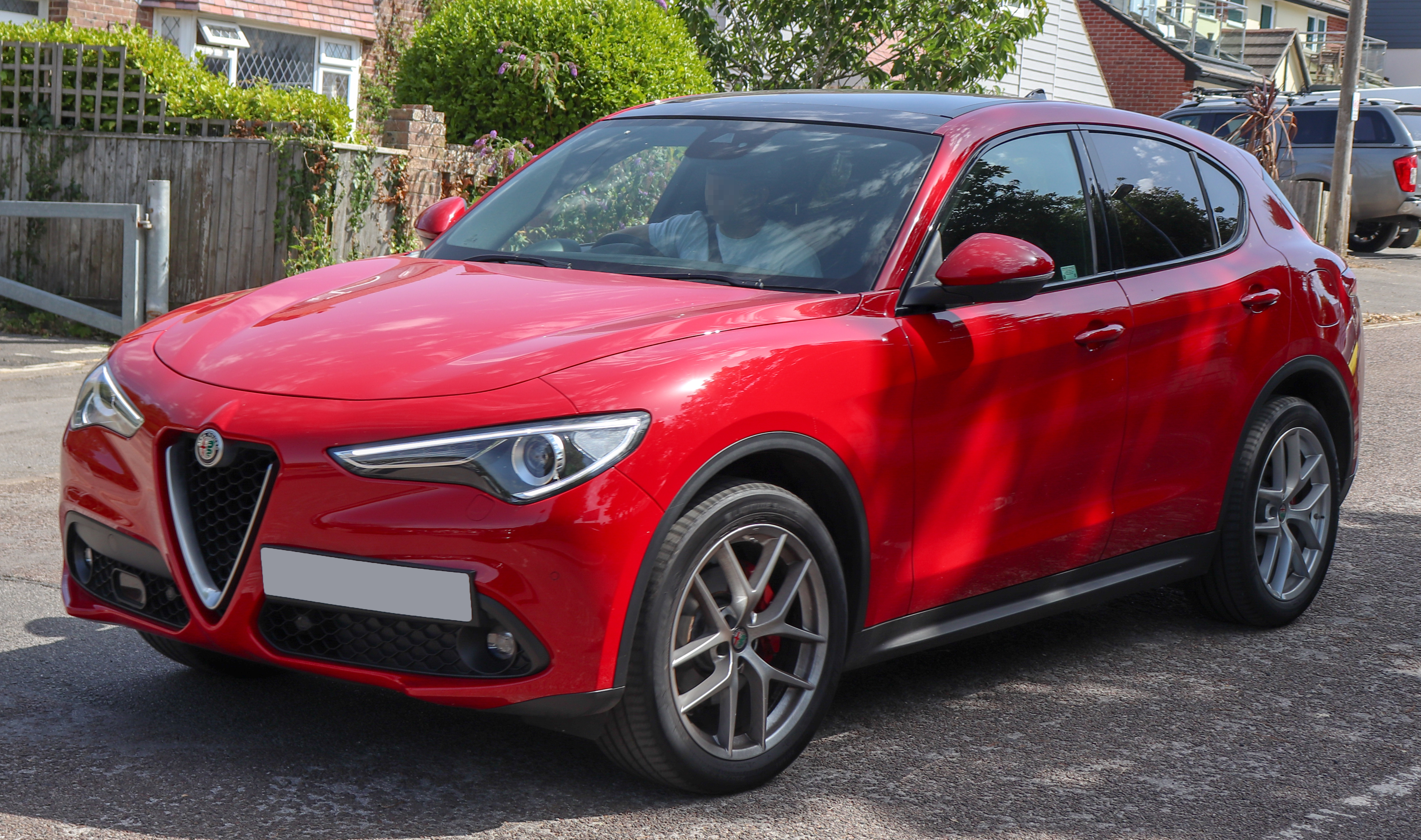
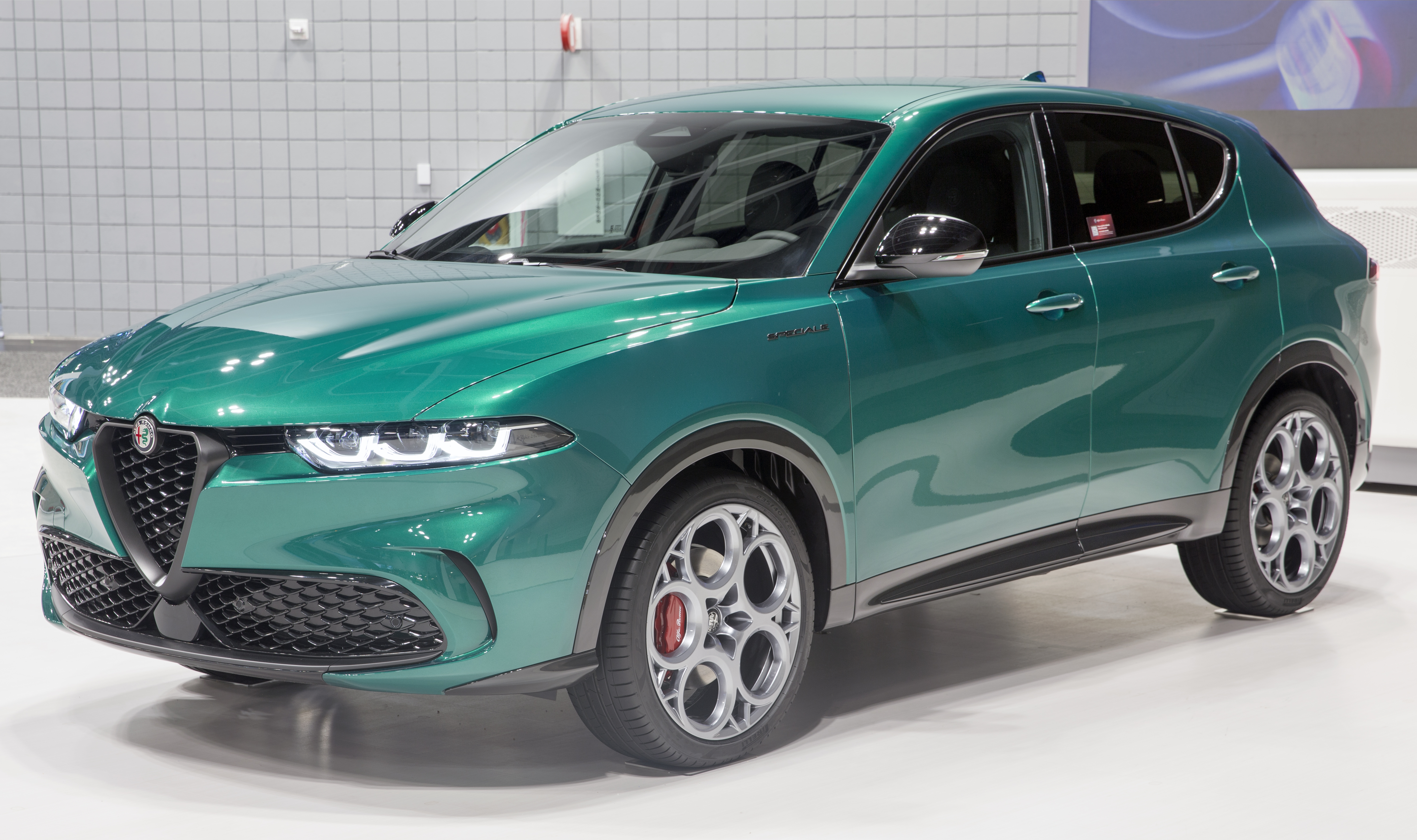
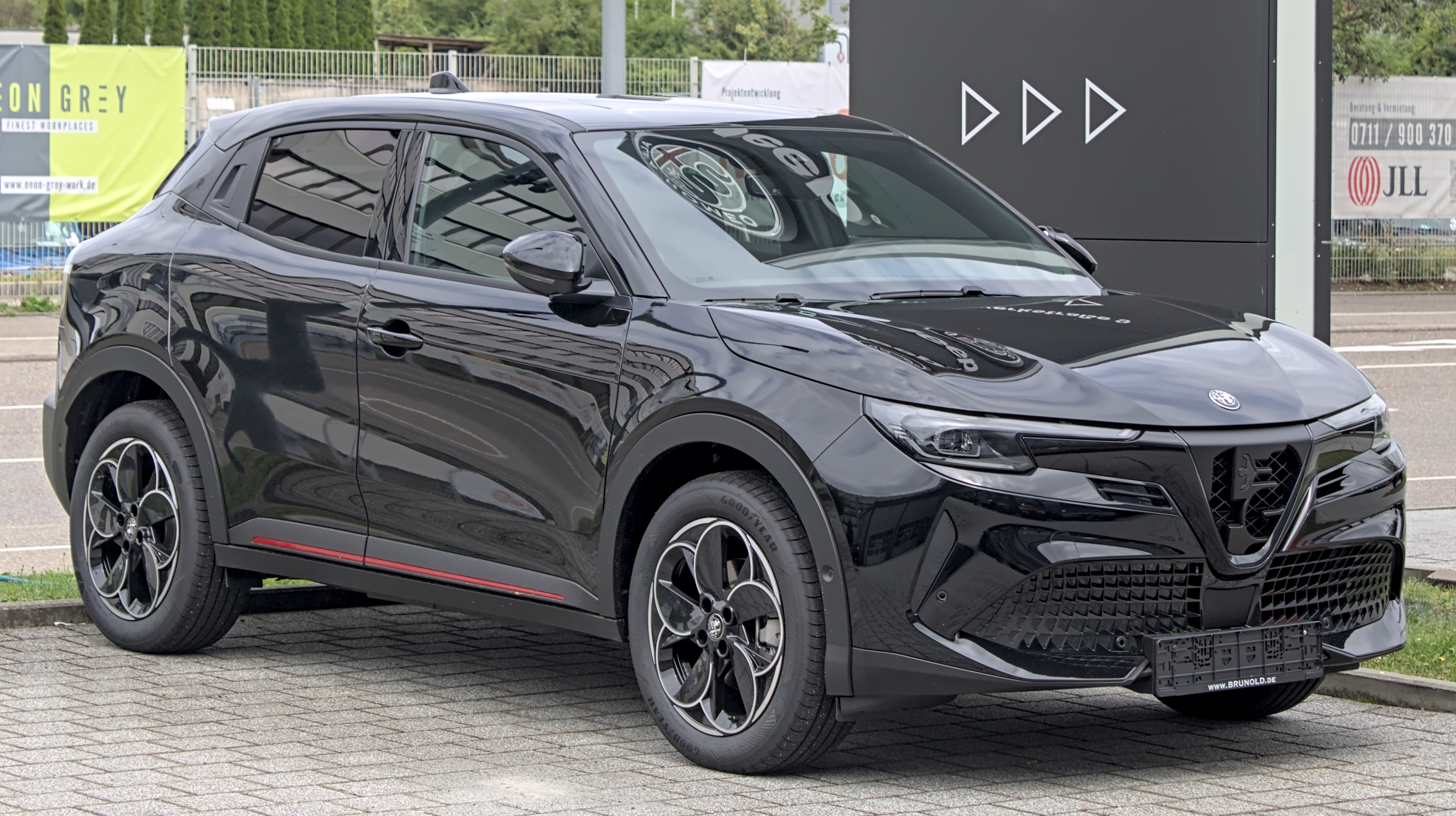
Background
The Alfa Romeo Giulia was unveiled to the press at the Museo Storico Alfa Romeo in Arese, on 24 June 2015. This coincided with the company's 105th anniversary and saw the introduction of a revised logo. Sales were about 34,000 examples per year (2018), then fell to 20,000 per year (2019).
The Alfa Romeo Stelvio was unveiled at the 2016 Los Angeles Auto Show. The Stelvio is Alfa Romeo's first production SUV, competing in the same category as the Porsche Macan, Jaguar F-Pace, Audi Q5, Mercedes-Benz GLC and BMW X3.
The Alfa Romeo Tonale is a compact crossover SUV (C-segment) introduced in March 2022. It is the first hybrid-powered Alfa Romeo and was the first new model introduced by the brand in six years.
The Alfa Romeo 33 Stradale was unveiled on August 30, 2023, with the first deliveries in 2024, and a limited production run of 33 units. The car pays tribute to the Alfa Romeo 33 Stradale of 1967.
The Alfa Romeo Junior (previously Milano) is a subcompact crossover SUV (B-segment) introduced in April 2024. It is the brand's first B-segment SUV, and its first battery electric car.

=== List of Alfa Romeo models ===
Alfa Romeos

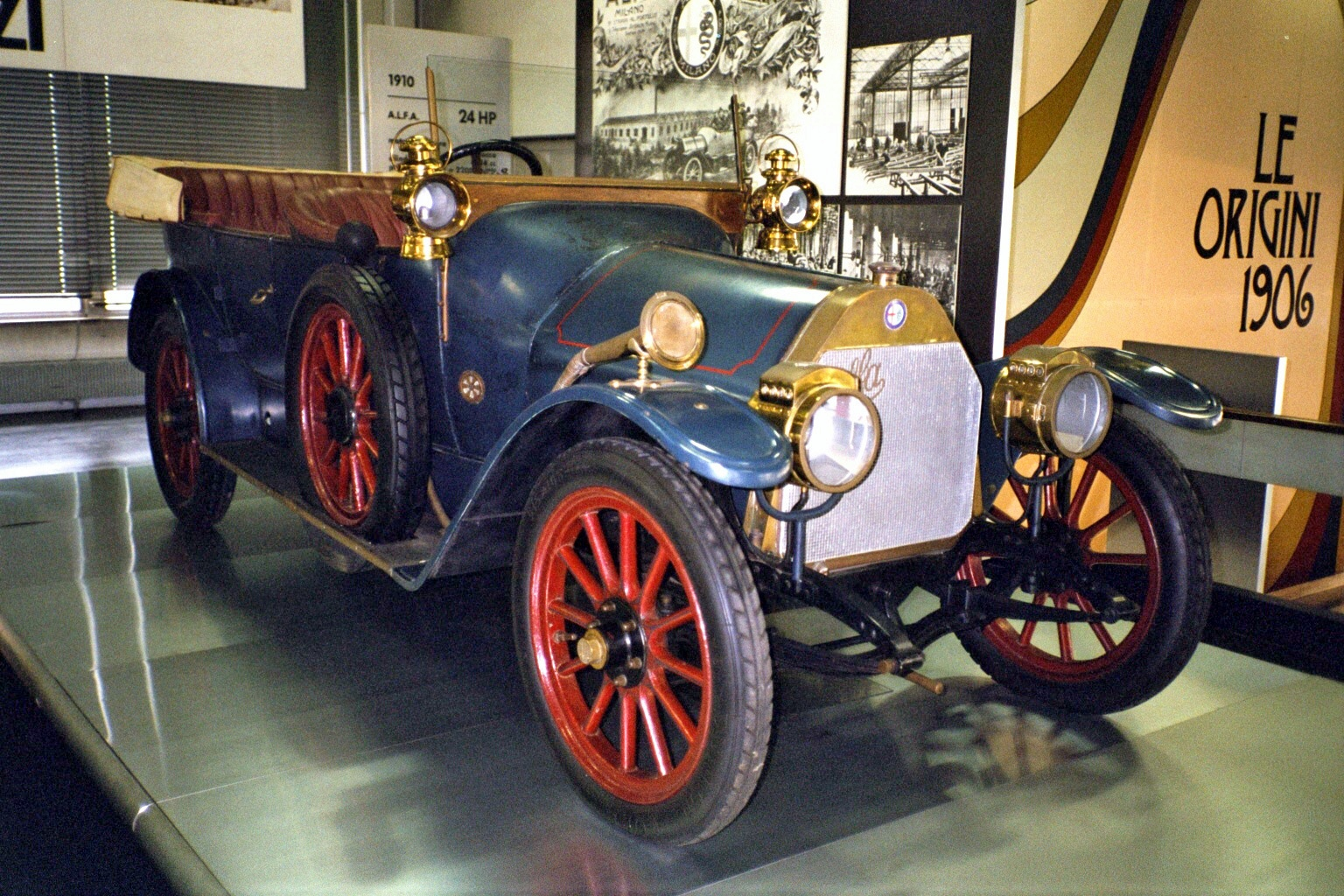
ALFA 24 HP (1910–1914)

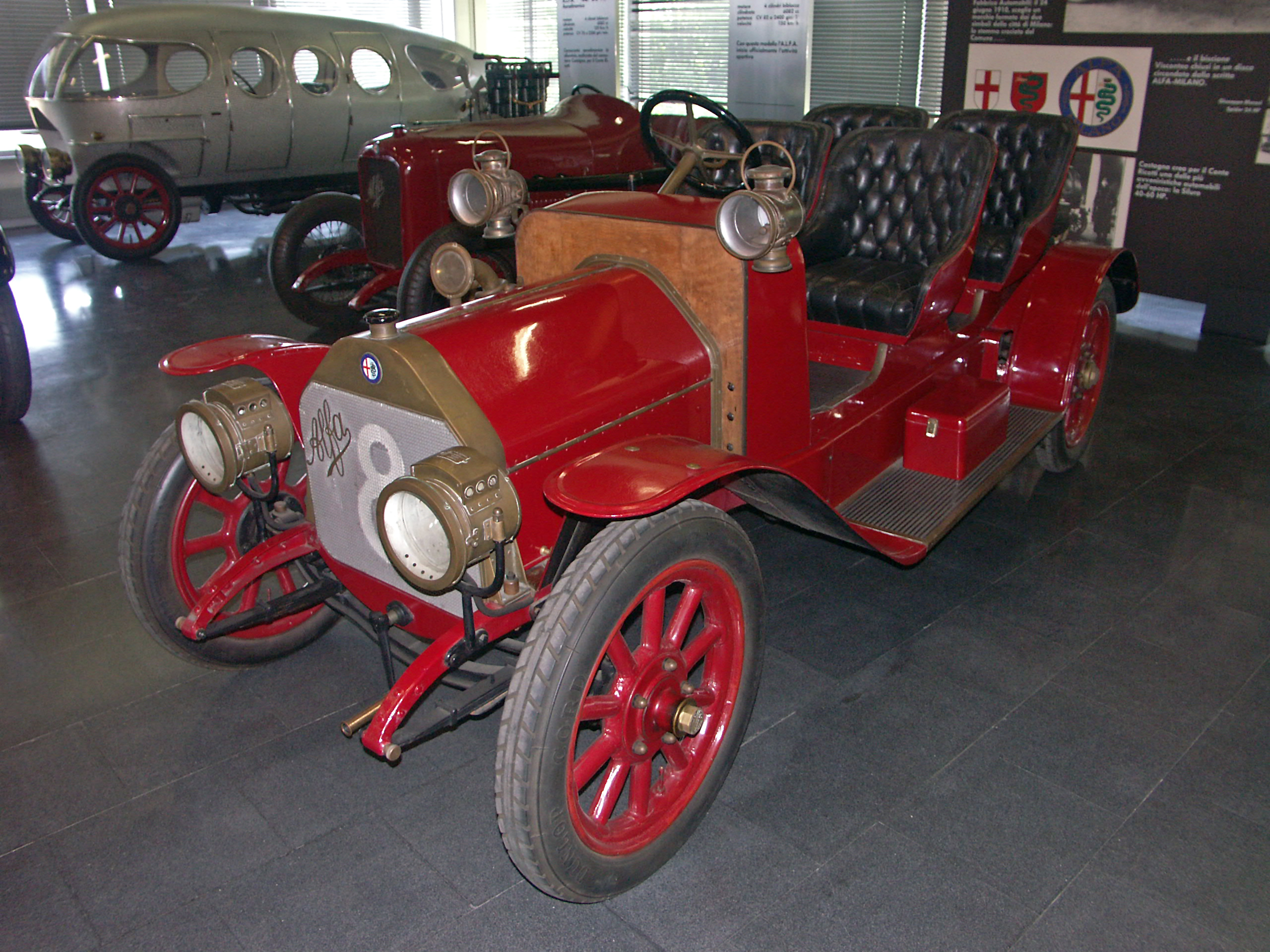
ALFA 15 HP (1911–1913)

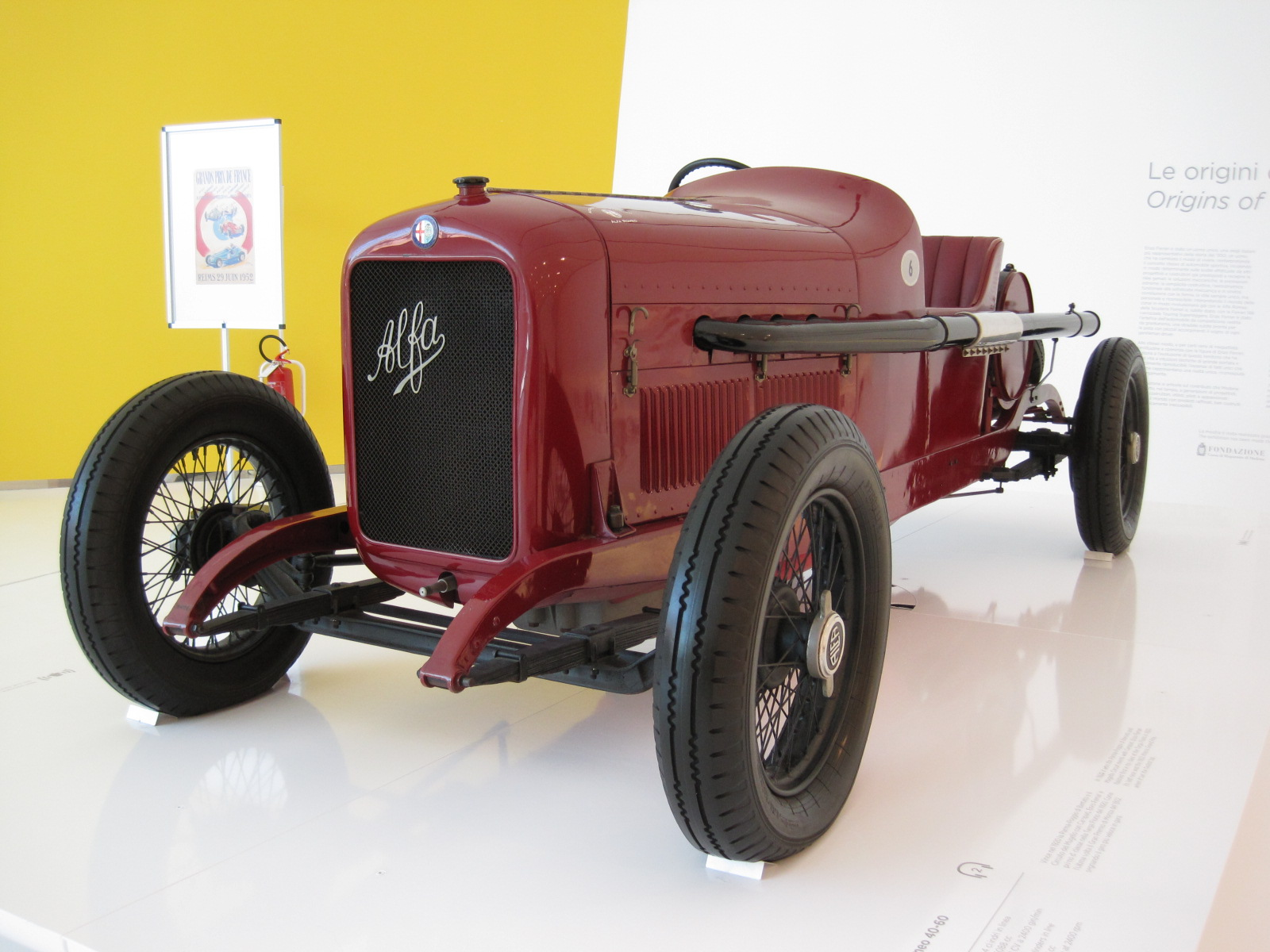
ALFA 40/60 HP (1913–1914)

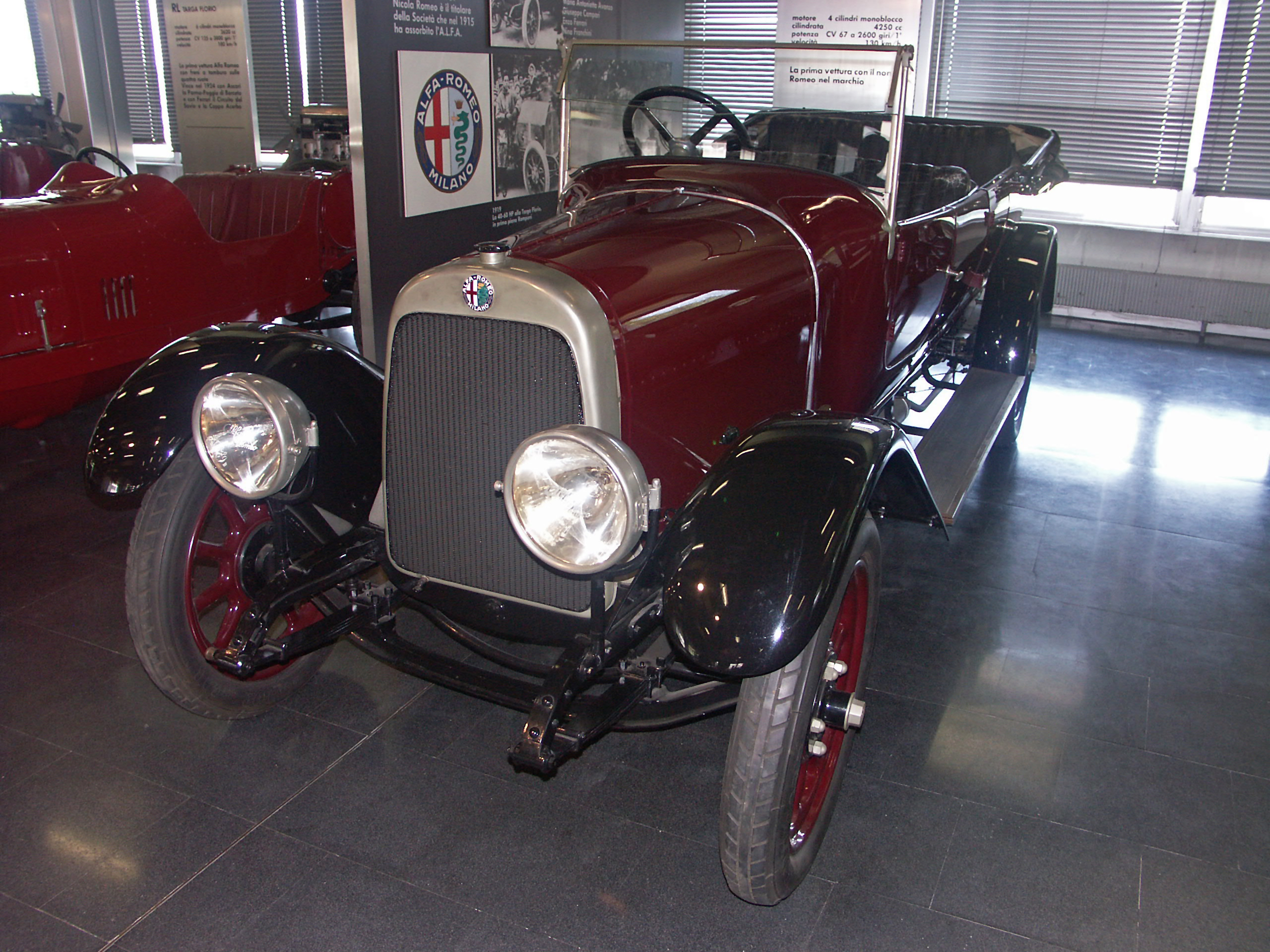
ALFA 20/30 HP (1914–1922)

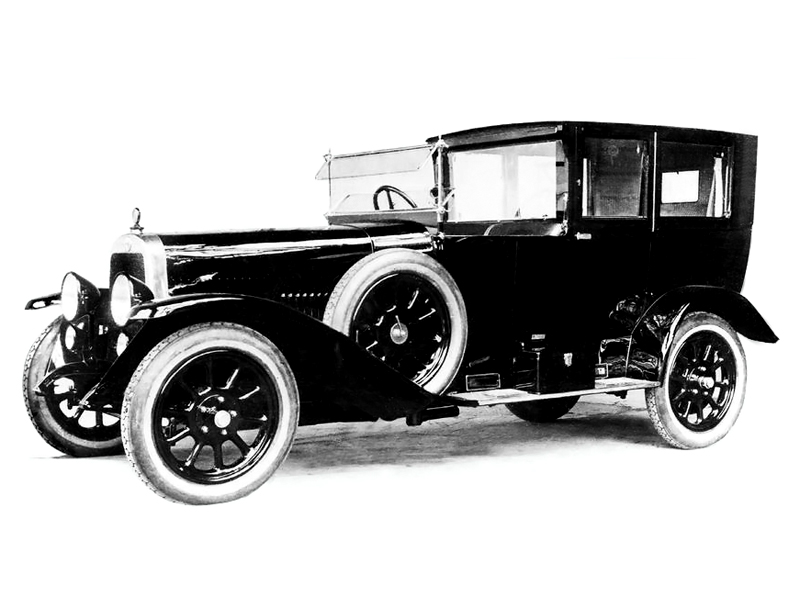
G1 (1921–1923)

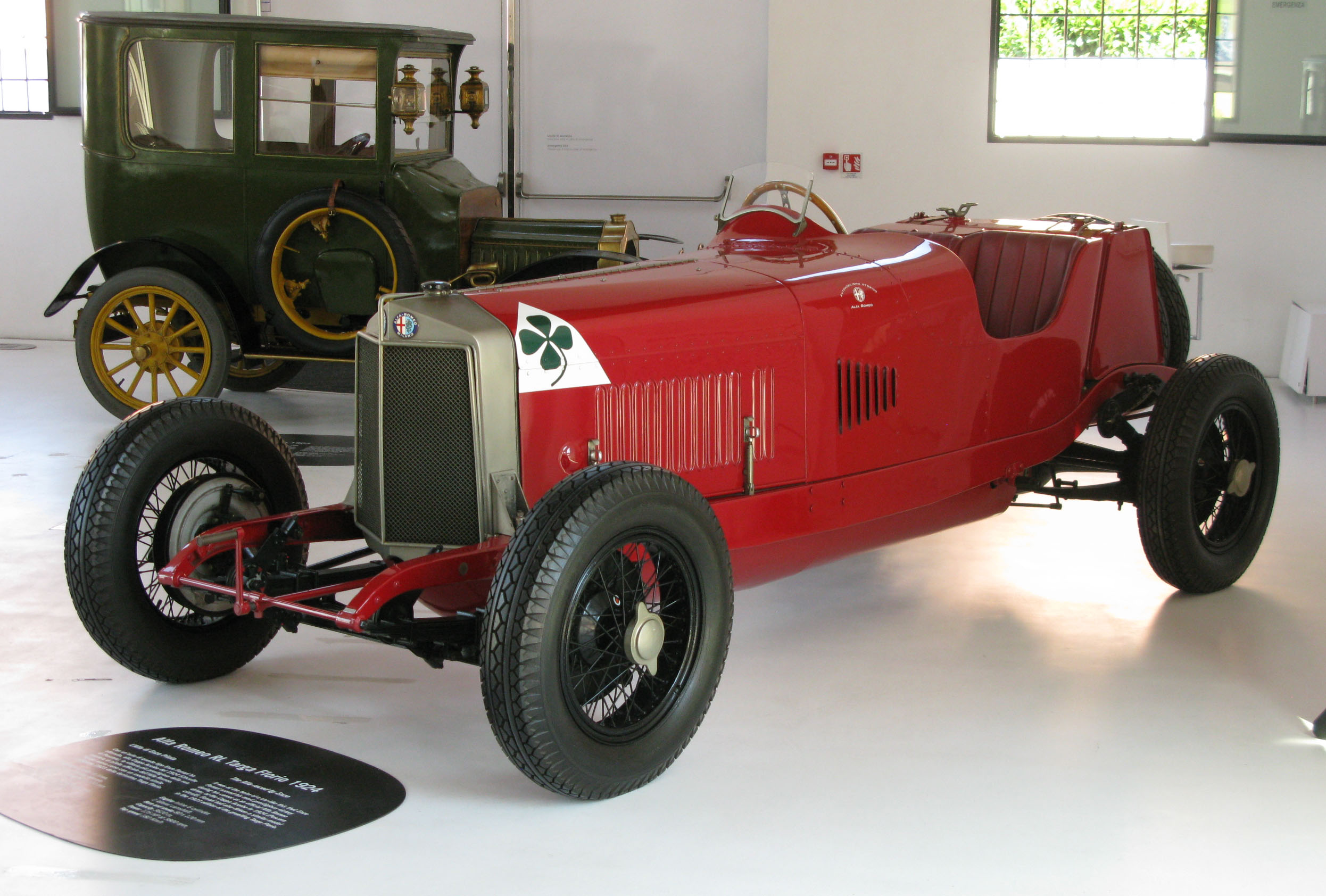
RL (1922–1927)

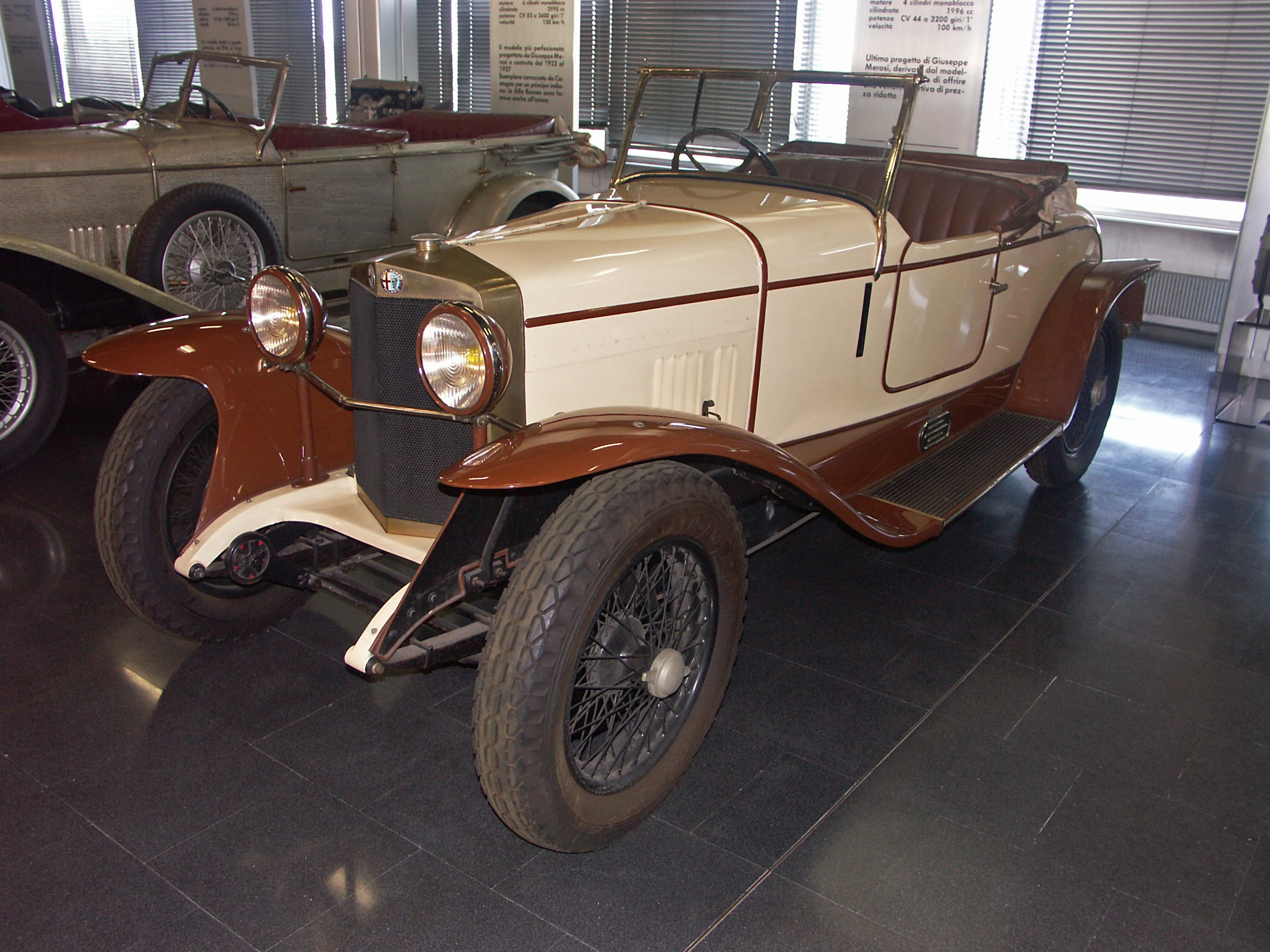
RM (1923–1925)

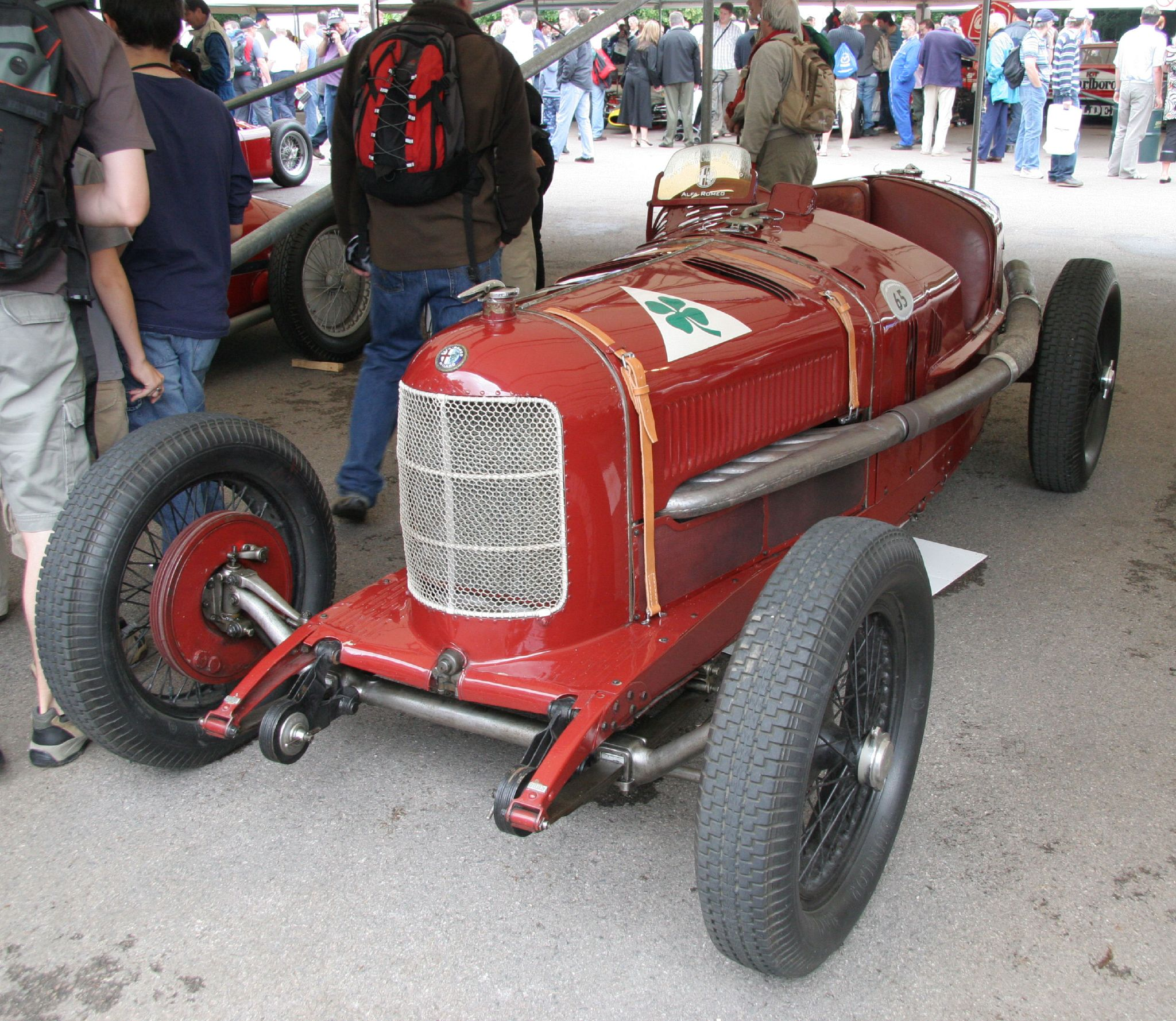
P2 (1924–1930)

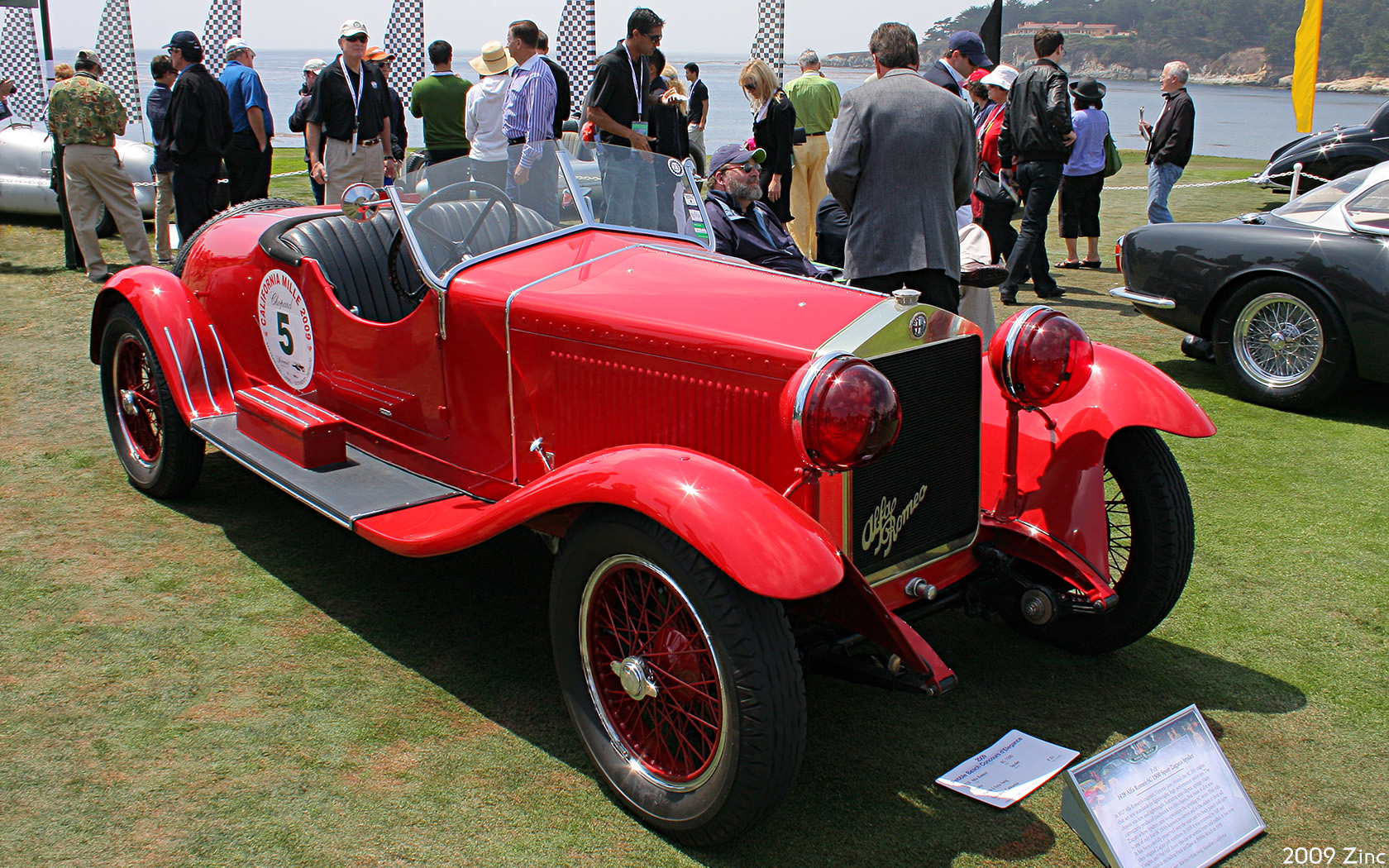
6C 1500 (1927–1929)

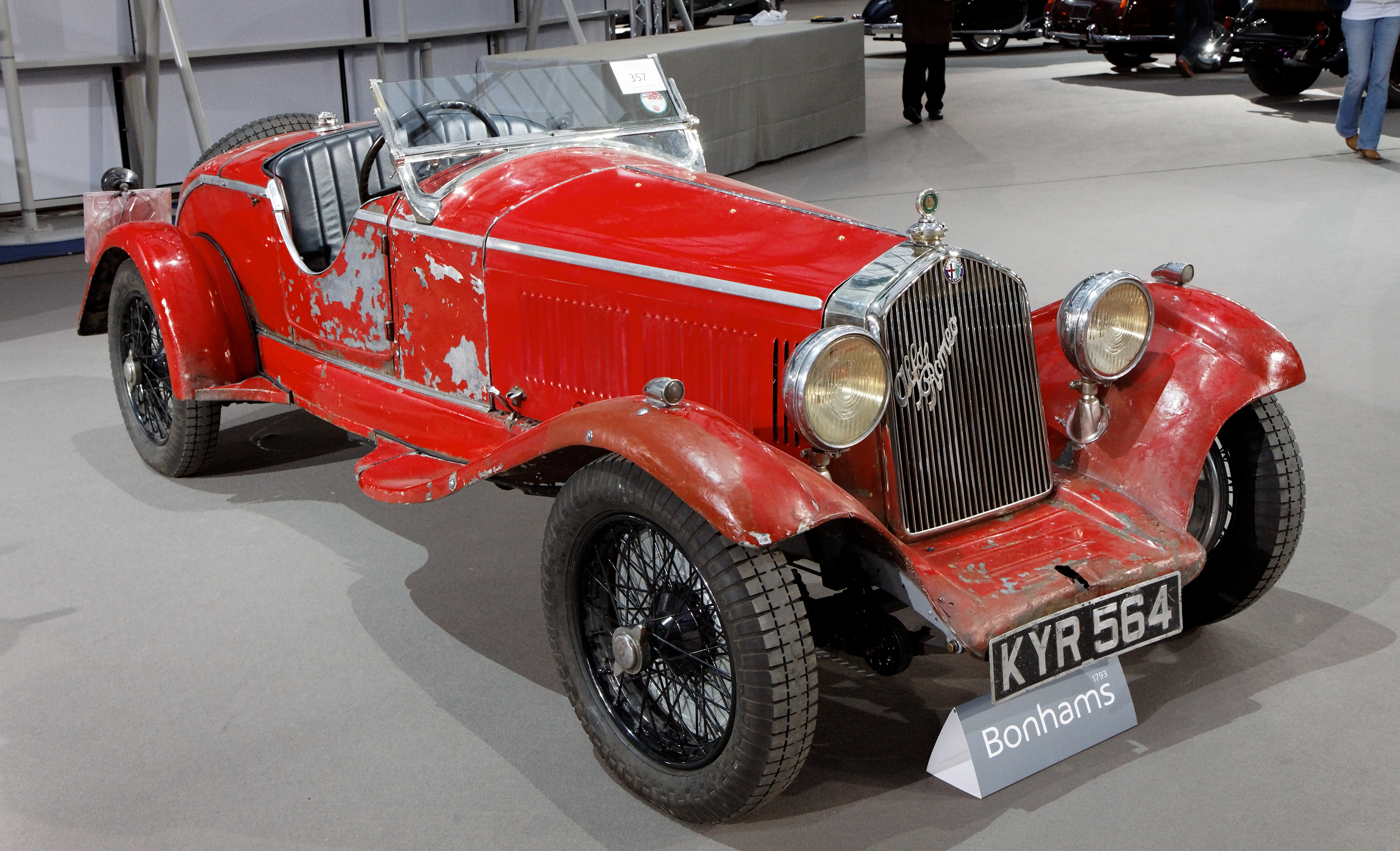
6C 1750 (1929–1933)

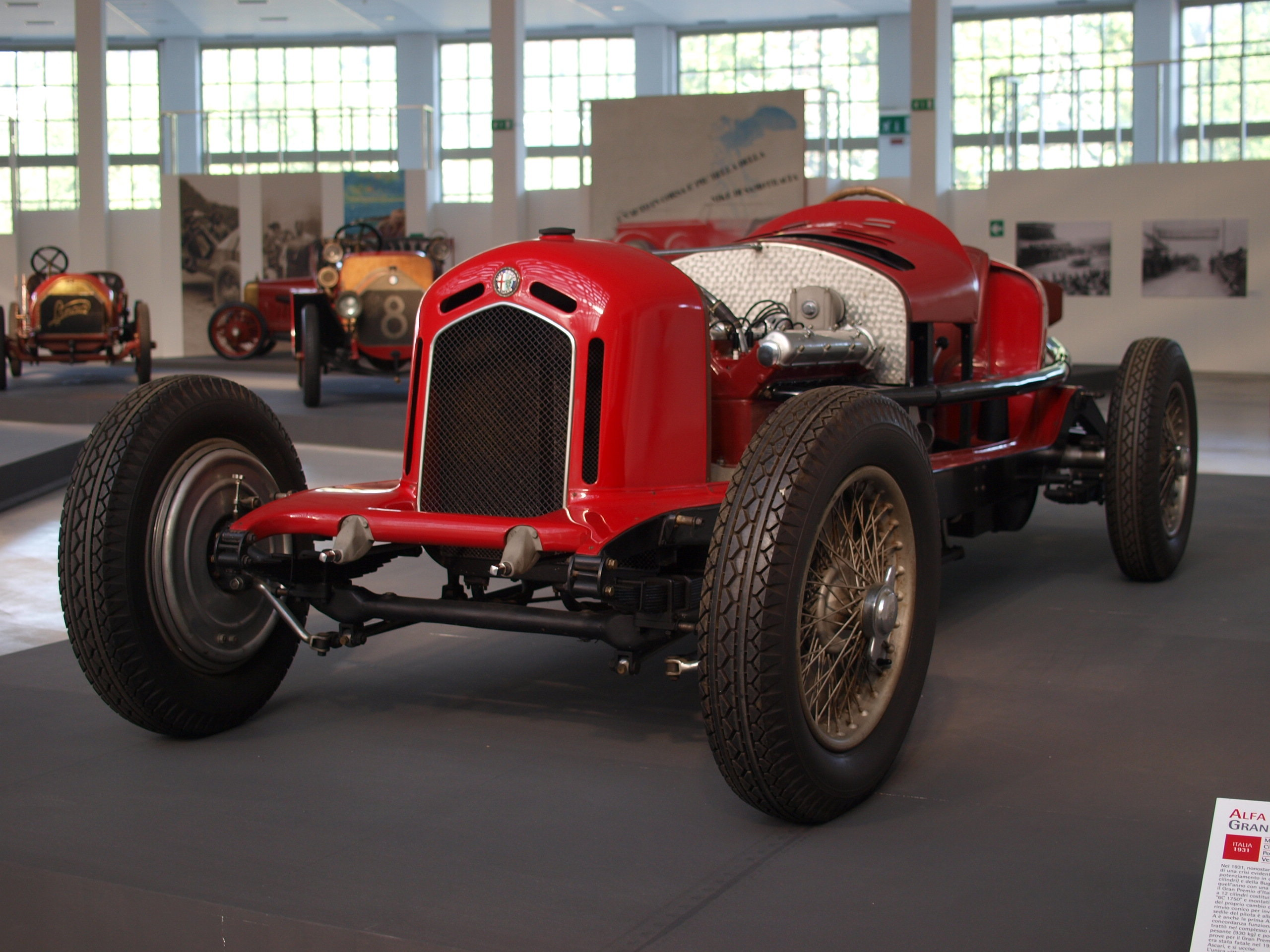
Tipo A (1931)

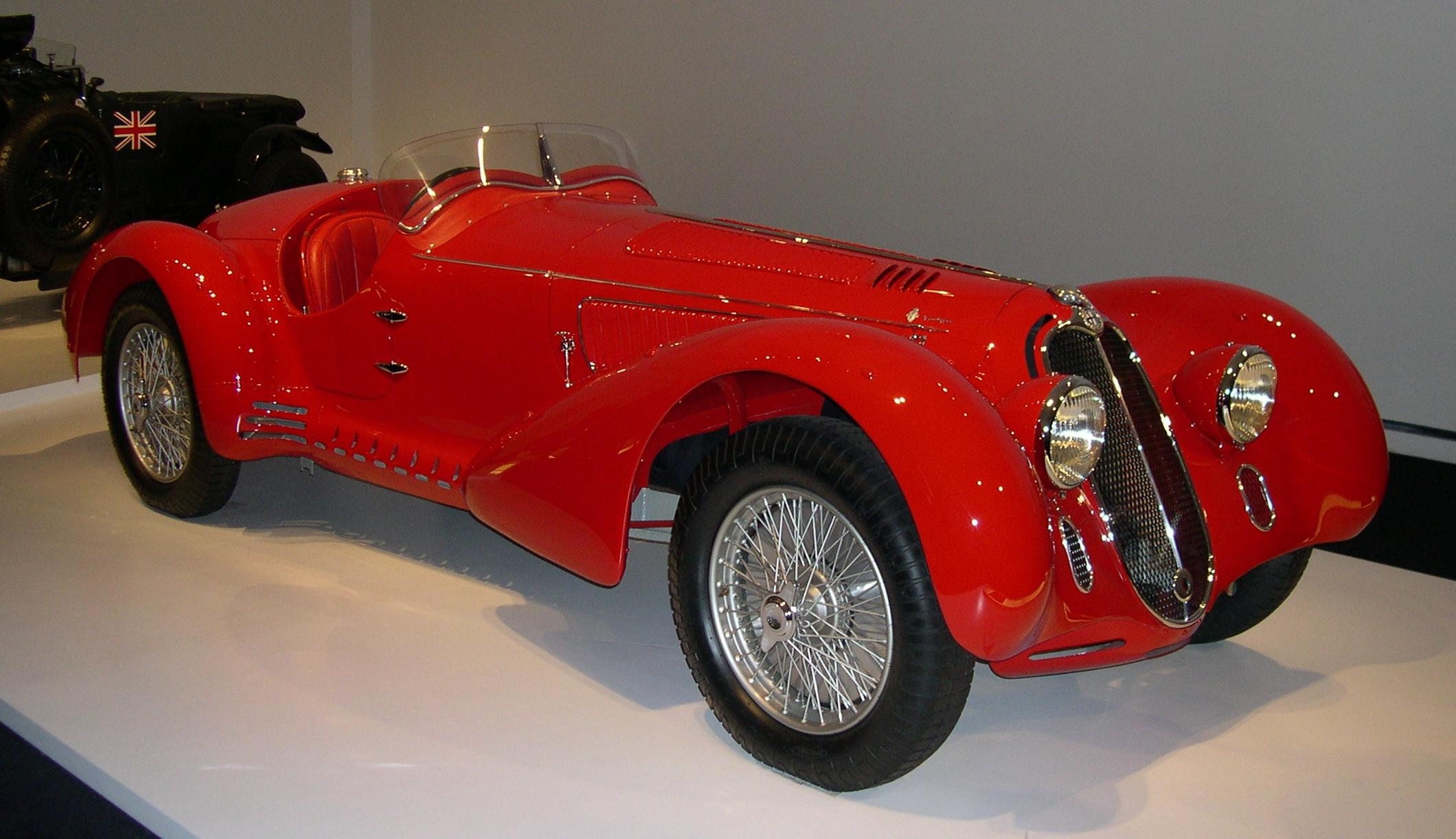
8C (1931–1939)

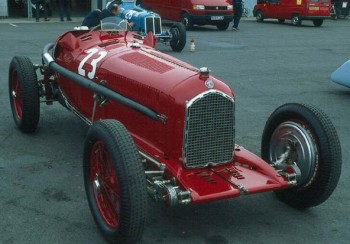
P3 (1932–1935)

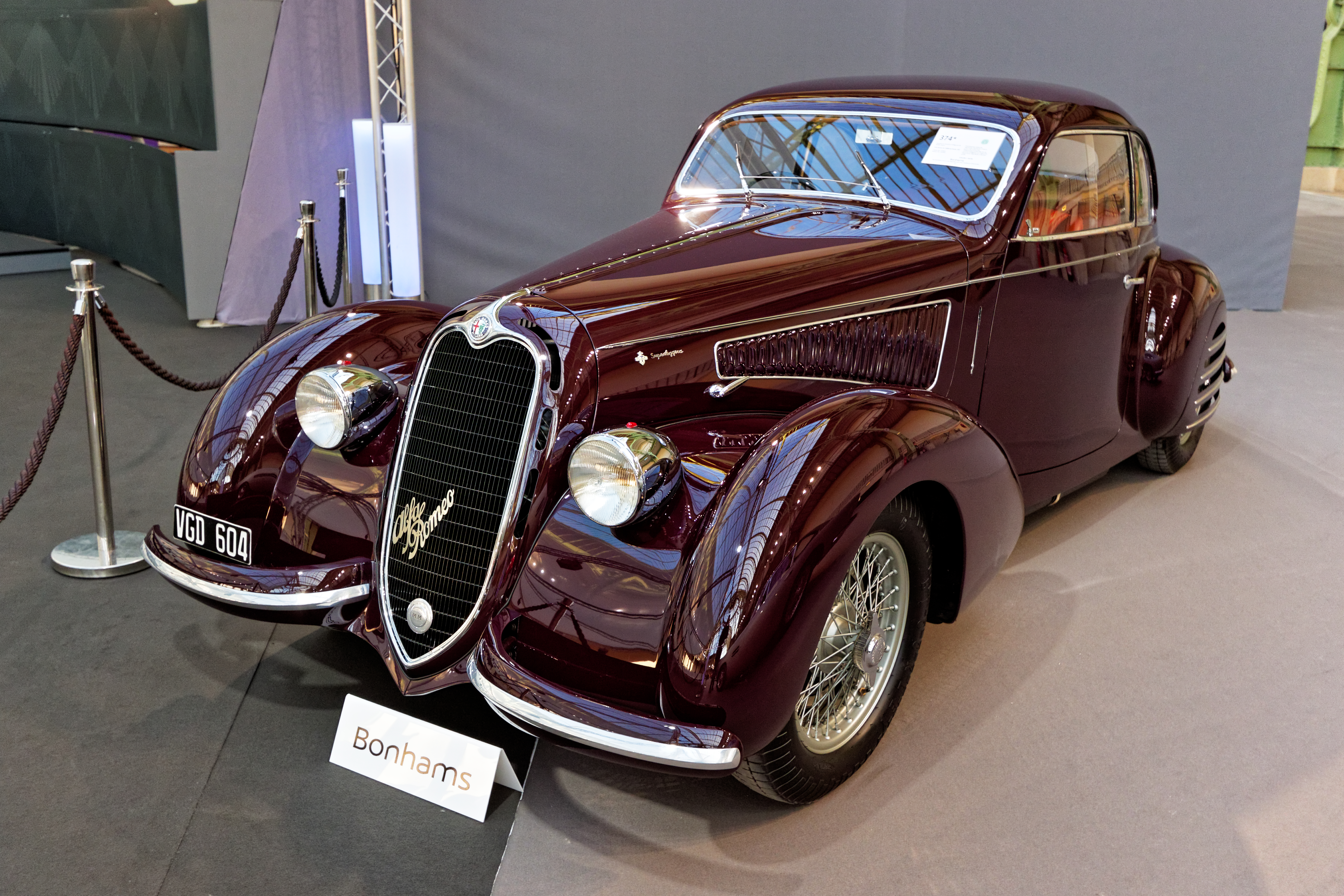
6C 2300 (1933–1938)

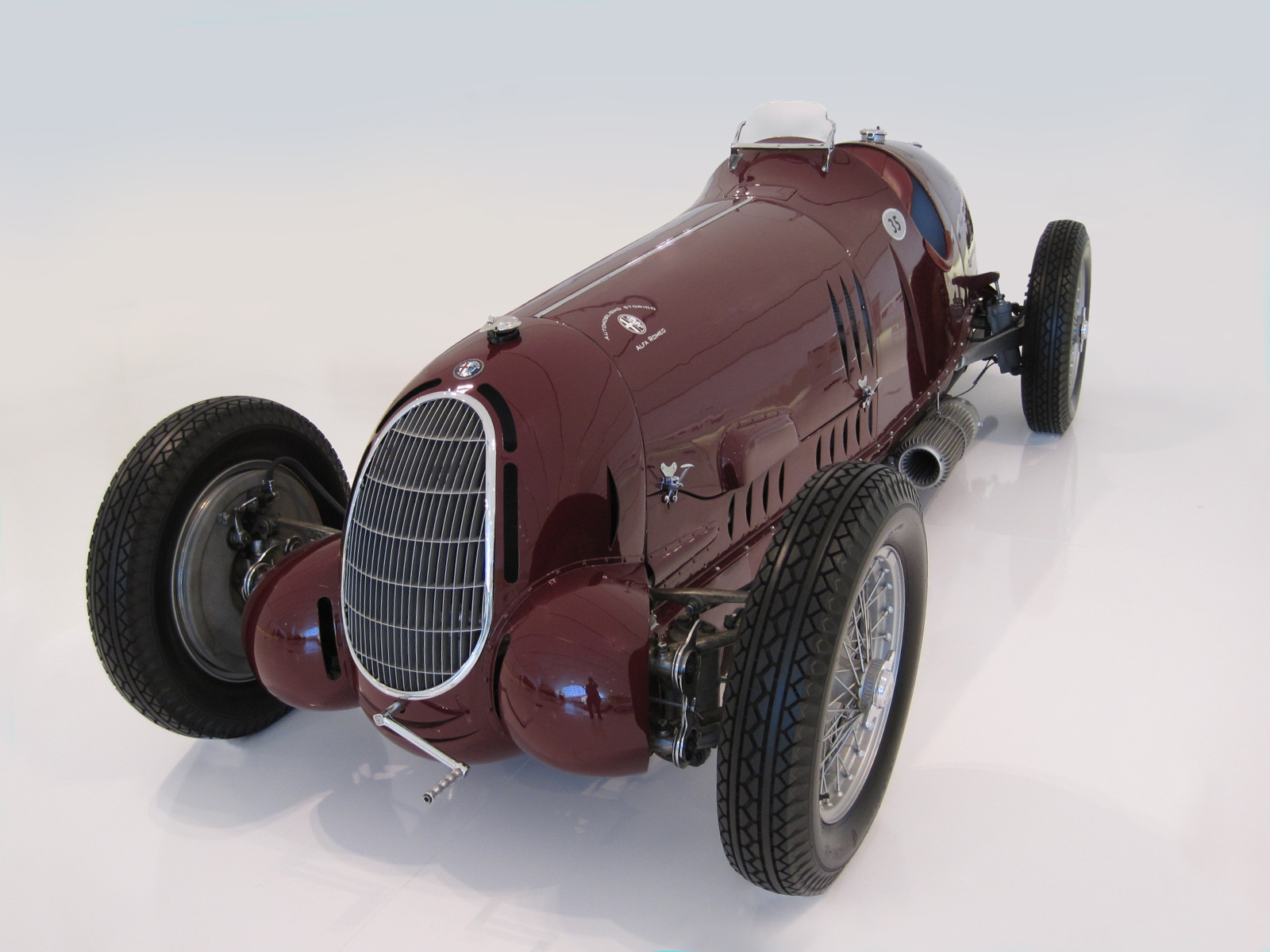
12C (1936–1937)

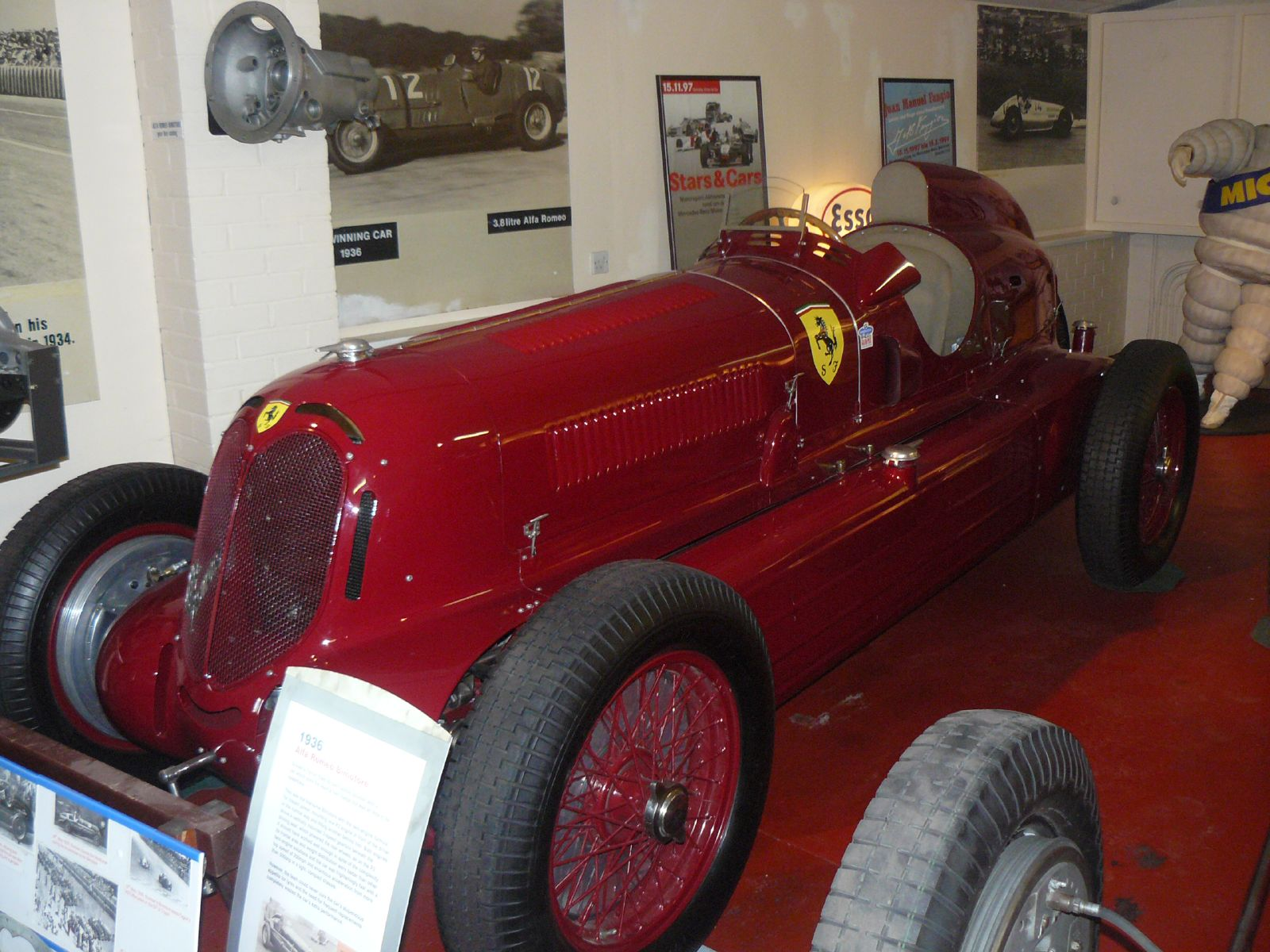
16C Bimotore (1936)

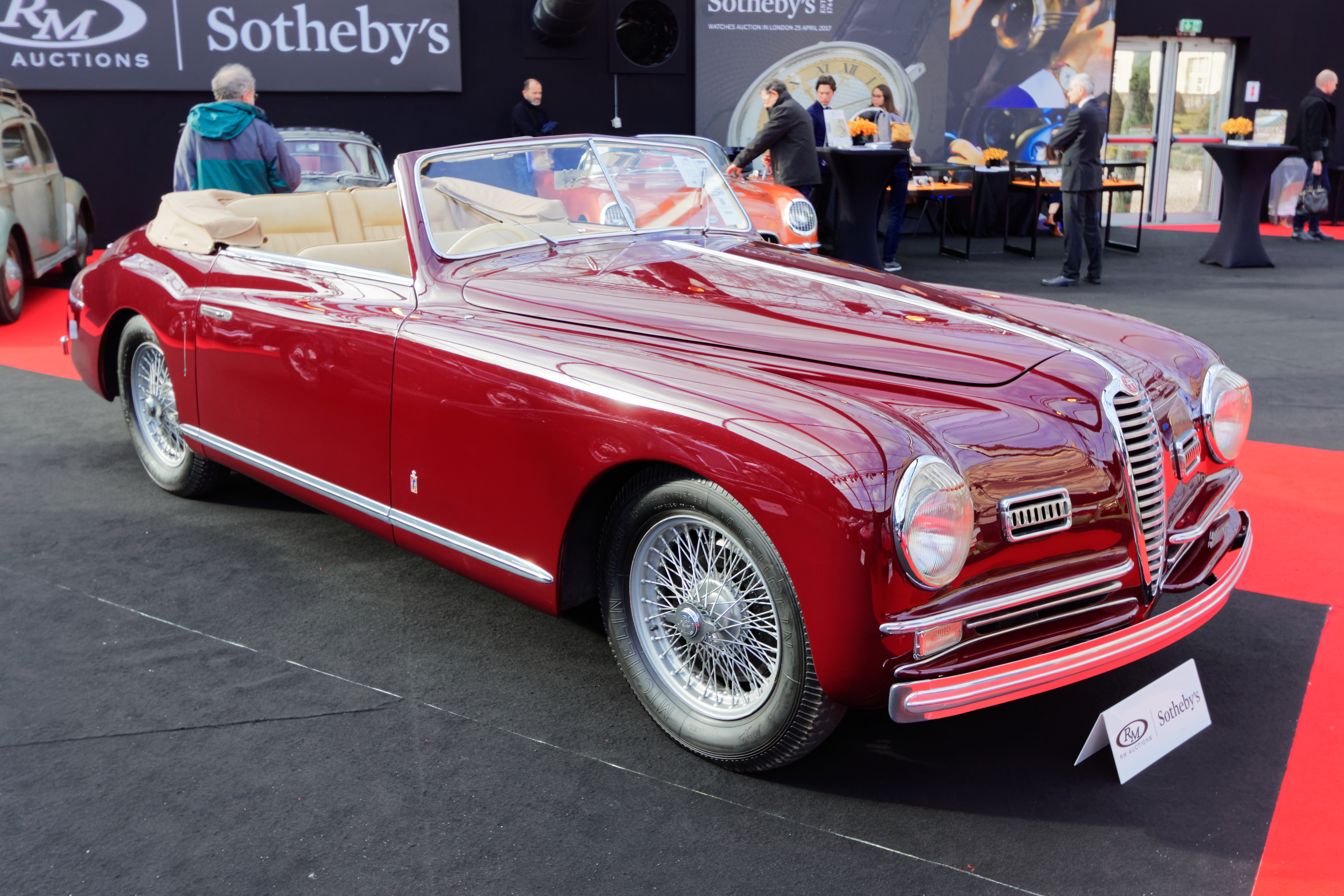
6C 2500 (1938–1952)

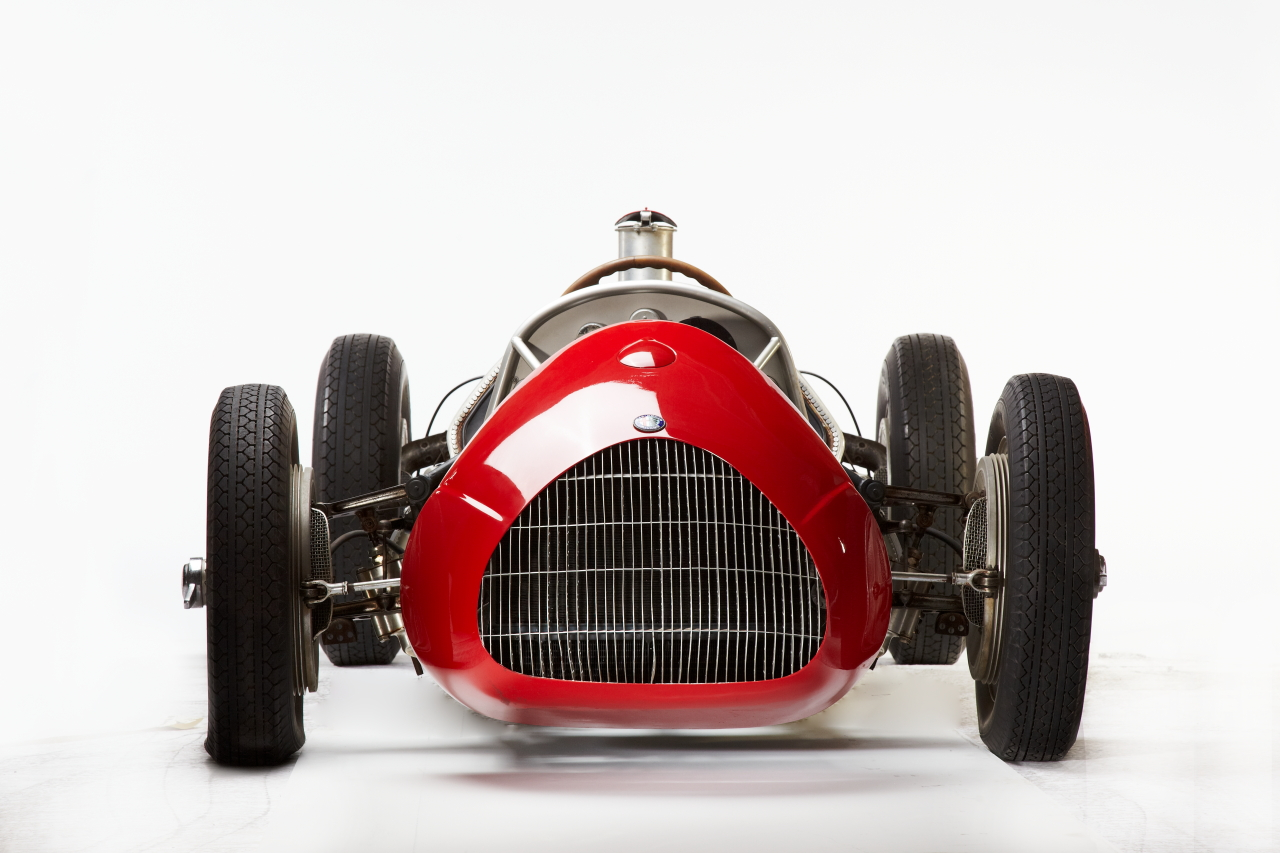
Tipo 512 (1940)

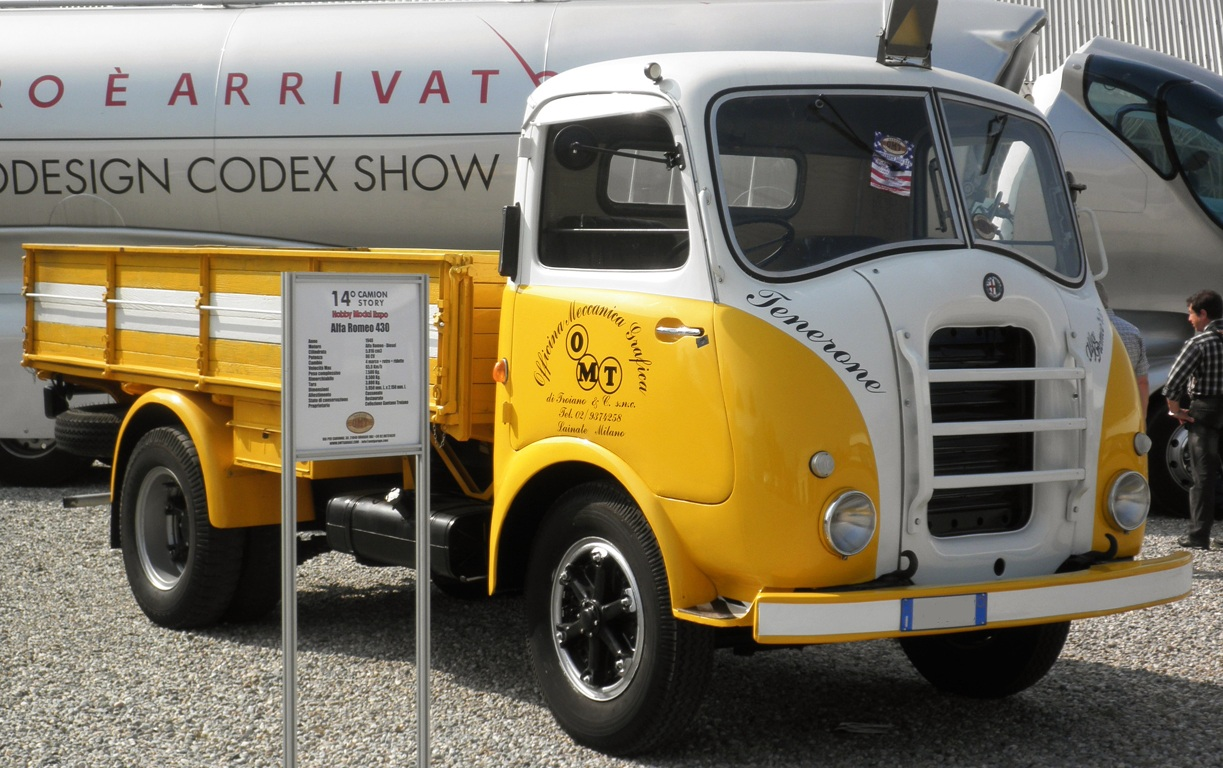
430 (1942–1950)

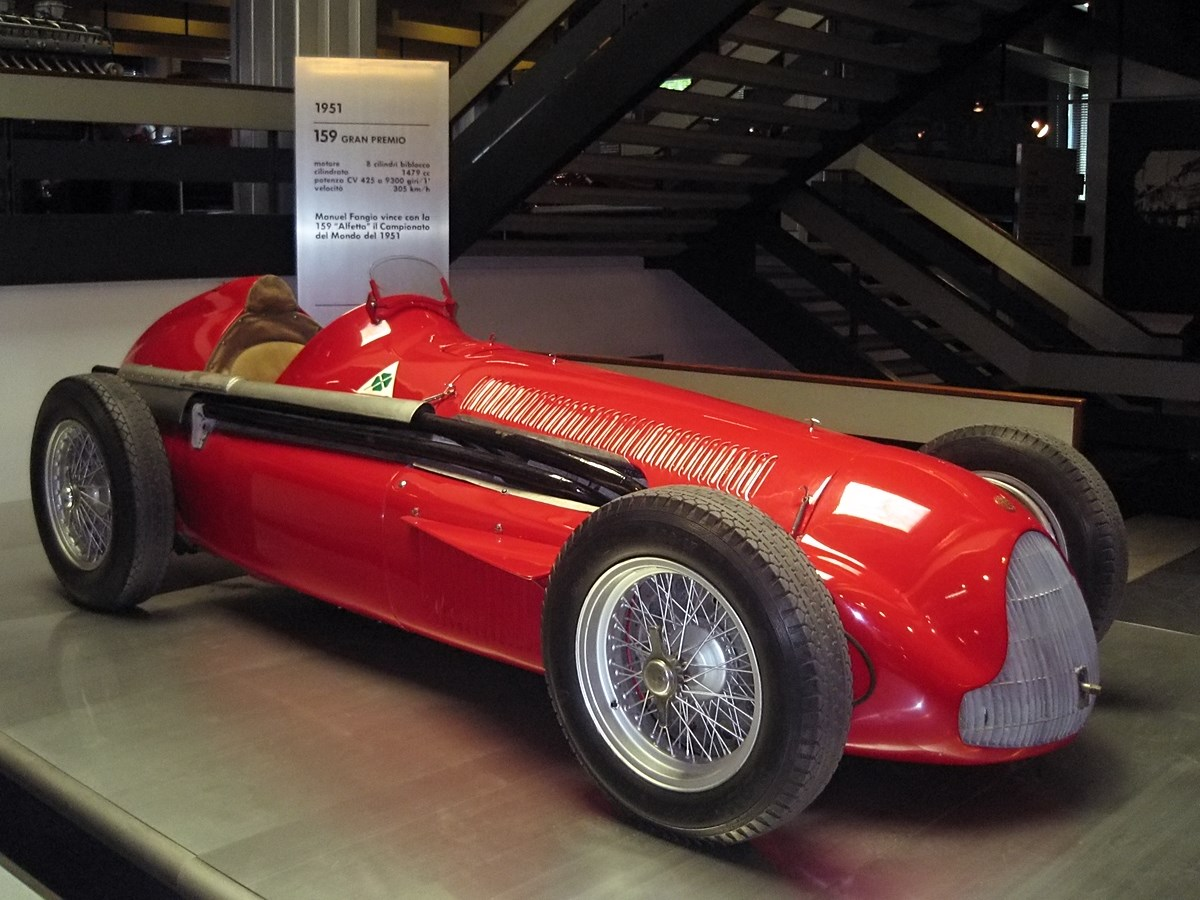
158/159 (1938–1951)

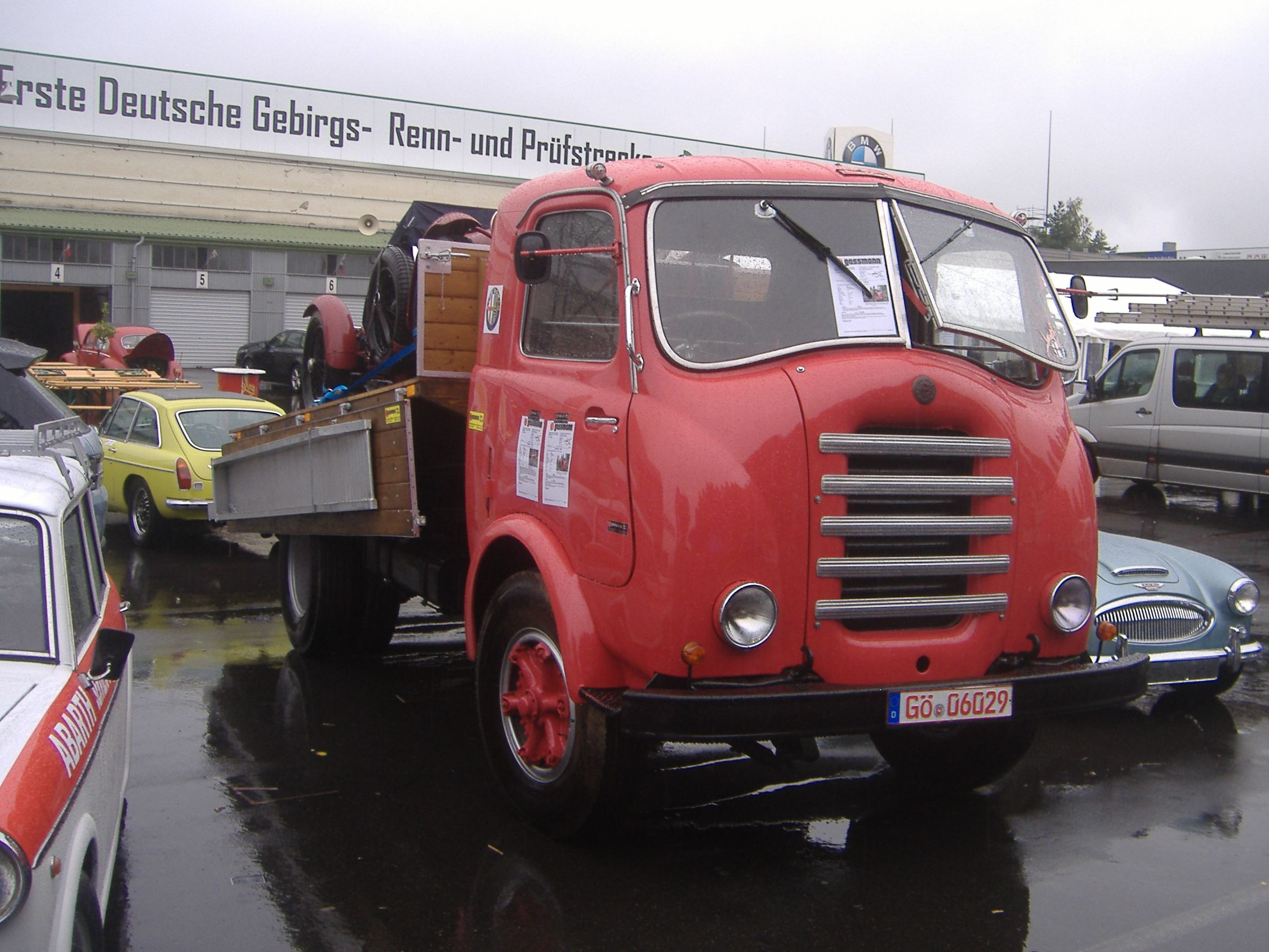
450/455 (1947–1959)

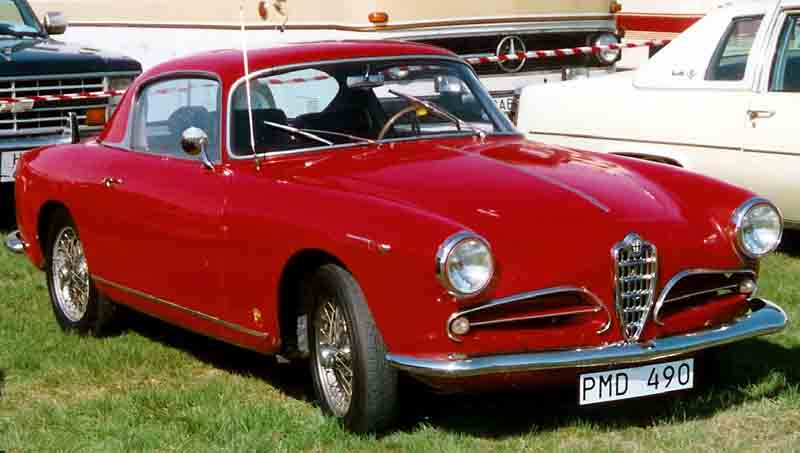
1900 (1950–1959)

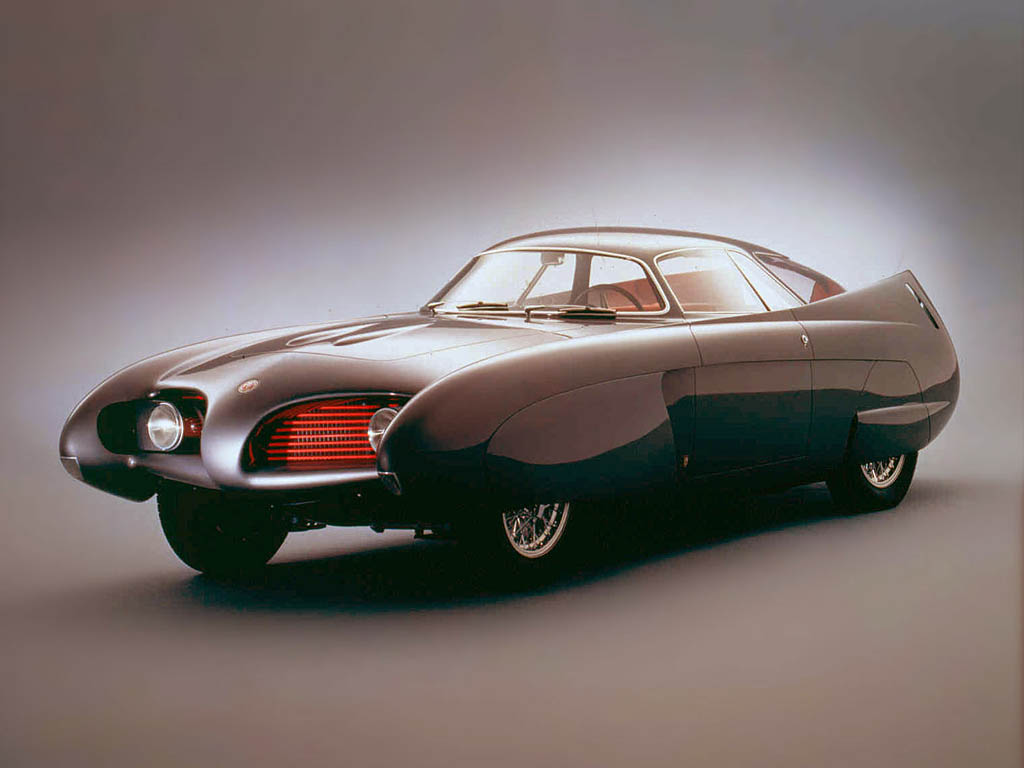
BAT 5, 7 and 9 (1952–1955)

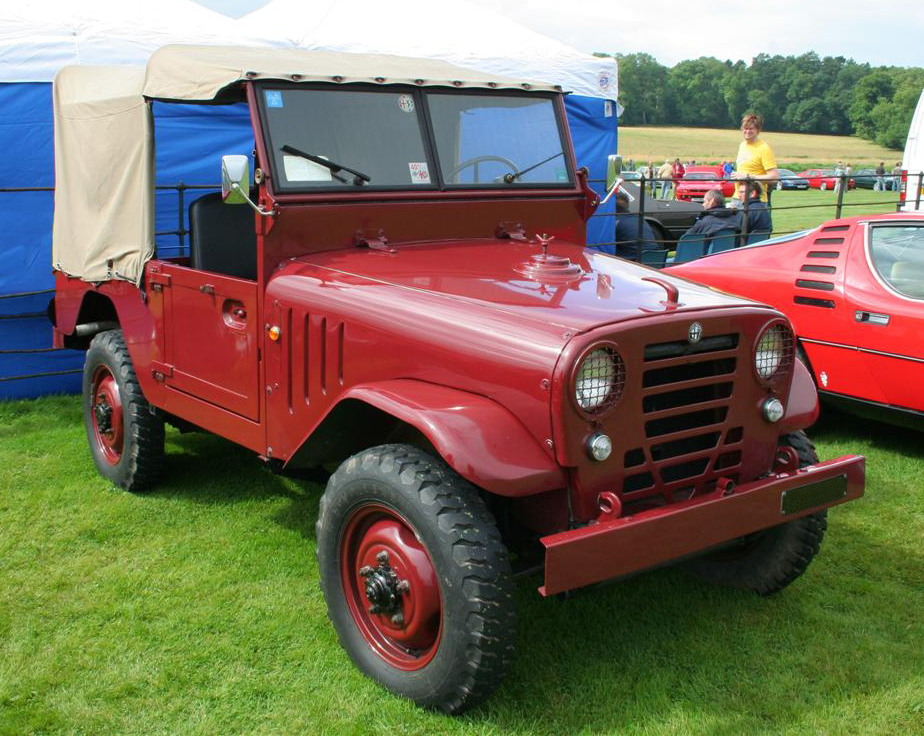
Matta (1952–1954)

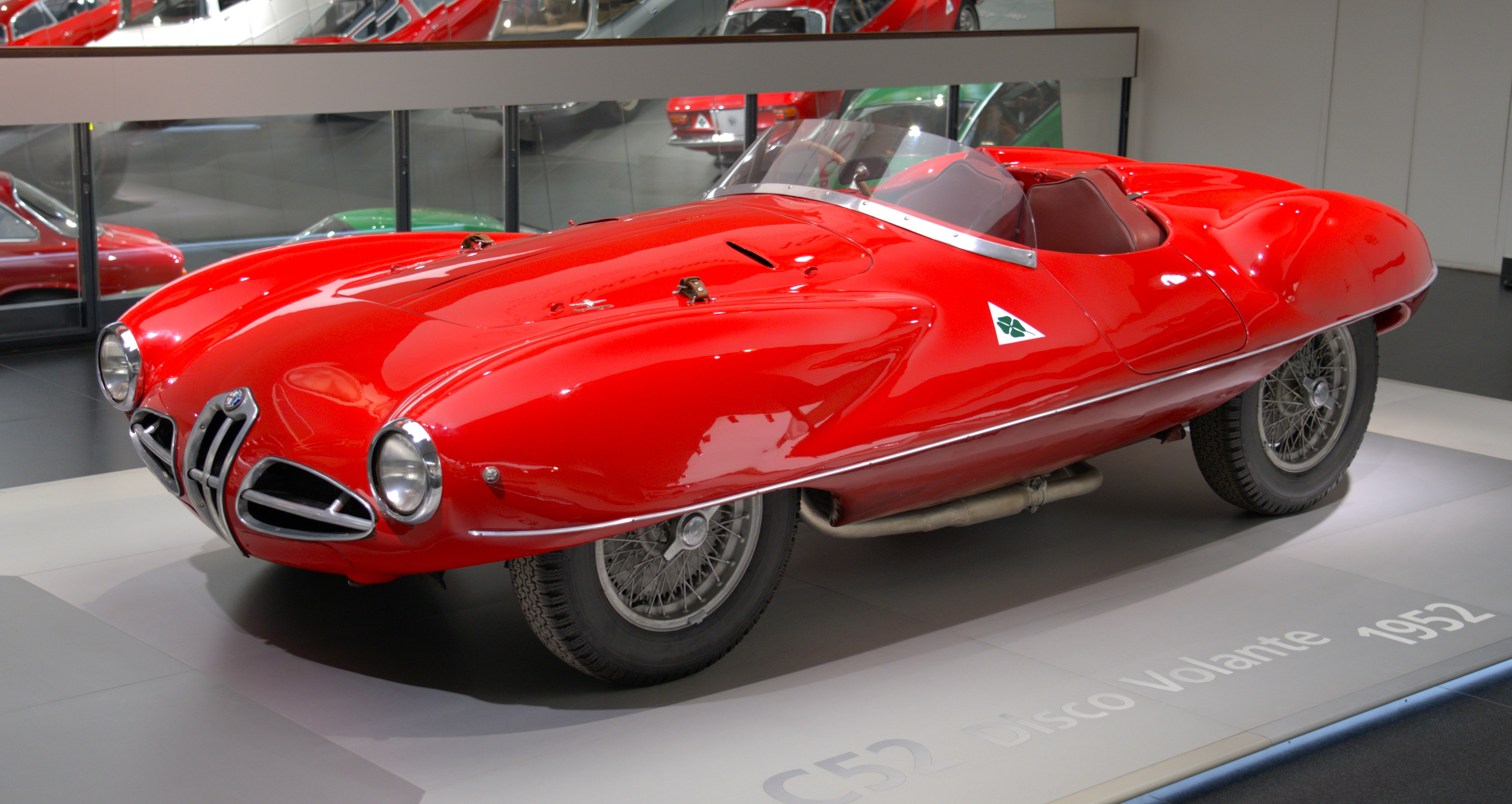
Disco Volante (1952–1953)

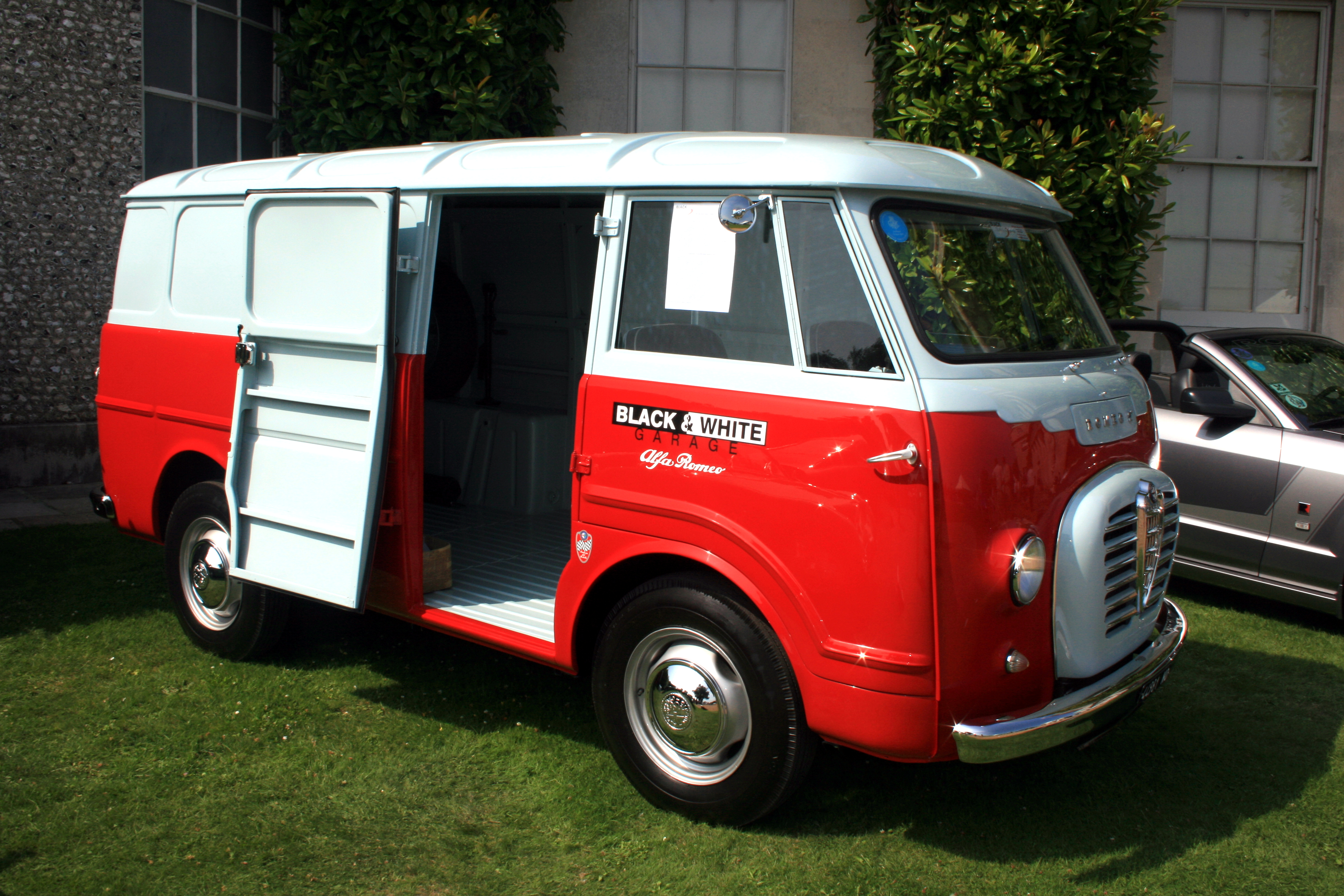
Romeo (1954–1983)

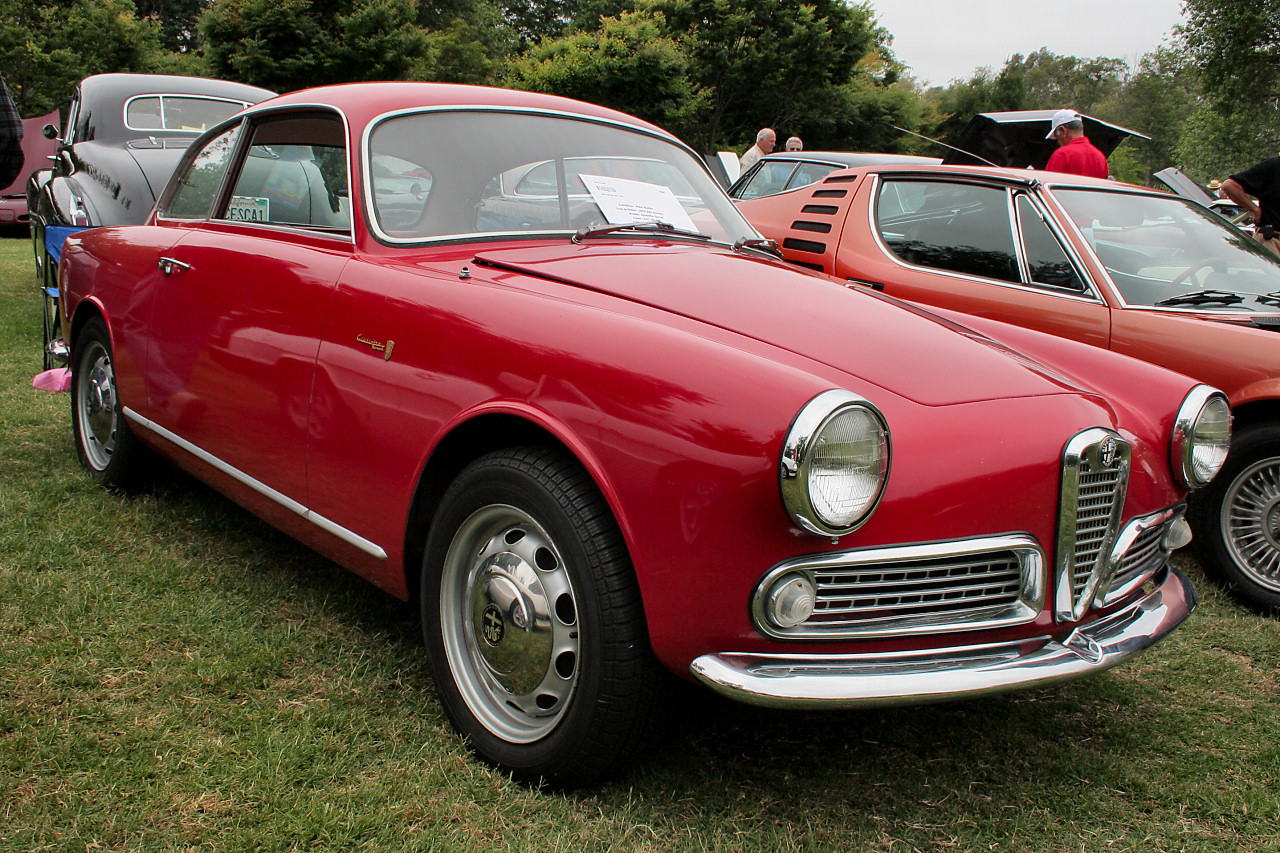
Giulietta (1954–1965)

2000 (1958–1962)

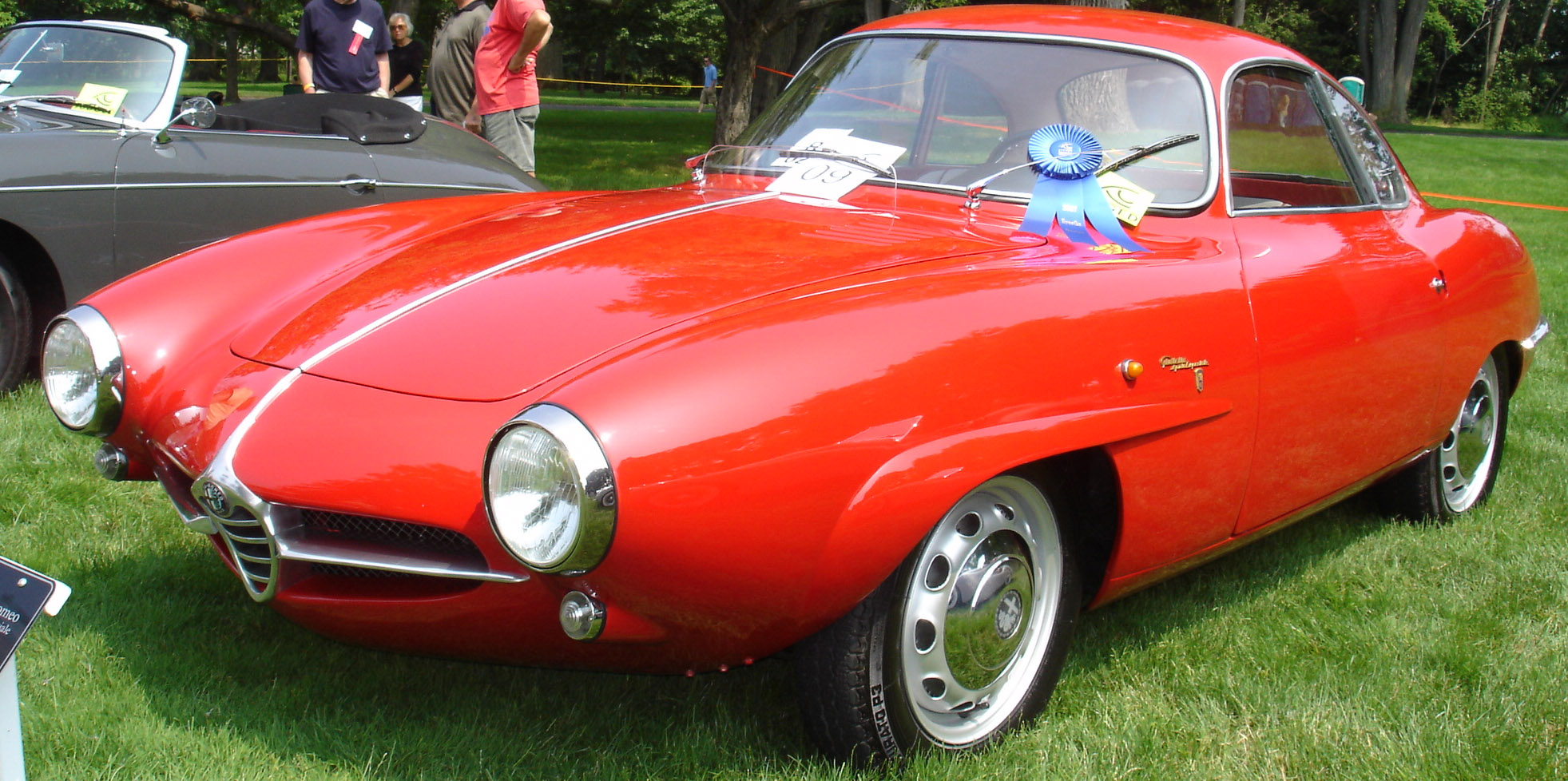
Giulietta SS (1959–1966)

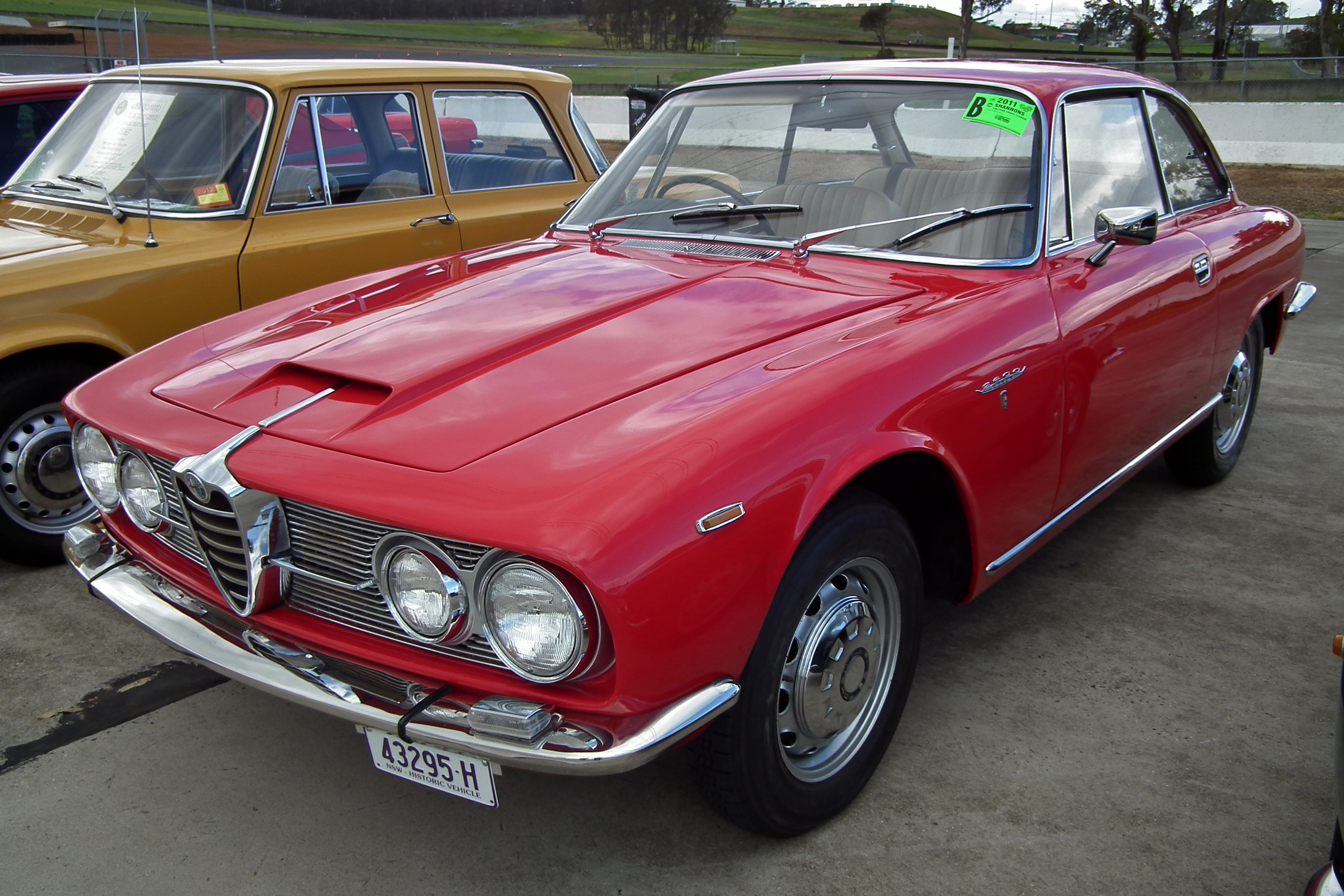
2600 (1961–1968)

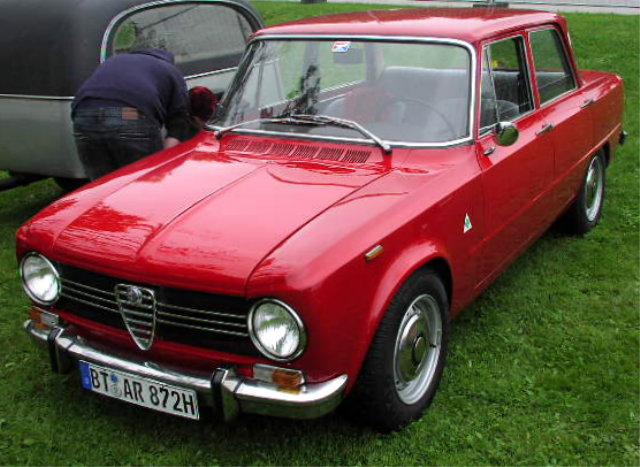
Giulia (1962–1978)

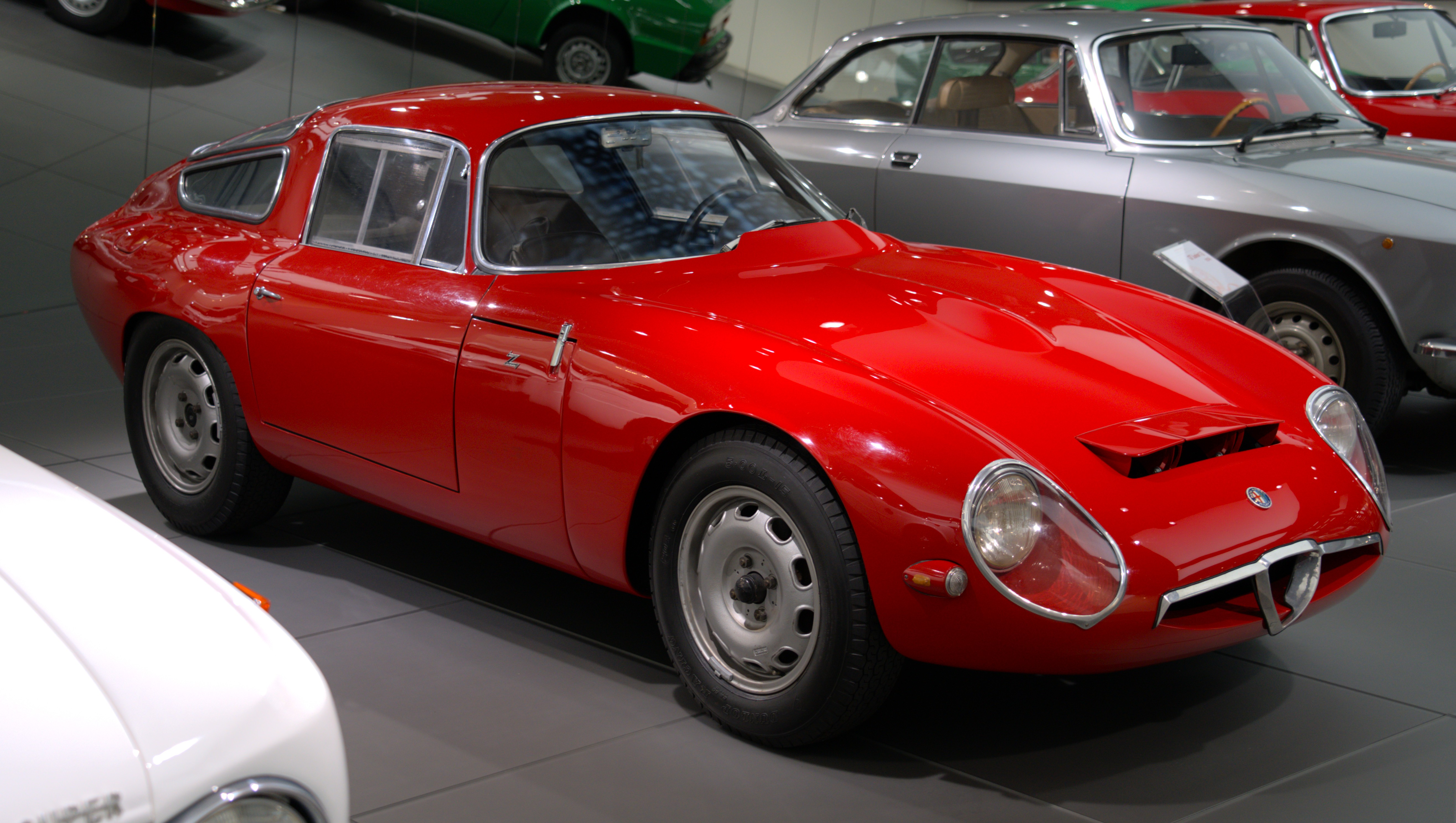
TZ (1963–1965)

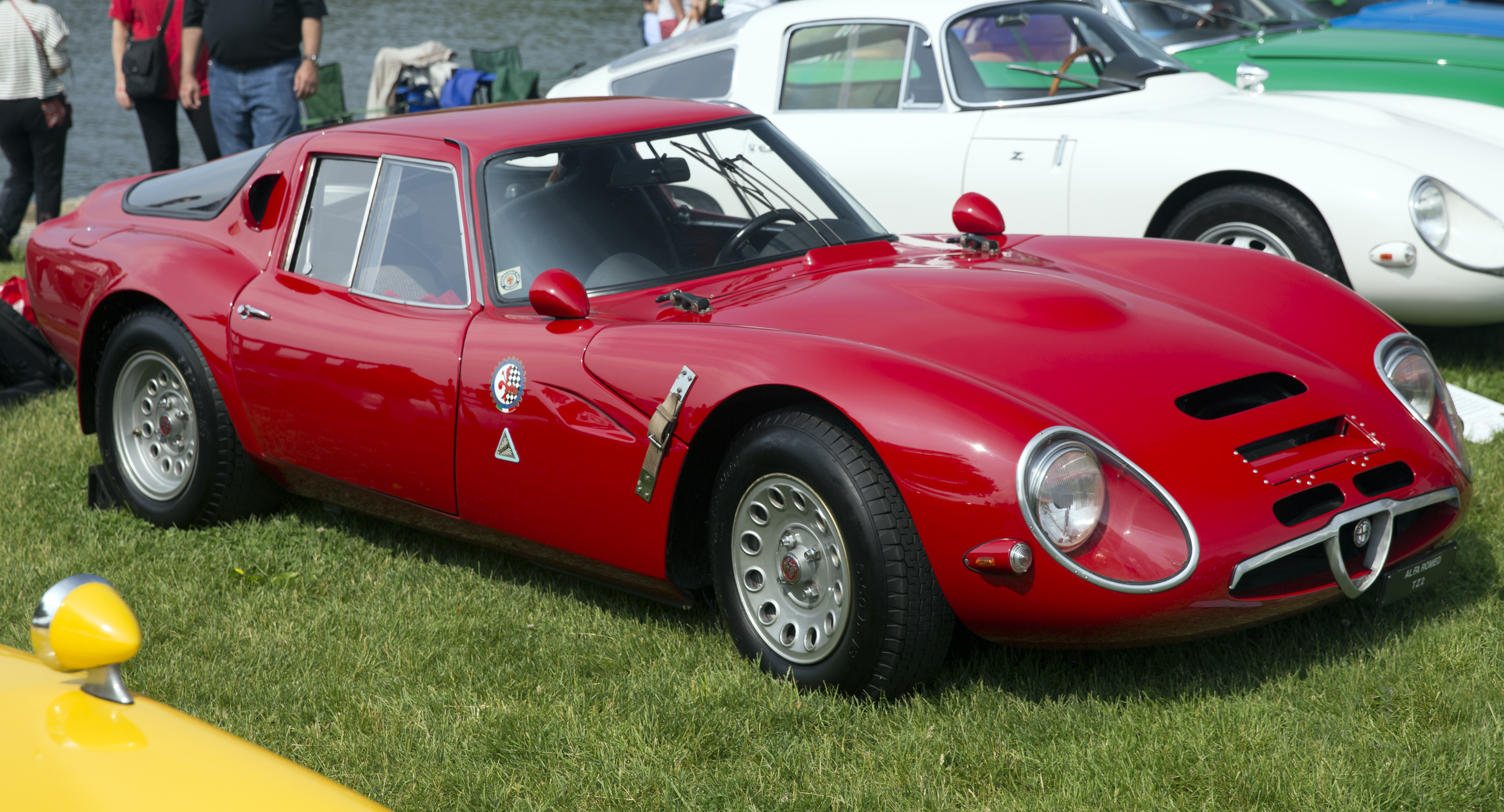
TZ2 (1965–1967)

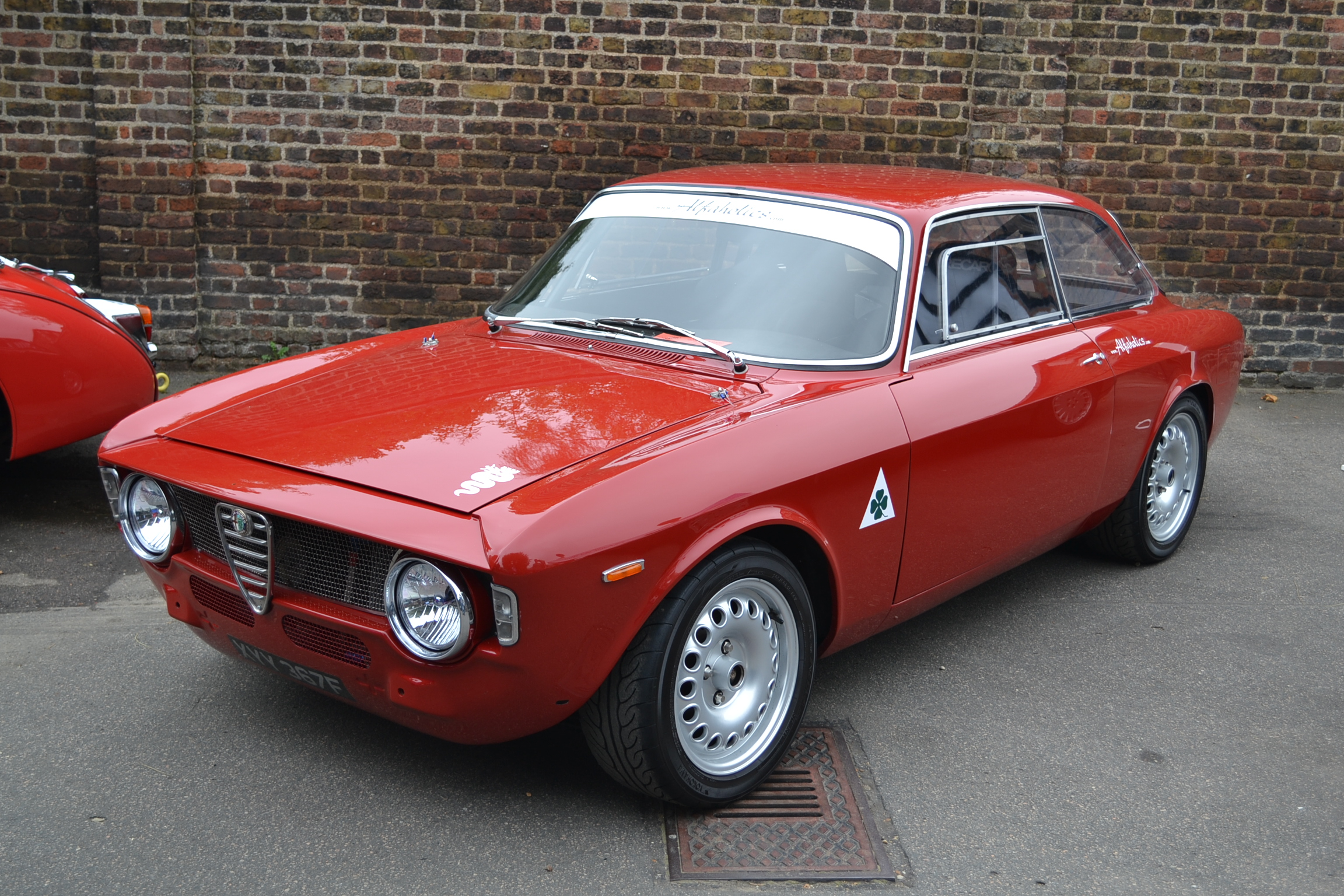
GTA (1965–1969)

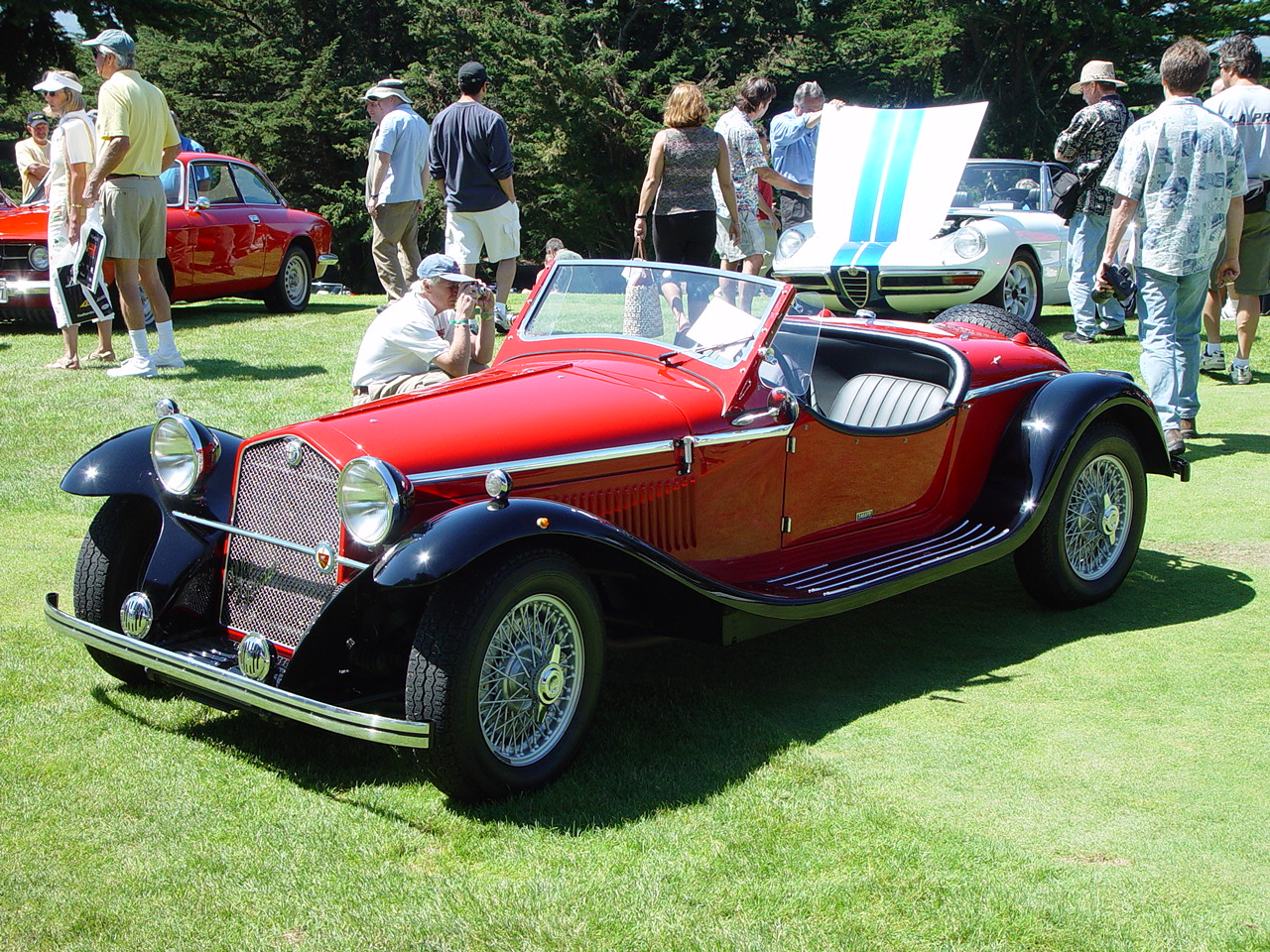
Gran Sport (1965–1967)

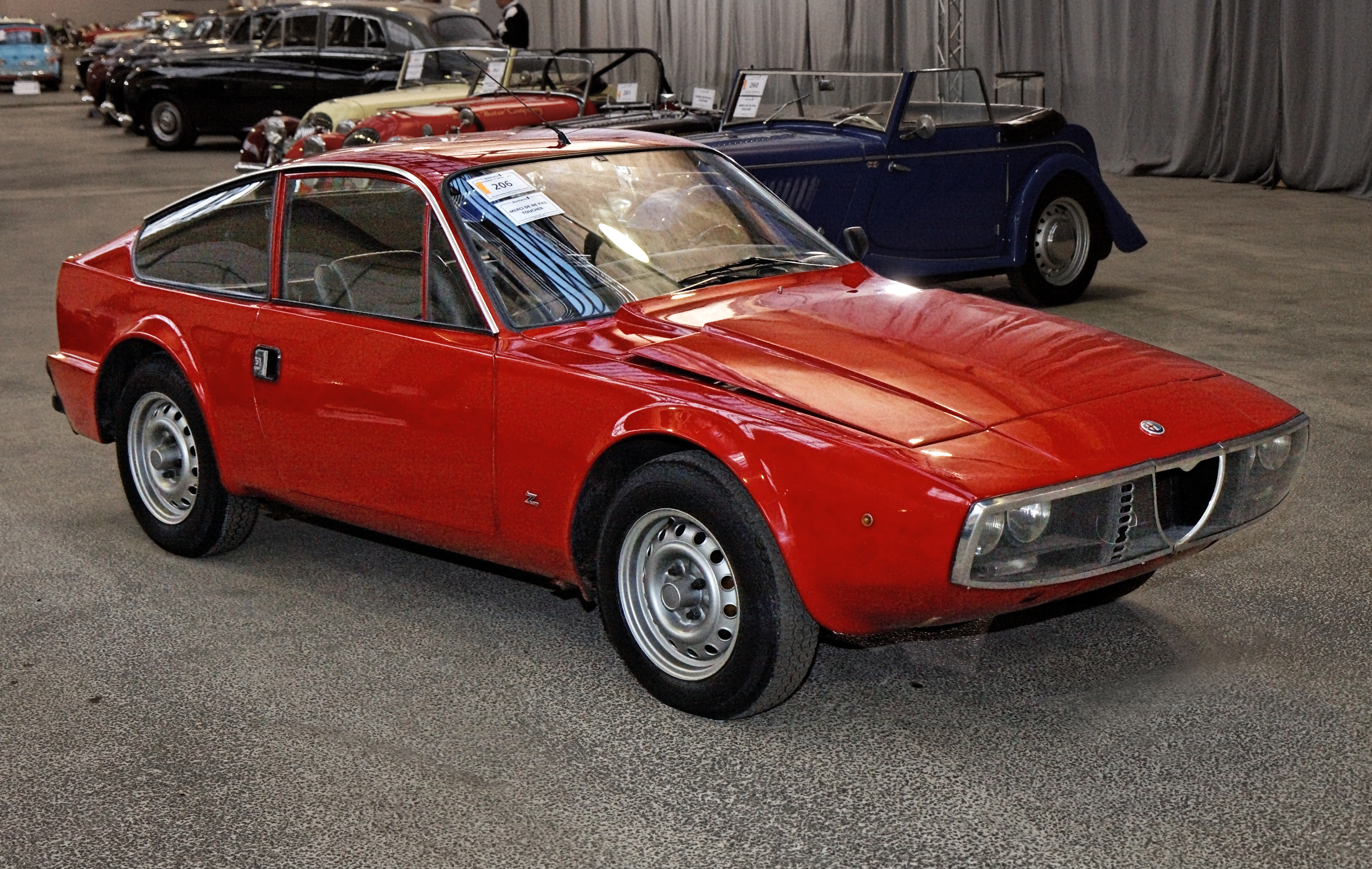
GT 1300 Junior Z (1965–1977)

Spider (1966–1993)

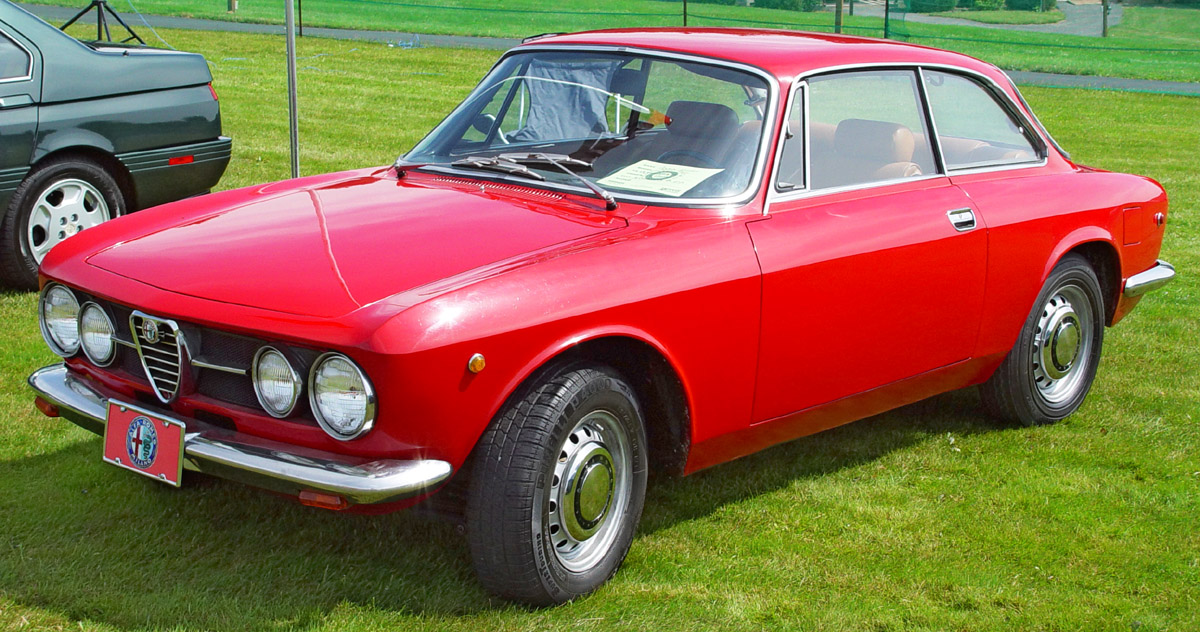
1750 GT Veloce (1967–1972)

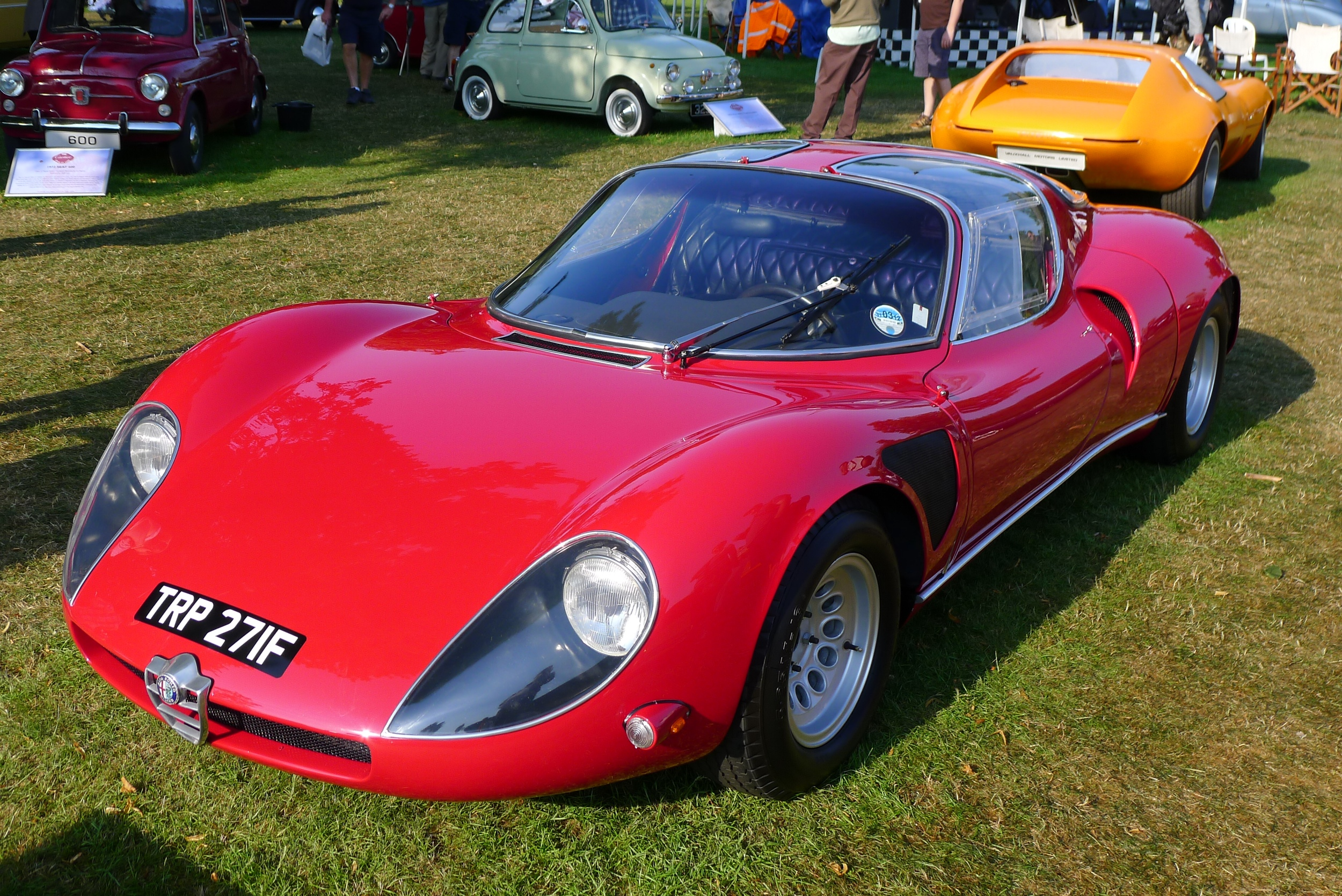
33 Stradale (1967–1969)

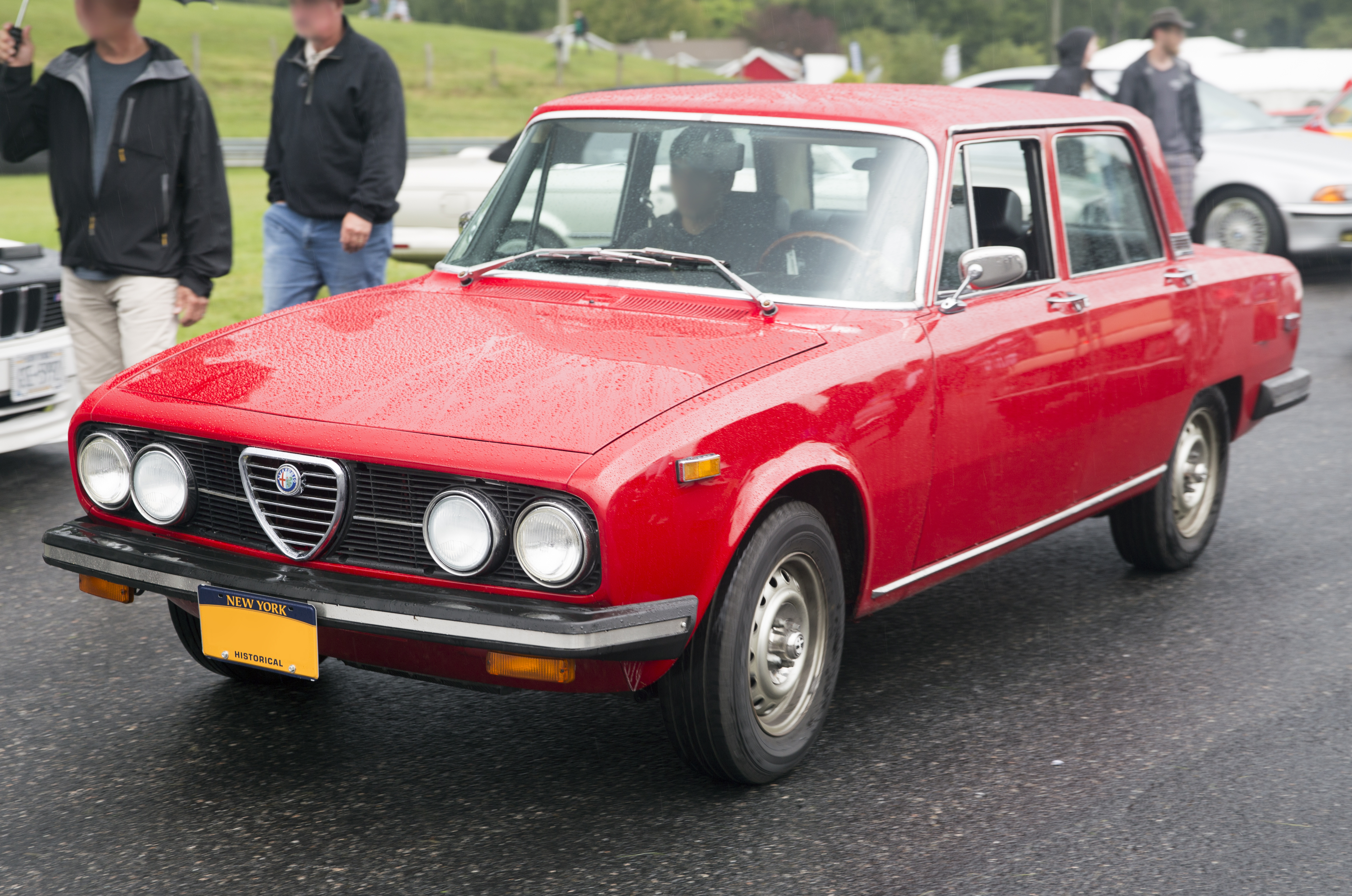
1750/2000 (1968–1977)

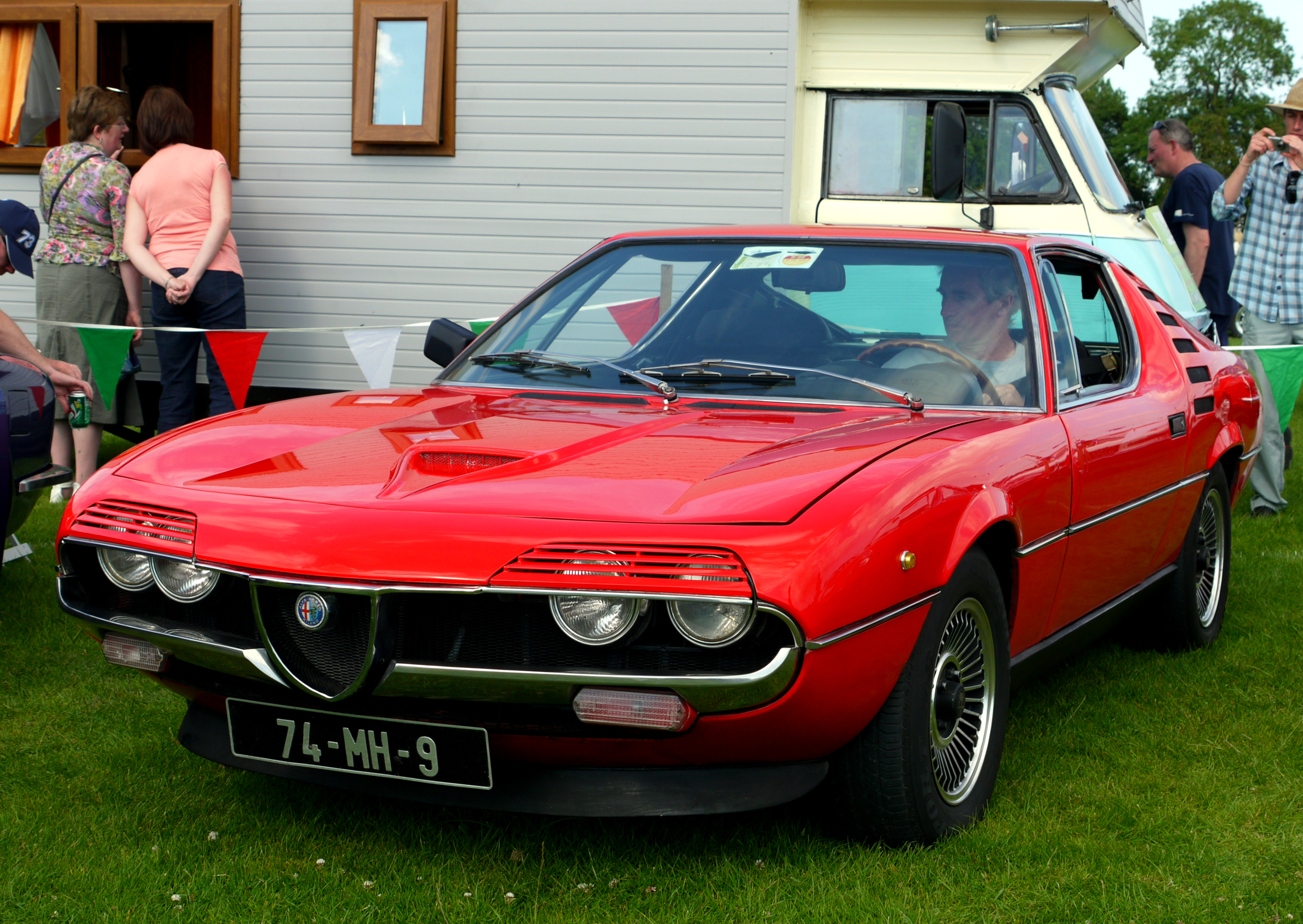
Montreal (1970–1977)

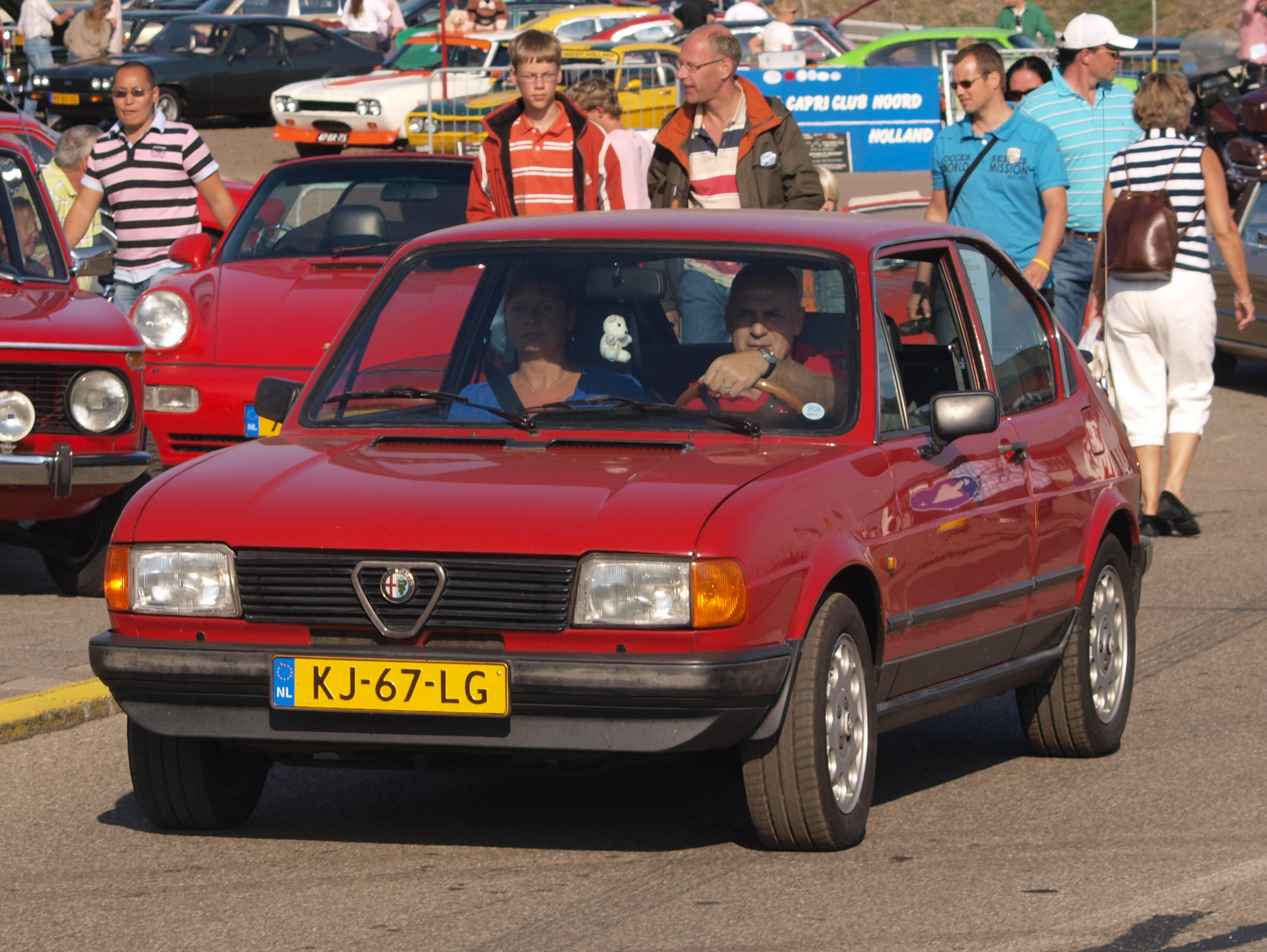
Alfasud (1971–1989)

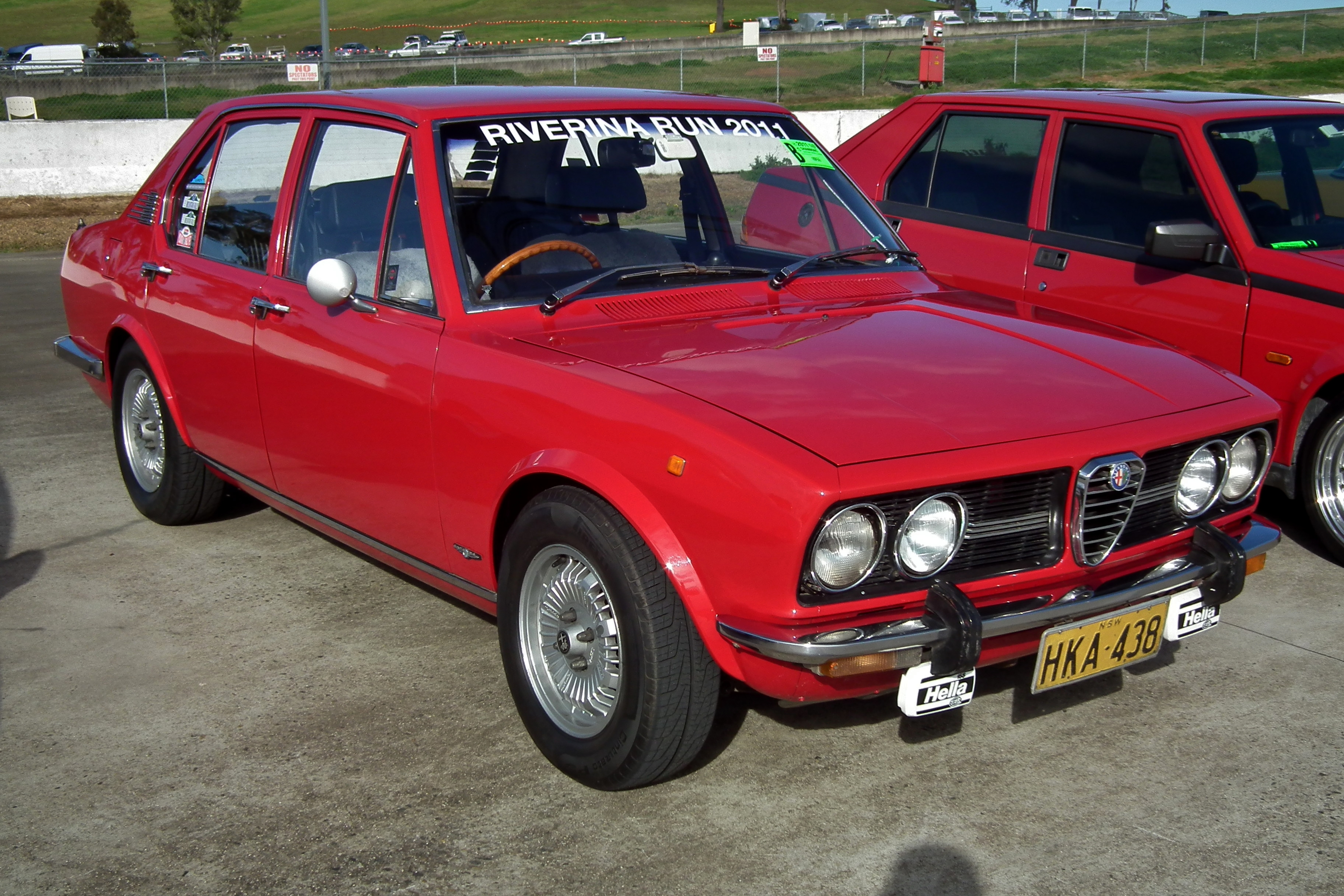
Alfetta (1972–1987)

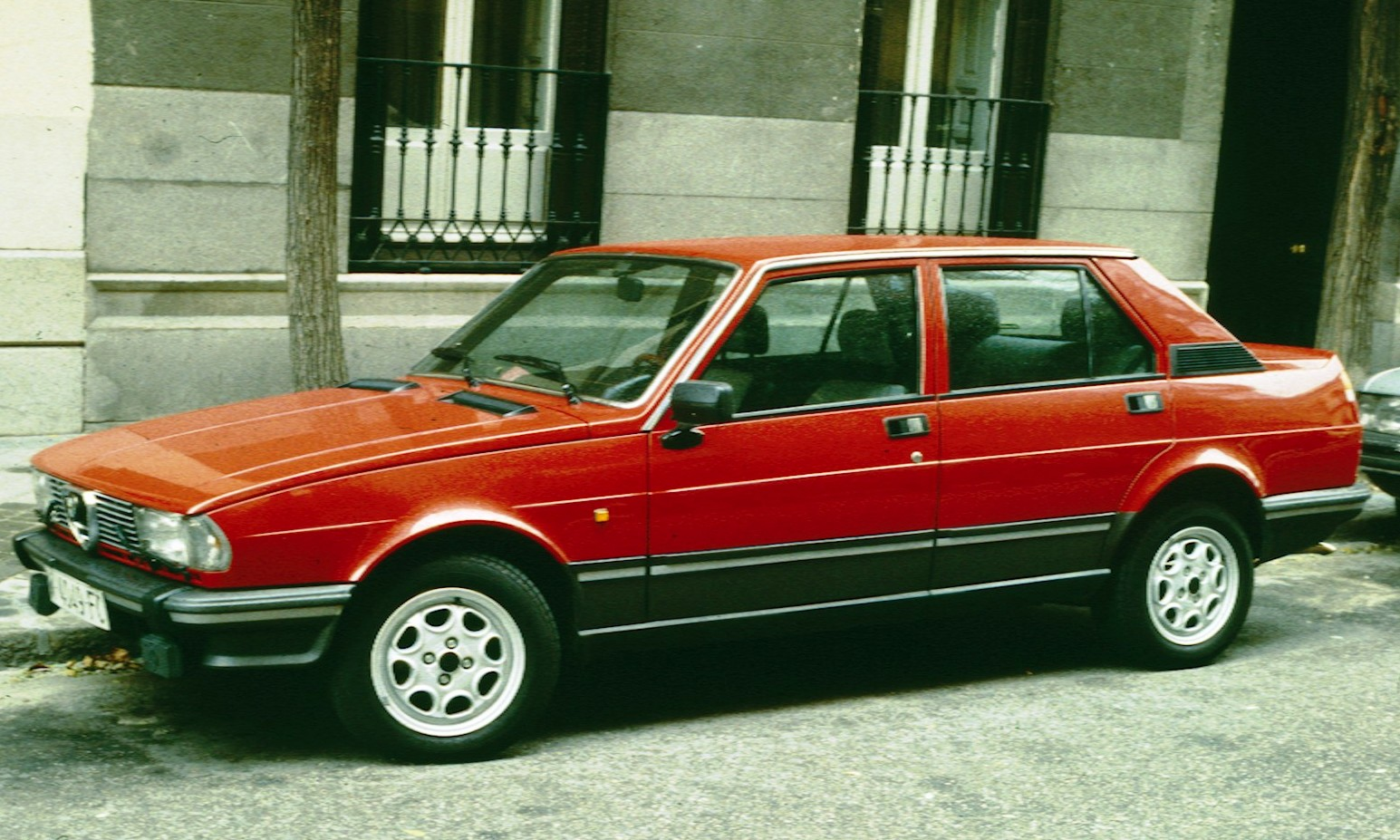
Giulietta (1977–1985)

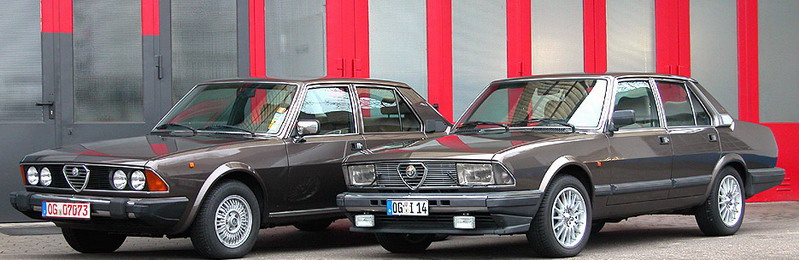
Alfa 6 (1979–1986)

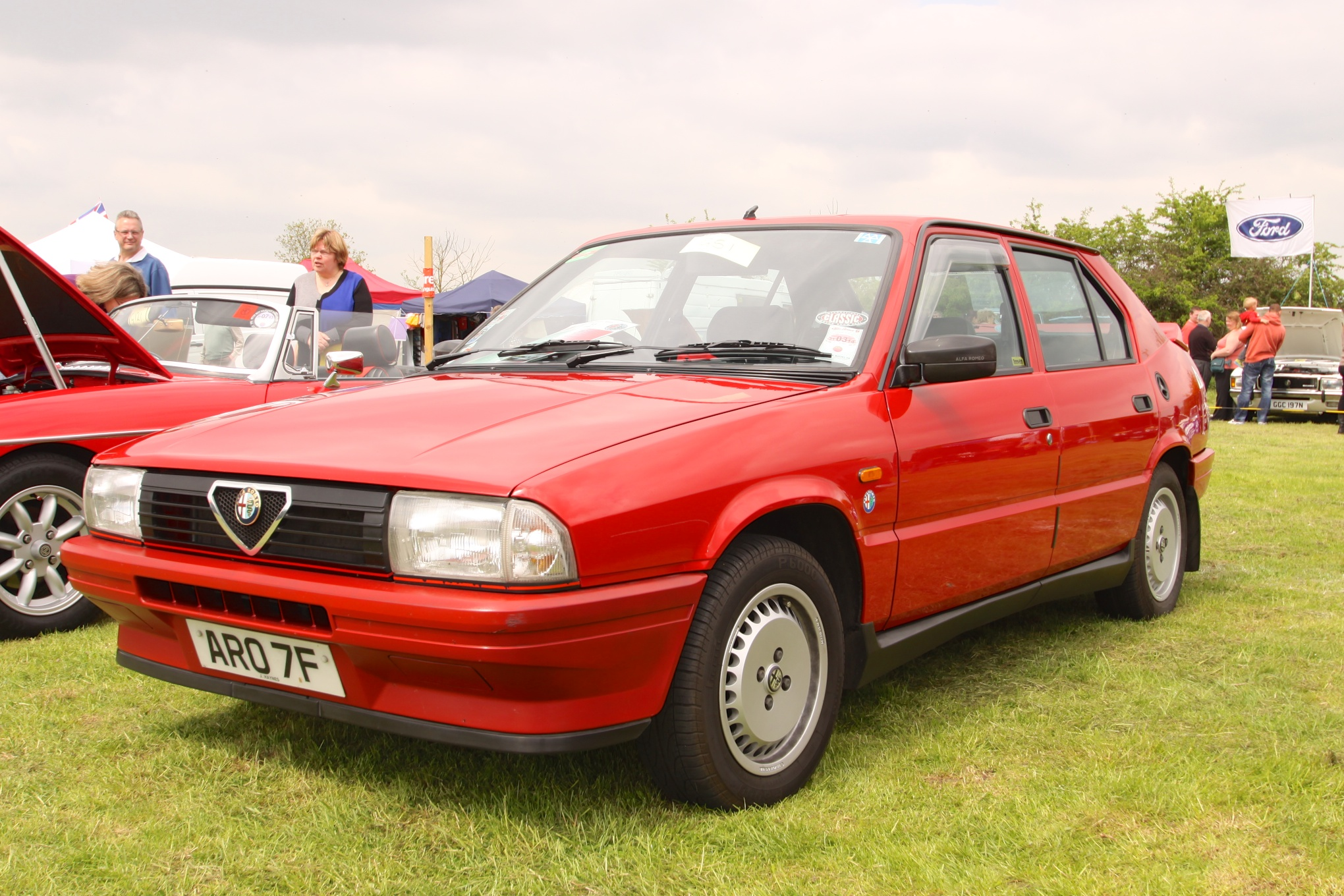
33 (1983–1995)

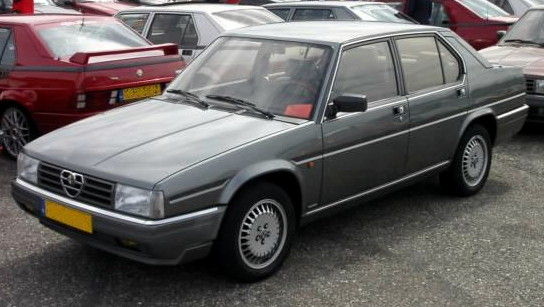
90 (1984–1987)

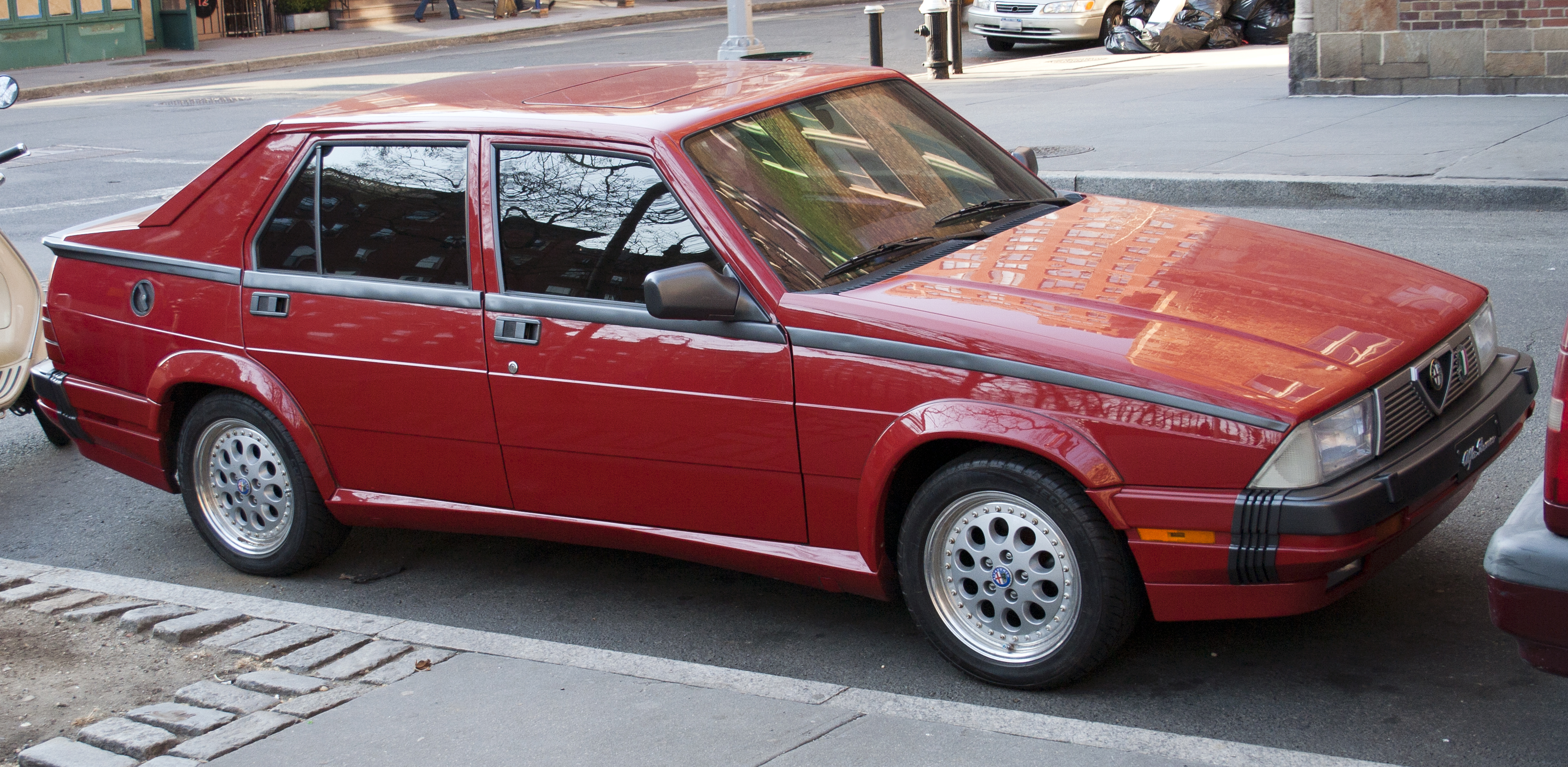
75 (1985–1992)

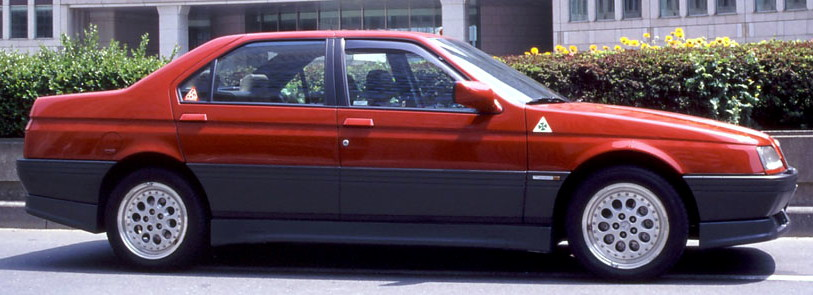
164 (1987–1998)

SZ (1989–1991)

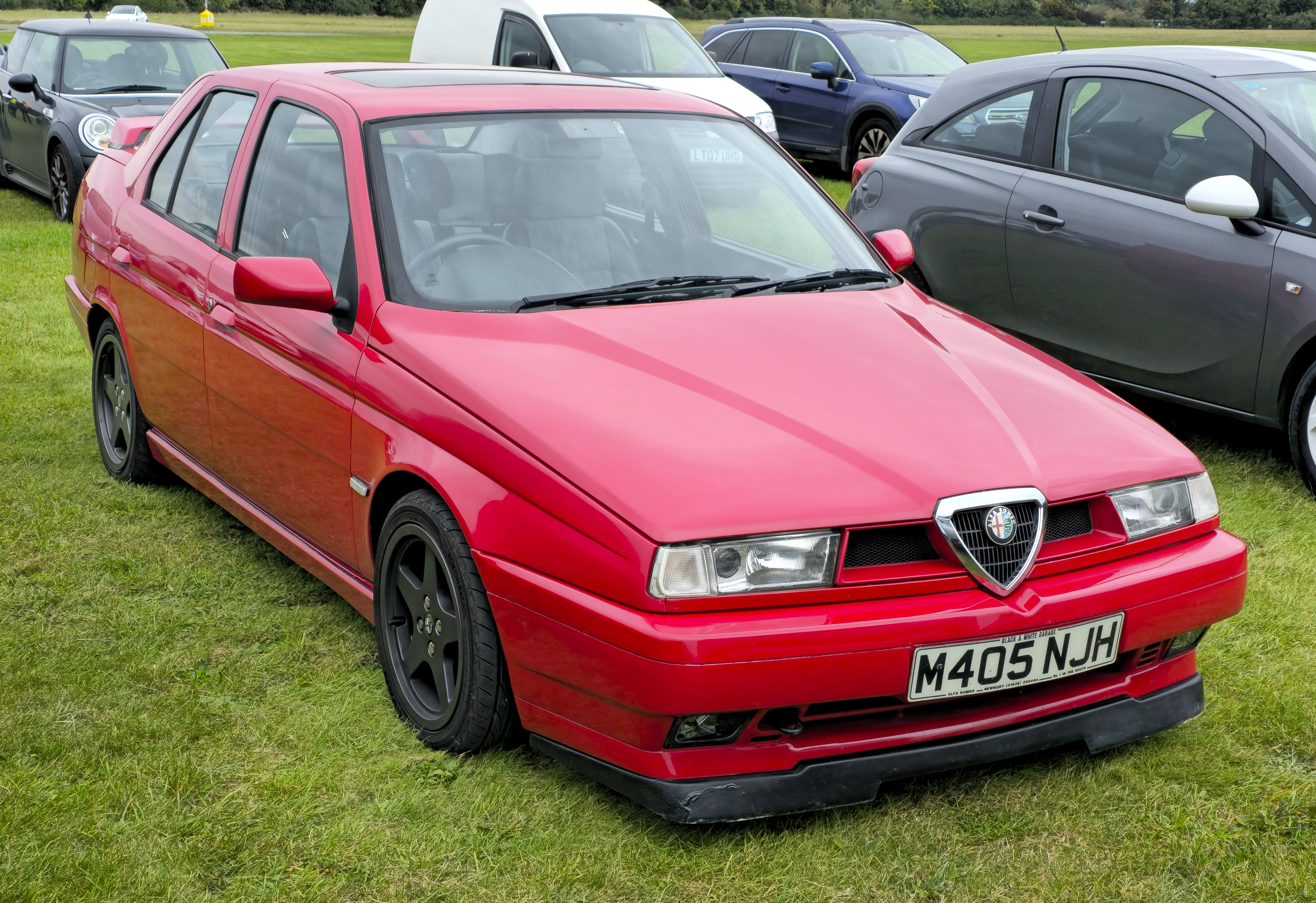
155 (1992–1998)

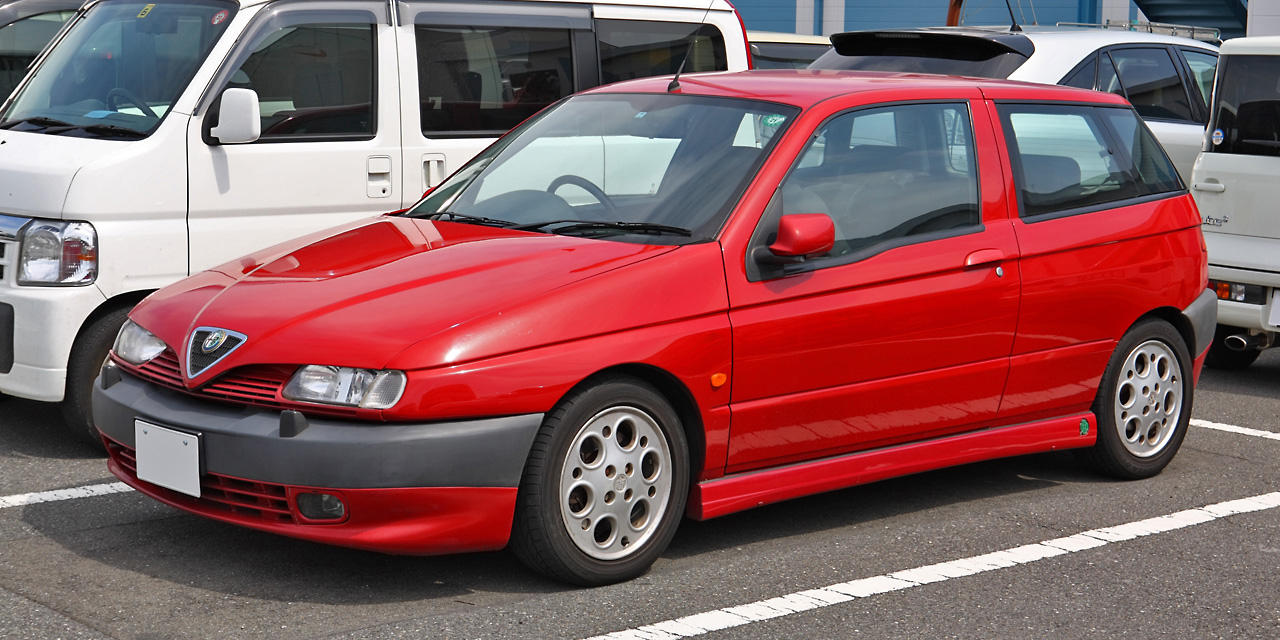
145 (1994–2000)

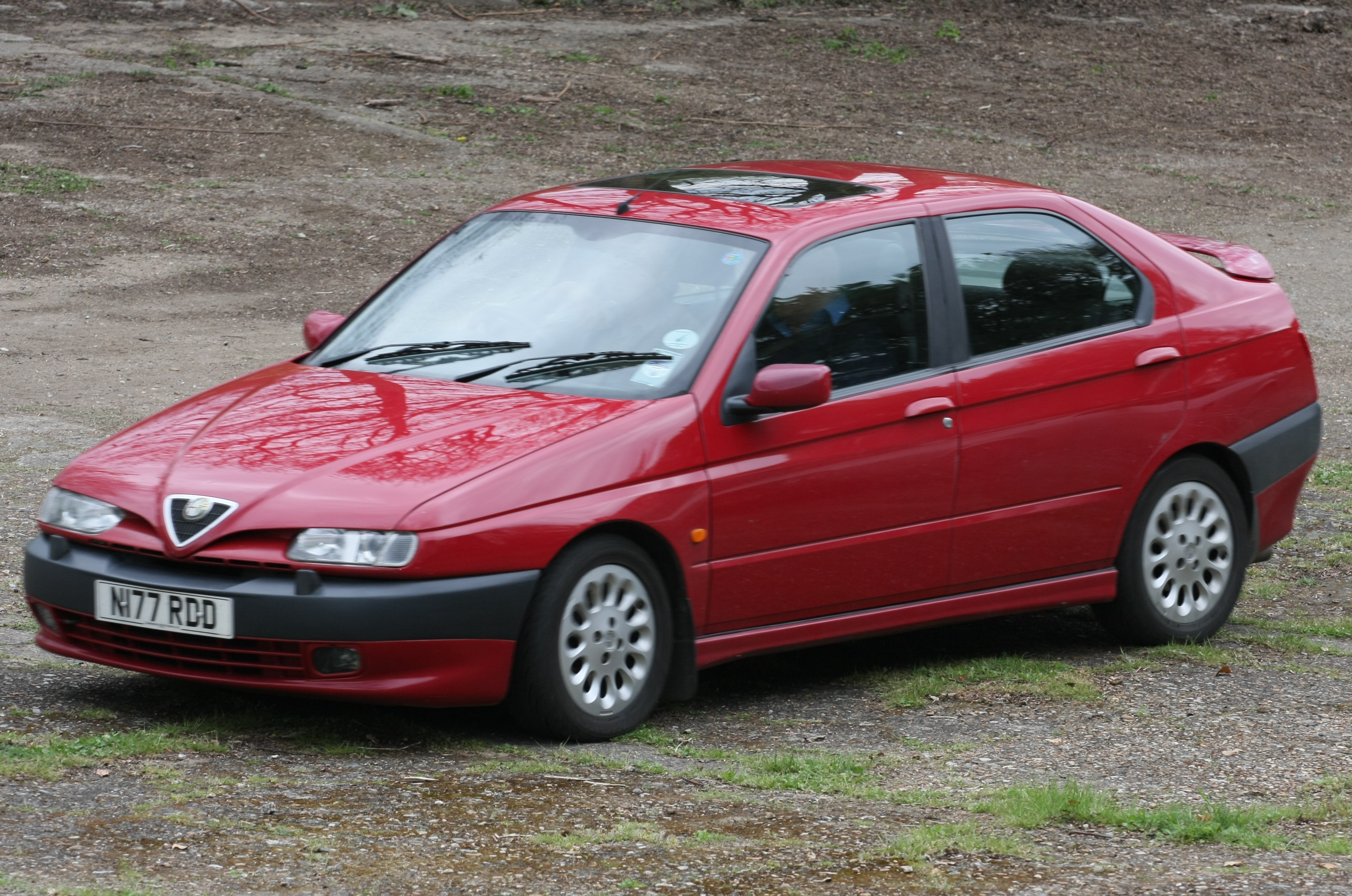
146 (1995–2000)

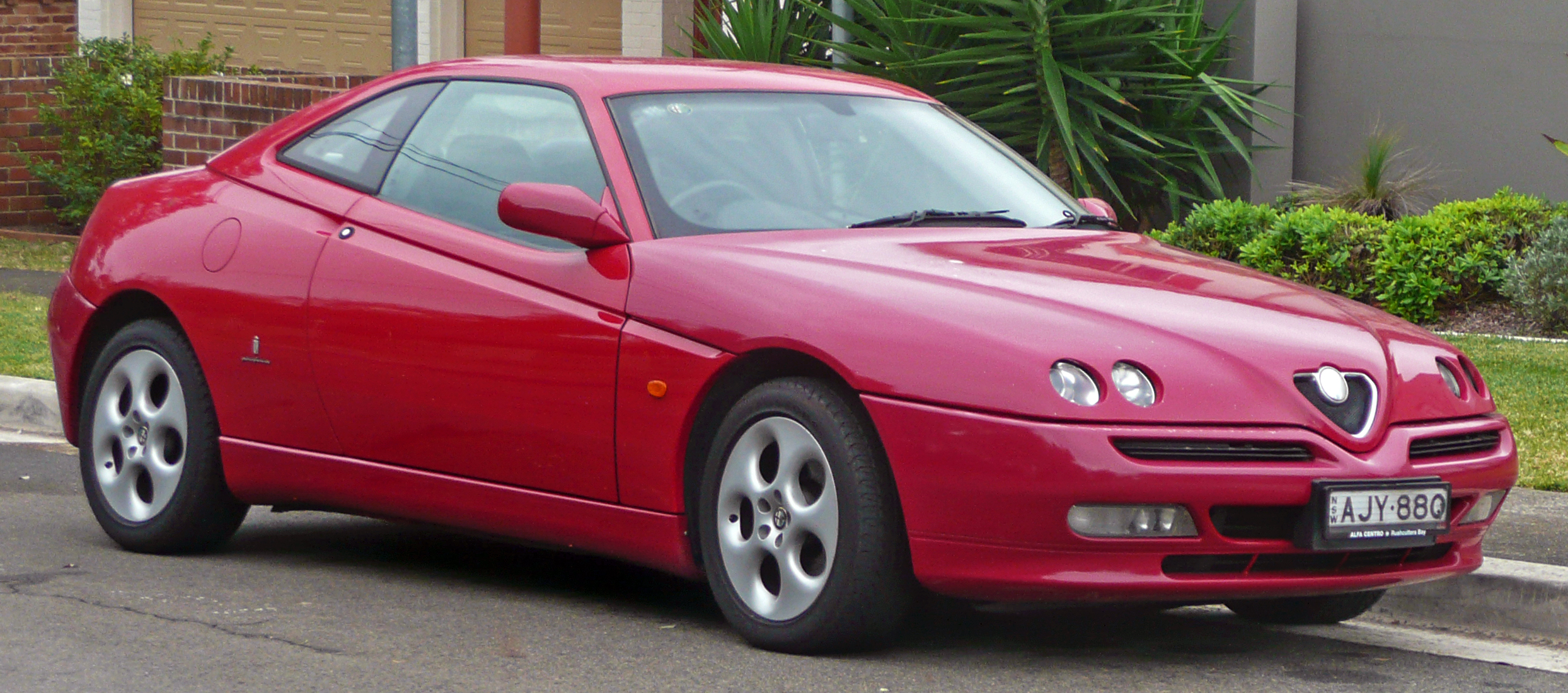
GTV (1994–2004)

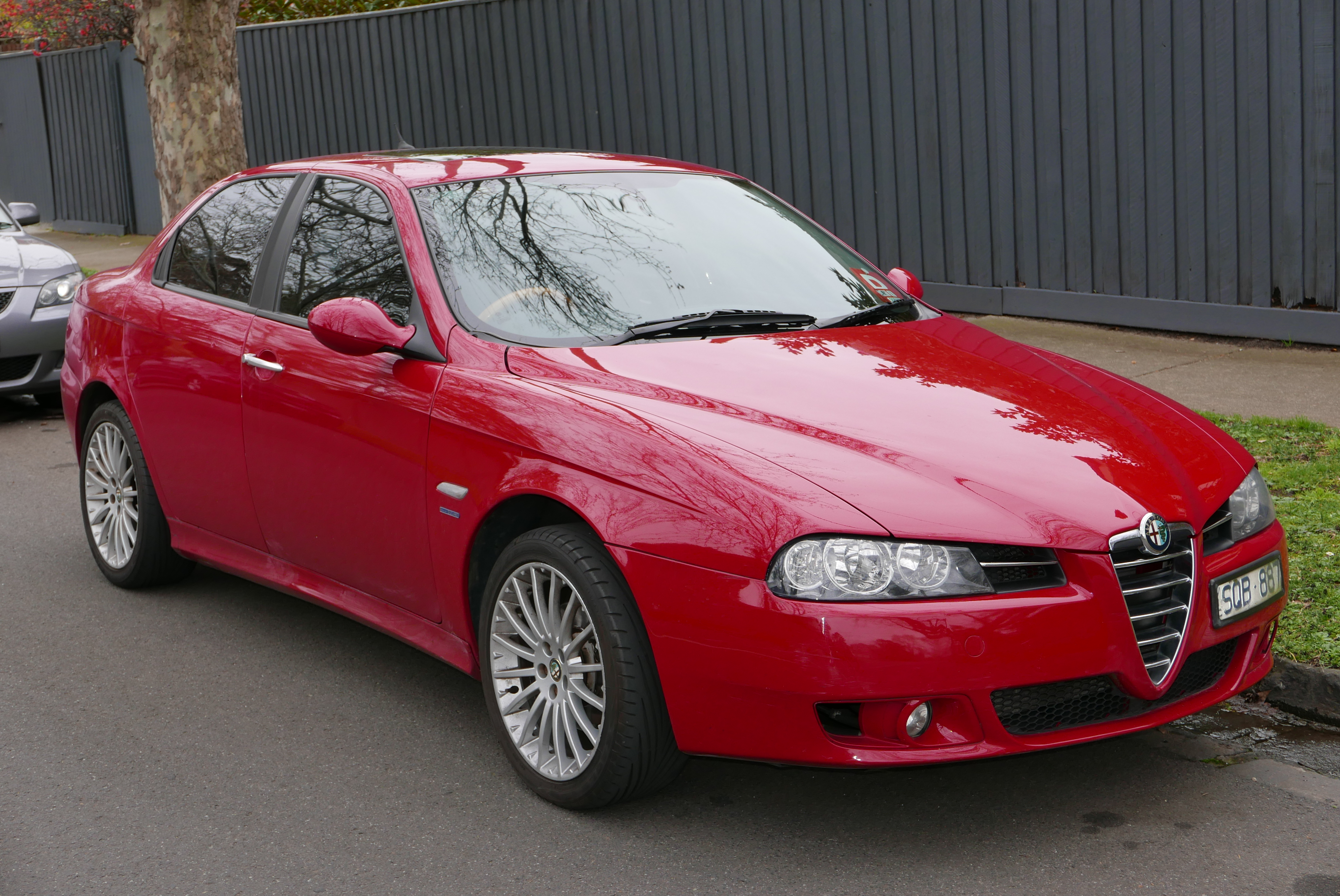
156 (1996–2005)

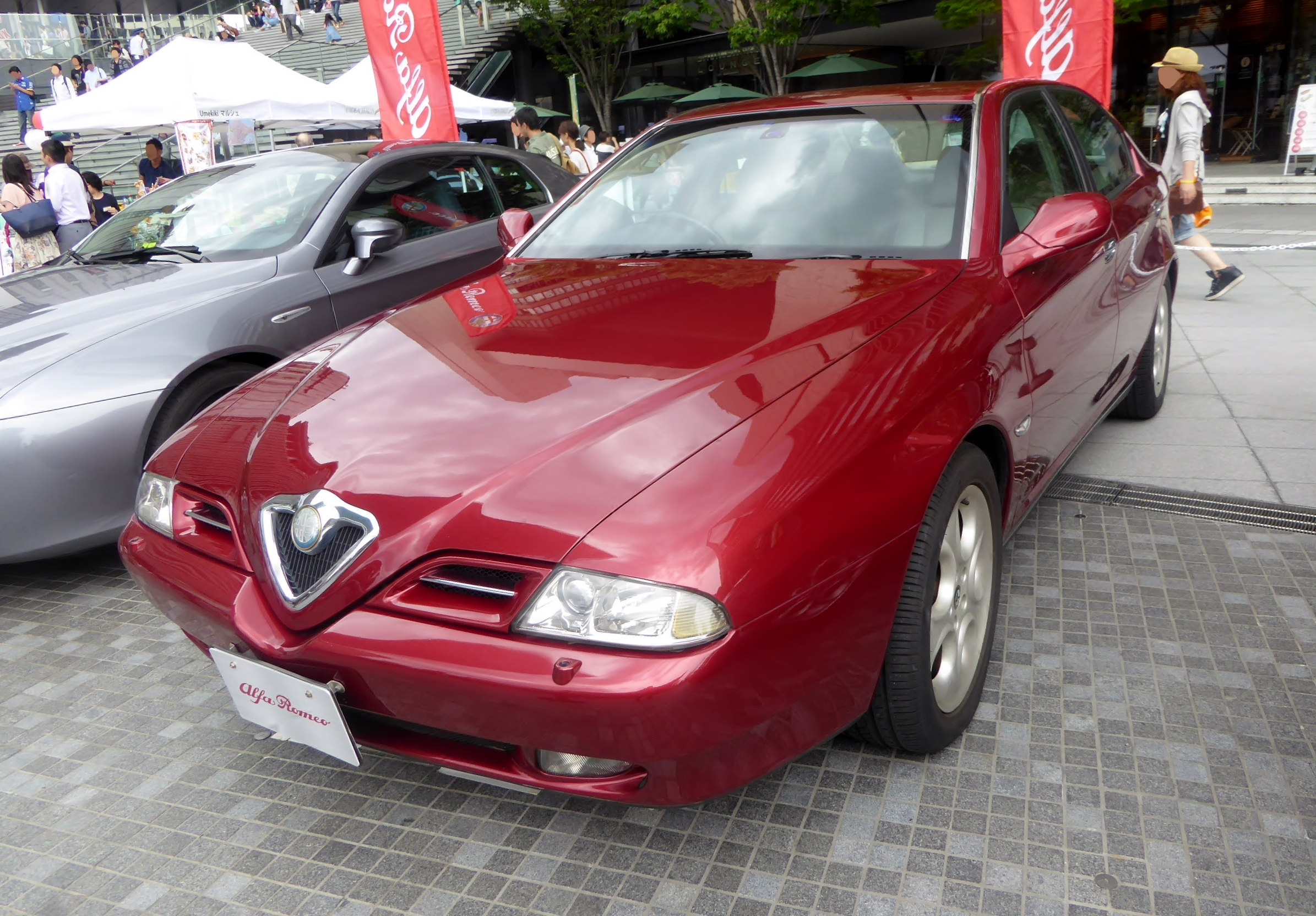
166 (1996–2007)

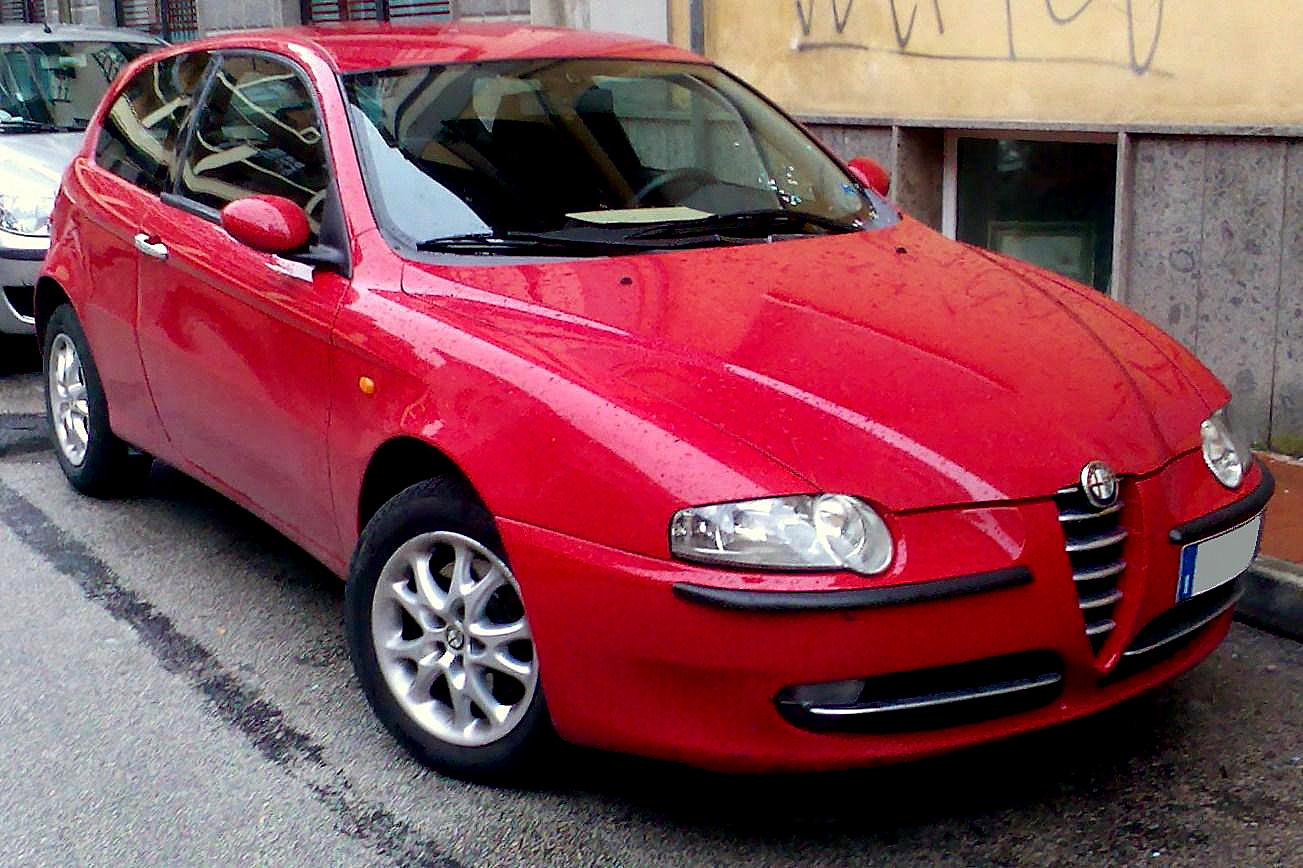
147 (2000–2010)

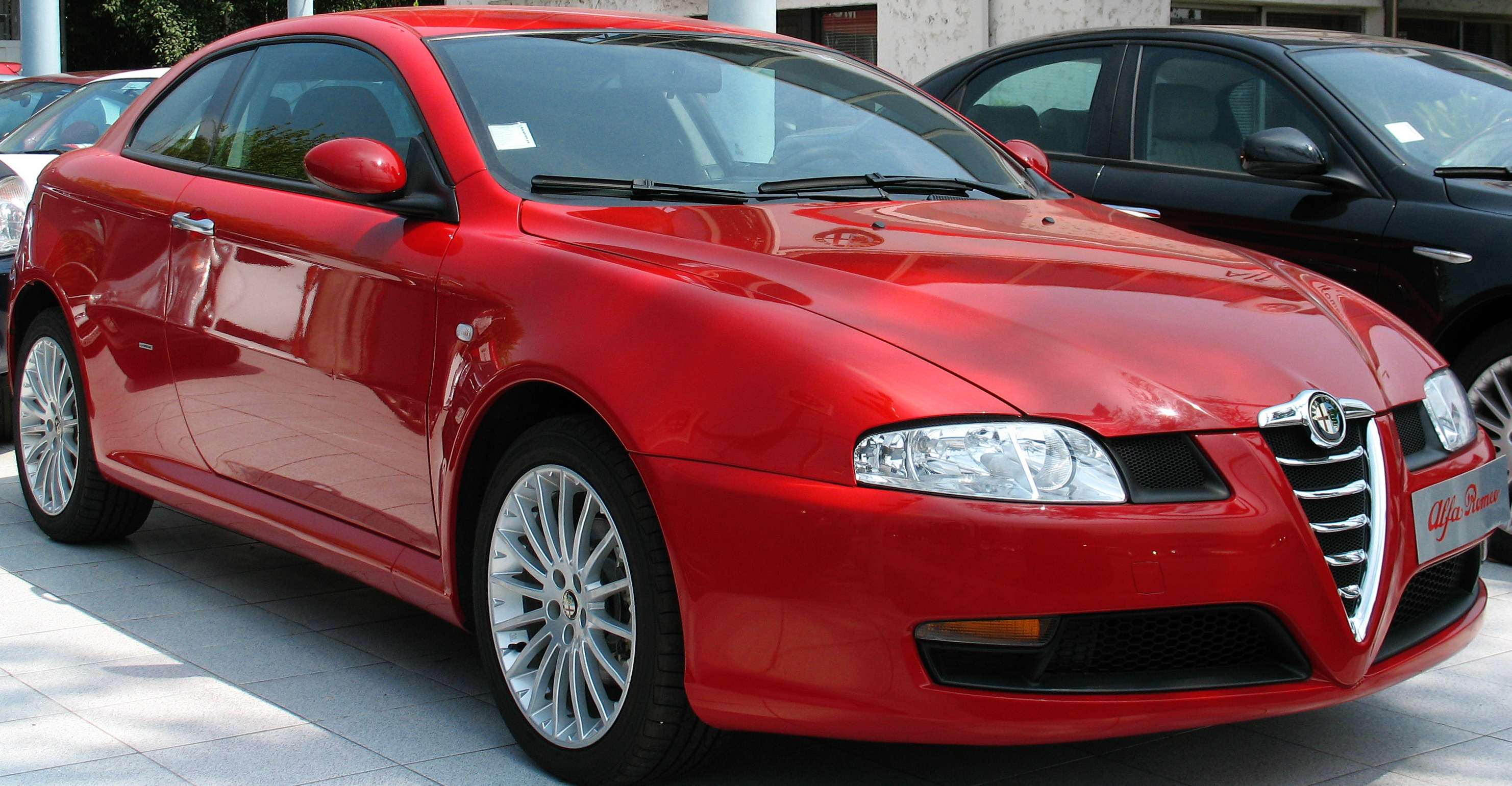
GT (2003–2010)

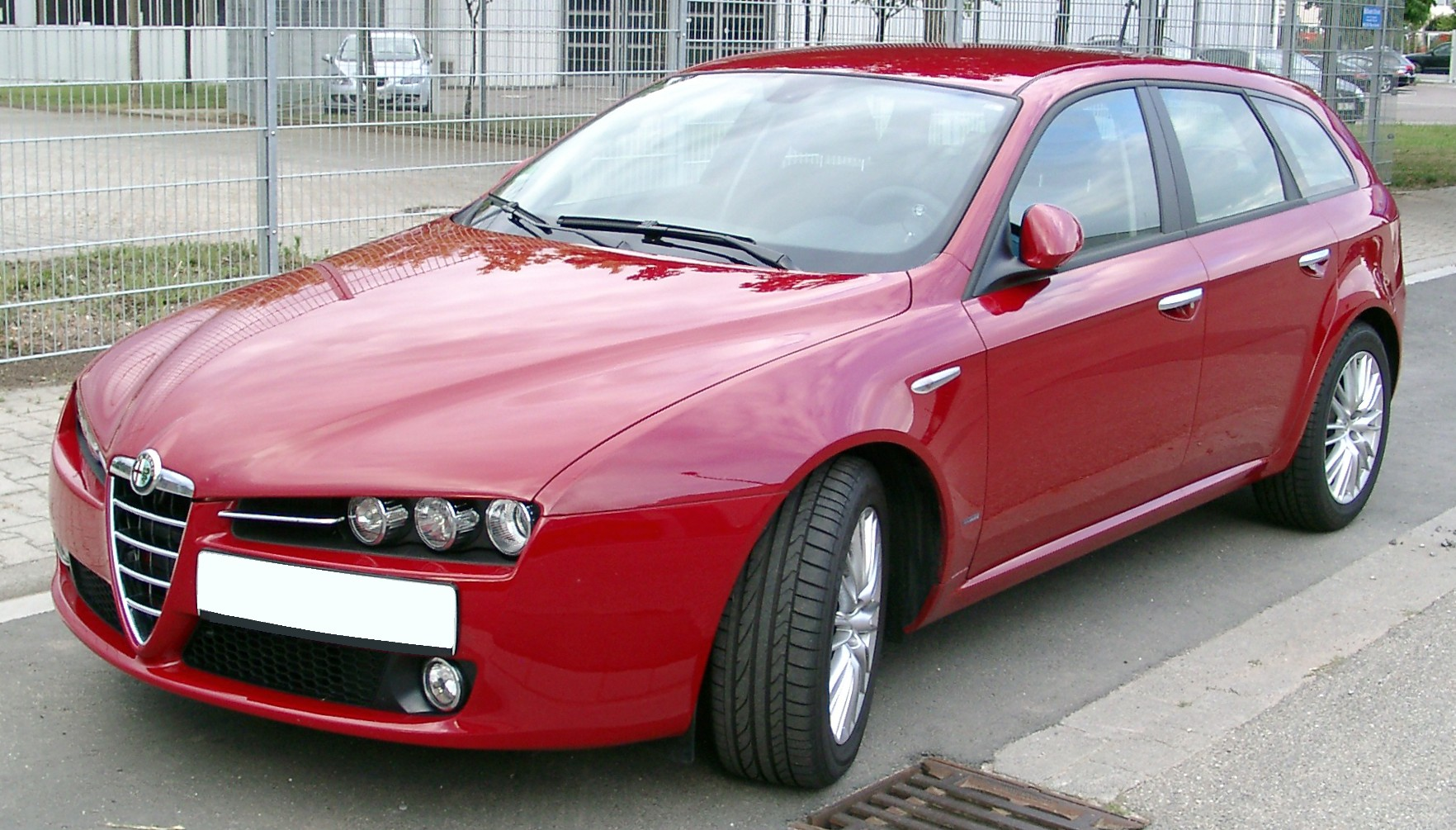
159 (2004–2011)

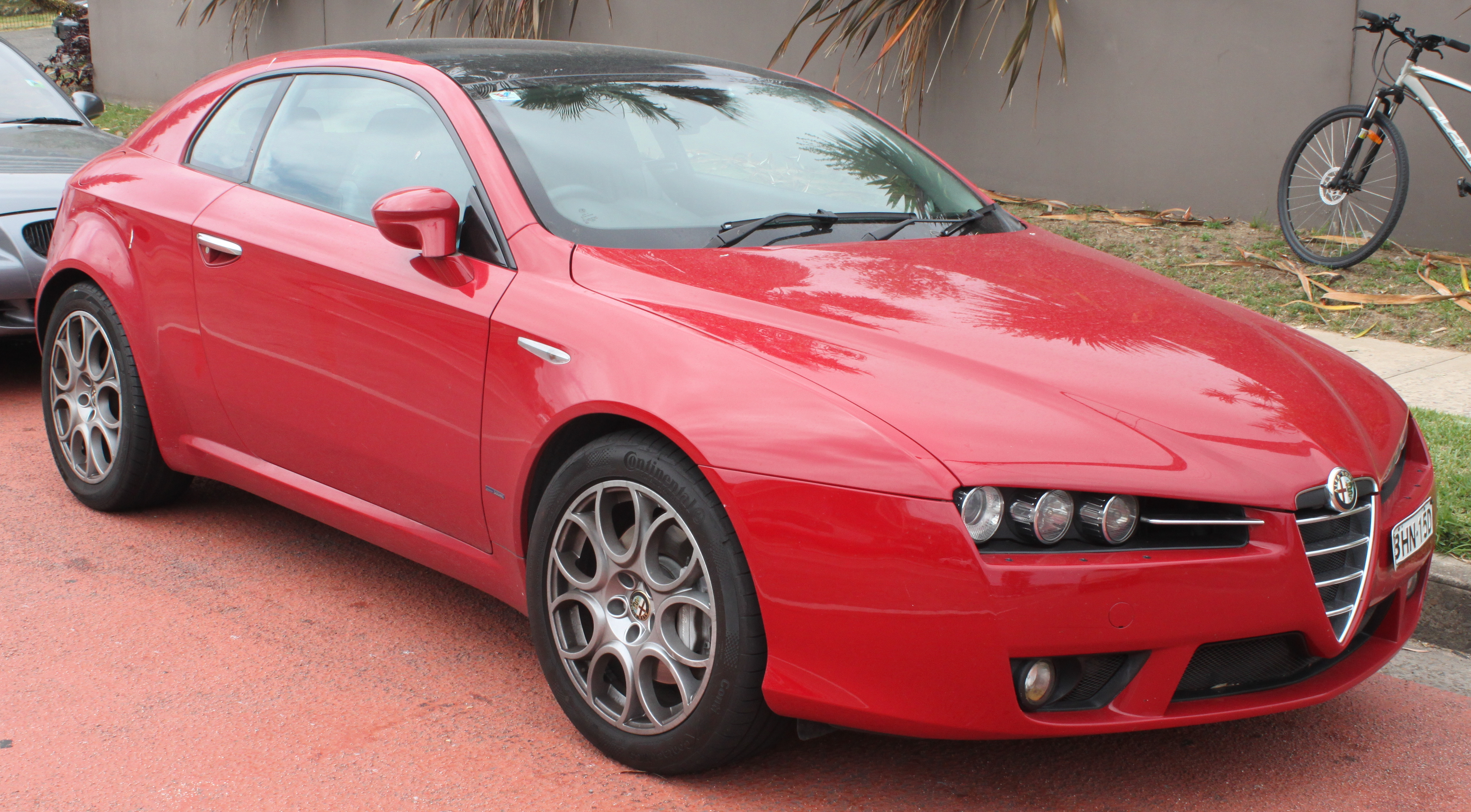
Brera (2005–2010)

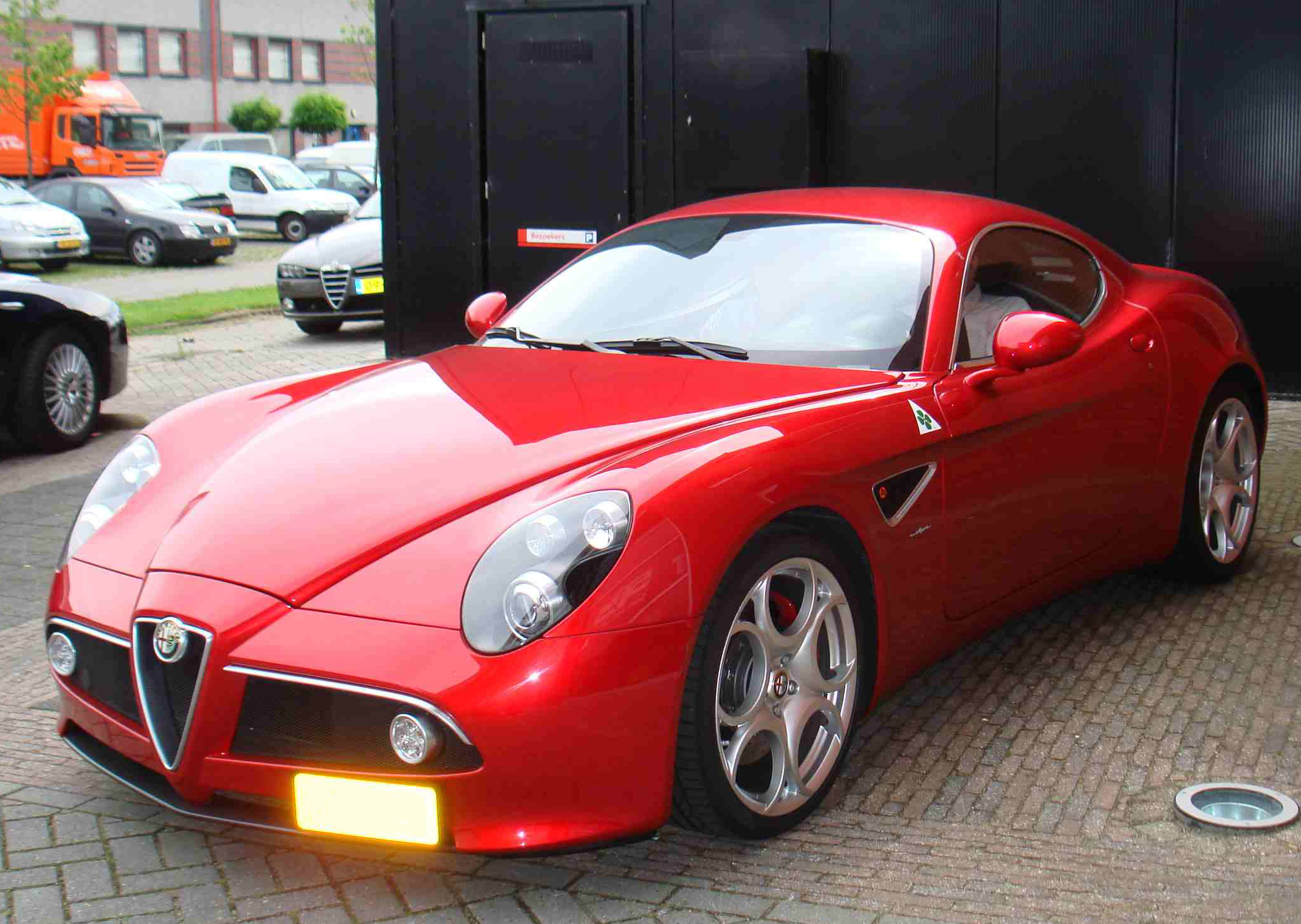
8C Competizione (2007–2010)

MiTo (2008–2018)

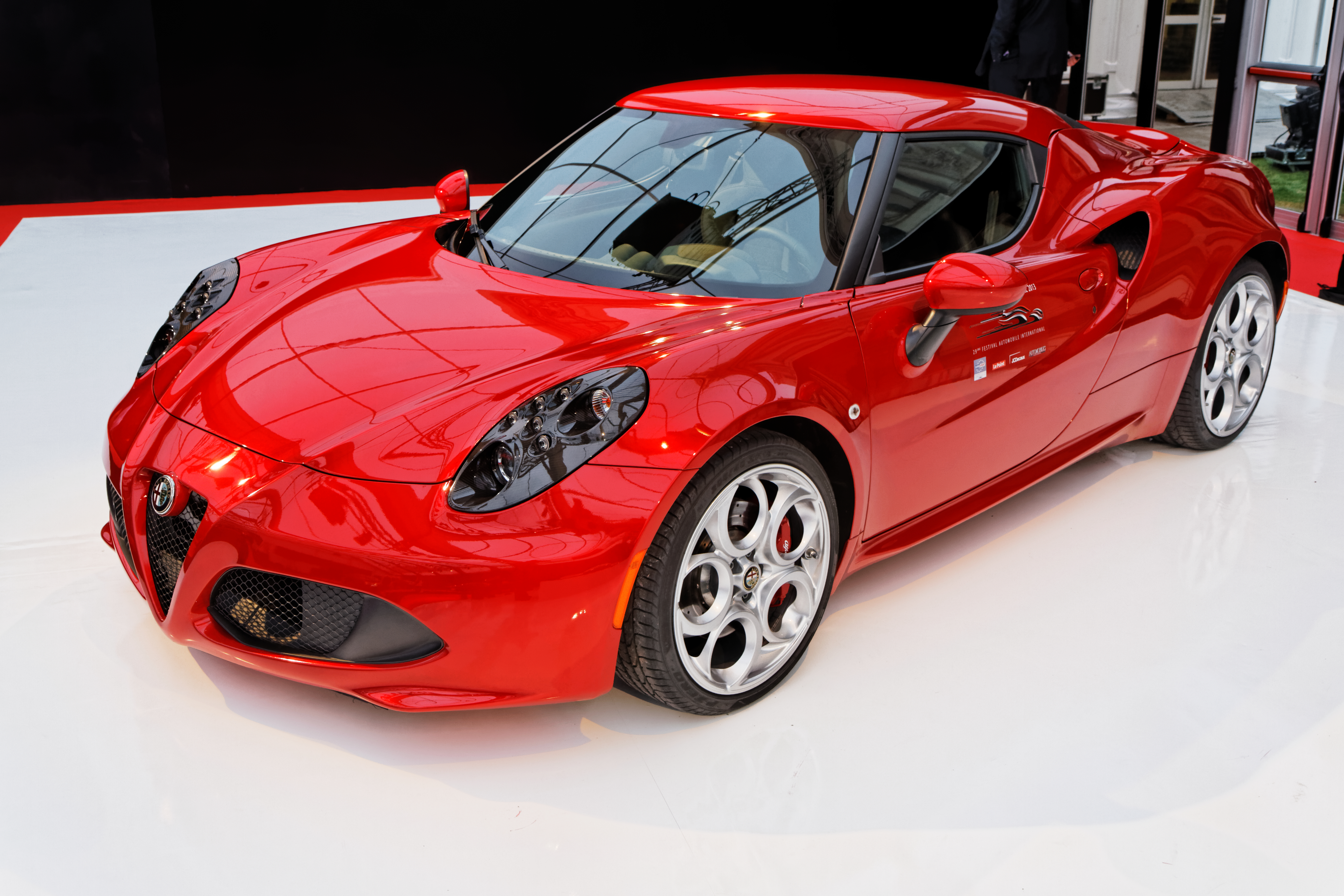
4C (2013–2020)

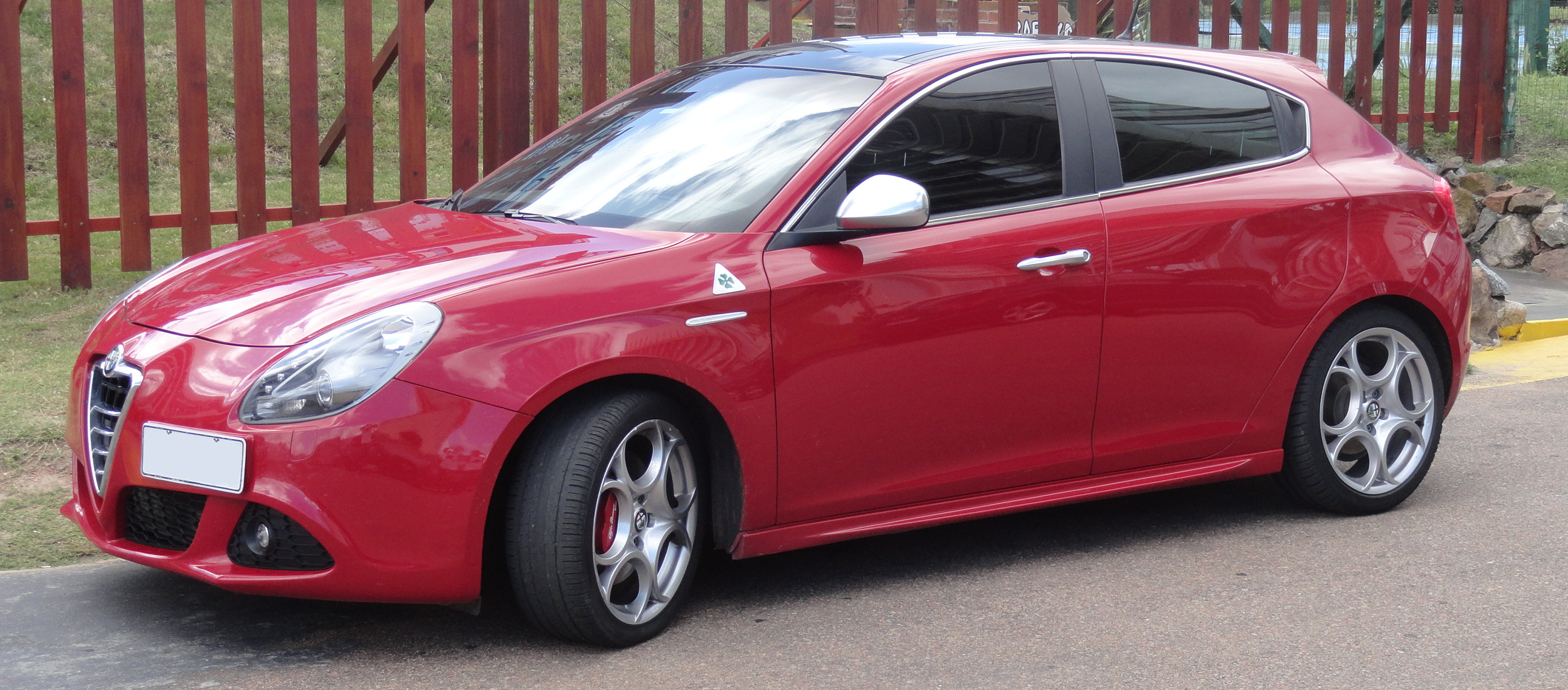
Giulietta (2010–2020)

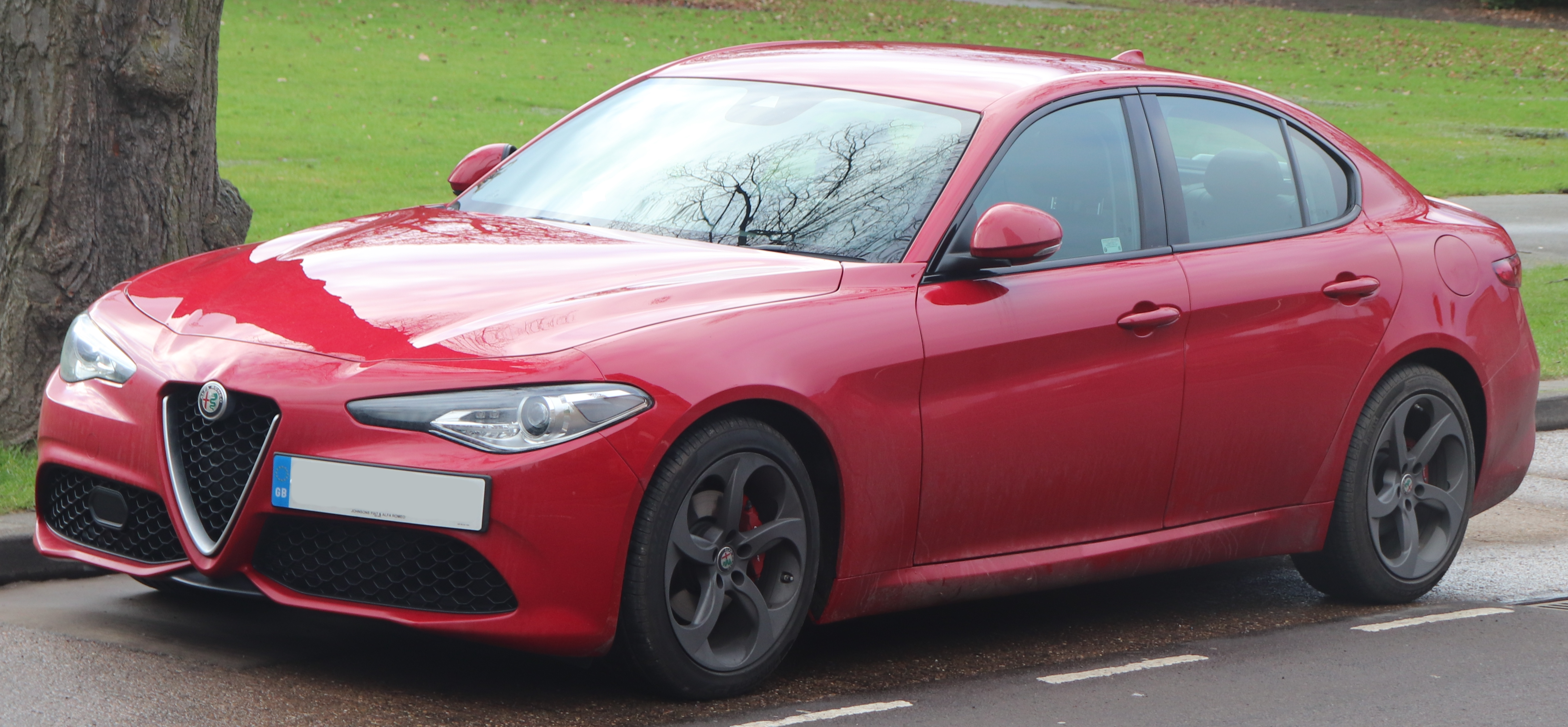
Giulia (2016–present)

Stelvio (2017–present)

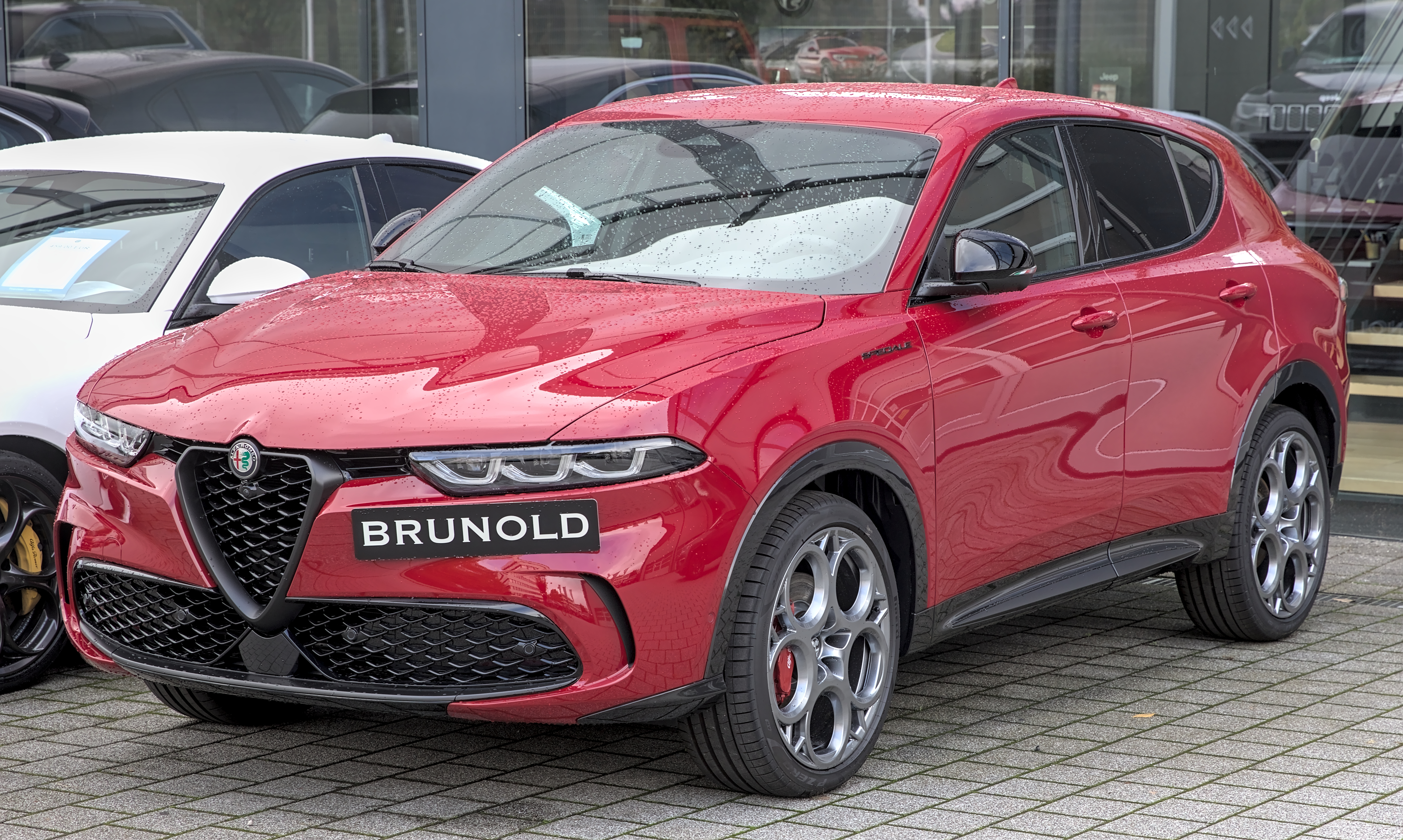
Tonale (2022–present)

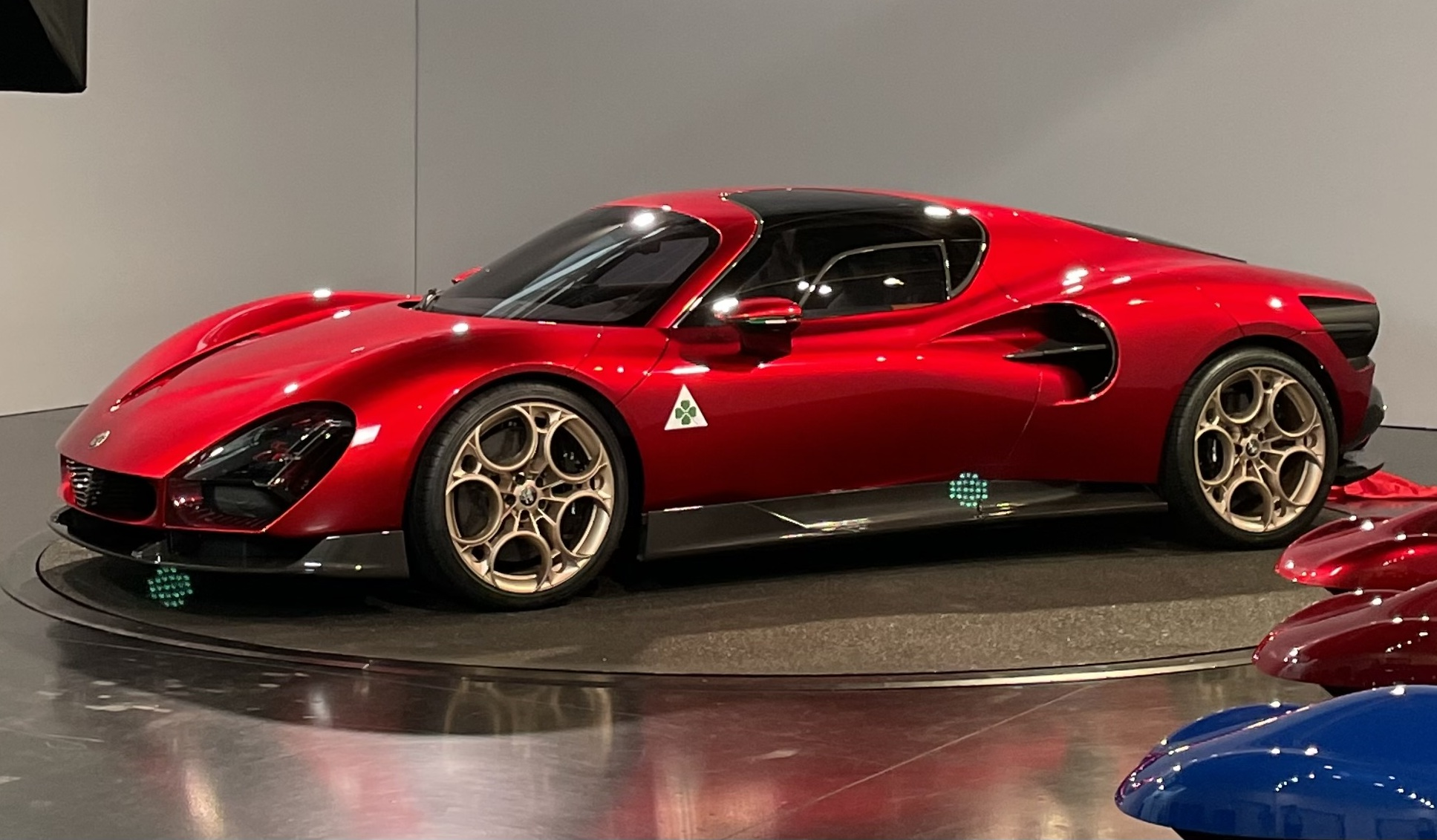
33 Stradale (2024–present)

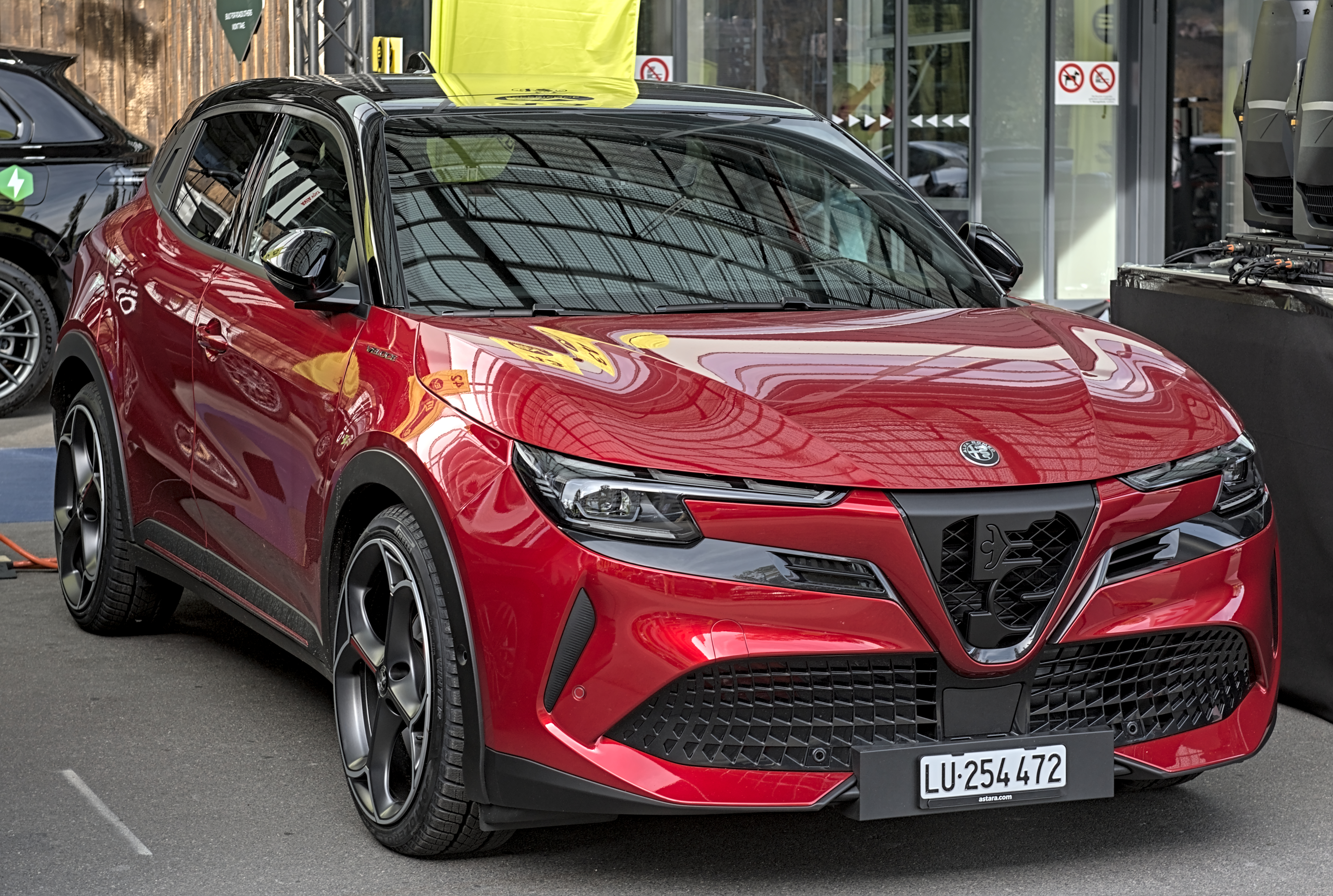
Junior (2024–present)

=== Historic models ===
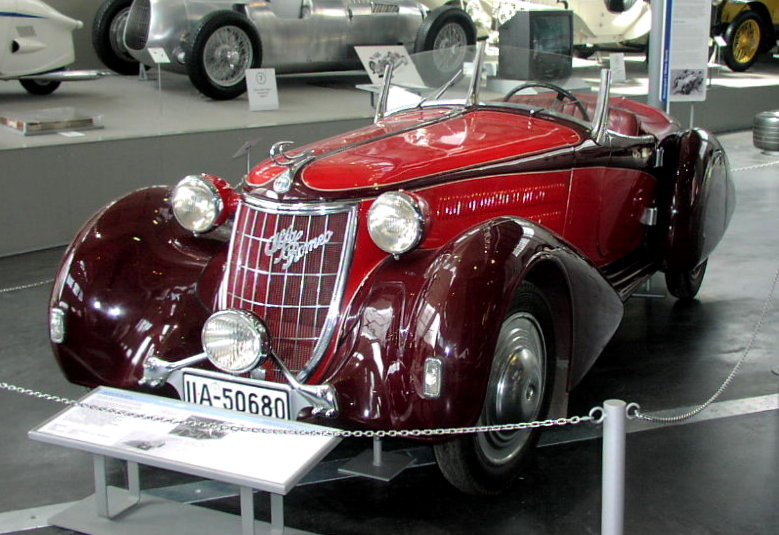
6C Gran Sport (1931)

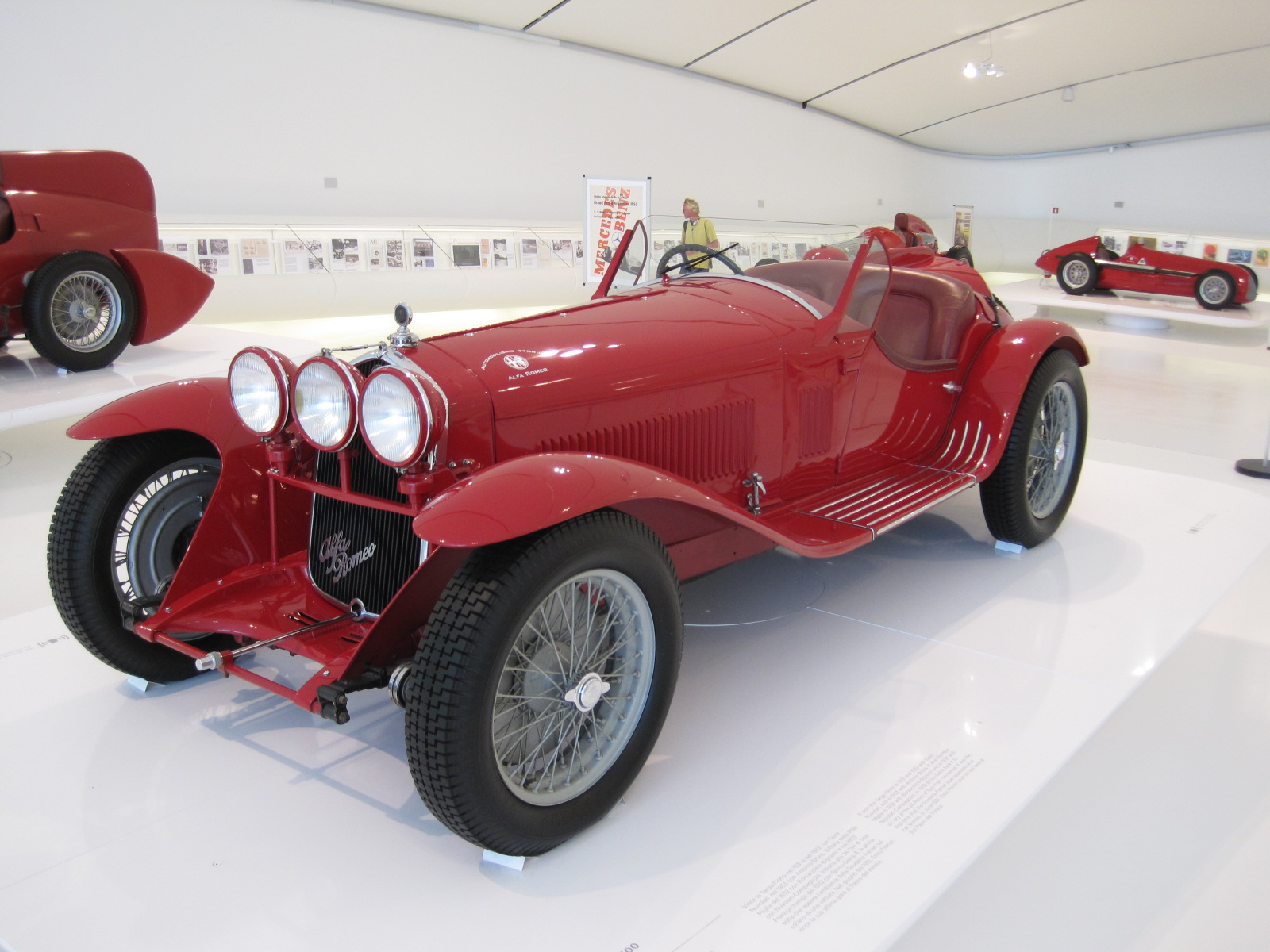
8C 2300 (1931)

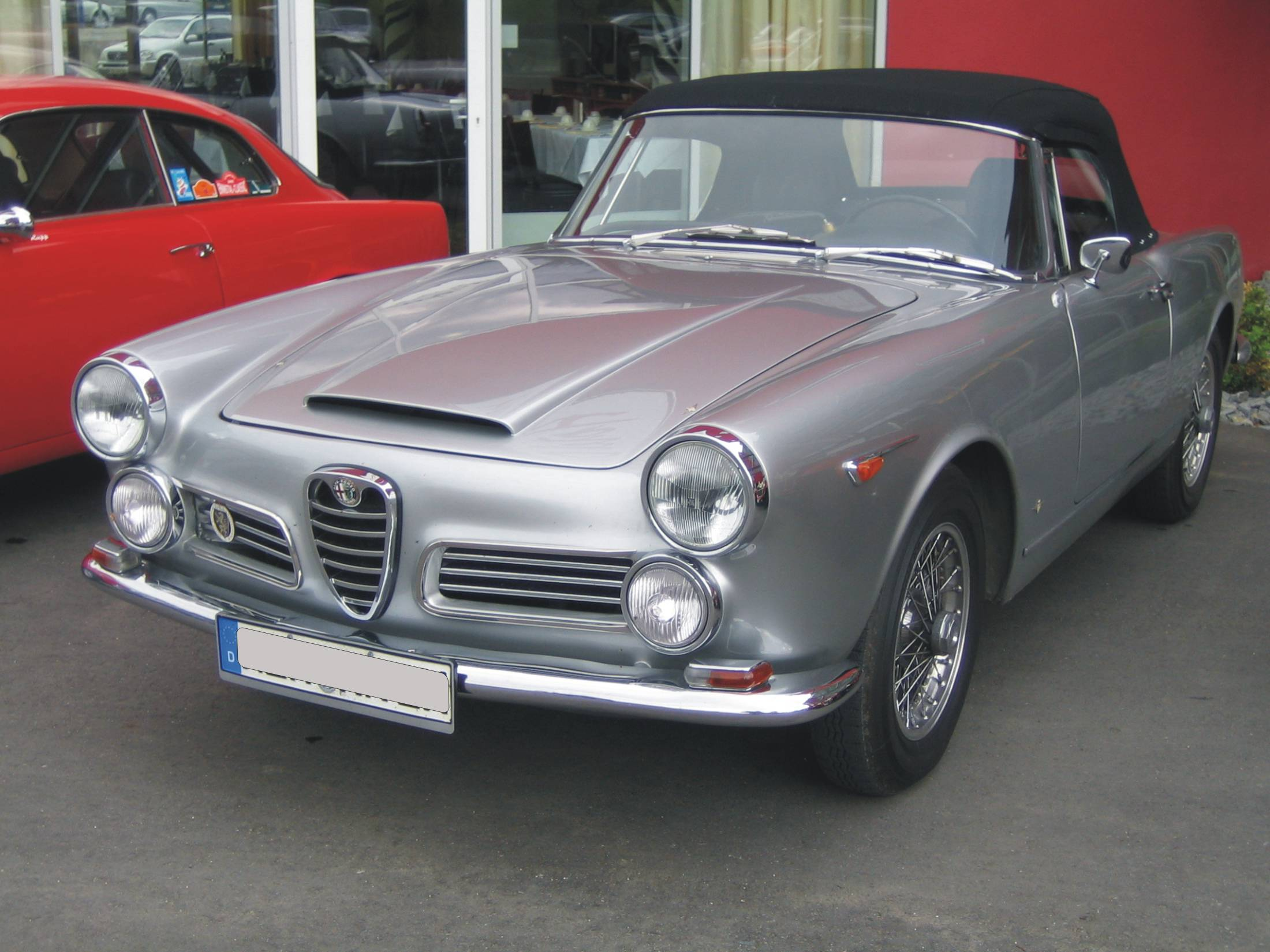
2600 Touring Spider (1961)

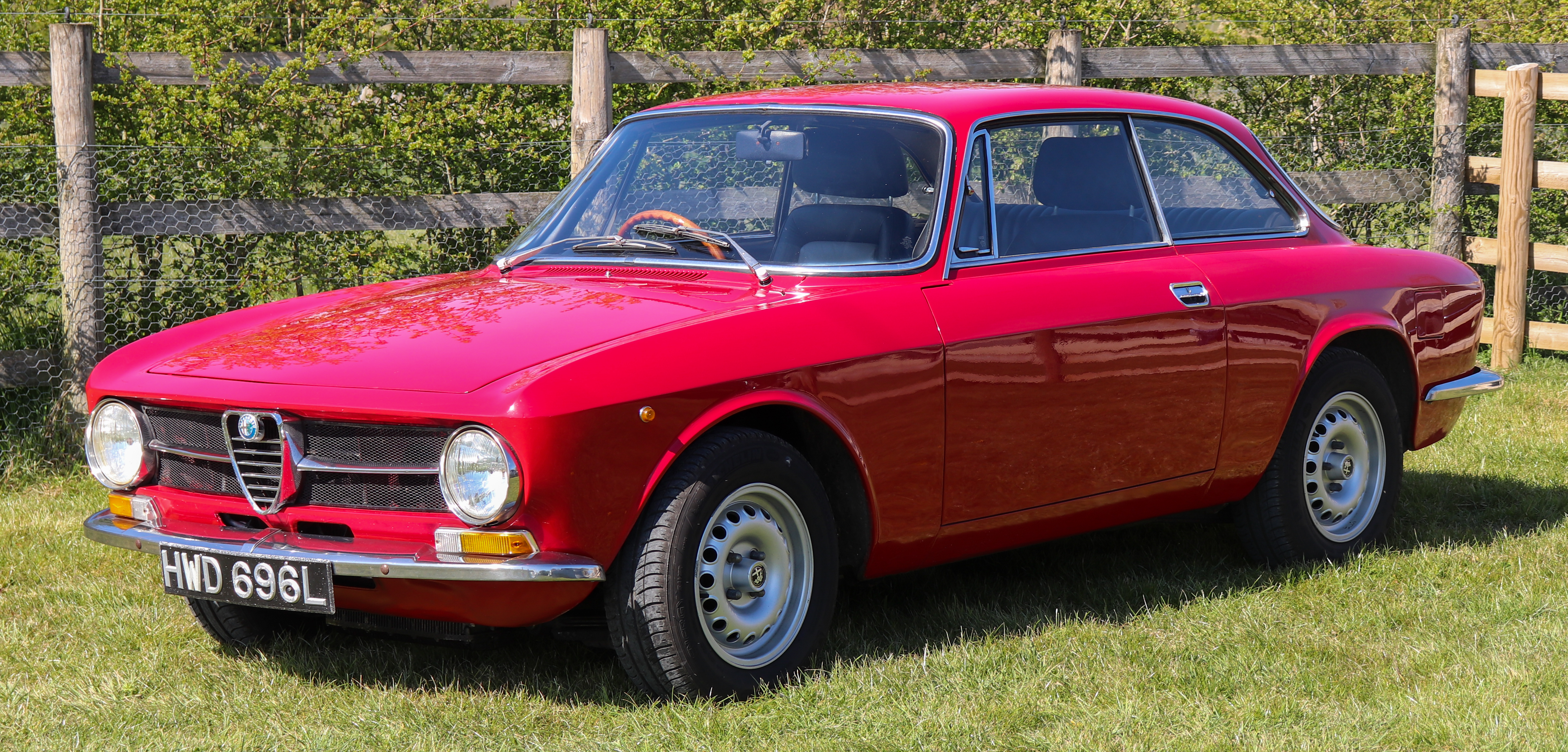
GT Junior (1965)

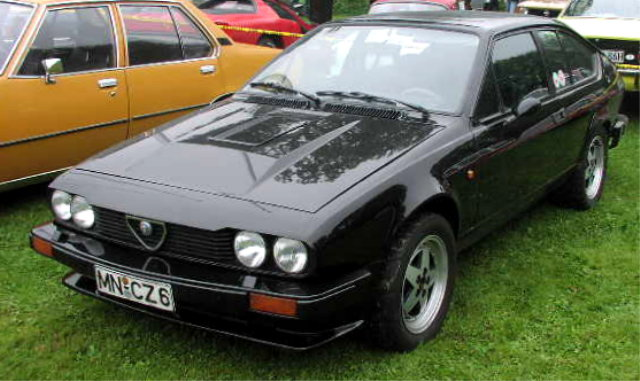
GTV6 (1980)

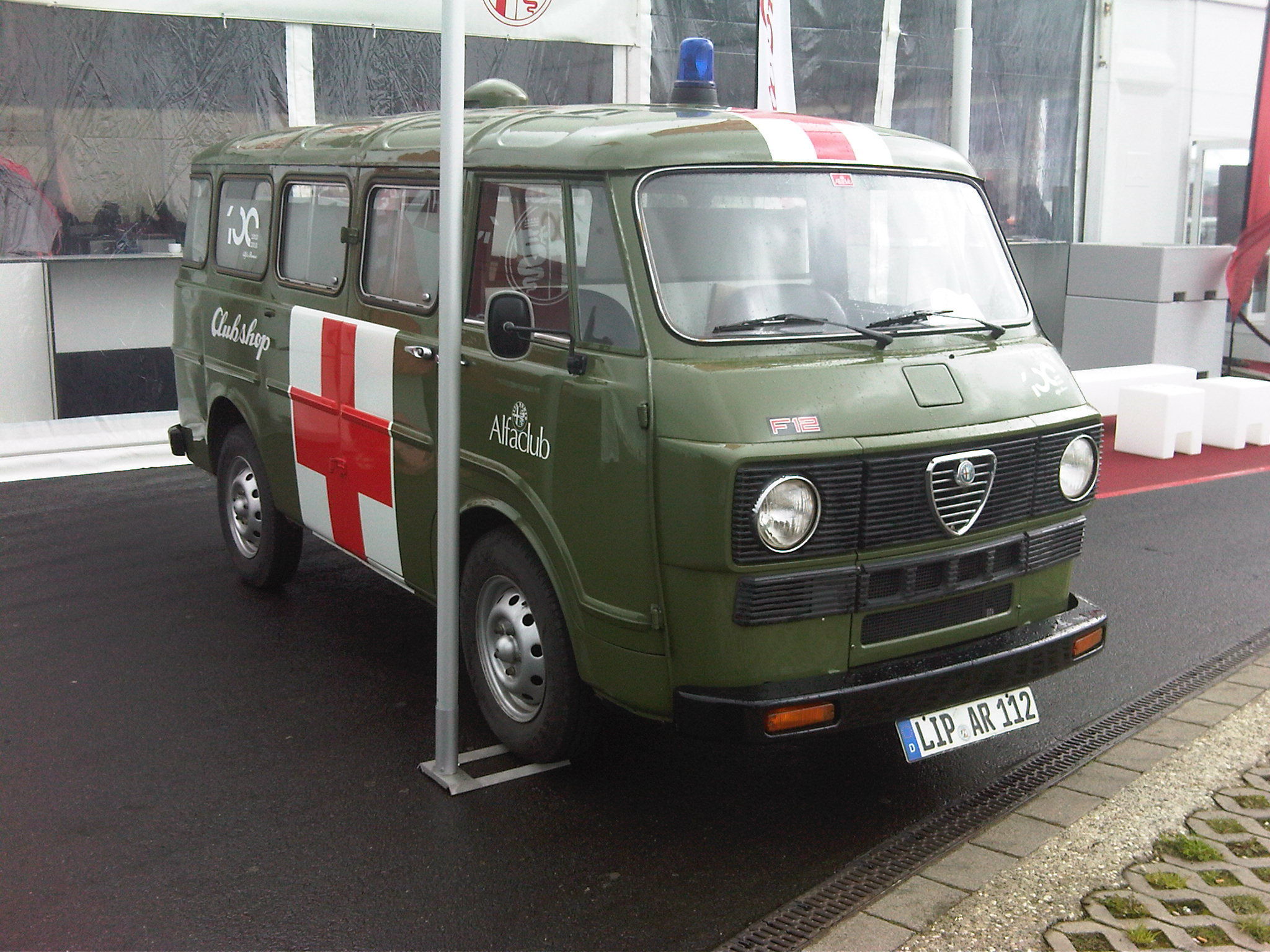
Autotutto F12 ambulance

	Road cars	Racing cars
1910	1910–1920 24 HP; 1910–1911 12 HP; 1911–1920 15 HP; 1913–1922 40–60 HP	1911 15 HP Corsa; 1913 40–60 HP Corsa; 1914 Grand Prix
1920	1921–1922 20–30 HP; 1920–1921 G1; 1921-1921 G2; 1922–1927 RL; 1923–1925 RM; 1927–1929 6C 1500; 1929–1933 6C 1750	1922 RL Super Sport; 1923 RL Targa Florio; 1923 P1; 1924 P2; 1928 6C 1500 MMS; 1929 6C 1750 Super Sport
1930	1931–1934 8C 2300; 1933-1933 6C 1900; 1934–1937 6C 2300; 1935–1939 8C 2900; 1939–1950 6C 2500	1931 Tipo A 1931 8C 2300 Monza; 1932 Tipo B (P3); 1935 Bimotore; 1935 8C 35; 1935 8C 2900A; 1936 12C 36; 1937 12C 37; 1937 6C 2300B Mille Miglia; 1937 8C 2900B Mille Miglia; 1938 308; 1938 312; 1938 316; 1938 158; 1939 6C 2500 Super Sport Corsa
1940		1948 6C 2500 Competizione
1950	1950–1958 1900; 1951–1953 Matta; 1954–1962 Giulietta; 1958–1962 2000; 1959–1964 Dauphine	1951 159; 1952 6C 3000 CM
1960	1962–1968 2600; 1962–1976 Giulia Saloon; 1963–1967 Giulia TZ; 1963–1977 Giulia Sprint; 1963–1966 Giulia Sprint Speciale 1965–1977 GT Junior; 1965–1967 Gran Sport Quattroruote; 1965–1971 GTA; 1963–1965 Giulia Spider; 1966–1993 Spider; 1967–1969 33 Stradale; 1967–1977 1750/2000 Berlina	1960 Giulietta SZ; 1963 Giulia TZ; 1965 GTA; 1965 Tipo 33; 1968 33/2; 1969 33/3
1970	1970–1977 Montreal; 1972–1983 Alfasud; 1972–1984 Alfetta saloon 1974–1987 Alfetta GT/GTV; 1976–1989 Alfasud Sprint; 1977–1985 Nuova Giulietta; 1979–1986 Alfa 6	1972 33/4; 1973 33TT12; 1976 33SC12; 1979 177; 1979 179
1980	1983–1994 33; 1984–1987 Arna; 1984–1987 90; 1985–1992 75; 1987–1998 164; 1989–1993 SZ/RZ	1982 182; 1983 183; 1984 184; 1985 185
1990	1992–1998 155; 1994–2000 145; 1995–2000 146; 1993/4–2004 GTV/Spider; 1996–2007 156; 1996–2007 166	1992 155 GTA; 1993 155 V6 TI; 1998 156 D2; 1999 GTV Cup
2000	2000–2010 147; 2007–2009 8C Competizione; 2008–2010 8C Spider; 2003–2010 GT; 2005–2010 Brera; 2004–2011 159; 2006–2010 Spider; 2008–2018 MiTo	2002 156 GTA Super 2000; 2003 156 Super 2000; 2003 147 GTA Cup
2010	2010–2020 Giulietta; 2013–2019 4C; 2015–2020 4C Spider	2015 TCR/WTCR/BTCC Giulietta QV; 2019 C38
2020		2020 C39; 2021 C41; 2022 C42; 2023 C43

==== Carabinieri, Polizia, and the Italian government ====
In the 1960s, Alfa Romeo became famous for models specifically designed for Italian police and Carabinieri (Italian national gendarmerie); among them the "Giulia Super" and the 2600 Sprint GT. The colours of the Alfa Romeos used by the police (Polizia) were/are green/blue with white stripes and writing, known as "Pantera" (Panthers). The Carabinieri Alfa Romeros are dark blue with white roofs and red stripes, known as the "Gazzella" (Gazelles), a nickname meant to denote the speed and agility of these "Pattuglie" (patrol cars). However, the term "Pantera" came to be used interchangeably to refer to both agencies' vehicles, and helped create a public perception of the cars as no-nonsense, determined and respected.

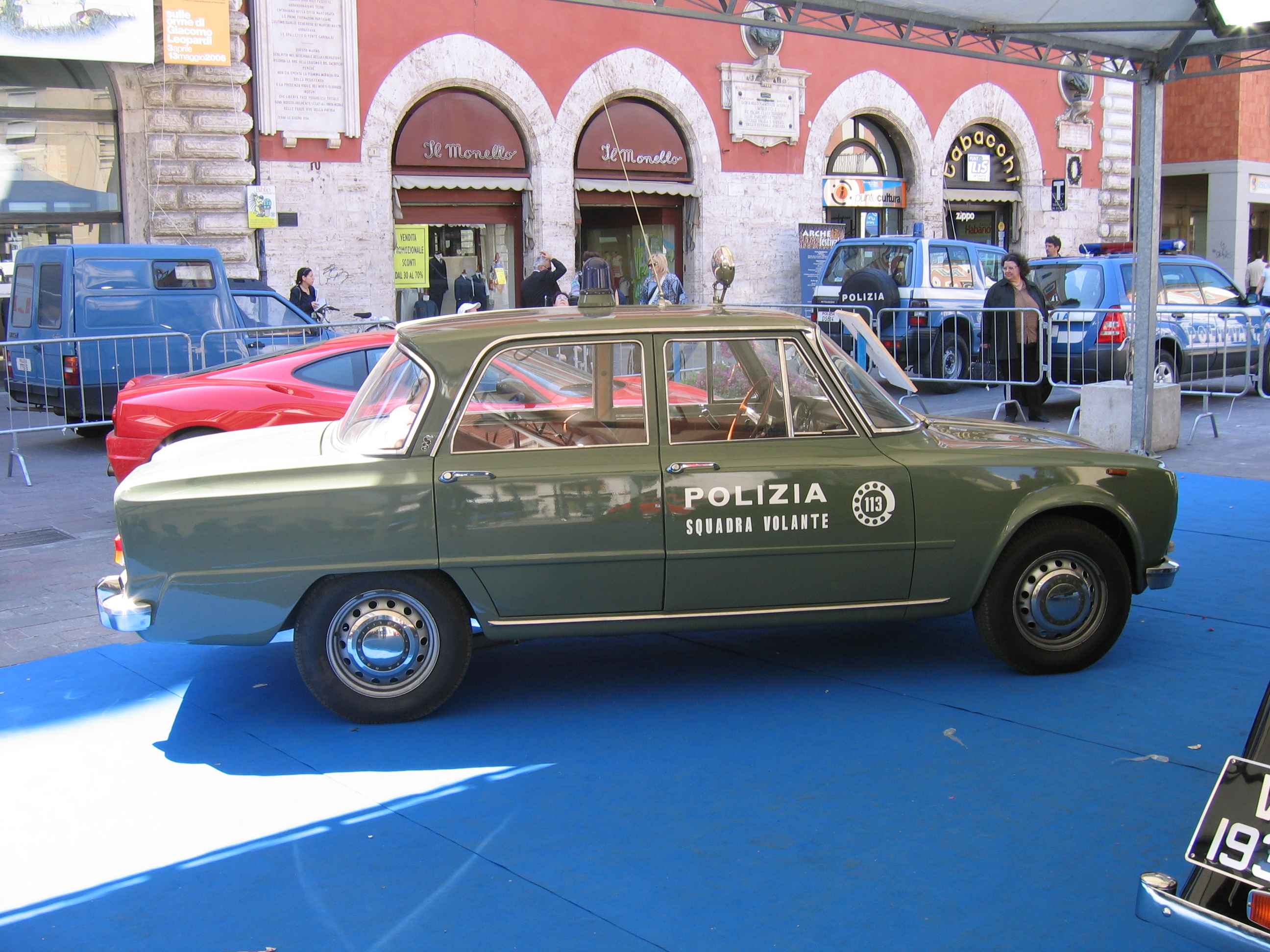
Italian State Police Flying Squad "Panther" 1971 Alfa Giulia Super

Since then, Alfa Romeos remain the chosen vehicle of the Carabinieri, Polizia Autostradale (highway police), Guardia di Finanza (fiscal law enforcement) and the conventional police service (Polizia). The following Alfa Romeo cars have/can be found in service with the Italian police and/or government.

• Alfa Romeo AR51
• Alfa Romeo Giulia
• Alfa Romeo Alfetta
• Alfa Romeo Giulietta
• Alfa Romeo 33 (Polizia di Stato only)
• Alfa Romeo 75
• Alfa Romeo 164 (official vehicles)
• Alfa Romeo 155
• Alfa Romeo 156
• Alfa Romeo 166 (official vehicles)
• Alfa Romeo 159
• Alfa Romeo Giulietta
• Alfa Romeo Giulia (Carabinieri, 2 Giulia Quadrifoglio - Polizia di Stato, 2 Giulia Veloce Q4)

Since the 1960s, the Italian Prime Minister has used Alfa Romeos (and lately the new Maserati Quattroporte) as preferred government limousines. The 164 and 166 have found been particularly utilized in the last two decades.

=== Trucks and light commercial vehicles ===
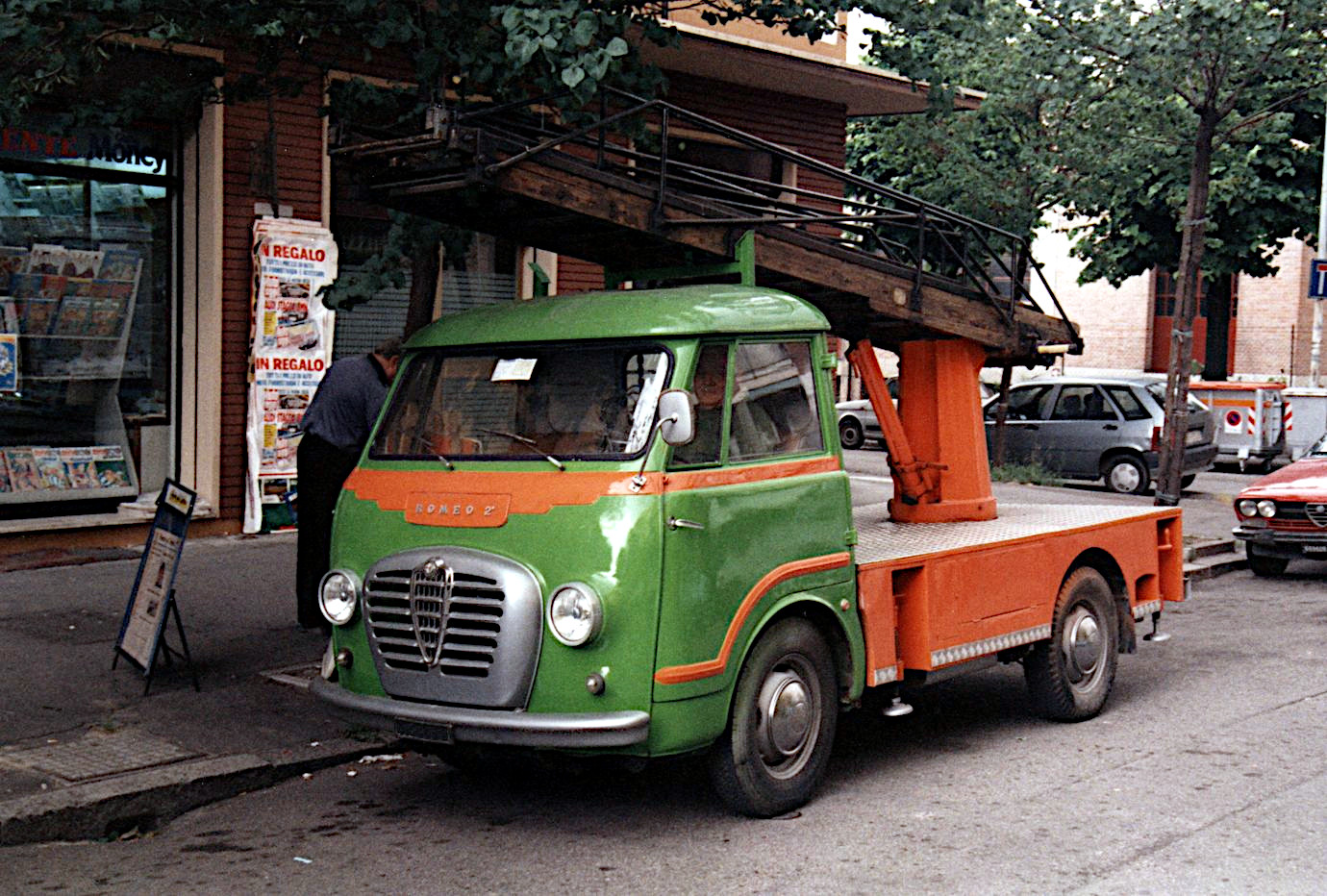
Romeo2 LCV

In 1930, Alfa Romeo presented a light truck in addition to heavy LCVs based on Büssing constructions. In the Second World War Alfa Romeo also built trucks for the Italian army ("35 tons anywhere") and later also for the German Wehrmacht. After the war, commercial motor vehicle production was resumed.

In co-operation with FIAT and Saviem starting from the 1960s different light truck models were developed.

The production of heavy LCVs in Italy was terminated in 1967. Heavy trucks continued to be built for a few years in Brazil by Alfa Romeo subsidiary Fábrica Nacional de Motores under the name FNM. The last Alfa Romeo vans were the Alfa Romeo AR6 and AR8, rebadged versions of Iveco Daily and Fiat Ducato. The company also produced trolleybuses for many systems in Italy, Latin America, Sweden, Greece, Germany, Turkey and South Africa. Later, Alfa Romeo concentrated only on passenger car manufacturing.

LCVs

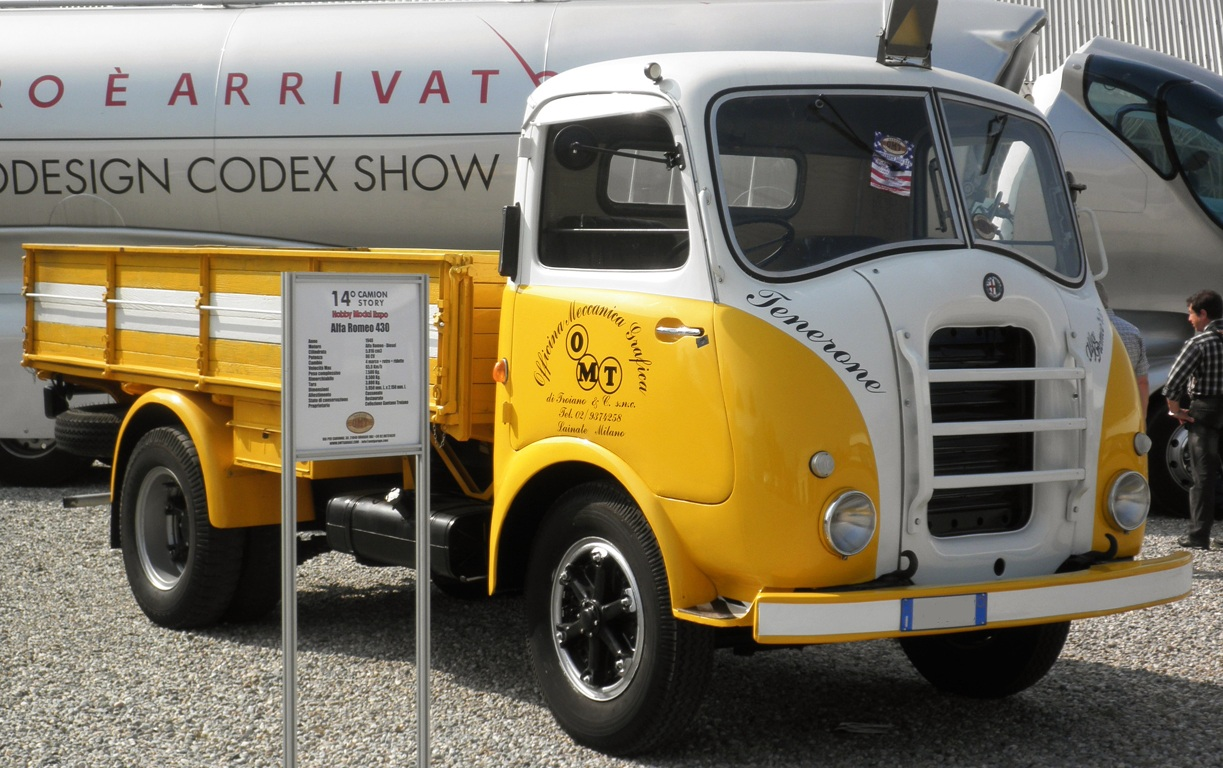
Alfa Romeo 430

- Alfa Romeo Romeo (1954–1958)
- Alfa Romeo Romeo 2 (until 1966)
- Alfa Romeo Romeo 3 (1966)
- Alfa Romeo A11/F11 (1954–1983)
- Alfa Romeo A12/F12
- AR8 (based on first generation Iveco Daily)
- AR6 (based on first generation Fiat Ducato)
- Alfa Romeo F20 (Saviem license)

Trucks

- Alfa Romeo 50 "Biscione" (Büssing-NAG 50)/ 80 (1931–1934)
- Alfa Romeo 85 / 110 (1934 – n/a)
- Alfa Romeo 350 (1935 – n/a)
- Alfa Romeo 430 (1942–1950)
- Alfa Romeo 450/455 (1947–1959)
- Alfa Romeo 500 (1937–1945)
- Alfa Romeo 800 (1940–1943)
- Alfa Romeo 900 (1947–1954)
- Alfa Romeo 950 (1954–1958)
- Alfa Romeo Mille (Alfa Romeo 1000) (1958–1964)
- Alfa Romeo A15 (Saviem license)
- Alfa Romeo A19 (Saviem license)
- Alfa Romeo A38 (Saviem license)

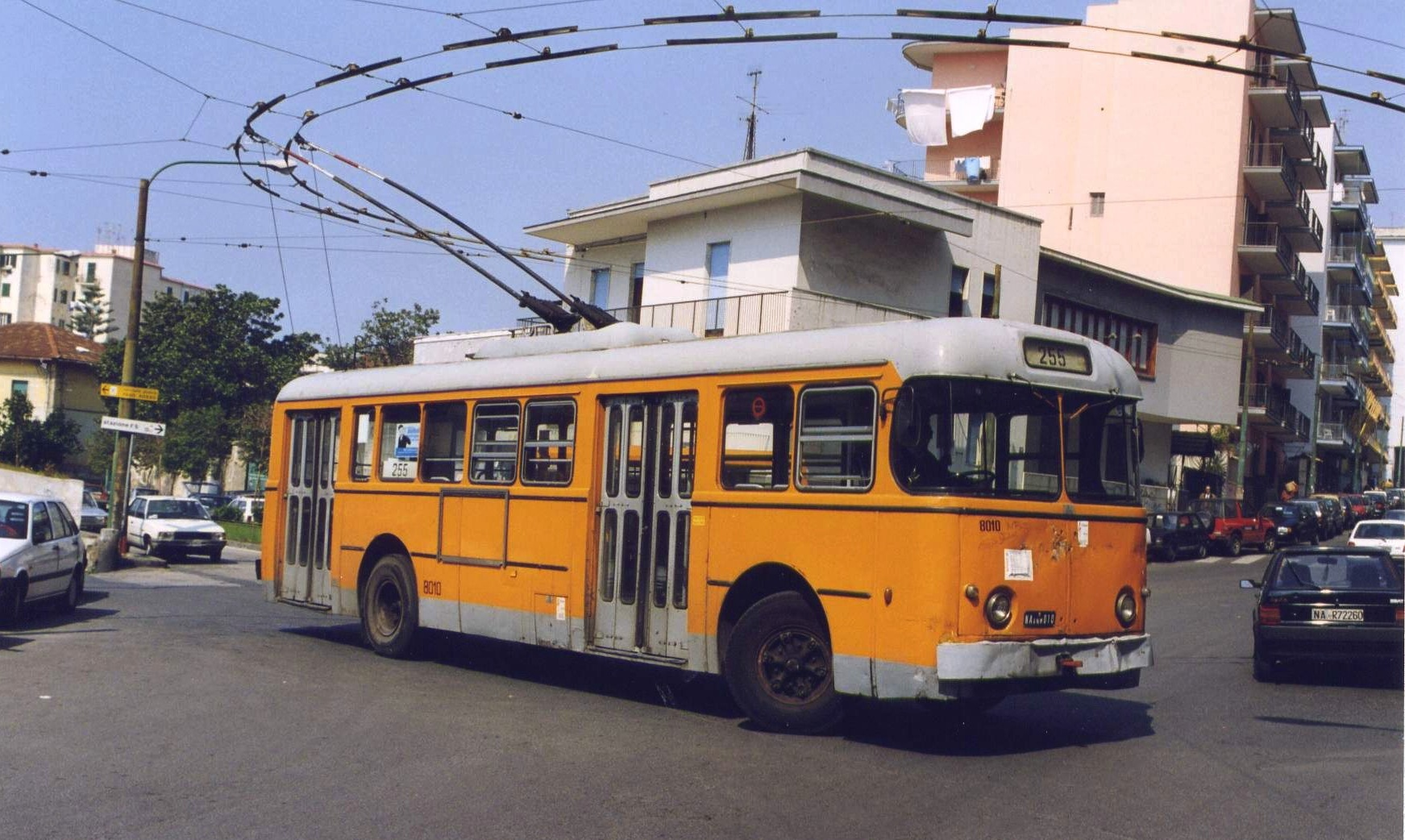
A 1961 Alfa Romeo 1000 (Mille) Aerfer FI 711.2 OCREN trolleybus on the Naples ANM trolleybus system

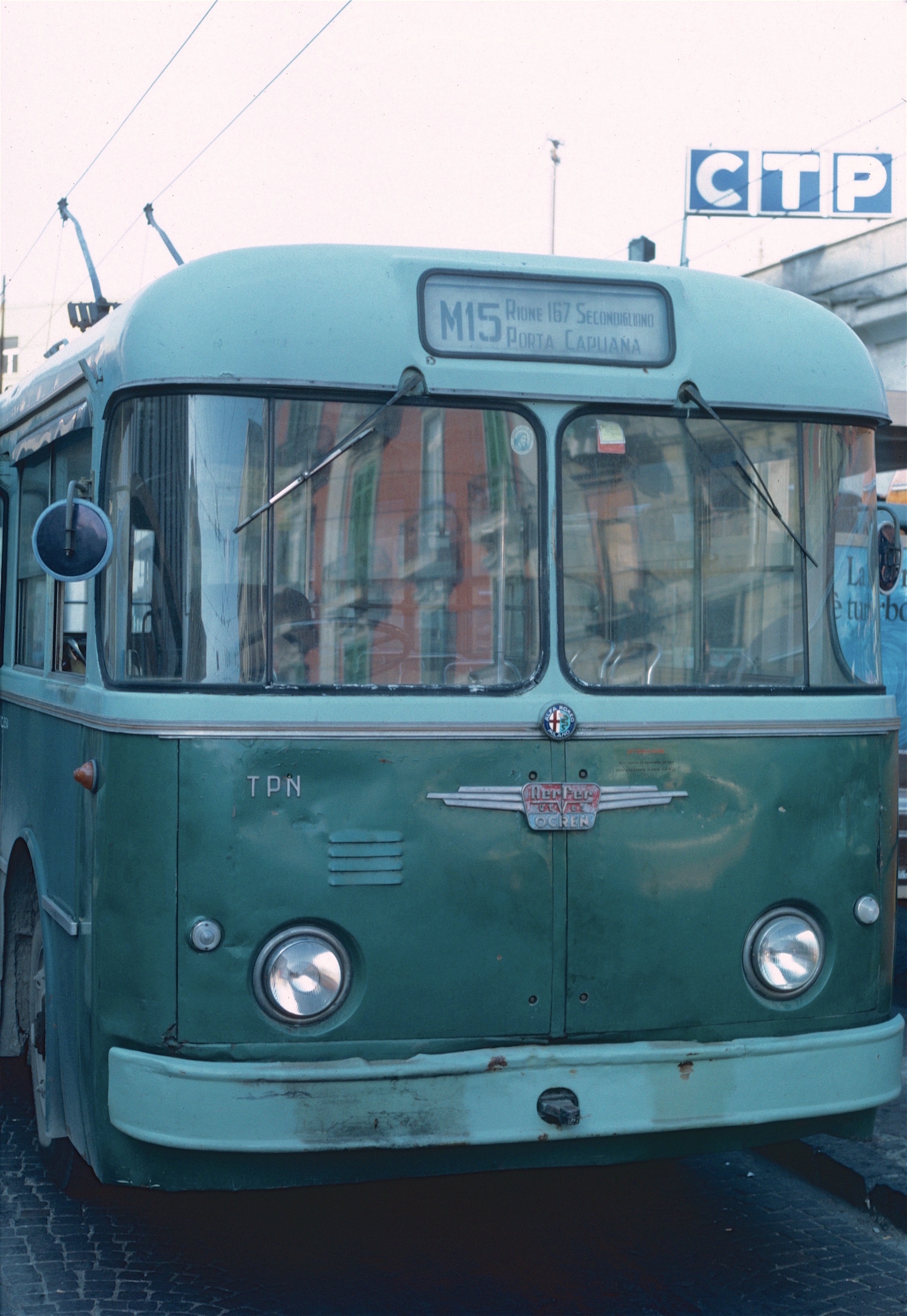
A 1962 Alfa Romeo Mille AF trolleybus for CTP Napoli, with the Alfa Romeo badge in the centre

Buses

- Alfa Romeo 40A
- Alfa Romeo 80A
- Alfa Romeo 85A
- Alfa Romeo 110A
- Alfa Romeo 140A (1950–1958)
- Alfa Romeo 150A (1958)
- Alfa Romeo 430A (1949–1953)
- Alfa Romeo 500A (1945–1948)
- Alfa Romeo 800A
- Alfa Romeo 900A (1953–1956)
- Alfa Romeo 902A (1957–1959)
- Alfa Romeo 950A
- Alfa Romeo Mille (bus) (Alfa Romeo 1000) (1960–1964)

Trolleybuses

- Alfa Romeo 85AF (1936–1940)
- Alfa Romeo 110AF (1938)
- Alfa Romeo 140AF (1949)
- Alfa Romeo 800AF (1950–1954)
- Alfa Romeo 900AF (1955–1957)
- Alfa Romeo 911AF (1959–1960)
- Alfa Romeo Mille Aerfer (1960–1963)
- Alfa Romeo Mille AF (1959–1964)

== Other production ==
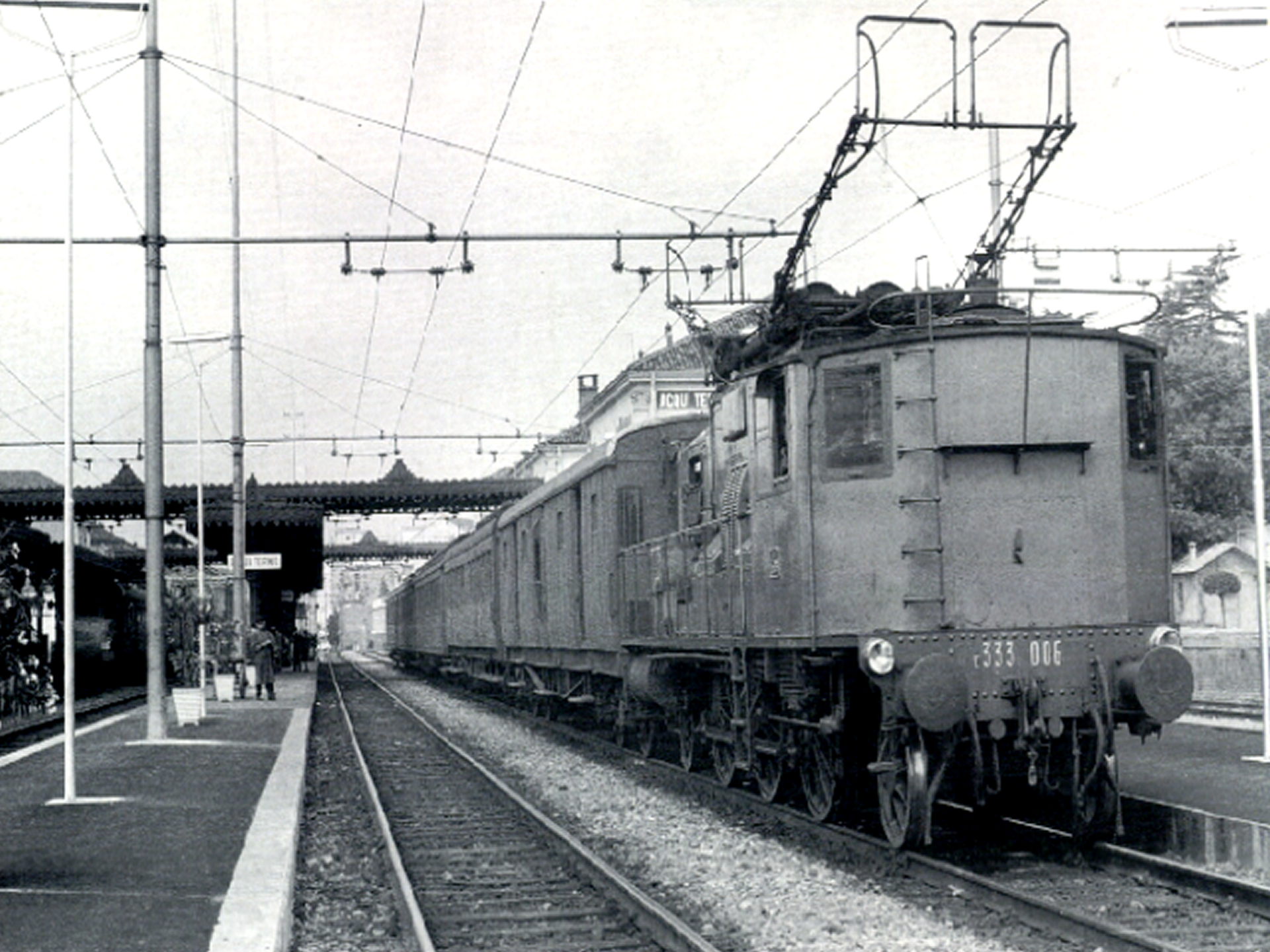
Locomotive FS E.333 built by Ing. Nicola Romeo e Co. in Saronno

Although Alfa Romeo is best known as automobile manufacturer it has also produced commercial vehicles of various size, railway locomotives, tractors, buses, trams, compressors, generators, an electric cooker, marine and aircraft engines.

=== Aircraft engines ===
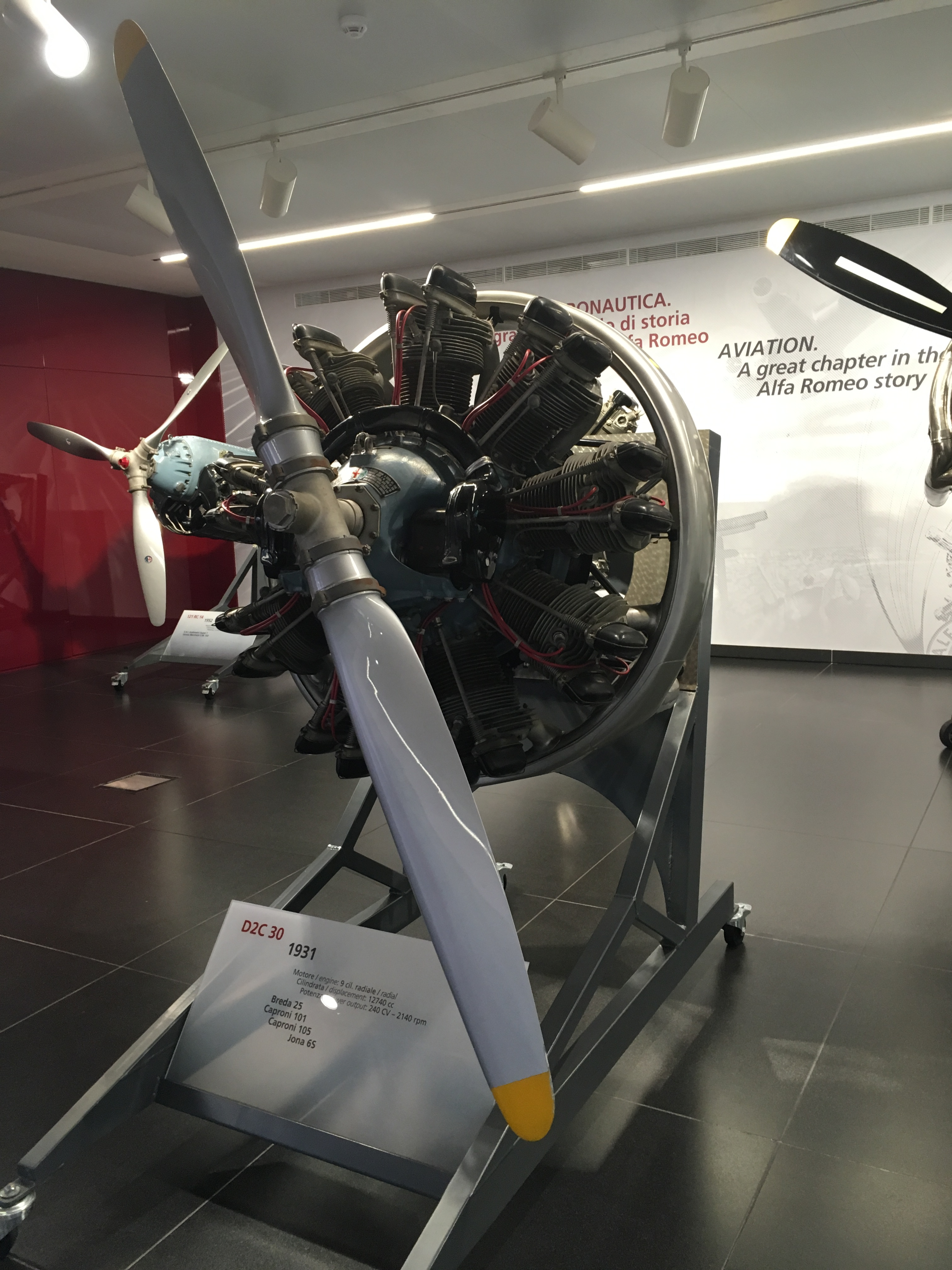
D2 aircraft engine

An Alfa engine was first used on an aircraft in 1910 on the Santoni-Franchini biplane. In 1932 Alfa Romeo built its first real aircraft engine, the D2 (240 bhp), fitted to Caproni 101 D2. In the 1930s when Alfa Romeo engines were used for aircraft on a larger scale; the Savoia Marchetti SM.74, Savoia-Marchetti SM.75, Savoia-Marchetti SM.79, Savoia Marchetti SM.81 and Cant Z506B Airone all used Alfa Romeo manufactured engines. In 1931, a competition was arranged where Tazio Nuvolari drove his Alfa Romeo 8C 3000 Monza against a Caproni Ca.100 airplane.

Alfa Romeo built various aircraft engines during the Second World War; the best known was the RA.1000 RC 41-I Monsone, a licensed version of the Daimler-Benz DB 601. This engine made it possible to build efficient fighter aircraft like the Macchi C.202 Folgore for the Italian army. After the Second World War Alfa Romeo produced engines for Fiat, Aerfer and Ambrosini. In the 1960s Alfa Romeo mainly focused upgrading and maintaining Curtiss-Wright, Pratt & Whitney, Rolls-Royce and General Electric aircraft engines.

Alfa Romeo also built Italy's first turbine engine, installed to the Beechcraft King Air. Alfa Romeo's Avio division was sold to Aeritalia in 1988, from 1996 it was part of Fiat Avio. Alfa Avio was also part of developing team to the new T700-T6E1 engine to the NHI NH90 helicopter.

=== Marine engines ===
Alfa Romeo also produced marine engines. The first marine engine was produced in 1929. Later, for three consecutive years: 1937-1938-1939 with remarkable affirmations, Alfa Romeo contributed to the development of marine engines.

- (1938) 12 cyl (4.500) 121,710 km/h

=== Aero-engines ===
- Alfa Romeo D2
- Alfa Romeo 110
- Alfa Romeo 115
- Alfa Romeo 121
- Alfa Romeo 125
- Alfa Romeo 126
- Alfa Romeo 128
- Alfa Romeo 135
- Alfa Romeo Lynx
- Alfa Romeo Mercurius
- Alfa Romeo RA.1000
- Alfa Romeo RA-1050
- Alfa Romeo R.C.10
- Alfa Romeo R.C.34
- Alfa Romeo R.C.35
- Alfa Romeo AR.318

== Marketing and sponsorship ==
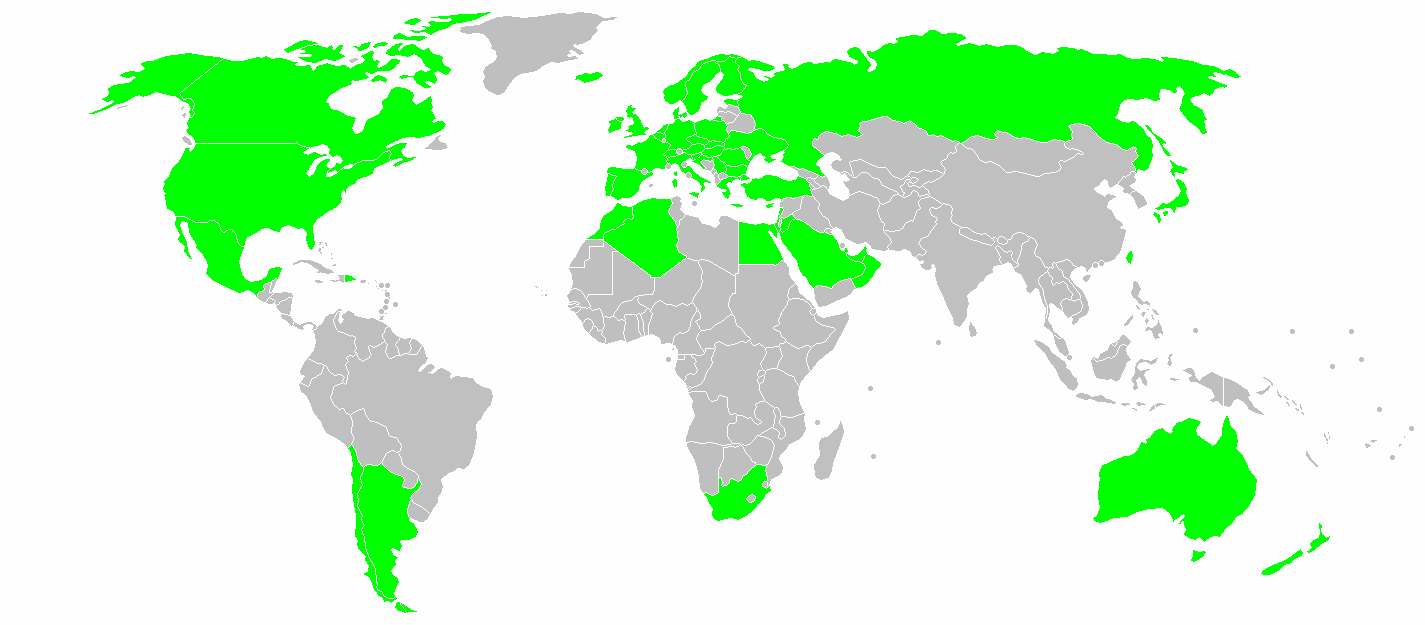
Alfa Romeo official dealers worldwide map

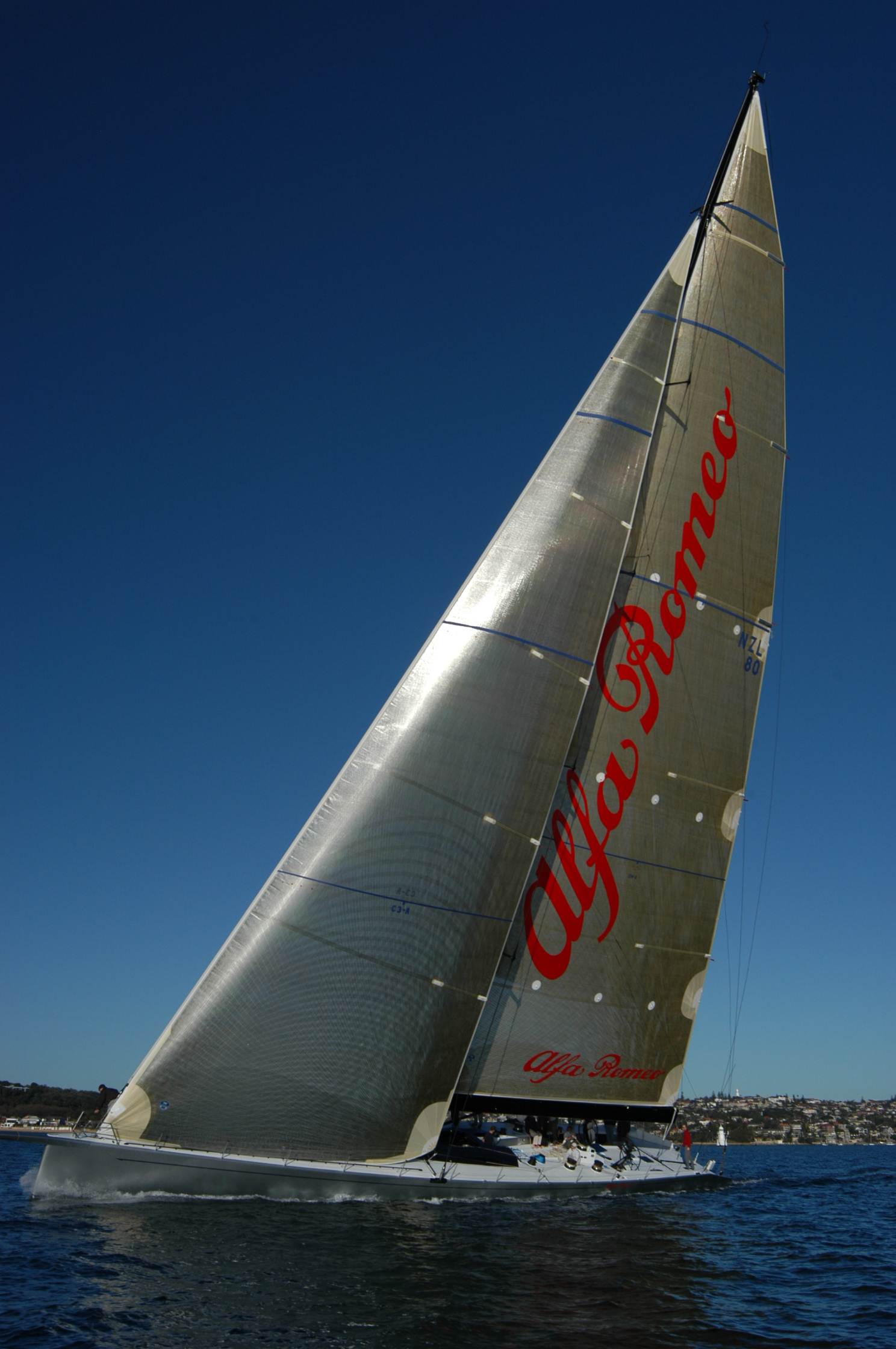
Alfa Romeo II on its first sail

Over the years, Alfa Romeo models have been marketed with a variety of slogans, such as: "The family car that wins races" used in the 1950s in Alfa Romeo 1900 marketing campaign, "racing since 1911" used on most 1960s Alfa advertisements. In the 1970s, the Alfa Romeo 1750 GTV was marketed as "if this kind of handling is good enough for our racing cars, it's good enough for you." The Giulia Sprint GTA was marketed as "The car you drive to work is a champion". More recent slogans used are "Mediocrity is a sin", "Driven by Passion", "Cuore Sportivo", "Beauty is not enough" and present day "Without heart we would be mere machines". Also other more recent ones are: "It's not a car, it's an Alfa Romeo.", one of them after a couple argue in Italian.

As part of its marketing policy, Alfa Romeo sponsors a number of sporting events, such as the Mille Miglia rally. It has sponsored the SBK Superbike World Championship and Ducati Corse since 2007, and the Goodwood Festival of Speed for many years, and was one of the featured brands in 2010 when Alfa Romeo celebrated its 100th anniversary. The Alfa Romeo Giulietta has been used since Monza 2010 race as the safety car in Superbike World Championship events. Alfa Romeo has been also shirt sponsor of Eintracht Frankfurt football club in period between 2013 and 2016.

In 2002, Alfa Romeo I, the first Alfa Romeo super maxi yacht was launched. It finished first in at least 74 races including the 2002 Sydney—Hobart Race. Alfa Romeo II, commissioned in 2005, measures 30 metres (98 ft) LOA. It set a new elapsed-time record for monohulls in the 2009 Transpac race, of 5 days, 14 hours, 36 minutes, 20 seconds. It finished first in at least 140 races. In mid-2008 Alfa Romeo III was launched for competitive fleet racing under the IRC rule. Alfa Romeo III measures 21.4 metres (70 ft) LOA and features interior design styled after the Alfa Romeo 8C Competizione.

The BBC motoring show Top Gear repeatedly argued the significance of owning an Alfa Romeo car as a car enthusiast, stating that "You can't be a true petrolhead if you have never owned/or wanted to own an Alfa Romeo". Presenters Jeremy Clarkson, Richard Hammond and James May continuously praised Alfas for their beauty and driving characteristics even though Italian cars had a long-term bad reputation for unreliability. They argued that the owner build a personal relationship with the car despite all of its mechanical faults. Both Clarkson and May have previously owned Alfas (a GTV6 for Clarkson and an Alfa 164 for May) and both have stated that they regretted selling their Alfas the most.

As part of its U.S. relaunch, Alfa Romeo ran three commercials during Super Bowl LI; the brand was the sole marque advertised by FCA during the game, after exclusively focusing on its Jeep brand at Super Bowl 50.

In February 2013, Alfa Romeo sponsored University of St Andrews FS fashion show which saw luxury fashion designer Luke Archer and milliner George Jenkins win with their Alfa Romeo inspired garments.

Alfa Romeo announced Zhou Guanyu as China's first Formula One racing driver for the 2022 season, hailed by both the team and the sport as a historic breakthrough in a key growth market.

== See also ==
- Alfa Romeo Arese Plant
- Alfa Romeo Pomigliano d'Arco Plant
- Alfa Romeo Portello Plant
- Alfa Romeo Museum
- Circuito di Balocco
- Alfa Romeo in motorsport
- Category: Alfa Romeo engines
- Category: Alfa Romeo people
