= Alfa Romeo 90 =

Executive car produced by Italian car manufacturer Alfa Romeo

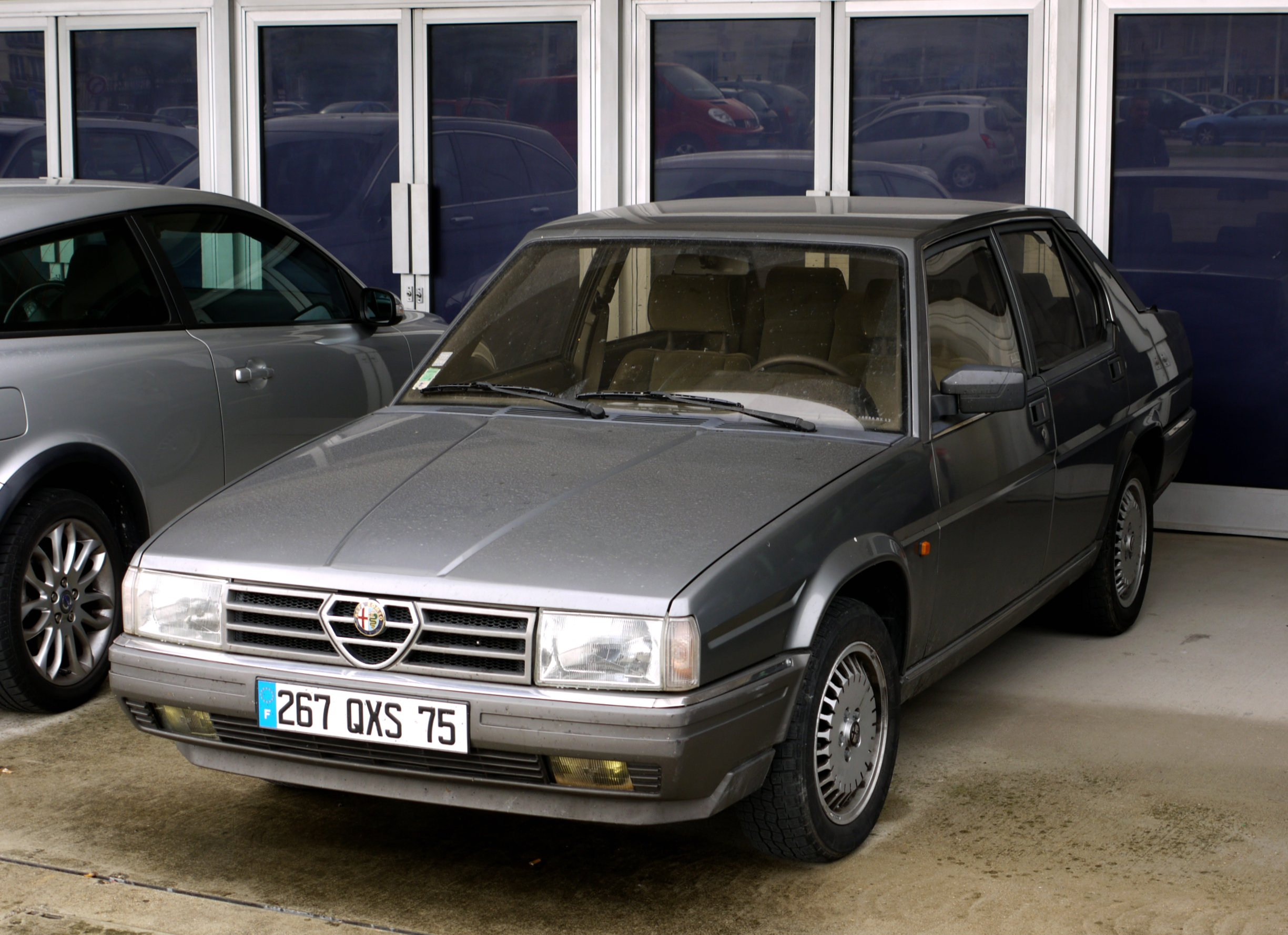

Overview
- Manufacturer: Alfa Romeo
- Production: 1984–1987
- Assembly: Italy: Arese Plant, Lombardy
- Designer: Bertone under Marc Deschamps

Body and chassis
- Class: Executive car (E)
- Body style: 4-door saloon
- Layout: Front-engine, rear-wheel-drive
- Related: Alfa Romeo Alfetta

Powertrain
- Engine: Petrol 1.8 L Twin Cam I4; 2.0 L Twin Cam I4; 2.0 L Alfa Romeo V6; 2.5 L Alfa Romeo V6; Diesel: 2.4 L VM HR 492 Turbo-diesel I4
- Transmission: 5-speed manual

Dimensions
- Wheelbase: 2,510 mm (98.8 in)
- Length: 4,390 mm (172.8 in)
- Width: 1,640 mm (64.6 in)
- Height: 1,420 mm (55.9 in)
- Kerb weight: 1,080–1,250 kg (2,380–2,760 lb)

Chronology
- Predecessor: Alfa Romeo Alfetta
- Successor: Alfa Romeo 164

The Alfa Romeo 90 (Type 162A) is an executive car produced by Italian car manufacturer Alfa Romeo between 1984 and 1987.

== History ==
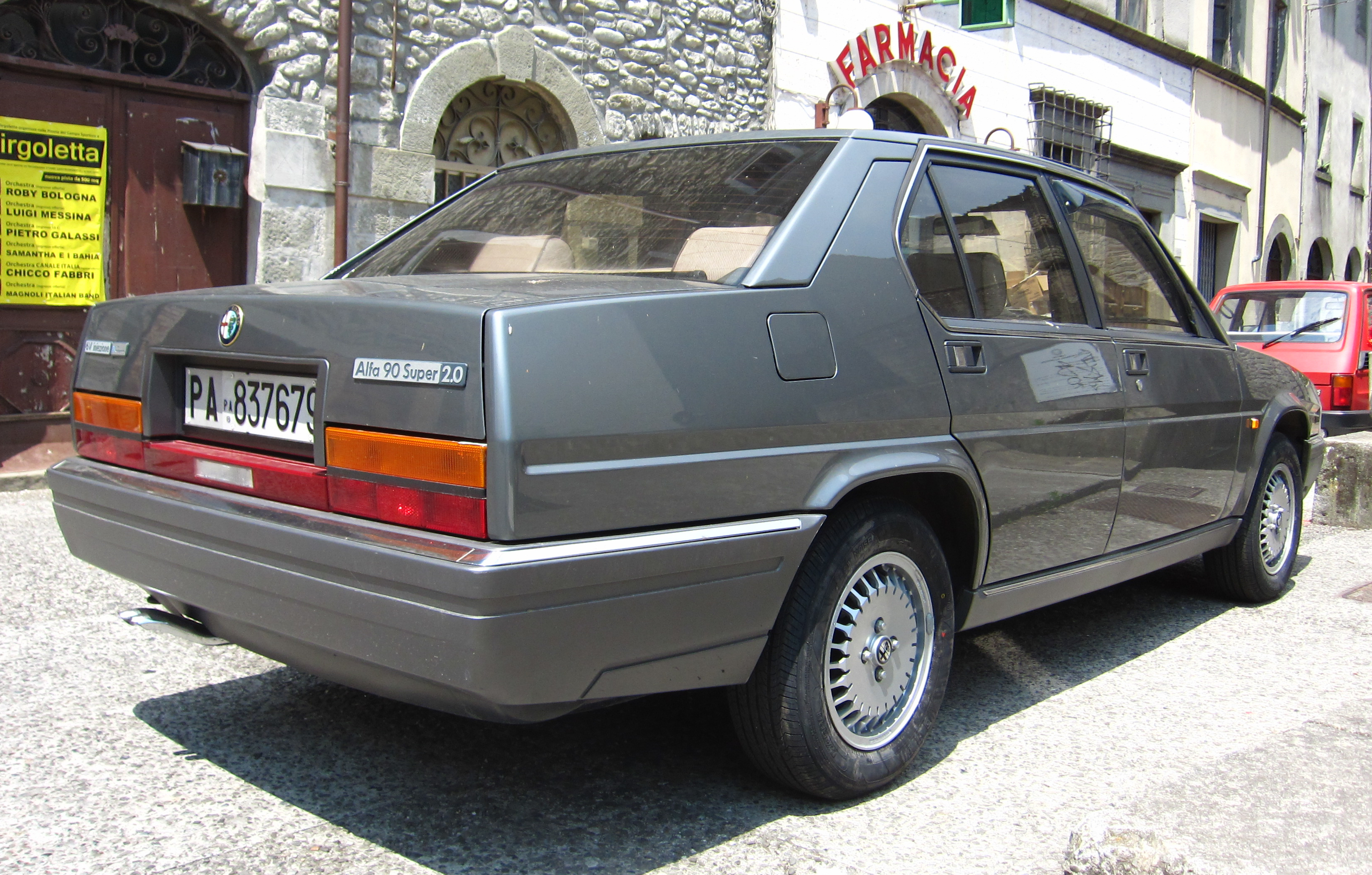
Rear

Designed by Bertone and introduced at the 1984 Turin Motor Show, the 90 was pitched between the Alfa Romeo Giulietta (nuova) and the Alfa Romeo Alfa 6, both of which were soon discontinued after the 90's launch. The car used the Alfetta's chassis (including its rear mounted transaxle) and used engines from the larger Alfa 6. The bodywork was similar to both, albeit modernised. One notable feature of the 90's design was a small chin spoiler which extended above a certain speed to aid engine cooling. Its angular lines with integrated bumpers gave the car a neat look consistent with the period, however the aerodynamics suffered with a drag coefficient of Cd=0.37. The cars design was conservative, inside and out, with perhaps the only unusual element being the U-shaped parking brake lever.

The 90 was equipped with electric front windows and electrically adjustable seats as standard. The more luxurious Gold Cloverleaf (Quadrifoglio Oro) model had electric rear windows, a trip computer, power steering, central locking, metallic paint and a digital instrument panel as standard. The passenger fascia included a slot for an optional briefcase, made by Valextra. The external finish was very similar across the board, it being near impossible to tell the different models apart from appearance alone.

The 90 was revamped in 1986 with many minor changes throughout, the most obvious exterior change being a new grille with smaller horizontal slants. A total of 56,428 cars were sold over four years of production.

The 90 was only made as a sedan, but in 1985 Carrozzeria Marazzi developed a Station Wagon prototype at the behest of Italian motoring magazine Auto Capital; only two cars were made.

== Suspension ==
The 90 has a longitudinal front engine, a rear mounted gearbox with differential lock and independent front suspension wishbones with torsion bar springs and rear De Dion tube. It has disc brakes on all four wheels, the rear brakes are mounted inboard.

== Engines ==
Five engines were available: two Alfa Romeo Twin Cam engines; 1,779 cc and 1,962 cc and two fuel injected Alfa Romeo V6 engines: 1,996 cc or 2,492 cc, and finally a 2,393 cc turbodiesel made by VM Motori. The carburetted four cylinder engines have twin Dell'Orto carburettors with manual chokes, while the 1,962 cc was also available in a fuel injected variant which also incorporated a novel variable valve timing system. The fuel injected engine has the same maximum power but offered somewhat less torque; this was perhaps more than made up for with a 20 percent improvement in fuel economy.

The 2.0-litre V6 version was dedicated to the Italian market, where cars with engines over 2.0-litres were subjected to a doubled 38% VAT up to 1993. It was equipped with an innovative engine control unit and electronic injection system named CEM (Controllo Elettronico del Motore), developed by Alfa Romeo subsidiary SPICA. It manages the opening time of the injectors and the ignition depending on the angle of the butterfly valves, with one throttle body per cylinder unlike on the Bosch L-Jetronic used on the 2.5 litre V6 engine. V6 models received a double-plate clutch while the four-cylinder models rely on a single-plate unit.

| Model | Chassis code | Displacement | Engine code | Max power/rpm | Max torque/rpm | Fuel system | Top speed | Production | Units produced |
Petrol engines
| 90 1.8 | ZAR162A10 | 1,779 cc (108.6 cu in) | AR06202 | 120 PS (88 kW; 118 hp) at 5300 rpm | 17.0 kp⋅m (167 N⋅m; 123 lb⋅ft) at 4000 rpm | Two double carburettors | 186 km/h (116 mph) | 1984–1987 | 4,930 |
| 90 1.8 Super | ZAR162A10 | 1,779 cc (108.6 cu in) | AR06202 | 120 PS (88 kW; 118 hp) at 5300 rpm | 17.0 kp⋅m (167 N⋅m; 123 lb⋅ft) at 4000 rpm | Two double carburettors | 188 km/h (117 mph) | 1986–1987 | 1,040 |
| 90 2.0 | ZAR162A20 | 1,962 cc (119.7 cu in) | AR06212 | 128 PS (94 kW; 126 hp) at 5400 rpm | 18.2 kp⋅m (178 N⋅m; 132 lb⋅ft) at 4000 rpm | Two double carburettors | 191 km/h (119 mph) | 1984–1987 | 4,288 |
| 90 2.0 IE | ZAR162A2A | 1,962 cc (119.7 cu in) | AR01713 | 128 PS (94 kW; 126 hp) at 5400 rpm | 17.9 kp⋅m (176 N⋅m; 129 lb⋅ft) at 4000 rpm | Bosch Motronic port fuel injection | 190 km/h (118 mph) | 1984–1987 | 23,057 |
| 90 2.0I V6 | ZAR162A2B | 1,996 cc (121.8 cu in) | AR06210 | 132 PS (97 kW; 130 hp) at 5600 rpm | 18.0 kp⋅m (177 N⋅m; 130 lb⋅ft) at 3000 rpm | SPICA port fuel injection | 195 km/h (121 mph) | 1985–1987 | 1,577 |
| 90 2.5I V6 Super | ZAR162A2B | 1,996 cc (121.8 cu in) | AR06210 | 132 PS (97 kW; 130 hp) at 5600 rpm | 18.0 kp⋅m (177 N⋅m; 130 lb⋅ft) at 3000 rpm | SPICA port fuel injection | 195 km/h (121 mph) | 1985–1987 | 1,577 |
| 90 3.0 I V6 | ZAR162A00 | 2,492 cc (152.1 cu in) | AR01646 | 156 PS (115 kW; 154 hp) at 5600 rpm | 21.4 kp⋅m (210 N⋅m; 155 lb⋅ft) at 4000 rpm | Bosch L-Jetronic port fuel injection | 203 km/h (126 mph) | 1984–1987 | 6,212 |
| 90 2.5I V6 Super | ZAR162A00 | 2,492 cc (152.1 cu in) | AR01646 | 156 PS (115 kW; 154 hp) at 5600 rpm | 21.4 kp⋅m (210 N⋅m; 155 lb⋅ft) at 4000 rpm | Bosch L-Jetronic port fuel injection | 205 km/h (127 mph) | 1986–1987 | 6,212 |
Diesel engines
| 90 2.4 TD | ZAR162A30 | 2,393 cc (146.0 cu in) | VM81A01 | 110 PS (81 kW; 108 hp) at 4200 rpm | 24.0 kp⋅m (235 N⋅m; 174 lb⋅ft) at 2300 rpm | Indirect injection, turbo intercooler | 178 km/h (111 mph) | 1984–1987 | 11,274 |
| 90 2.4 TD Super | ZAR162A30 | 2,393 cc (146.0 cu in) | VM4HT | 110 PS (81 kW; 108 hp) at 4200 rpm | 24.0 kp⋅m (235 N⋅m; 174 lb⋅ft) at 2300 rpm | Indirect injection, turbo intercooler | 180 km/h (112 mph) | 1986–1988 | 4,050 |
| Total | | | | | | | | 1984–1987 | 56,428 |
