= Alfa Romeo Delfino =

Concept car designed by Bertone

Overview
- Manufacturer: Alfa Romeo
- Production: 1983
- Assembly: Italy
- Designer: Marc Deschamps at Bertone

Body and chassis
- Class: Concept car
- Body style: 2-door coupé
- Layout: Front-engine, rear-wheel drive
- Platform: Alfa Romeo Alfa 6

Powertrain
- Engine: 2492 cc naturally aspirated V6 (petrol)
- Transmission: 5-speed manual

Dimensions
- Wheelbase: 2,600 mm (102.4 in)
- Length: 4,140 mm (163.0 in)
- Width: 1,830 mm (72.0 in)
- Height: 1,180 mm (46.5 in)

The Delfino is a concept car built by Alfa Romeo in 1983.

The car was a 2-door coupé designed by Bertone, and was based on the Alfa Romeo Alfa 6 platform. It was presented at the Geneva Motor Show in 1983.

The Delfino had a Busso V6 engine that displaced 2,492 cc (152.1 cu in), and developed 158 hp (117.8 kW) of power at 5600 rpm.
