= Alfa Romeo Alfetta =

Sedan and fastback coupé

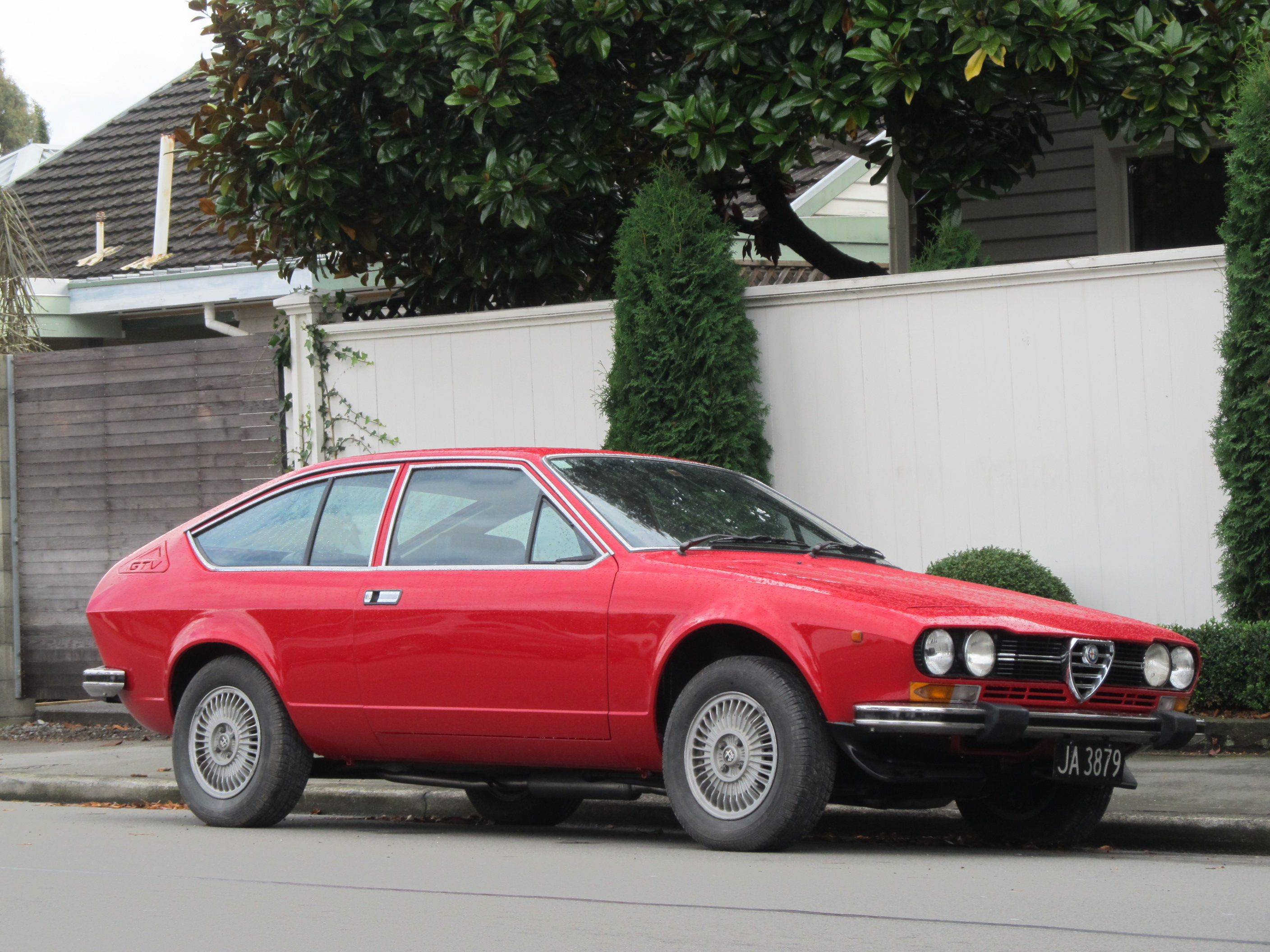
- 1978 Alfa Romeo Alfetta GTV 2.0

Overview
- Manufacturer: Alfa Romeo
- Model code: 116
- Production: 1972–1987
- Assembly: Italy: Arese Plant, Lombardy; South Africa: Rosslyn, Gauteng; Brits, North West

Body and chassis
- Body style: 4-door saloon 2-door coupé
- Layout: Front-engine, rear-wheel-drive
- Related: Alfa Romeo Giulietta (116); Alfa Romeo Alfa 6; Alfa Romeo 90

The Alfa Romeo Alfetta (Type 116) is a front-engine, five-passenger saloon and fastback coupé manufactured and marketed by Italian automaker Alfa Romeo from 1972 to 1987 with a total of over 400,000 units produced during its production run.

The Alfetta was noted for the rear position of its transaxle (clutch and transmission) and its De Dion tube rear suspension — an arrangement designed to optimize handling by balancing front/rear weight distribution, as well as maintaining a low polar moment of inertia and low center of gravity. The interior of Coupé models featured a then unusual central tachometer placement — by itself, directly in front of the driver.

The Alfetta name, which means "little Alfa" in Italian is derived from the nickname of the Alfa Romeo Alfetta (Tipo 159), a successful Formula One car which in its last iteration introduced in 1951, paired a transaxle layout to De Dion tube rear suspension — like its modern namesake.

== Design and dynamics ==
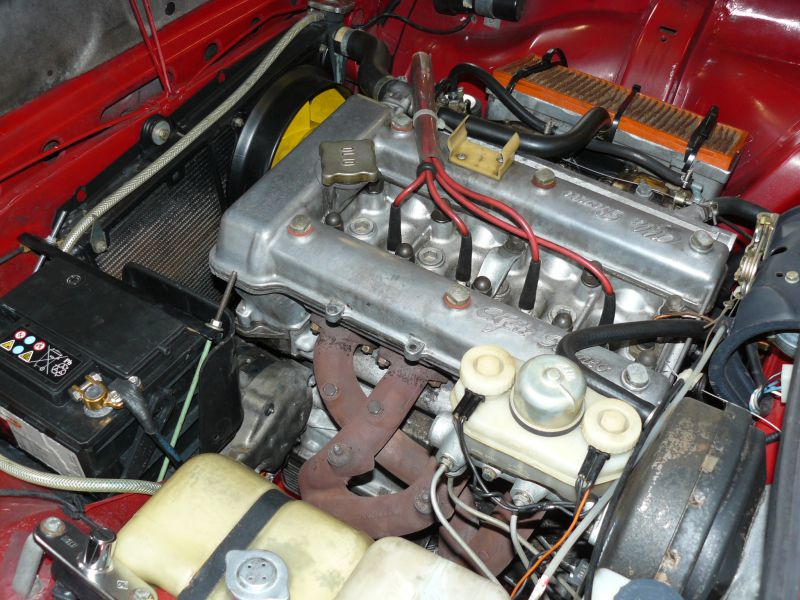
Alfetta GT engine bay

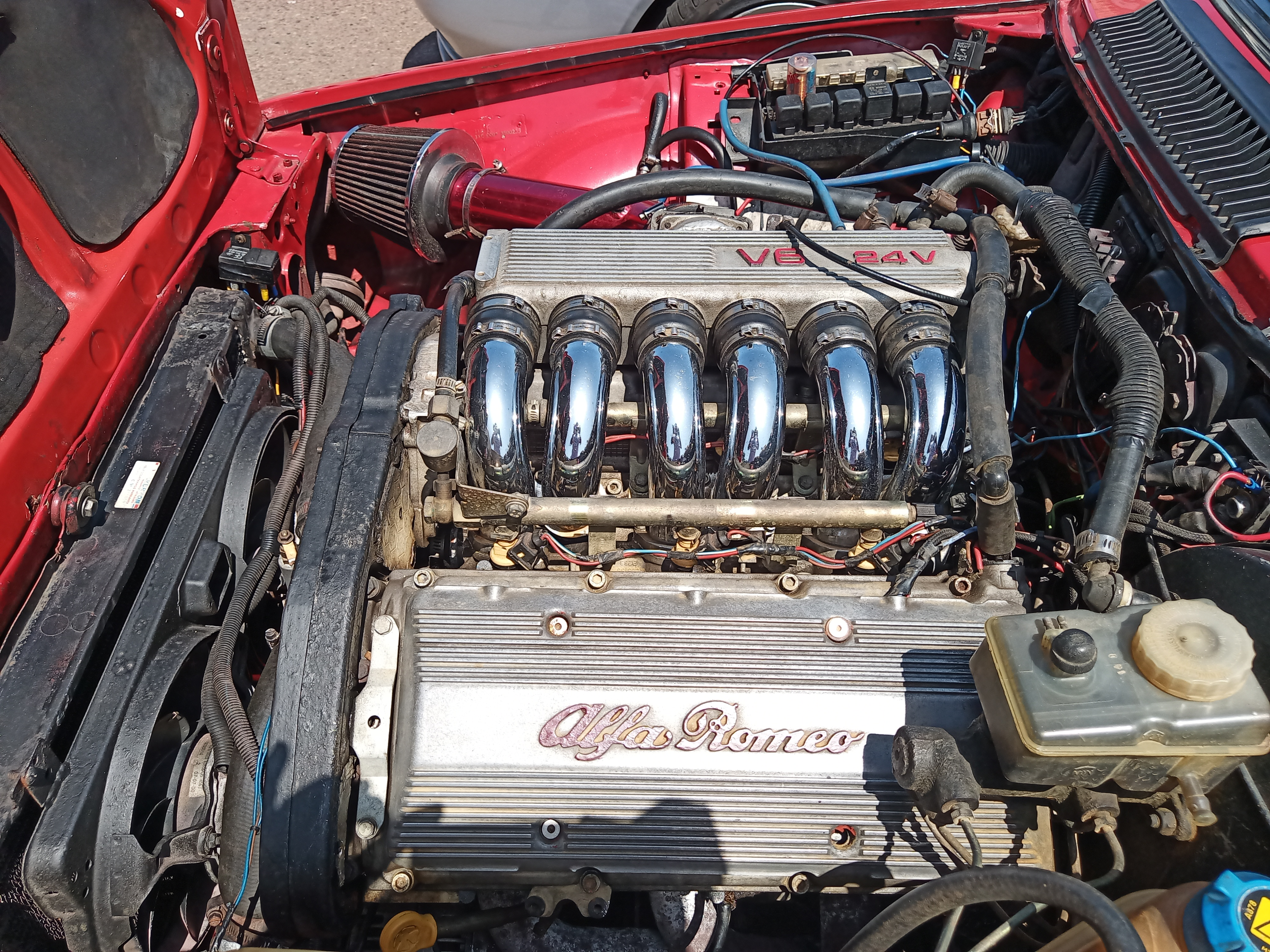
GTV 6 engine from later AR cars with 24 valves instead of the original 12 valves

The Alfetta introduced a new drivetrain layout to the marque. The clutch and transmission were housed at the rear of the car, together with the differential for a more balanced weight distribution, as used on the Alfetta 158/159 Grand Prix cars. The suspension relied on double wishbones and torsion bars at the front and a De Dion tube at the rear. When leaving the factory, all Alfettas were originally fitted with Pirelli Cinturato 165HR14 tyres.

The rear de Dion transaxle found on the Alfetta and derivatives- GTV, 90 and 75- provided these cars with an excellent weight distribution. The handling benefits were noted in contemporary reviews. The transaxle design, in combination with a Watt's parallelogram linkage, inboard rear brakes and a well-located de Dion rear suspension, resulted in balanced traction and handling. The front suspension design was unusual in that it incorporated independent longitudinal torsion bar springs acting directly onto the lower wishbones and with separate dampers.

=== Engines ===
| Model | Engine | Volume | Power | Torque | Note |
|---|---|---|---|---|---|
| 1.6 | I4 | 1,570 cc | 109 PS (80 kW; 108 hp) at 5,600 rpm | 142 N⋅m (105 lb⋅ft) at 4,300 rpm | |
| 1.8 | I4 | 1,779 cc | 122 PS (90 kW; 120 hp) at 5,500 rpm | 167 N⋅m (123 lb⋅ft) at 4,400 rpm | |
| 2.0 | I4 | 1,962 cc | 122 PS (90 kW; 120 hp) at 5,300 rpm | 175 N⋅m (129 lb⋅ft) at 4,000 rpm | |
| 2.0 | I4 | 1,962 cc | 130 PS (96 kW; 128 hp) at 5,400 rpm | 178 N⋅m (131 lb⋅ft) at 4,000 rpm | |
| 2.0 Turbo | I4 | 1,962 cc | 150 PS (110 kW; 148 hp) at 5,500 rpm | 231 N⋅m (170 lb⋅ft) at 3,500 rpm | GTV 2000 Turbodelta |
| 2.5 V6 | V6 | 2,492 cc | 160 PS (118 kW; 158 hp) at 5,600 rpm | 213 N⋅m (157 lb⋅ft) at 4,000 rpm | GTV 6 |
| 3.0 V6 | V6 | 2,934 cc | 186 PS (137 kW; 183 hp) at 6,700 rpm | 222 N⋅m (164 lb⋅ft) at 4,300 rpm | GTV 6 3.0 South Africa homologation model |
| 2.5 V6 Twin Turbo | V6 | 2,492 cc | 233 PS (171 kW; 230 hp) at 5,600 rpm | 332 N⋅m (245 lb⋅ft) at 2,500 rpm | GTV 6 Callaway |
| 2.6 V8 | V8 | 2,593 cc | 200 PS (147 kW; 197 hp) at 6,500 rpm | 270 N⋅m (199 lb⋅ft) at 4,750 rpm | GTV8, Autodelta limited edition |
| 2.0 Turbodiesel | I4 | 1,995 cc | 82 PS (60 kW; 81 hp) at 4,300 rpm | 162 N⋅m (119 lb⋅ft) at 2,300 rpm | saloon only |
| 2.4 Turbodiesel | I4 | 2,393 cc | 95 PS (70 kW; 94 hp) at 4,300 rpm | 196 N⋅m (145 lb⋅ft) at 2,300 rpm | saloon only |

== Berlina ==
Alfa Romeo Alfetta Berlina
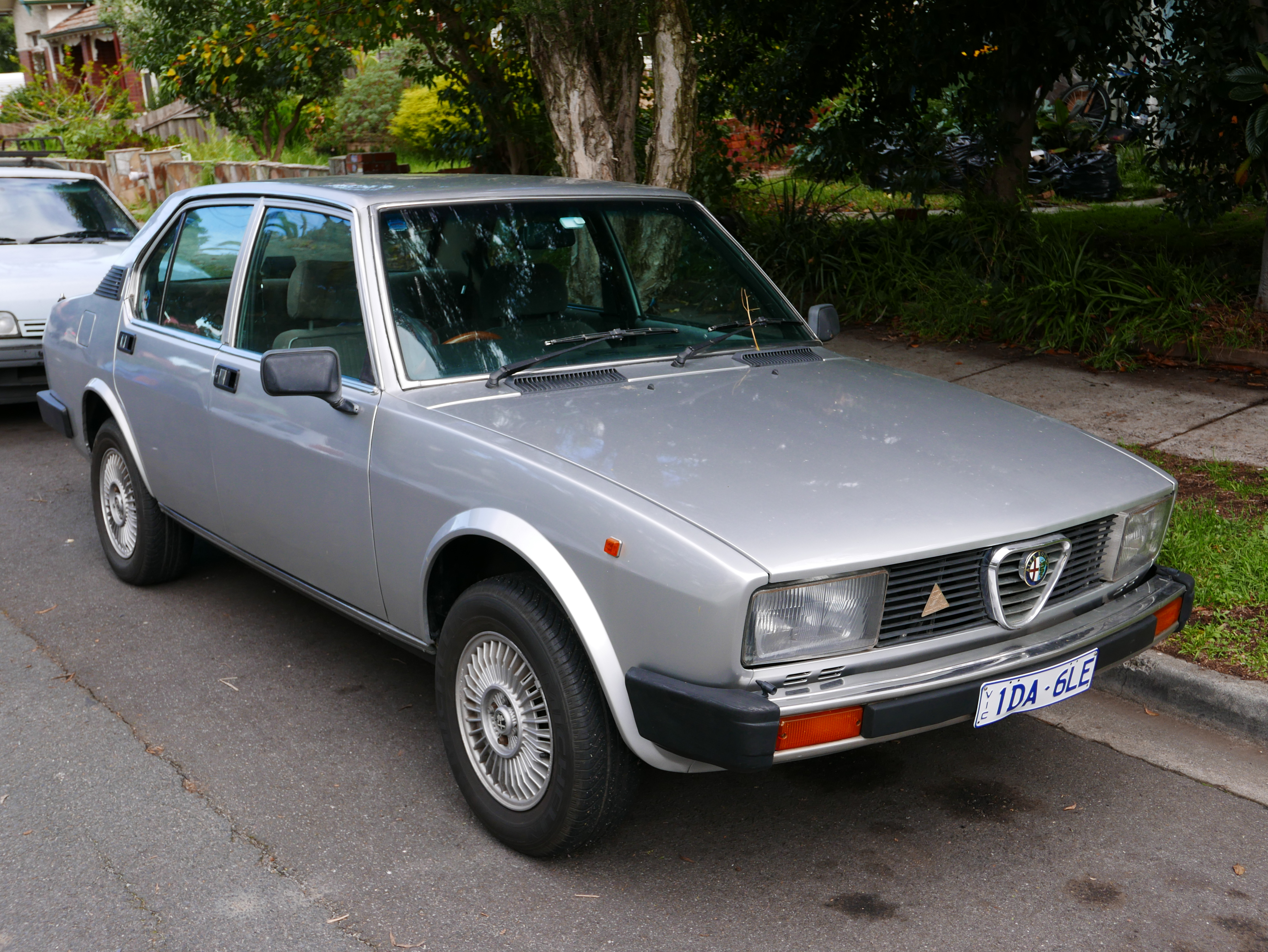

Overview
- Also called: Alfa Romeo 159i (South Africa); Alfa Romeo Sport Sedan (North America)
- Production: 1972–1984
- Designer: Centro Stile Alfa Romeo: Giuseppe Scarnati; Ivo Colucci

Body and chassis
- Class: Executive car
- Body style: 4-door saloon

Powertrain
- Engine: petrol: 1.6 L Twin Cam I4; 1.8 L Twin Cam I4; 2.0 L Twin Cam I4; diesel: 2.0 L VM80A turbodiesel I4; 2.4 L VM81A turbodiesel I4
- Transmission: 5-speed manual 3-speed ZF automatic

Dimensions
- Wheelbase: 2,510 mm (98.8 in)
- Length: 4,280–4,385 mm (168.5–172.6 in)
- Width: 1,620–1,640 mm (63.8–64.6 in)
- Height: 1,430 mm (56.3 in)

Chronology
- Predecessor: Alfa Romeo 1750 and 2000
- Successor: Alfa Romeo 90

=== History ===
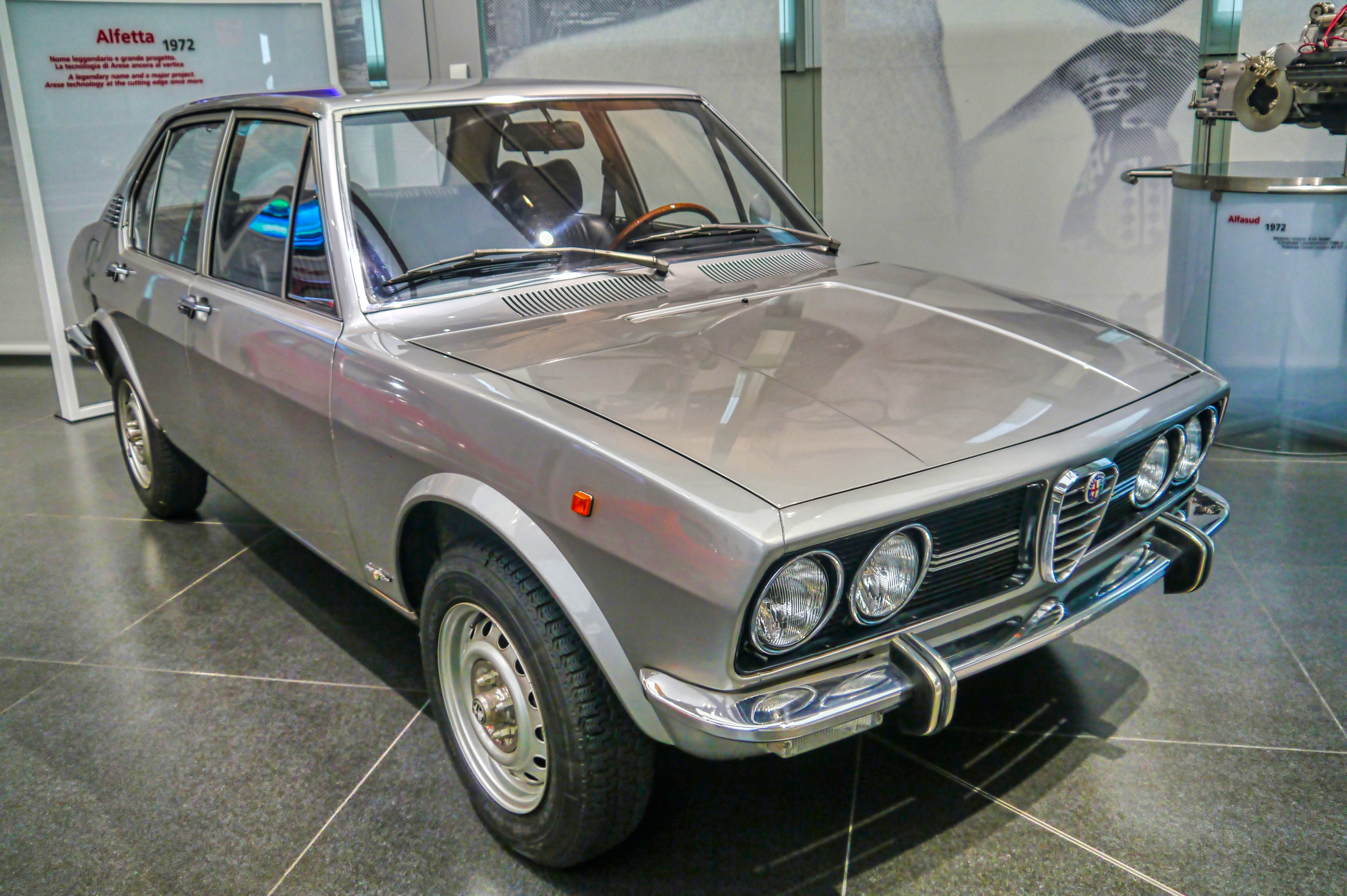
The original Alfetta Berlina at the Alfa Romeo Museum in Arese

The Alfetta saloon was launched in 1972, with a 1.8-litre four-cylinder engine as a three-box, four-door, five-passenger notchback design ("Berlina" in Italian) penned in-house by Centro Stile Alfa Romeo. The front end was characterised by twin, equal-sized headlamps visually connected to a central narrow Alfa Romeo shield by three chrome bars, while the taillights featured three square elements. At the 1975 Brussels Motor Show Alfa Romeo introduced the 1,594 cc (97 cu in), 108 PS (DIN) Alfetta 1.6 base model, distinguished by its single, larger round front headlamps. Meanwhile, the 1.8-litre Alfetta was rebadged Alfetta 1.8 and a few months later mildly restyled, further set apart from the 1.6 by a new grille with a wider central shield and horizontal chrome bars. Engines in both models were Alfa Romeo Twin Cams, with two overhead camshafts, 8-valves and two double-barrel carburettors. Two years later the 1.6 was upgraded to the exterior and interior features of the 1.8 model.

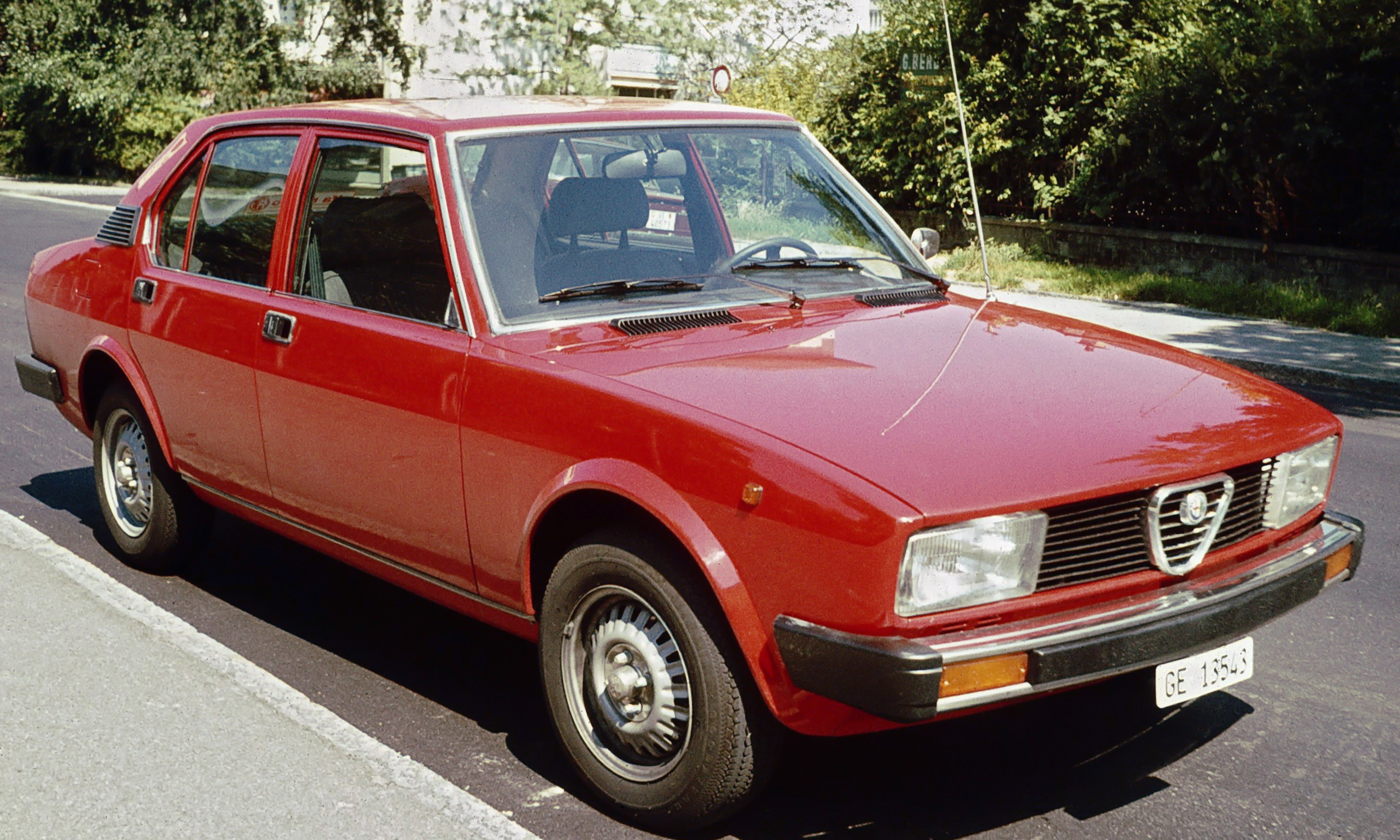
Alfetta 2000 L GLE (1977; first facelift model)

In 1977 a 2.0-litre model was added. Launched at the March Geneva Motor Show, the Alfetta 2000 replaced the outgoing Alfa Romeo 2000. This range-topping Alfetta was 10.5 cm (4.1 in) longer than other models, owing to a redesigned front end with rectangular headlights and larger bumpers with polyurethane inserts; the rectangular tail light clusters and C-pillar vents were revised, as were the dash, steering wheel and upholstery. Just a year later, in July 1978, the two-litre model was updated becoming the Alfetta 2000 L. Engine output rose from 122 PS (90 kW; 120 hp) to 130 PS (96 kW; 128 hp); with revised upholstery and simulated wood dash. The Alfetta 2000 was marketed as the Alfa Romeo Sport Sedan in the United States, where "Alfetta" name had less recognition than Europe. The 2000 received fuel injection in 1979.

A turbodiesel version was introduced in late 1979, the Alfetta Turbo D, whose engine was supplied by VM Motori. Apart from a boot lid badge, the Turbo D was equipped and finished like the top-of-the-line 2000 L both outside and inside. Therefore, it received a tachometer, but no standard power steering, despite an additional 100 kg (220 lb) carried by the front axle. The turbodiesel engine, a first on an Alfa Romeo's passenger car, displaced 2.0 litres and produced 82 PS (60 kW; 81 hp). The Alfetta Turbo D was marketed mostly in Italy and in France, as well as a few other continental European markets with a favorable tax structure.

In 1981, Alfa Romeo developed a semi-experimental Alfetta model in collaboration with the University of Genoa, fitted with a modular variable displacement engine and an electronic engine control unit. This model was called the Alfetta CEM (Controllo Elettronico del Motore, or Electronic Engine Management), it was shown at the Frankfurt Motor Show. The 130 PS (96 kW; 128 bhp) 2.0-litre modular engine featured fuel injection and ignition systems governed by an engine control unit, which could shut off two out of four cylinders as needed in order to reduce fuel consumption. An initial batch of ten examples were assigned to taxi drivers in Milan, to verify operation and performance in real-world situations. According to Alfa Romeo, during these tests cylinder deactivation was found to reduce fuel consumption by 12% in comparison to a CEM fuel-injected engine without variable displacement, and almost by 25% in comparison to the regular production carburetted 2.0-litre engines. In 1983 after the first trial, a small series of 1,000 examples was put on sale, offered to selected clients; 991 examples were ultimately produced. Despite this second experimental phase, the project development ended.

Fuel injected, US-specification versions of the Alfetta were sold as limited editions in some European countries; one example was the 1981 Alfetta LI America for the Italian market, based on the North American Sport Sedan.

In November 1981, the updated "Alfetta '82" range was launched, comprising 1.6, 1.8, 2.0 and 2.0 Turbo Diesel models. All variants adopted the bodyshell and interior of the 2.0-litre models; standard equipment became richer. All models in this range had black plastic rubbing strips, side sill mouldings, tail light surround and hubcaps; the 2000 sported a satin silver grille and a simulated mahogany steering wheel rim.

July 1982 saw the introduction of the range topping Alfetta Quadrifoglio Oro (meaning Gold Cloverleaf, a trim designation already used on the Alfasud), which took the place of the then discontinued 2000 L. The Quadrifoglio Oro was powered by a 128 PS (94 kW; 126 hp) (DIN) version of the usual 1,962 cc engine, equipped with the SPICA mechanical fuel injection used on US-spec Alfettas; standard equipment included several digital and power-assisted accessories like a trip computer, check control panel and electrically adjustable seats. Visually the Quadrifoglio Oro was distinguished by twin round headlights, concave alloy wheels, and was only available in metallic grey or brown with brown interior plastics and specific beige velour upholstery.

Production numbers by model
| Version | Years | Produced |
|---|---|---|
| Alfetta | 1972–74 | 104,454 |
| Alfetta (RHD) | 1972–78 | 2,011 |
| Alfetta 1.8 | 1975–83 | 67,738 |
| Alfetta 1.6 | 1975–83 | 77,103 |
| Alfetta 2000 | 1976–77 | 34,733 |
| Alfetta 2000 (RHD) | 1977 | 1,450 |
| Alfetta 2000 L | 1978–80 | 60,097 |
| Alfetta 2.0 | 1981–84 | 48,750 |
| Alfetta 2.0 LI America | 1978–81 | 1,000 |
| Alfetta 2000 Turbo Diesel | 1979–84 | 23,530 |
| Alfetta Quadrifoglio Oro | 1982–84 | 19,340 |
| Alfetta CEM | 1983 | 991 |
| Alfetta 2.4 Turbo Diesel | 1983–84 | 7,220 |
| Total | | 448,417 |

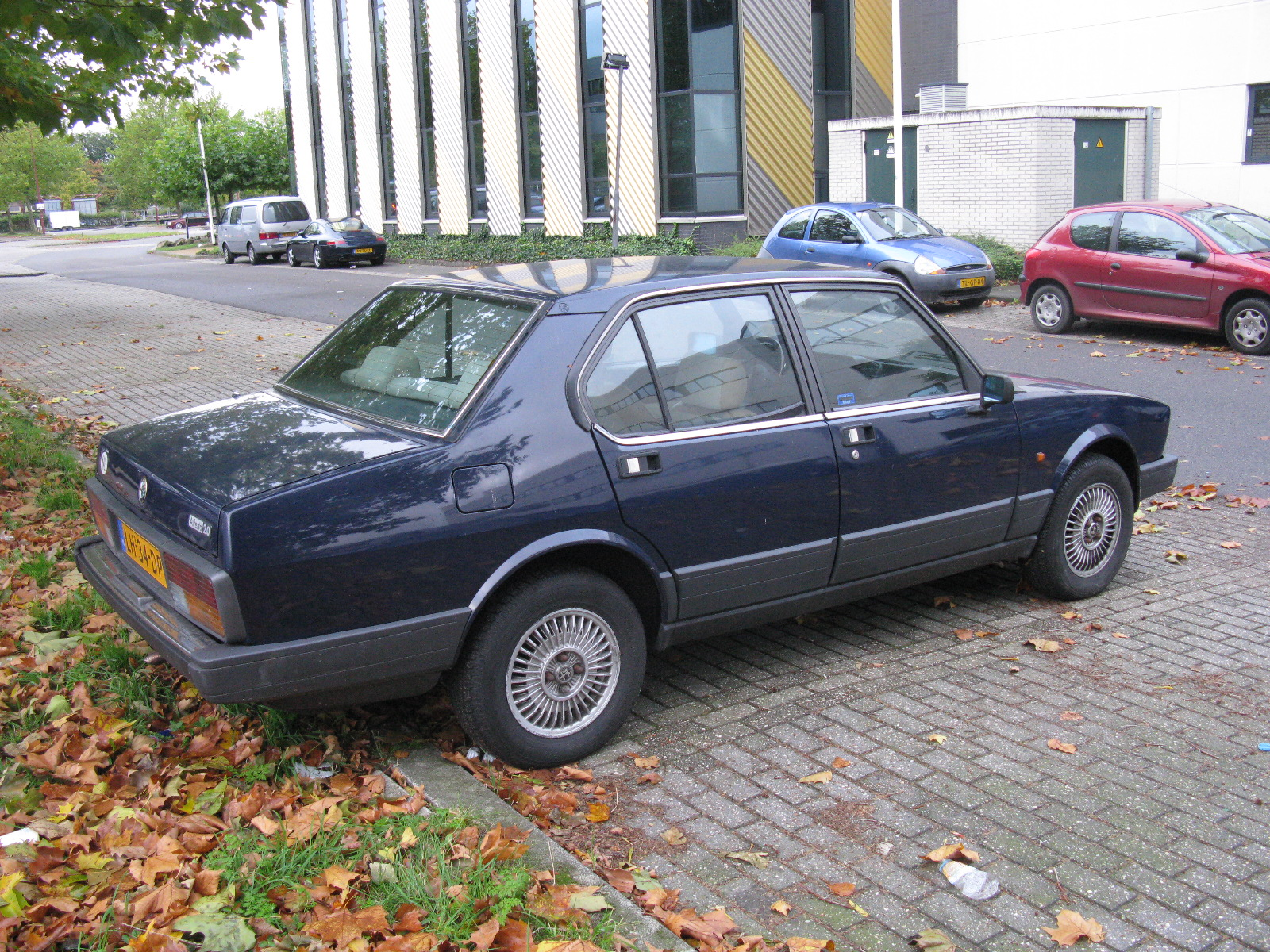
1983 Alfetta 2.0 (final facelift)

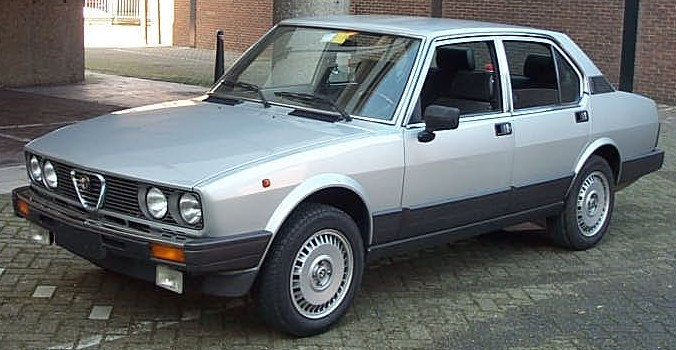
1983–84 Alfetta Quadrifoglio Oro (final facelift)

In March 1983, the Alfetta received its third and final facelift; the exterior was modernised with newly designed bumpers (integrating a front spoiler and extending to the wheel openings), a new grille, lower body plastic cladding, silver hubcaps and, at the rear, a full-width grey plastic fascia supporting rectangular tail lights with ribbed lenses and the number plate. The C-pillar ventilation outlets were moved to each side of the rear window. Inside there were a redesigned dashboard and instrumentation, new door panels and the check control panel from the Quadrifoglio Oro on all models. Top of the range models adopted an overhead console, which extended for the full length of the roof and housed three reading spot lamps, a central ceiling light, and controls for the electric windows. Alongside the facelift two new models were introduced: the 2.4-litre Turbo Diesel, which in most markets gradually replaced the previous 2.0-litre which was instead installed in the marginally smaller Giulietta. There was also a renewed two-litre Quadrifoglio Oro, equipped with electronic fuel injection. Thanks to the Bosch Motronic integrated electronic fuel injection and ignition the QO had the same 130 PS (96 kW; 128 hp) output of the carburetted 2.0, while developing more torque and being more fuel efficient.

In April 1984 the successor of the Alfetta debuted, the larger Alfa Romeo 90. At the end of the year the Alfetta Berlina went out of production, after nearly 450,000 had been made over a 12-year production period.

=== Official use ===
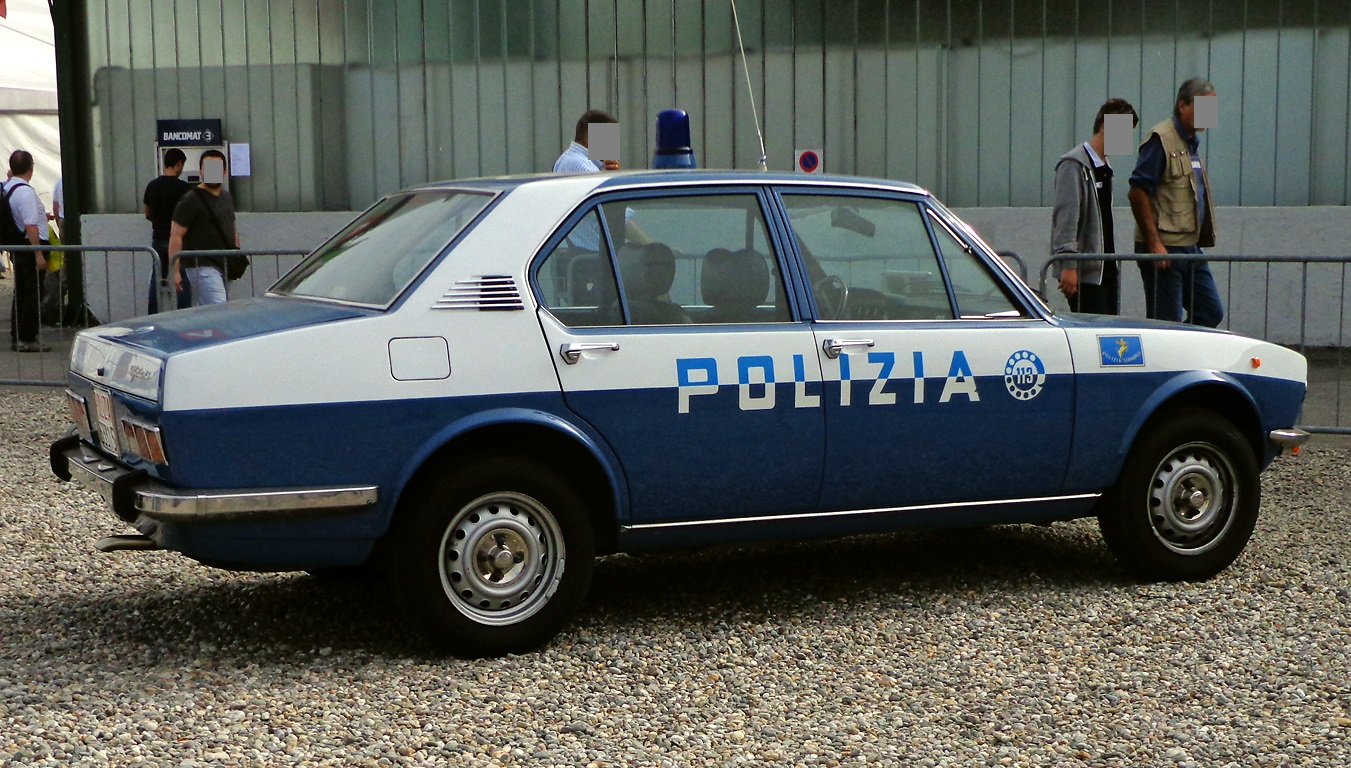
Alfa Romeo Alfetta police car of the Italian Polizia di Stato

The Alfa Romeo Alfetta was used as police car by the Carabinieri as well as by Polizia di Stato. It became well known throughout the world since it was Italian former Prime Minister Aldo Moro's official escort car when he was kidnapped by the Red Brigades.

=== Production and marketing ===
==== South African market ====
South African models were first assembled at the Rosslyn manufacturing plant located outside Pretoria. These early 1973 models were manufactured alongside Datsuns. From 1974 South African Alfettas were manufactured at Alfa Romeo's own Brits plant. The 1600 model, with single headlamps as in Europe, arrived to complement the 1800 and 2000 in mid-1976. Beginning in October 1982, the Quadrifoglio Oro model was marketed as the Alfa Romeo 159i, with the fuel injected two-litre engine.

==== North American market ====
The four-door Alfetta was sold in the United States from 1975 through 1977 under the name "Alfetta Sedan". From 1978 to 1979 a mildly restyled version was sold under the name "Sport Sedan"; this design was also offered in Italy as the "Alfetta 2.0 LI America".

== GT ==
Alfa Romeo Alfetta GT and GTV; Alfa Romeo GTV and GTV6
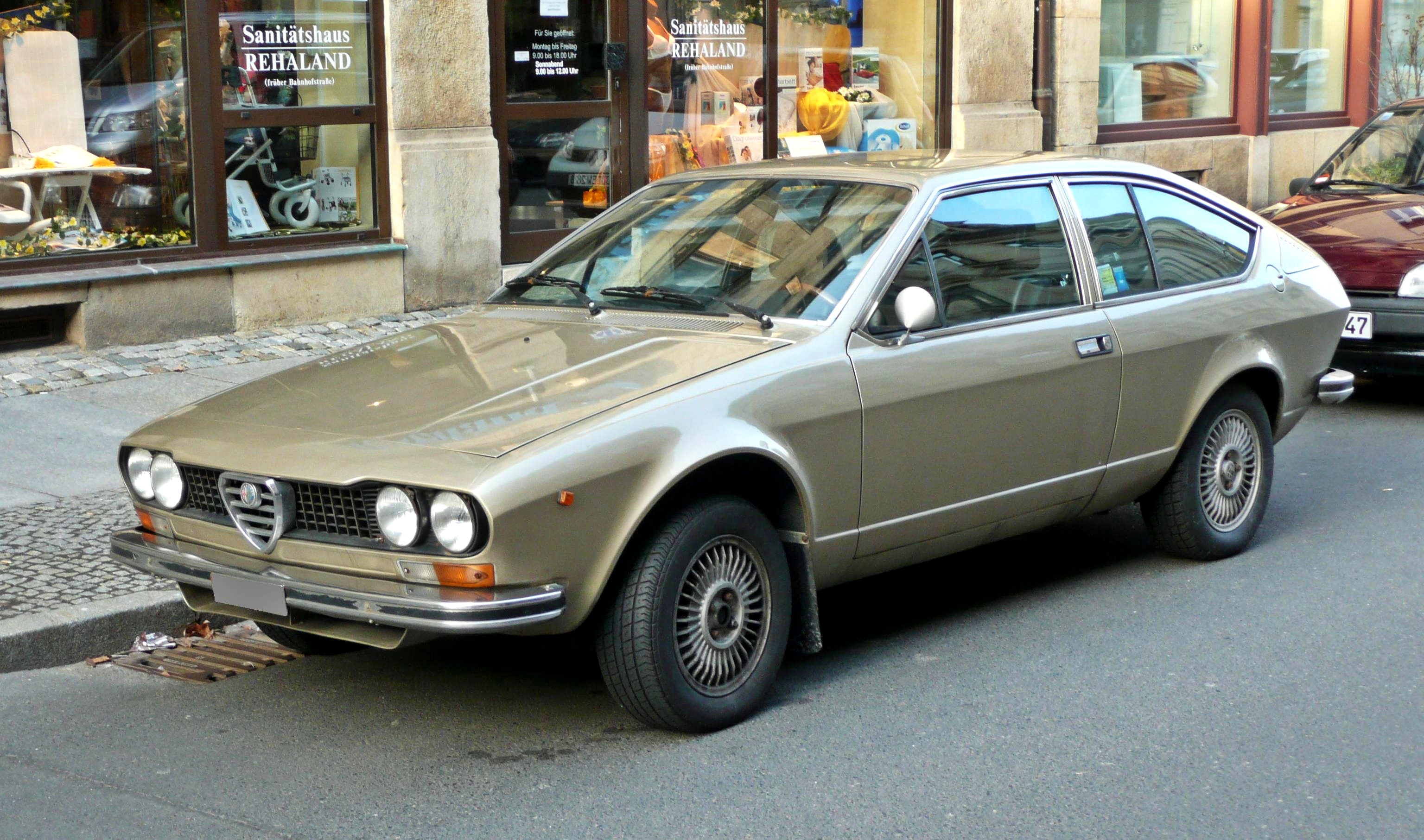
- Alfetta GT 1.6

Overview
- Also called: Alfa Romeo Sprint Veloce (USA)
- Production: 1974–1987
- Designer: Giorgetto Giugiaro at Italdesign (initial design); Ermanno Cressoni of Centro Stile Alfa Romeo (final design)

Body and chassis
- Class: Grand tourer (S)
- Body style: 2-door fastback coupé

Powertrain
- Engine: petrol: 1.6 L Twin Cam I4; 1.8 L Twin Cam I4; 2.0 L Twin Cam I4; 2.0 L Twin Cam turbo I4; 2.5 L Alfa Romeo V6; 2.6 L Autodelta V8; 3.0 L Alfa Romeo V6
- Transmission: 5-speed manual

Dimensions
- Wheelbase: 2,400 mm (94.5 in)
- Length: 4,190–4,260 mm (165.0–167.7 in)
- Width: 1,664 mm (65.5 in)
- Height: 1,330 mm (52.4 in)
- Kerb weight: 1,110 kg (2,447 lb) (GTV 2.0); 1,210 kg (2,668 lb) (GTV 6 2.5)

Chronology
- Predecessor: Alfa Romeo 105/115 Series Coupés
- Successor: Alfa Romeo GTV (916)

=== Alfetta GT and GTV ===
The Alfetta saloon was the base for the Alfetta GT, a 2-door, 4-seater fastback coupé designed by Giorgetto Giugiaro at Italdesign. Introduced in 1974, similarly to the saloon it was initially available only with the 1.8 litres (1,779 cc) version of the Alfa Romeo Twin Cam engine. These engines featured a chain driven 8-valve twin overhead cam cylinder head of cross-flow design. In 1976, with the final phasing out of the earlier 105 Series (GT 1300 Junior and GT 1600 Junior and 2000 GTV), the model range of the Alfetta GT was expanded; the 1.8-litre engine was discontinued in favour of the 1.6-litre (1,570 cc) Alfetta GT 1.6 and 2.0-litre (1,962 cc) Alfetta GTV 2.0. At the same time some updates were introduced, such as a new front grille with horizontal slats and two series of vents beneath it. The GTV was distinguished from the 1.6 version by twin chrome whiskers in the grille and GTV scripts carved in the ventilation vents on the C-pillar.

In 1979, some minor revisions, including a revised engine with new camshaft profiles and a change to mechanical-and-vacuum ignition advance, saw the 2.0-litre redesignated the Alfetta GTV 2000L. Autodelta also introduced a limited edition 2.0-litre turbocharged model, named Turbodelta, of which 400 were made for FIA Group 4 homologation. This version used a KKK turbocharger which pushed power up to 175 PS (129 kW; 173 hp). The car also received a modified suspension layout. This was the first Italian petrol production car with a turbocharger.

The styling of the GTV, while distinctive, can be seen to share many design features derived from the Montreal, as translated down to a simpler and thus more marketable vehicle. Examples of this are the bonnet line, which while briefer, still has 'scallops' for the headlights, and the tail light clusters which resemble those of the Montreal. The door shape is similar, and in a sharing of parts, both vehicles employ the same door handles.

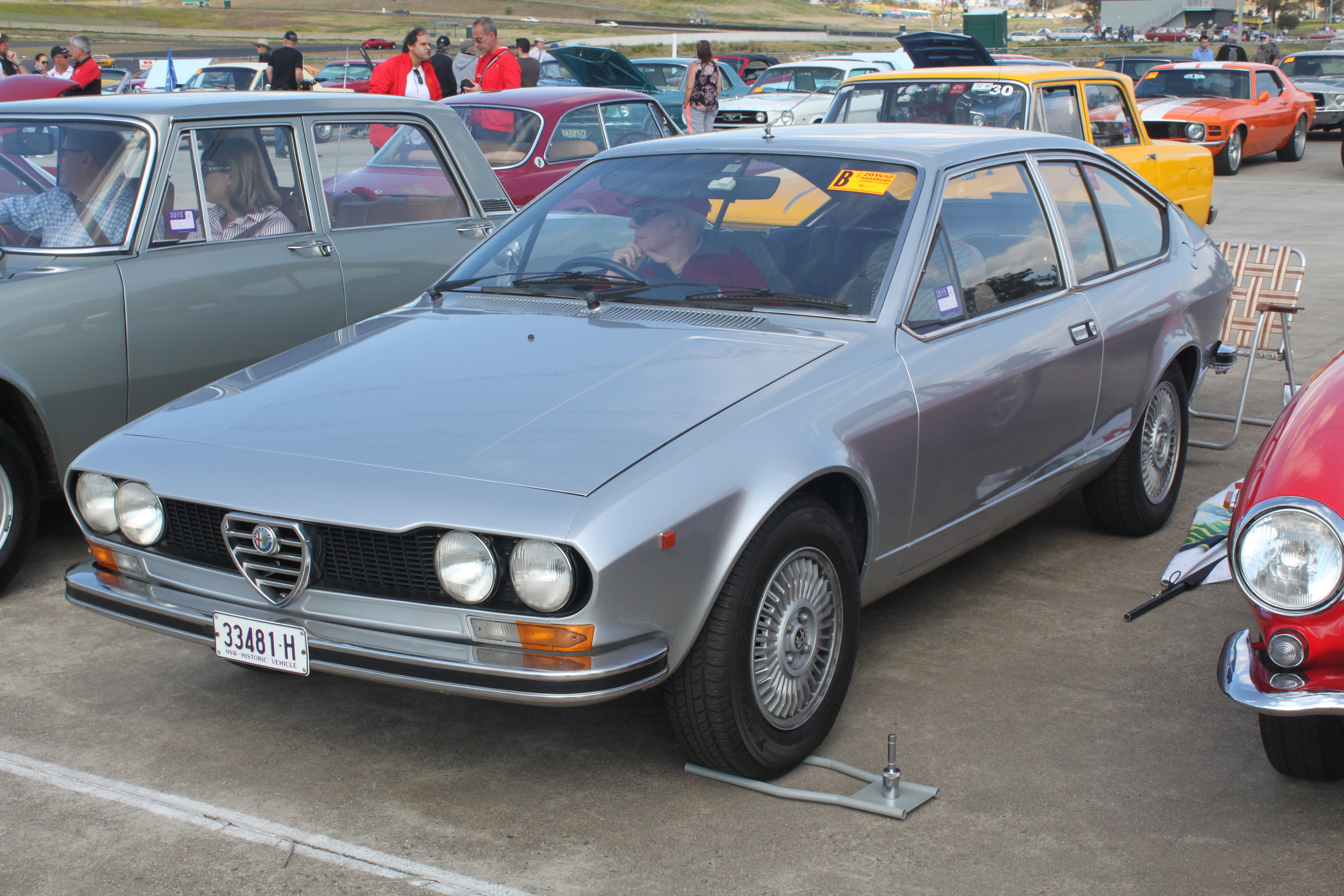
Alfetta GT

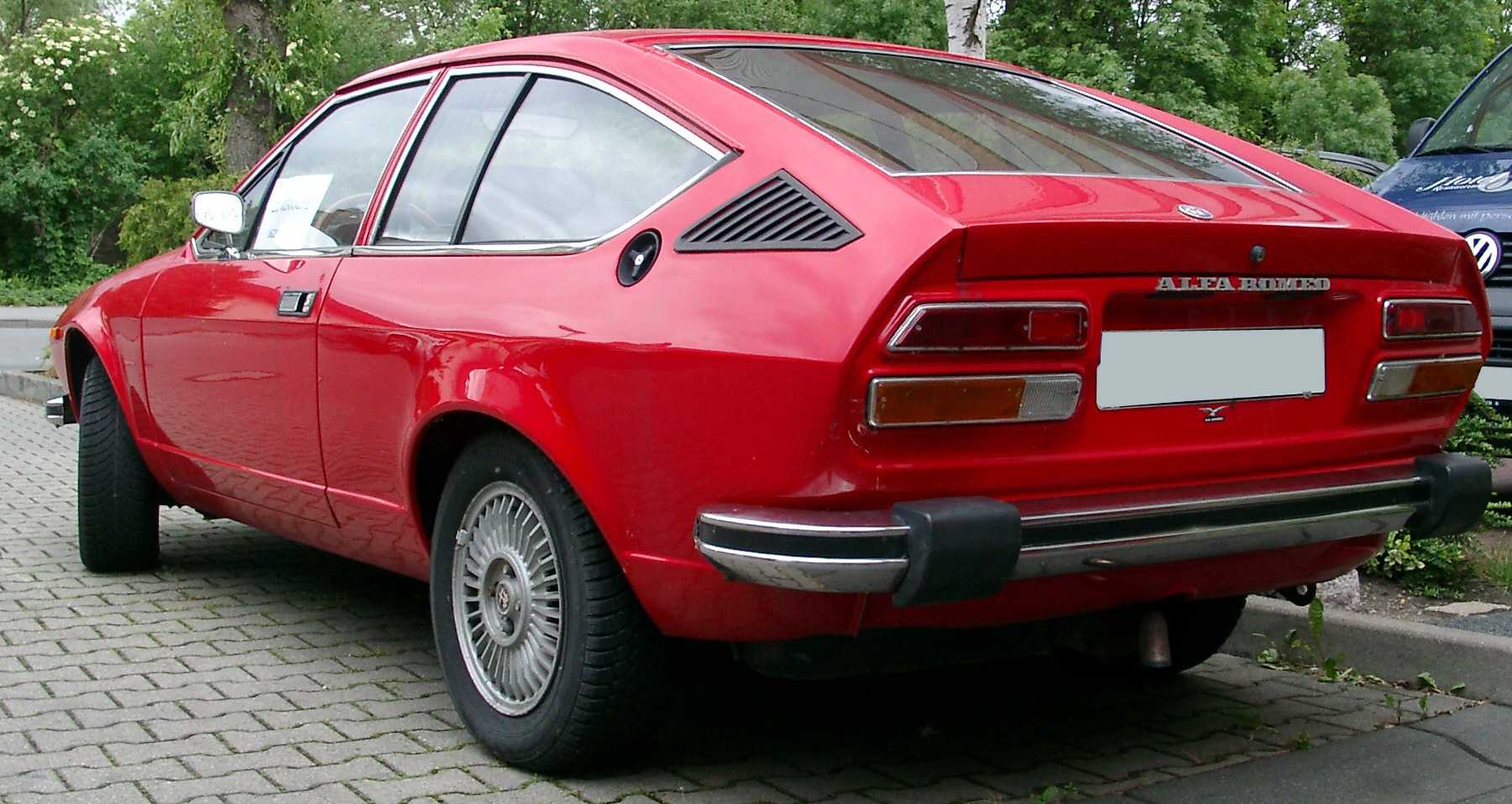
Rear view of an Alfetta GTV

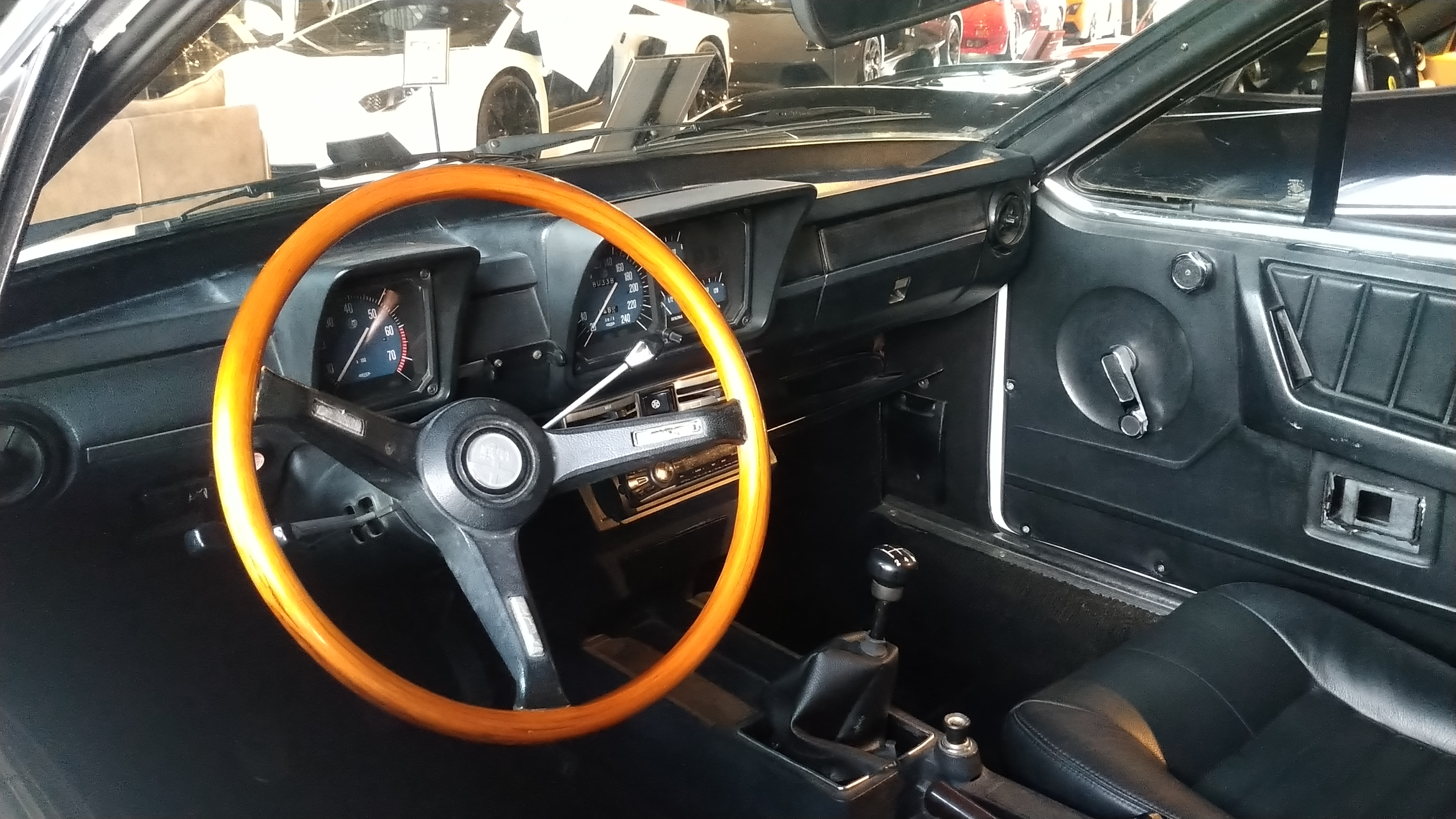
Alfetta GT interior

=== GTV 2.0 and GTV6 ===
In 1980, the GT received a restyling. Outside there were new one-piece taillights, grey plastic bumpers, C-pillar vents and side skirts; all bright stainless steel save for the Alfa Romeo triangular grille was changed to matte-black trim. The 1.6-litre version was discontinued and the Alfetta GTV became known simply as Alfa Romeo GTV 2.0; the Alfetta name was dropped, but the two-litre coupé retained its type designation of 116.36 for left-hand drive and 116.37 for right-hand drive. 15-inch disc-shaped alloy wheels and Pirelli Cinturato CN36 tyres were now standard, as opposed to the earlier cars' 14-inch pressed steel or optional 14-inch alloy units.

Later in the same year, the GTV 6 2.5, a version of the GTV with the SOHC 2.5 L V6 engine from the Alfa Romeo Alfa 6 luxury saloon, was released. As a result, the hood received a bulge to clear the top of the intake and became its most pronounced feature. With Bosch L-Jetronic fuel injection instead of the six downdraught Dell'Orto carburettors in the early Alfa 6 application, the V6 was much easier to start and retained its state of tune much better. The fuel injected engine was also able to meet the strict emissions standards introduced in Switzerland (shared with Sweden) for 1983. The V6 received rave reviews from the motoring press, which had previously lambasted the same engine in the Alfa 6 because of the carburettor problems. The fuel injection eventually made it into the second series of the Alfa 6 as well. The GTV went through a number of revisions, including new gear ratios and an updated interior in 1984.

The GTV 6 was also a fairly successful racing car; the 116 type chassis developed for racing since its first outing in the 1974 San Martino di Castrozza rallye. The racing successes included winning the European Touring Car Championship an unprecedented four years in succession (1982–85), the British Touring Car Championship in 1983 driven by Andy Rouse, as well as many other racing and rallying competitions in national championships as France and Italy. A Group A GTV 6 driven by French driver Yves Loubet won French Supertouring Championship in succession from 1983 to 1984, and Yves Loubet won the third position in the Tour de Corse of 1986 round of the World Rally Championship.

The GTV 6 Grand-Prix was introduced in 1985 in some European markets (most notably Switzerland and Germany). It featured a body kit designed by Rayton Fissore.

A GTV 6 was driven to victory by Greg Carr and Fred Gocentas in the 1987 Australian Rally Championship.

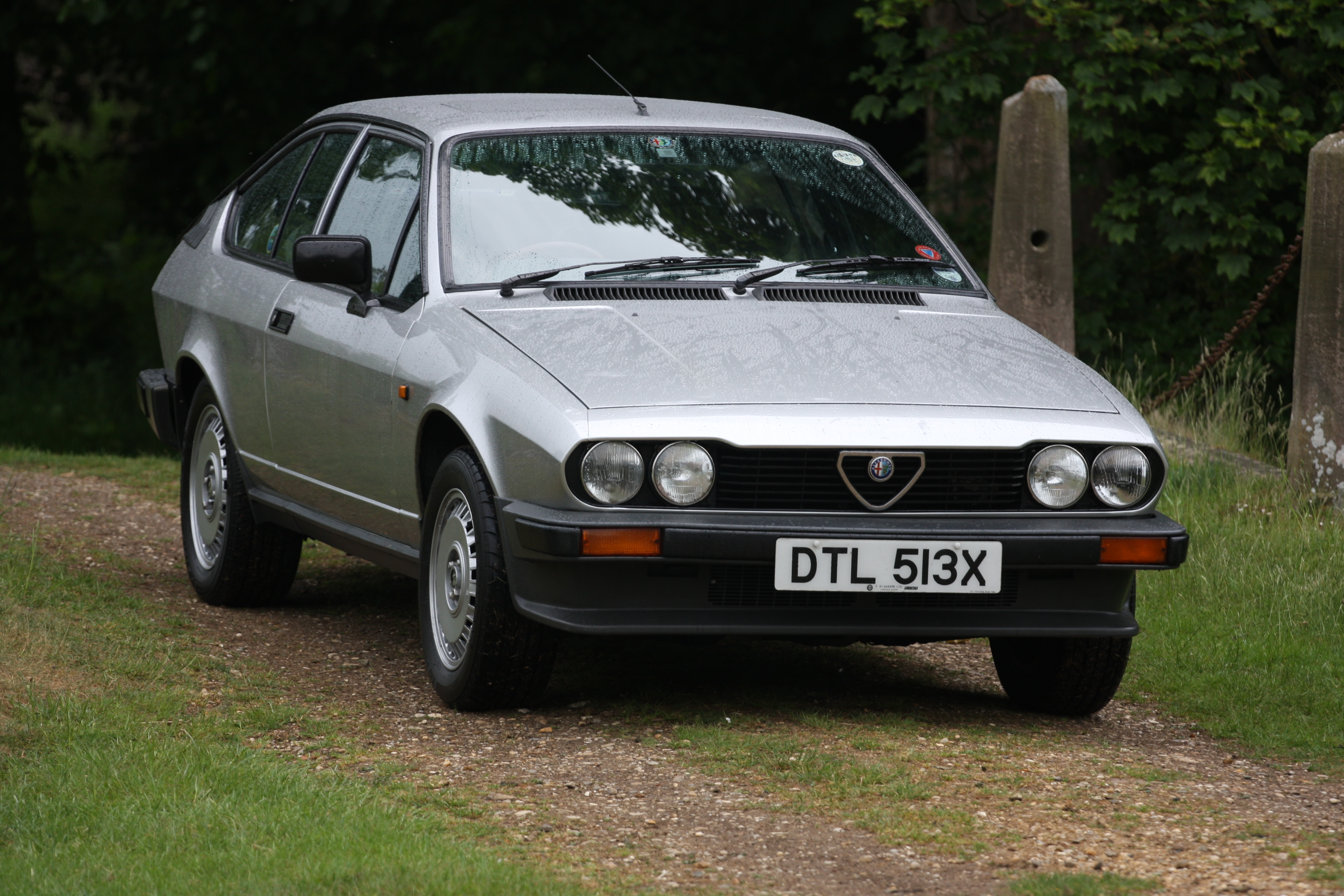
Alfa Romeo GTV 2.0

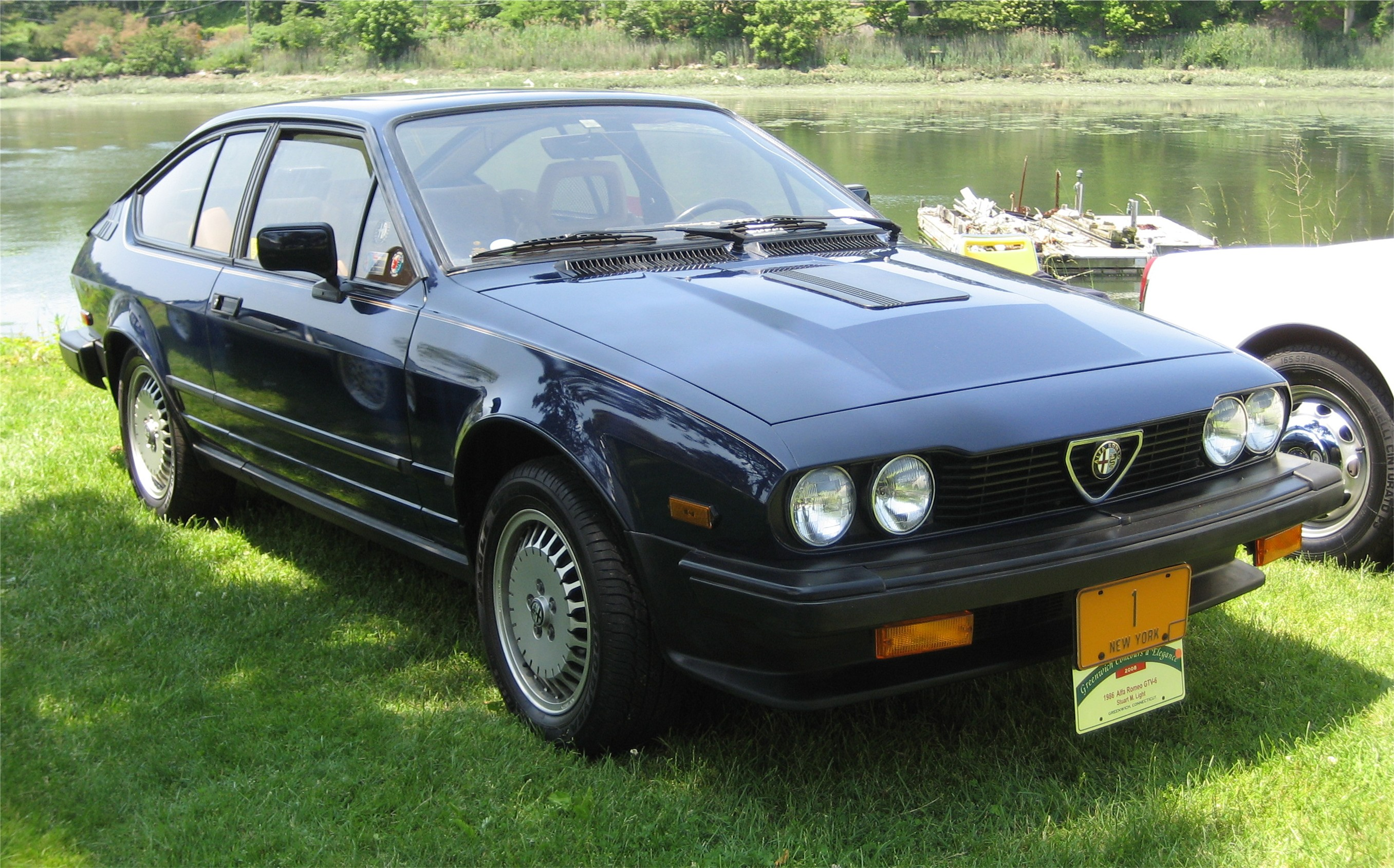
Alfa Romeo GTV6 2.5

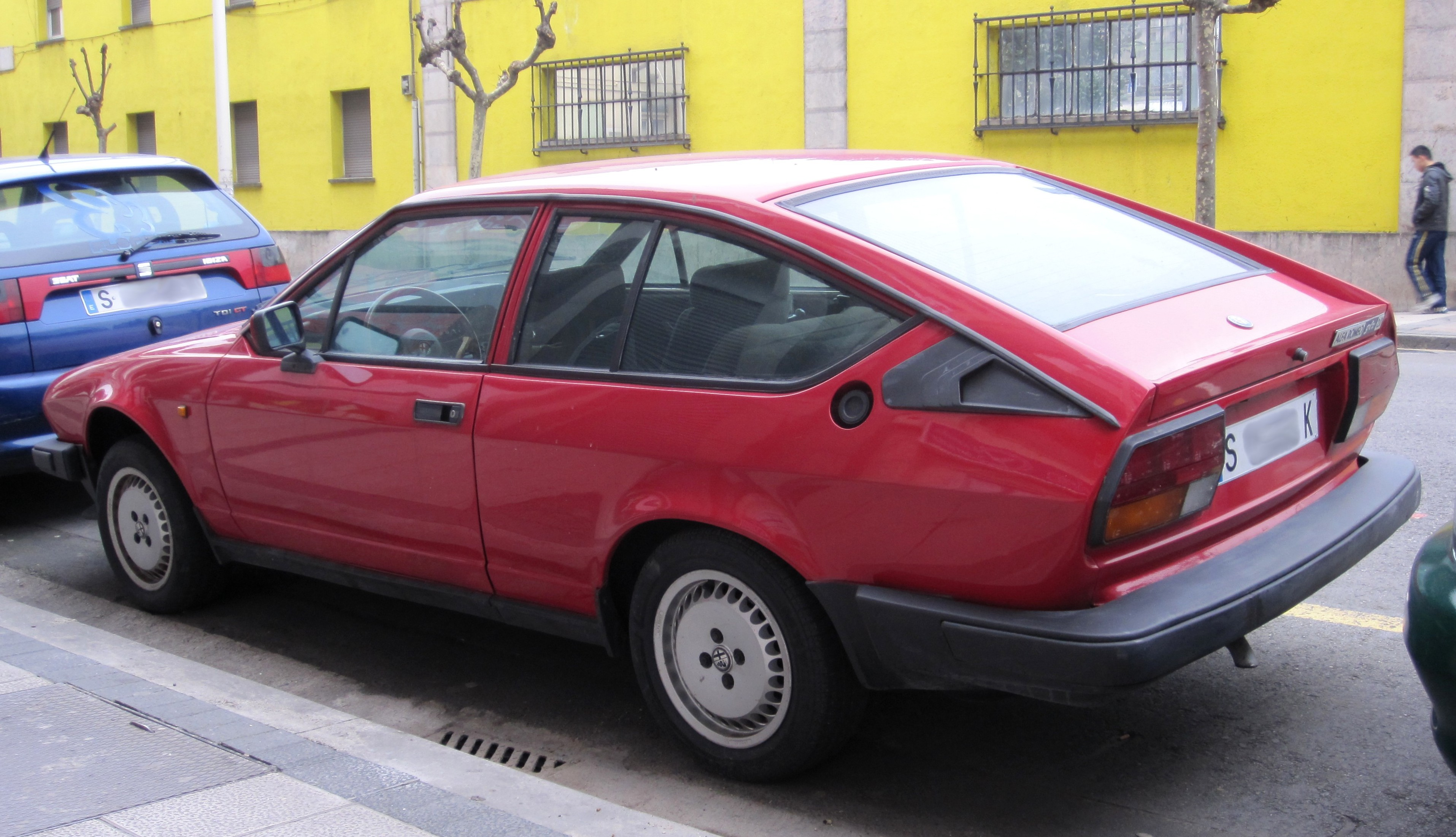
Rear view of a GTV 2.0

| Version | Years | Produced |
|---|---|---|
| Alfetta GT (1.8) | 1974–76 | 21,947 |
| Alfetta GT (1.6) | 1976–80 | 16,923 |
| Alfetta GTV (2.0) | 1976–78 | 31,267 |
| Alfetta GTS (1.6) | 1976–80 | |
| Alfetta GTV Strada (2.0) | 1976–80 | |
| Alfetta GTV 8 2.6 | 1977 | 20 |
| Alfetta GTV L (2.0) | 1978–80 | 26,108 |
| Alfetta GTV 2000 America | 1979–80 | |
| Alfetta 2000 Turbodelta | 1979–80 | 400 |
| GTV 2.0 | 1980–83 | 10,352 |
| GTV 2.0 | 1983–87 | 7,296 |
| GTV 2.0 Grand Prix | 1981–82 | 650 |
| GTV 6 2.5 | 1980–83 | 11,468 |
| GTV 6 2.5 | 1983–87 | 10,912 |
| GTV 6 3.0 V6 | 1984–85 | 212 |
| GTV 6 2.5 Twin Turbo | 1985–86 | 36 |
| Total | | 137,579 |

=== South African market ===
South African models were first assembled at the Rosslyn manufacturing plant, located outside Pretoria. These early 1973 models were manufactured alongside Datsuns. From 1974 South African Alfettas were manufactured at Alfa Romeo's own Brits plant. The GTV6 2.5 arrived in 1982; while Brits was gearing up to assemble them, 100 fully built-up cars were brought in from Italy. These received a numbered plaque on the front wheel arch, just ahead of the door. South Africa was one of two markets to have a turbocharged GTV 6, with a Garrett turbocharger and a NACA intake. An estimated 750 were assembled before all local Alfa production ceased in 1986. The South African market also introduced the 3.0 L GTV-6, predating the international debut of the factory's 3.0 L engine in 1987. 212 were built in South Africa for racing homologation. The last six GTV-6 3.0s were fuel injected.

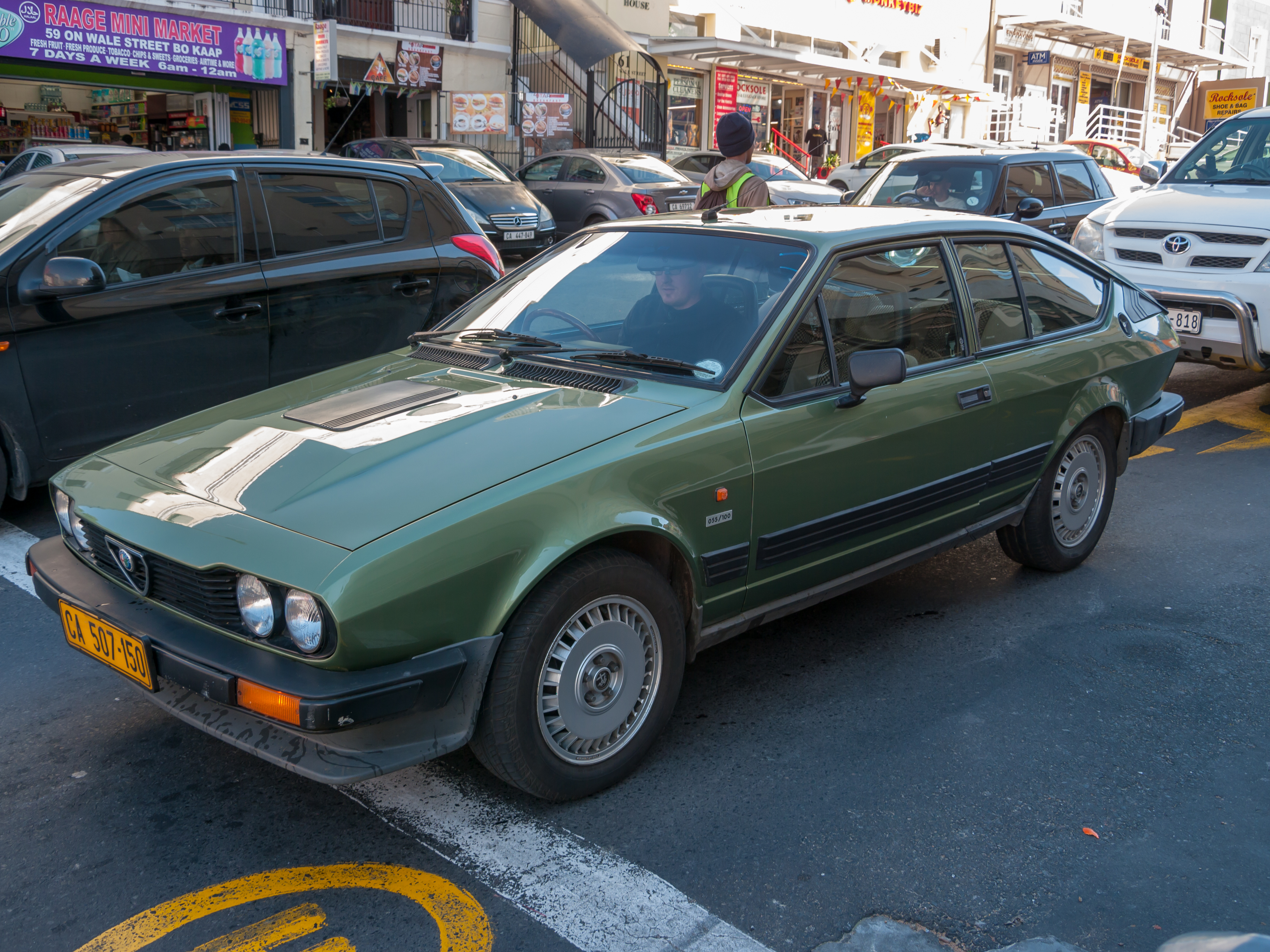
The first 100 GTV6 2.5 sold in South Africa in 1982 were imported fully built-up. This is #55.

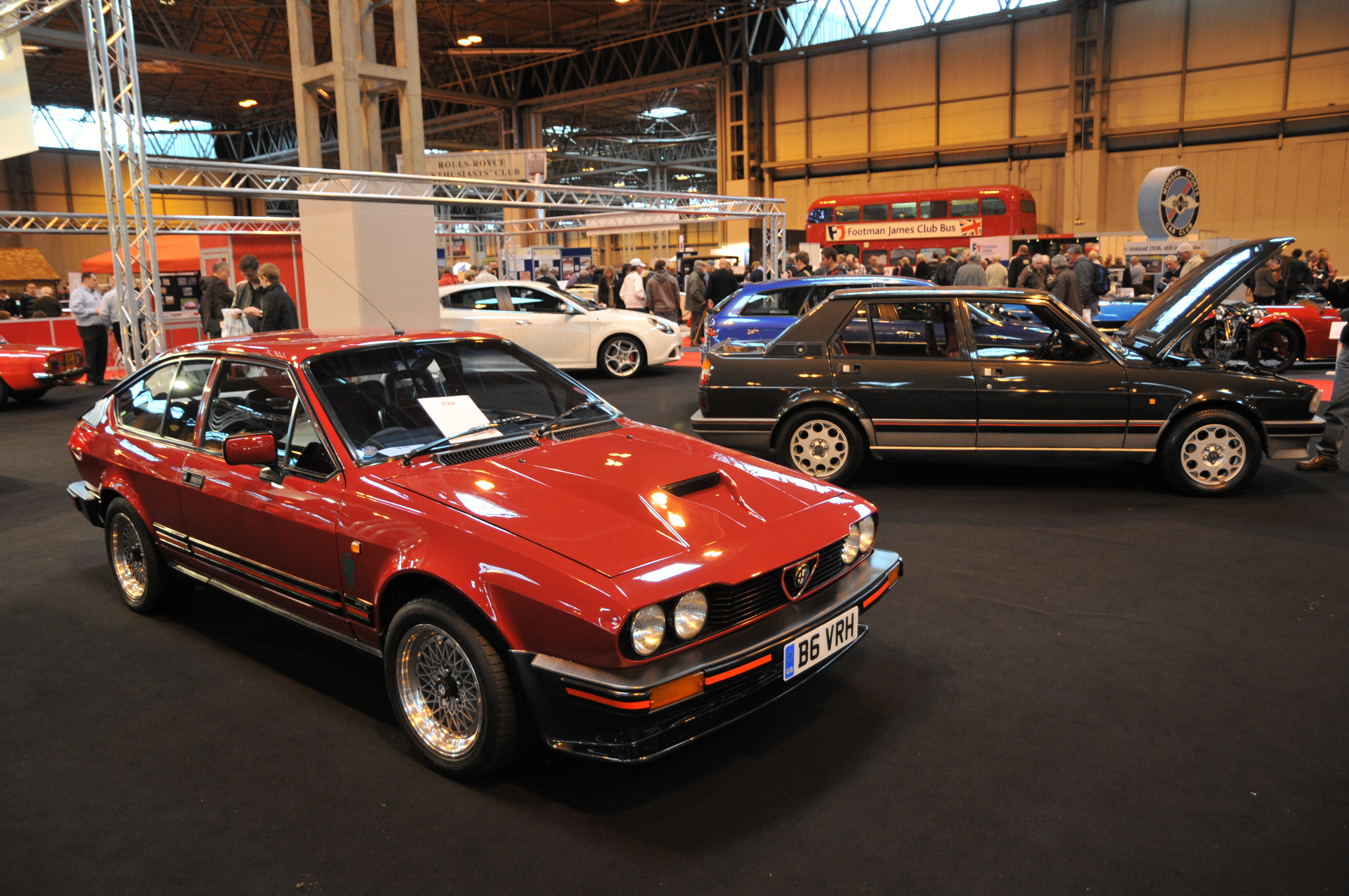
South African GTV6 3.0, with a different bonnet from the 2.5 V6.

==== GTV 6 3.0 ====
The GTV 6 3.0 was billed as the most powerful production sports car ever built by Alfa Romeo. The car was a co-operative effort by Alfa Romeo South Africa and Autodelta. It was developed mainly for racing, so only 200 had to be built for homologation. To compete with the BMW 535i, with a 3.5-litre engine, a new 3-litre variant of the V6 engine was installed. It won its debut race in the Lodge Group One International two-hour race at Kyalami 1983 and after that it took 1st and 2nd place in the Group One class of the Castrol three-hour race at Killarney and Index victory at the World Endurance Championship 1000 km Race at Kyalami in December 1983. The engine displacement is 2,934 cc, with bore and stroke both increased to 93 mm × 72 mm (3.66 in × 2.83 in). The fuel injection was replaced by six Dell'Orto carburettors (as used on the Alfa 6), as the aim was low-end torque rather than peak power. Power increased to 136.7 kW (185.9 PS; 183.3 hp) at 6,700 rpm. The gearing was lowered but the 3.0 still reached a higher top speed of 224.2 km/h (139.3 mph). Acceleration times are 8.36 seconds from 0–100 km/h and 7.2 seconds for 0–60 mph. On the outside, the different induction system of the GTV6 3.0 required a new fiberglass bonnet with a prominent bulge.

=== North American market ===
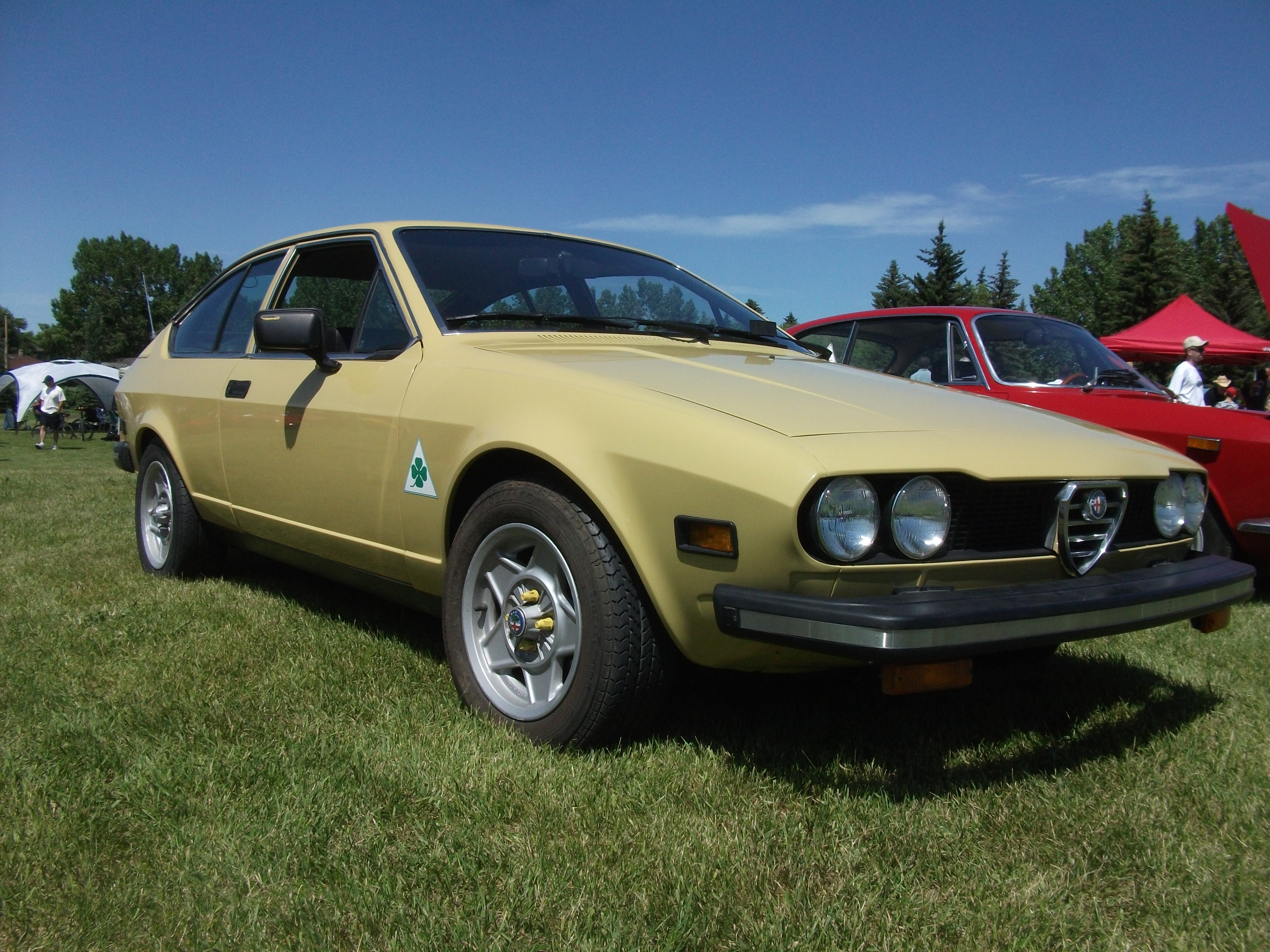
The Alfetta GT received a few different types of federalized bumpers; this is the 1976 model.

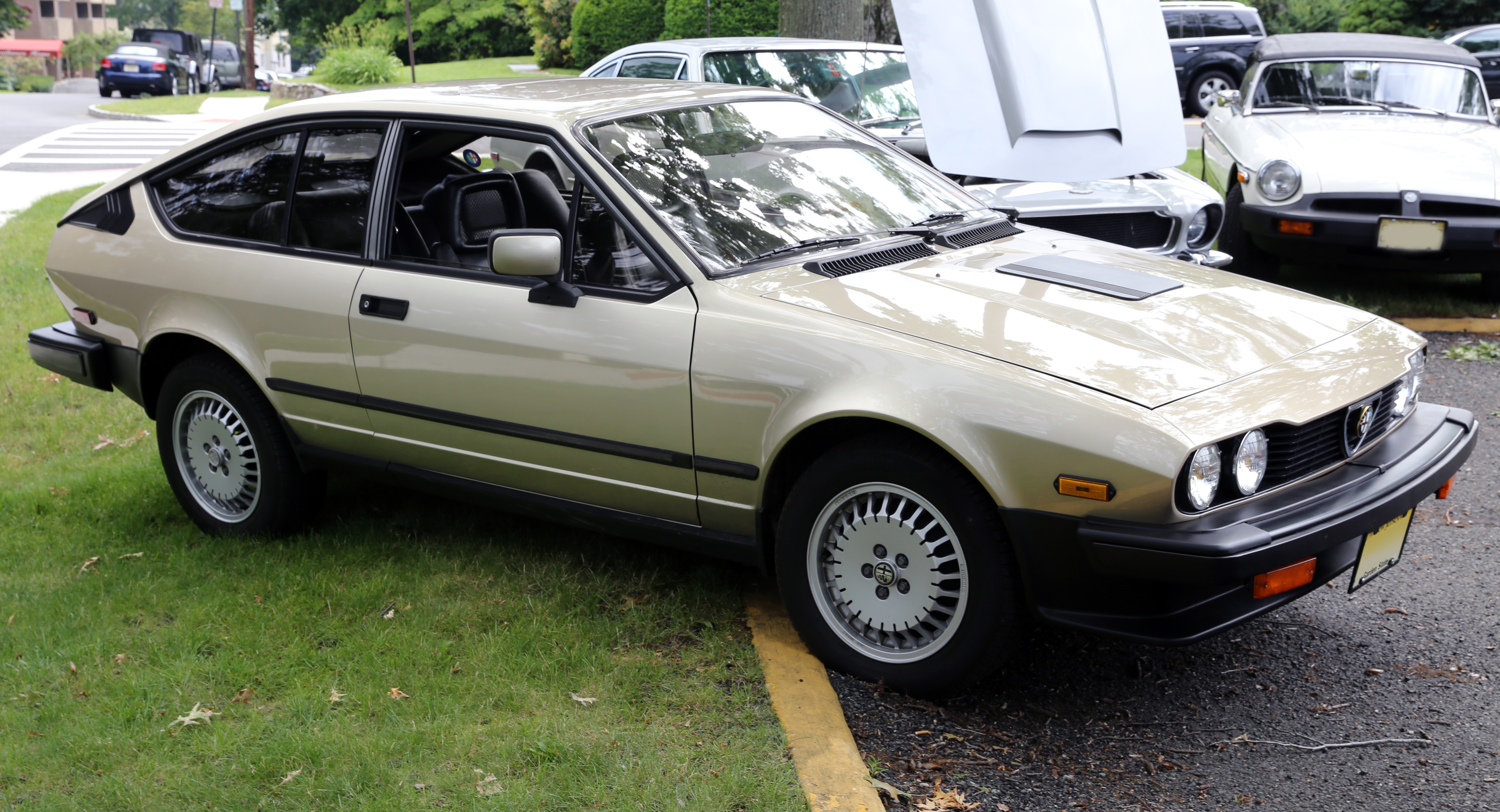
The federalized GTV 6 received the tipo 116.69 model code and can be recognized by its larger bumpers.

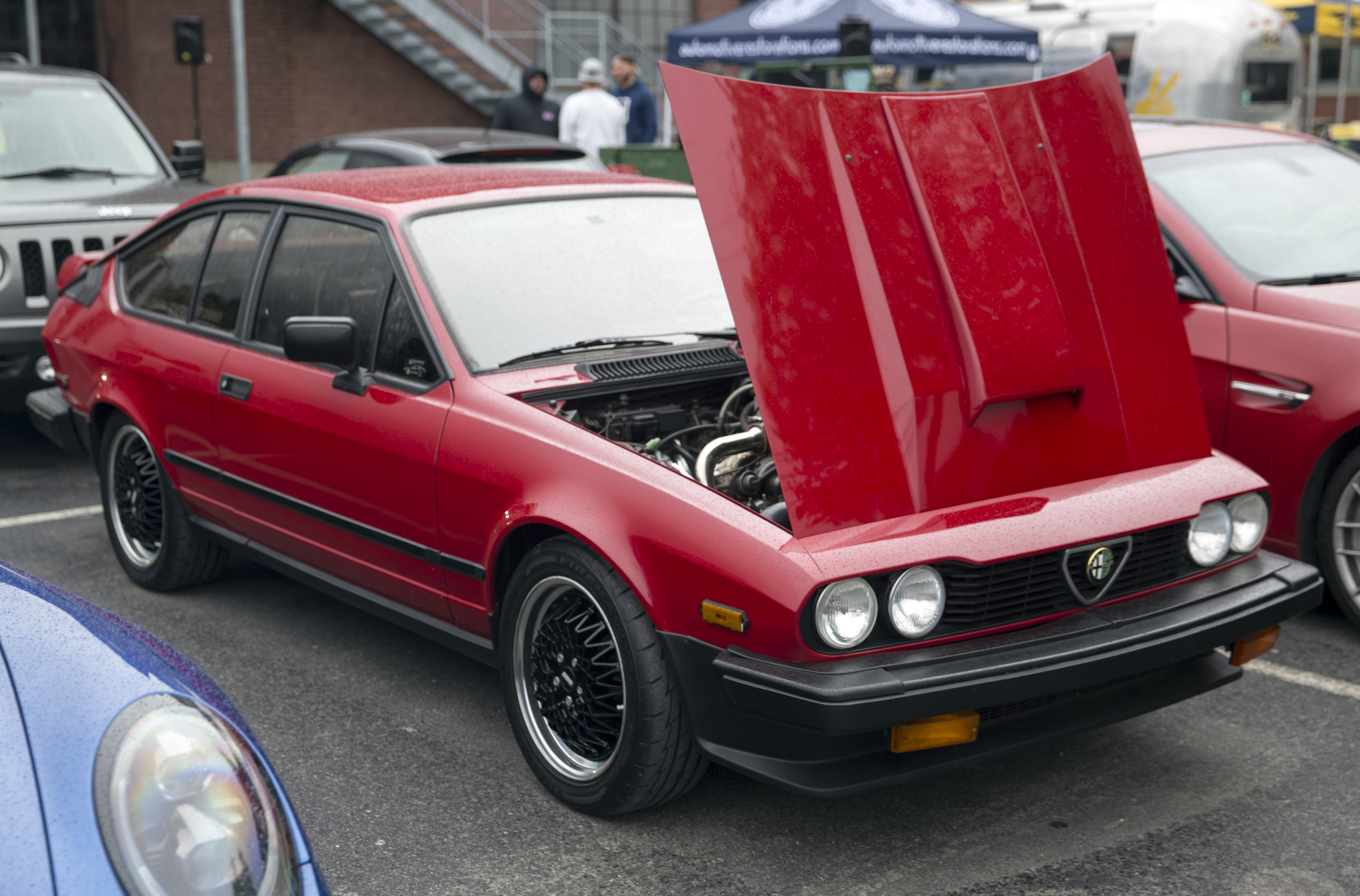
A Callaway Twin Turbo GTV 6, showing the prominent hood scoop

In the US market, the four-cylinder coupé was available from 1975 to 1977 under the moniker Alfetta GT, renamed the Sprint Veloce for the final two years of availability in 1978 and 1979. The Sprint Veloce received an engine upgrade as Alfa Romeo were coming to grips with the American emissions regulations, with power increased marginally to 111 hp (83 kW; 113 PS) at 5,000 rpm from 110 hp (82 kW; 112 PS) at 5,500 rpm. The engine was catalyzed and had a new intake manifold, based on alterations originally developed for California-market cars. It was one of Road & Track's 10 Best Cars For a Changed World. Finally, the V6 version was marketed from 1981 to 1986 as the GTV-6.

For the US market, two limited production GTV-6 models stand out. The GTV6 Balocco (named after the famous Alfa Romeo's Balocco test track in Italy) introduced in 1982 with a production run of only 350 cars. The Balocco was available only in red colour with a sunroof and black interior, leather-wrapped steering wheel and red piping on the seats. There were also two green Quadrifoglio badges fixed on the rear quarter trim pieces above a badge with the "Balocco SE" designation. It was similar to the European-market "Grand Prix" special edition. A plaque inset in the glove box door designated the number of the car out of the series of 350 (XXX of 350). Later there was the GTV 6 2.5 Maratona, of which only 150 were built. The Maratona model included a more aggressive aerodynamic trim package, lightweight Speedline wheels, clear engine view port, sunroof, wood steering wheel and shift knob, rear louvers and Carello fog lamps. All 150 cars were available only painted silver and with a black leather interior; and came with "Maratona" badging on the rear decklid, front fenders and glove box door. (The most notable feature of the Maratona, its aerodynamic kit, was also available as a dealer-installed option on other GTV-6 models.)

Callaway Cars, famous for their later Camaro, Impala SS and Corvette offerings, modified between thirty and thirty six (depending on whether one "counts" those cars with Callaway components which were not assembled by Callaway but, instead, had those components fitted by Alfa Romeo dealers) twin-turbocharged GTV-6s between 1983 and 1986. These are called the Callaway C3, as it was the company's third project, of which the first five (the cars produced between 1983 and 1985; these were sold and titled as 1985 model year cars, save for the first prototype which was sold and titled as a 1984) were prototypes. Callaway "production models" were otherwise listed as from the 1986 model year. In addition to numerous small component upgrades, the Callaway GTV 6's included a somewhat revised suspension (most notably eschewing the metric Michelin TRX wheel/tire combination—then standard on the GTV-6, in favor of Pirelli or Goodyear tires on conventionally sized BBS, Speedline, or OZ lightweight alloys), improved brakes and, most importantly, a twin-turbocharger system. The engine with these upgrades was rated at 230 hp (172 kW; 233 PS) at 5,500 rpm and 332 N⋅m (245 lb⋅ft) at 2,500 rpm; up by fifty percent. A different twin-turbo GTV was also built briefly for the Australian market.

== GT, GTV and GTV 6 racing versions by Autodelta ==
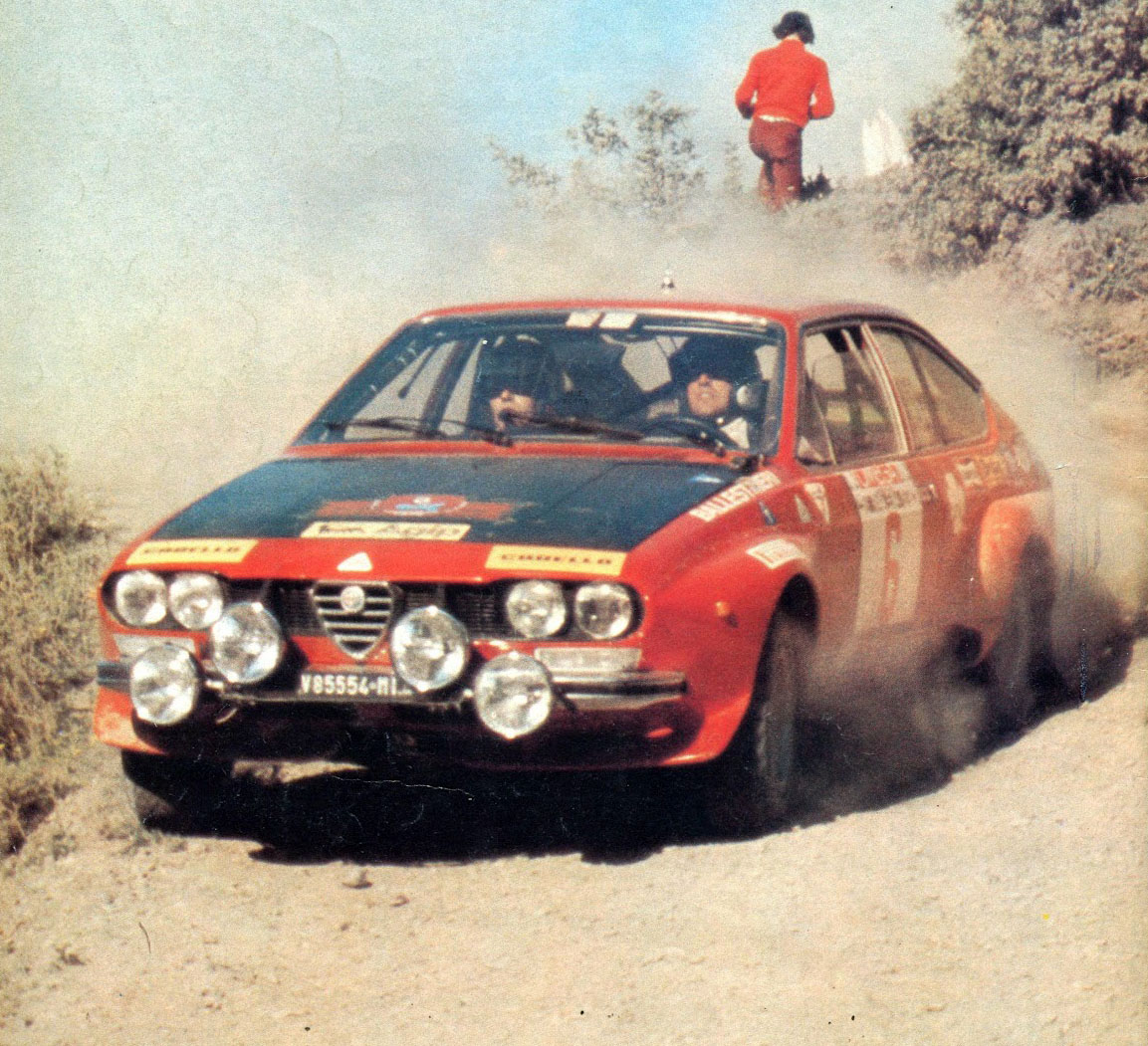
Amilcare Ballestrieri and co-driver Mauro Mannini on an Alfa Romeo Alfetta GT (Group 2) at the 1975 Rallye Sanremo.

Racing versions of the Alfetta GT and GTV were built by Autodelta, initially with the naturally aspirated engines from the earlier GTAm racer based on the 105 series coupé, for homologation under FIA Group 2. There were some variations ranging from the Alfetta GT 1,800 cc engines with twin-plug or even 16-valve heads up to the powerful 2-litre GTAm engine. In this form they were rallied with moderate success in 1975, winning the Elba and Costa Brava rallies overall, as well as winning the Group 2 category in the World Rally Championship's Corsican event.

The next year Autodelta shifted its focus to circuit racing the Alfettas, which won the under 2.5-litre Group 2 division of the European Touring Car Championship, scoring a remarkable second place overall at the 24 Hours Spa, as well as an overall win in the ETC race at Vallelunga, in the 500 Kilometres of Vallelunga. Despite such results, Autodelta's efforts with the Group 2 Alfetta were desultory and ended prematurely, due to Alfa's budgetary constraints and heavy commitments to Formula One and the World Championship for Sports Cars.

At the end of the 1975 season, Autodelta also rallied an Alfetta GTV with a 3.0-litre V8 engine, derived from the 2.6-litre V8 of the Montreal coupé and sharing the same mechanical fuel injection by SPICA. This version was driven by Ballestrieri in the relatively minor Valli Piacentine Rally, but development of the V8 Alfetta as a competition machine was not pursued when the plan to produce 400 roadgoing units of this model for homologation was abandoned. Around twenty 2.6-litre V8-engined Alfetta GTVs were built by Autodelta at the request of the German Alfa importer in 1977, where they were sold for DM50,000, considerably more than the DM20,990 charged for an Alfetta GTV2000.

In 1980 the Alfetta GTV Turbodelta was already homologated in FIA Group 4, since the required number of production engines had been built and fitted to Alfetta Turbodelta Stradale and Nuova Giulietta Turbodelta models. A racing version was campaigned in rallies and developed during 1979 and 1980 seasons: entries backed by Jolly Club were driven by Pregliasco, Ormezzano and Verini. The last development of the Gp.4 Turbodelta featured wide arches, 15x11 Campagnolo rims fitted with massive 290 mm (11 in) tyres, big brakes, light body and huge engine bonnet covering induction to intercooler and turbo system.

Despite scoring a win at the Danube Rally, development of the Gp.4 Alfetta Turbodelta was not pursued as Carlo Chiti, Autodelta chief engineer, had more interest in SportsCars and F1. Other consideration were the introduction of the Giulietta Turbo and the GTV 6 being imminent and the competition department being engaged in preparing to adapt to the 1981/82 change in FIA homologation categories for production-based cars from Group 2 and 4 to Group N and Group A. In the cases of the Group N and A GTV 6, events would prove that Alfa was very well prepared.

In 1986 Alfa Romeo GTV 6 was one of the fastest Group A rally cars. In 1986 production of the GTV 6 ceased and Alfa Romeo turned its Group A racing and rallying efforts to the 75/Milano saloons, which were based on the same rear transaxle chassis. However, 1986 also saw the GTV 6 post one of its finest rallying victories when Yves Loubet's example won the Group A in the 1986 Tour de Corse and placed 3rd overall among the four-wheel-drive Group B cars, while in 1987 Greg Carr, won the Australian rally Championship with the Alfa Romeo Alfetta GTV V6.
