= Alfa Romeo Arese Plant =

Coordinates: 45°33′59″N 9°3′15″E

Alfa Romeo - Centro Tecnico

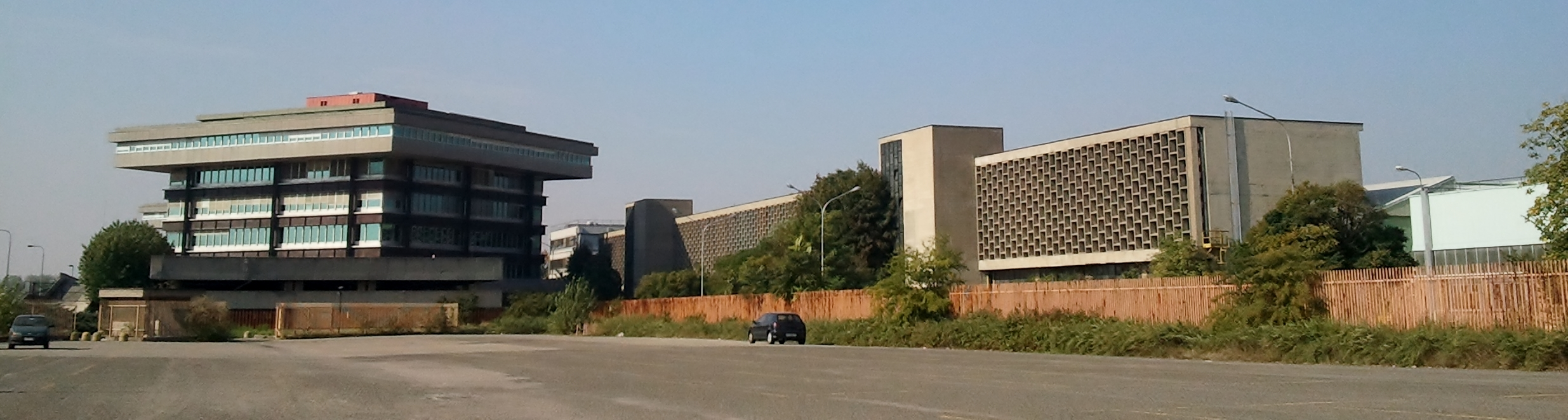
Alfa Romeo facility

The Alfa Romeo Arese Plant was a plant area where Alfa Romeo had its head office for more than two decades prior to 1986. After Fiat Group purchased Alfa Romeo in 1986, Arese became one of the assembly plants of Fiat Group. The factory is in the Province of Milan in the Italian region of Lombardy, located about 12 kilometres (7.5 mi) northwest of Milan. The Arese plant replaced the old Alfa Romeo Portello factory and its construction was started in 1960 and took three years. Until the end of the 1990s it was the biggest plant of Alfa Romeo covering a very wide area, partly in the territories of Lainate and Garbagnate Milanese. The factory became known as the Arese plant only because the main entrance is in the municipality of Arese.

Today the factory is almost totally closed and abandoned, since the Alfa Romeo owners (Fiat S.p.A.) have almost completely moved design and production to other factories inside and outside Italy. The company's final manufacturing activities at Arese ended in 2005 when the Alfa Romeo V6 engine production stopped there.

The few remaining employees (about 500) have often demonstrated against their dismissal. At the moment, most of the factory buildings are abandoned and the local administrations are looking for projects to use the huge area in a proper way, given its location. Arese and the factory are in fact very close to the newest services of Milan, such as the high speed railway and the new exhibition centre FieraMilano. Several Italian highways pass very close to Arese as well: the A8, the A9, the A4, and the west Milan bypass highway which links to A1 and A7. The Centro Stile Alfa Romeo (design department) created in 1990 was one of the last company activities in Arese, but was moved in summer 2009 to Turin. The last designs made in Arese being the MiTo and Giulietta.

In 2016, the Centro shopping center opened, it is considered among the largest retail stores in Europe as it occupies an area of 135,000 square meters and extends over a GLA (Gross leasable area) of 93,000 square meters for which the commercial gallery was defined the greatest of Italy. In addition to the shopping center, as 2019, is active the Customer Services Center of the FCA Group (call center with about 400 employees). In June 2015 has been reopened the Alfa Romeo Historical Museum and was delivered the renovation of the former test runway. In the past this short track was used to test new car built in the factory, now the small automotive circuit is used by customers of the adjacent motor village dealer.

== The Historical Museum ==
One of the few activities which are still located in the Alfa Romeo buildings is the Museo Storico Alfa Romeo, which is hosted in a dedicated building of great architectural value. In February 2011, the museum was "closed for renovations", but eventually reopened in June 2015 after extensive renovations.

== List of cars manufactured ==
Image	Brand	Model	Production start	production stop	Note
	Alfa Romeo	Giulia GT	1963	1976	
	Alfa Romeo	Giulia	1965	1977	
	Alfa Romeo	1750	1968	1971	
	Alfa Romeo	2000	1971	1977	
	Alfa Romeo	Alfetta	1972	1984	
	Alfa Romeo	Alfetta GT	1974	1987	
	Alfa Romeo	Nuova Giulietta	1977	1985	
	Alfa Romeo	Alfa 6	1979	1986	
	Alfa Romeo	90	1984	1987	
	Alfa Romeo	75	1985	1992	
	Alfa Romeo	164	1987	1998	
	Autobianchi	Y10	1992	1995	
	Alfa Romeo	GTV and Spider	1993	2000	in 2000 the production was moved to the Pininfarina plant in San Giorgio Canavese (Turin)
	Fiat	Seicento Elettra (VAMIA)	1998	2000	fitting an electric motor and batteries of cars coming from the Fiat plant in Tychy (Poland)
	Fiat	Multipla Metano (VAMIA)	2000	2002	Install gas systems on vehicles coming from the Fiat plant in Mirafiori (Turin)
