= Alfa Romeo Alfa 6 =

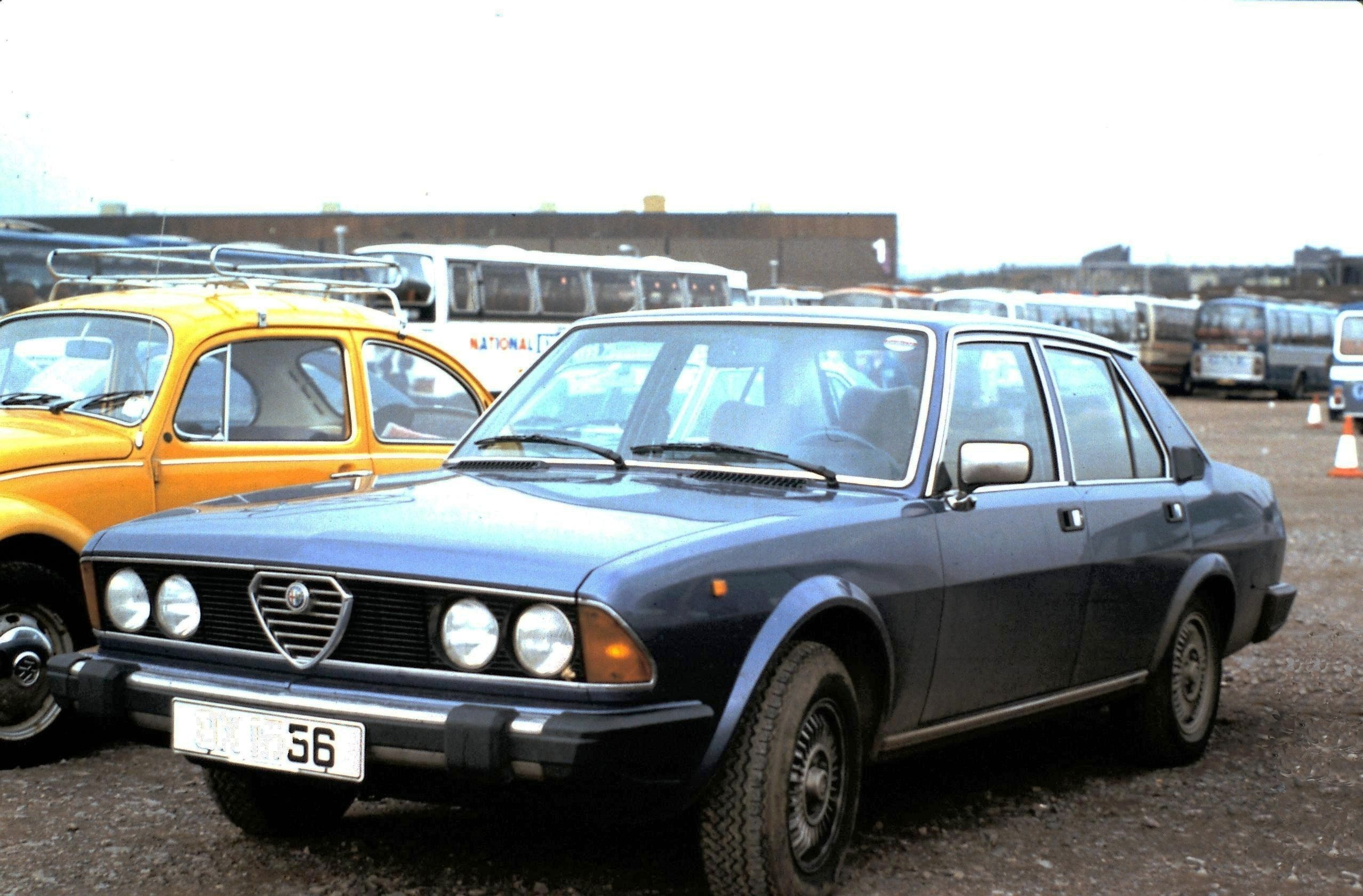
- Alfa Romeo Alfa 6 first series

Overview
- Manufacturer: Alfa Romeo
- Also called: Alfa Sei
- Production: 1979–1986
- Assembly: Italy: Arese (MI) Plant, Lombardy

Body and chassis
- Class: Executive car (E)
- Body style: 4-door saloon
- Layout: Front-engine, rear-wheel-drive
- Related: Alfa Romeo Alfetta; Alfa Romeo Delfino

Powertrain
- Engine: Petrol: 2.0 L Alfa Romeo V6; 2.5 L Alfa Romeo V6; Diesel: 2.5 L VM HR588 Turbo-diesel I5
- Transmission: 5-speed manual; 3-speed ZF automatic

Dimensions
- Wheelbase: 2,600 mm (102.4 in)
- Length: 4,760 mm (187.4 in)
- Width: 1,680 mm (66.1 in)
- Height: 1,420 mm (55.9 in)
- Kerb weight: 1,480 kg (3,263 lb) (petrol); 1,580 kg (3,480 lb) (turbodiesel)

Chronology
- Predecessor: Alfa Romeo 2600
- Successor: Alfa Romeo 164

The Alfa Romeo Alfa 6 (Type 119) is an executive car produced by the Italian automaker Alfa Romeo from 1979 to 1986. Its name refers to the six cylinders of the Alfa Romeo V6 engine, which made its first appearance on this car.

== History ==
On its launch in 1979, the Alfa 6 was the flagship of the Alfa Romeo range. The four-door body was fairly conventional and used a similar style to the existing Alfa Romeo Alfetta, and in fact both vehicles share a great number of parts, including door panels; Design work on the 6 was done prior to the Alfetta, but the fuel crisis of 1973 delayed further development and led to the 6's belated 1979 debut. The styling was not particularly aerodynamic but the drag coefficient was an acceptable 0.41. Power came from an all-new 2.5-litre V6 engine which generated 158 PS (116 kW; 156 hp) at 5,600 rpm using a total of six carburettors and a single, belt driven camshaft in each cylinder head. Power steering, power windows, central locking, electric wing mirrors and a 25% limited-slip differential were standard, making the Alfa 6 competitively priced compared to similar saloons of that time where such equipment typically was a costly extra. The car was also designed to set new standards in safety; for example it featured a shock sensor in the boot which would cut off the fuel supply in the event of a crash.

=== Facelift ===
In 1983, the car was revamped, with single rectangle headlights replacing the twin round units, new bumpers, a new grille and new trim around the rear lights. Minor interior changes were also carried out, whilst mechanically the engine's troublesome six carburettors were replaced by Bosch L-Jetronic fuel injection, with the power remaining at 158 PS (116 kW; 156 hp). This revamp also saw the introduction of two new engines, a 2.0-litre version of the existing V6 engine (which retained the carburettors and was specific for the Italian market, where engines larger than two liters were heavily taxed) and a 2.5 litre VM 5 cylinder turbodiesel.

The Bertone Delfino concept car in 1983 was based on an Alfa 6.

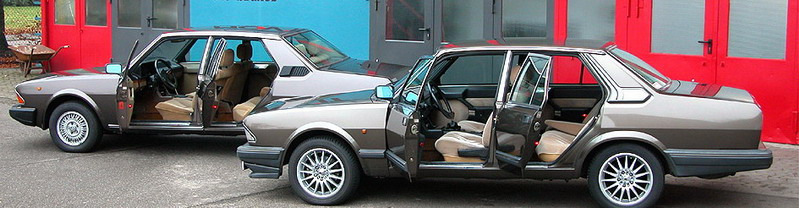
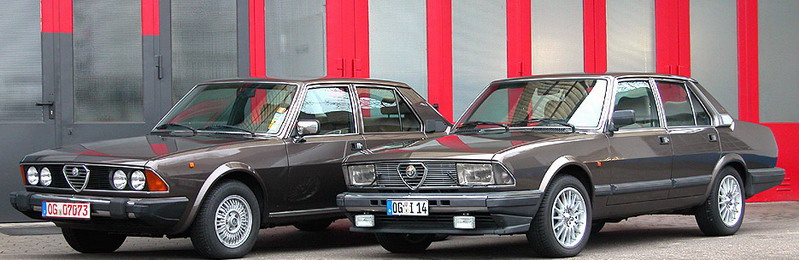
Alfa Romeo Alfa 6 first series (left) and second series

== Specifications ==
The engine and gearbox were situated at the front and a limited-slip differential at the rear. The Alfa 6 was fitted with four disc brakes, with the rear ones inboard, to reduce unsprung weight. The 6 has De Dion tube at the rear and it has independent front corners, the gearbox was also located in the front. Two different 5-speed gearboxes were available: one with a "normal" layout, the other with "dog-leg" layout. A three speed automatic transmission from ZF was also available as an option and the ZF hydraulic power steering was the first to be fitted to an Alfa Romeo.

=== Engines and production ===
Model	Engine	Displacement	Power	Torque	Years	No. made
Petrol engines
Alfa 6 2.0 V6	V6	1,997 cc (6 single Dell'Orto carburetors)	99 kW (135 PS) at 5,600 rpm	178 N⋅m (131 lb⋅ft) at 4,500 rpm	1983–1986	1,771
Alfa 6 2.5	V6	2,492 cc (6 single Dell'Orto carburetors)	118 kW (158 PS) at 5,800 rpm	219 N⋅m (162 lb⋅ft) at 4,000 rpm	1979–1982	5,748
Alfa 6 2.5 V6 QO	V6	2,492 cc (Bosch L-Jetronic)	116 kW (158 PS) at 5,600 rpm	215 N⋅m (159 lb⋅ft) at 4,000 rpm	1983–1986	1,574
Diesel engine
Alfa 6 2.5 TD	I5	2,494 cc VM turbodiesel	77 kW (105 PS) at 4,300 rpm	206 N⋅m (152 lb⋅ft) at 2,400 rpm	1983–1986	2,977
Total production						12,070
