= Alfa Romeo 164 =

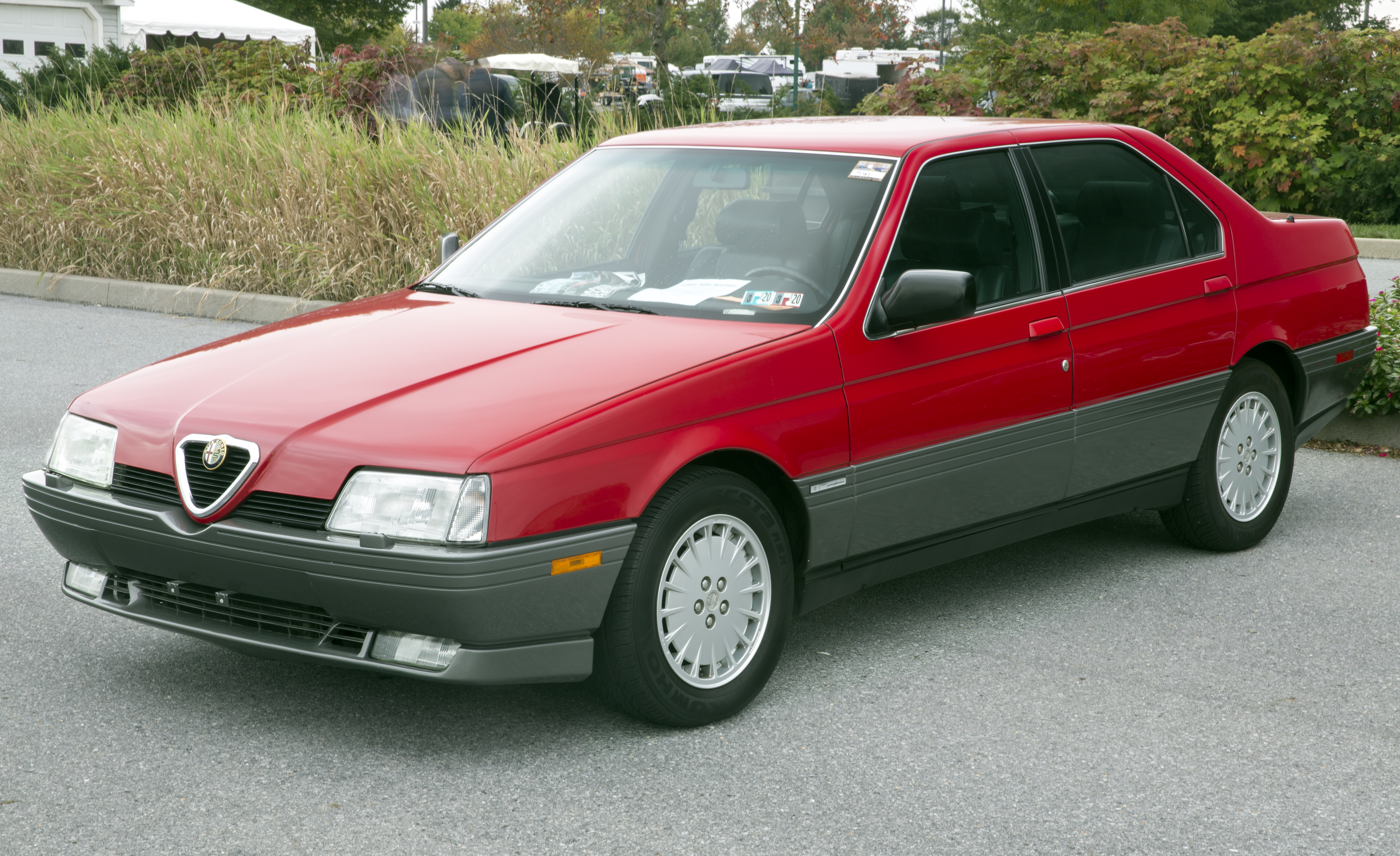

Overview
- Manufacturer: Alfa Lancia Industriale (1987–1991); Fiat Auto (1991–1998)
- Also called: Alfa Romeo 168 (Taiwan, Hong Kong, and Malaysia)
- Production: 1987–1998
- Assembly: Italy: Arese Plant, Lombardy
- Designer: Enrico Fumia at Pininfarina

Body and chassis
- Class: Executive car (E)
- Body style: 4-door saloon
- Layout: Front-engine, front-wheel-drive / four-wheel-drive
- Platform: Type Four
- Related: Fiat Croma (Tipo 154); Lancia Thema; Saab 9000; Alfa Romeo Proteo; Alfa Romeo Scighera

Powertrain
- Engine: Petrol: 2.0 L Twin Spark 8V I4; 2.0 L Fiat 834C.146 8V turbo I4; 2.0 L Alfa Romeo 12V turbo V6; 3.0 L Alfa Romeo 12V V6; 3.0 L Alfa Romeo 24V V6; Diesel: 2.5 L VM 425 Turbo-diesel OHV I4
- Transmission: 5-speed manual; 6-speed Getrag manual; 4-speed ZF 4HP18Q automatic; 4-speed ZF 4HP18QE automatic

Dimensions
- Wheelbase: 2,660 mm (104.7 in)
- Length: 4,554 mm (179.3 in) (1988–1990); 4,557 mm (179.4 in) (1991–1992); 4,560 mm (179.5 in) (1993–1994); 4,665 mm (183.7 in) (Super)
- Width: 1,760 mm (69.3 in)
- Height: 1,390 mm (54.7 in) (1988–1990); 1,393 mm (54.8 in) (1991–1992); 1,390 mm (54.7 in) (1993–1995)
- Kerb weight: 1,200–1,510 kg (2,650–3,330 lb)

Chronology
- Predecessor: Alfa Romeo 90; Alfa Romeo Alfa 6; Alfa Romeo 2300
- Successor: Alfa Romeo 166

The Alfa Romeo 164 (Type 164) is a four-door executive saloon manufactured and marketed by Italian automaker Alfa Romeo from 1987 to 1998, styled by Pininfarina, and cooperatively designed and sharing platforms and numerous elements with the Fiat Croma, Saab 9000 and Lancia Thema.

The 164 succeeded the Alfa Romeo 90 and Alfa 6. The 164 was followed by the 166 in 1998, after a combined production total of 273,857 units.

The 164 was also the last Alfa Romeo officially sold in the United States until the 2015 launch of the Alfa Romeo Giulia. Alfa Romeo withdrew after the 1995 model year due to reliability concerns and slow sales.

== Development ==
The 164 started life as Project 156 (not to be confused with Alfa Romeo 156) in 1980 as a proposal by Alfa Romeo engineer Filippo Surace as a modular platform for a range of cars aimed to replace the Alfa Sud and Alfetta. Project 156 was meant to be a rear-wheel drive and powered by the Alfa Romeo's Busso V6. A saloon body was designed by Centro Stile Alfa Romeo's designer Ermanno Cressoni featuring a modern design language according to its times and a tail higher than the Alfetta. A year later, when the tooling and drivetrain development was underway, the Italian Government, which owned Alfa Romeo at the time, cut back the funding which resulted in the shelving of the project. Surace then engaged in talks with Lancia engineer Sergio Camuffo to discuss a joint venture in order to save development costs for a new model range. This joint development brought Alfa Romeo into the Fiat Tipo Quattro platform which was itself originally a joint development between Fiat and Saab tracing its roots to October 1978.

Surace nonetheless utilized the existing tooling developed in house for Project 156 by modifying it to accommodate the front-wheel drive layout of the new platform while Cressoni's team refined the design further to suit the new platform's changed architecture. However, this time they had direct competition from renowned styling house Pininfarina. It was however, the latter's design proposal styled by Enrico Fumia which gained the management's approval in 1984 and was approved for production. However, early development mules of the car, now known as 164, utilized body panels made from the now cancelled Project 156 confusing spy photographers and journalists. Some design elements from Project 156 made their way to the Alfa Romeo 75.

The 164 featured a wedge shape yielding it a drag coefficient of Cd=0.30. The design would later influence the rest of the Alfa Romeo range (starting in 1990 with the major redesign of the 33 and culminating with the 155.

Ultimately unveiled at the 1987 Frankfurt Motor Show, the 164 was the last model to be developed while the Alfa Romeo was still a fully independent company, and was formally launched a few months after the takeover by Fiat.

== Design ==
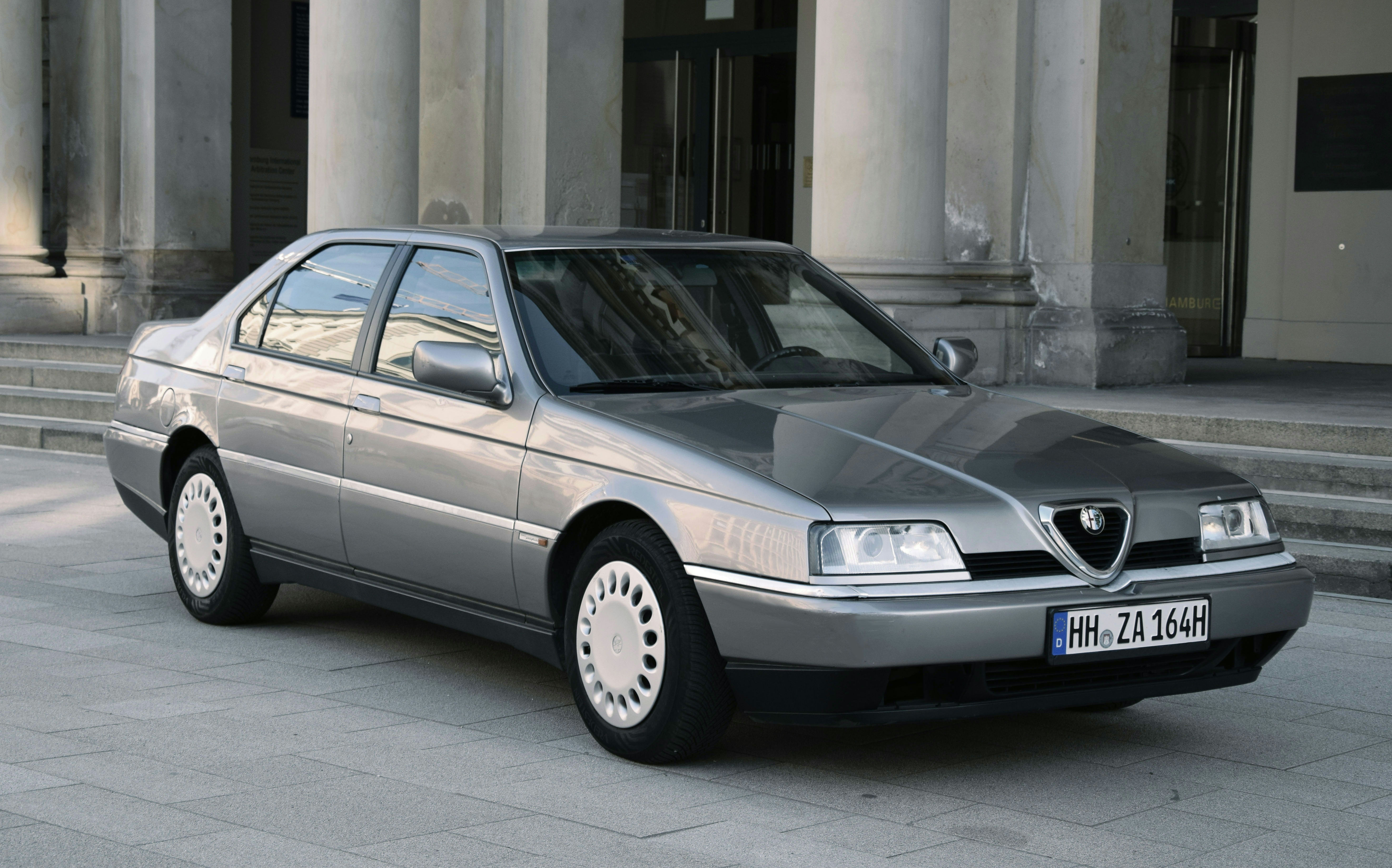
Alfa Romeo 164 (second series, European version)

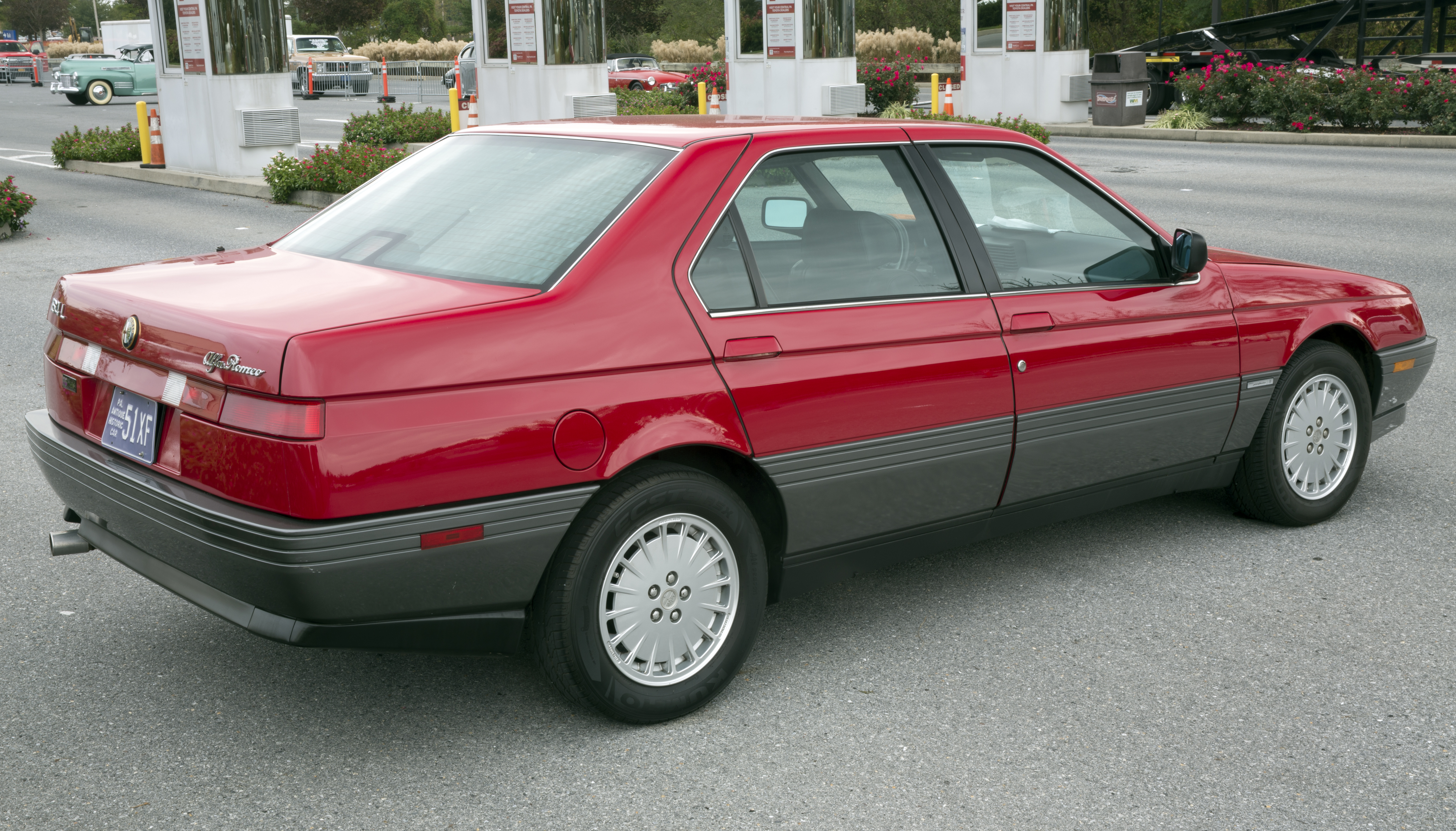
Alfa Romeo 164 (first series, US version)

The 164 was styled by Enrico Fumia of Pininfarina, with the first 1:1 scale model produced in 1982. Design cues were publicly revealed on the Alfa Romeo Vivace concept car, which was exhibited at the 1986 Turin Motorshow that went on to influence the design of the Alfa Romeo GTV and Spider (916 series) presented in 1994.

The 164 became the first Alfa Romeo to benefit from extensive use of computer aided design, used to calculate structural stresses that resulted in a very rigid but still relatively lightweight chassis. Although sharing the same platform as that of the Lancia Thema, Fiat Croma and Saab 9000, by virtue of the fact that it was the last of the four to enter production, it featured unique front suspension geometry and the most distinctive styling of the lot. In fact, for example, the other cars all shared identical side door panels. Though still voluminous, the 164 had the tightest aperture to the rear boot, which had a 510-Litre capacity.

Overall, the 164 also benefitted from improved build quality relative to previous Alfa Romeos, due to the extensive use of galvanised steel for the chassis and various body panels for the first time in the brand's history. Moreover, the car featured advanced (but troublesome) electronics due in part to the most complex wiring harness fitted to any Alfa Romeo. For example: it had three onboard computers (one for air conditioning, one for instrumentation, and one for the engine management); air conditioning and instrument functions shared a multiple-mode coded Zilog Z80-class microcontroller for dashboard functioning). The instrumentation included a full range of gauges including an advanced check-panel.

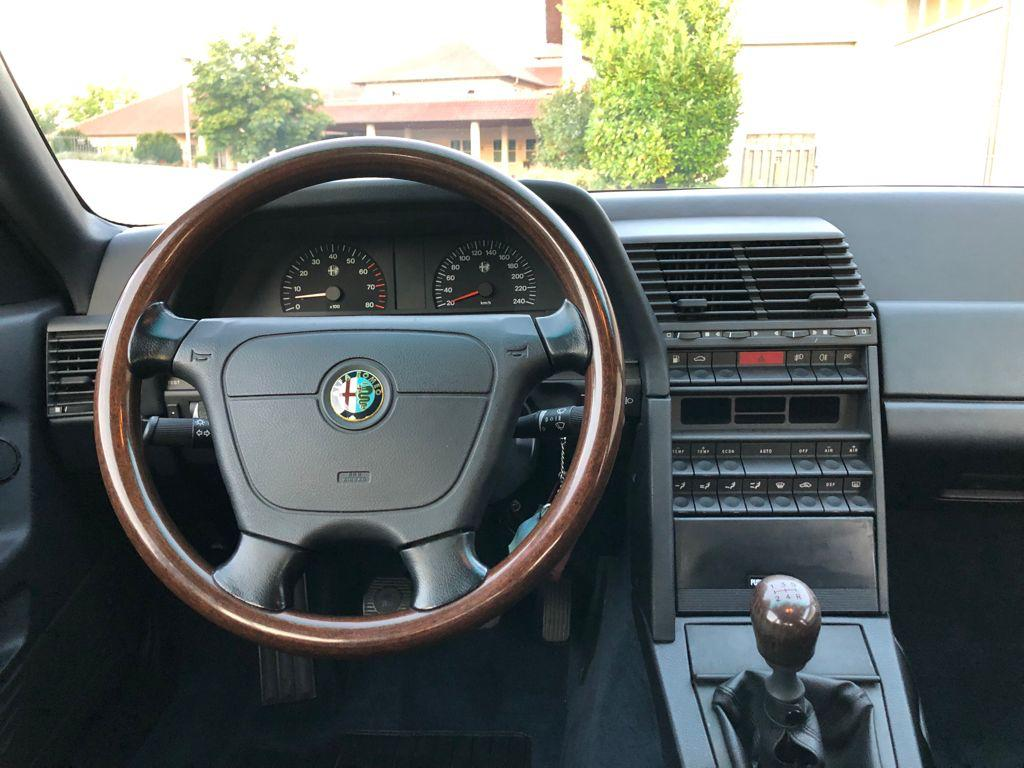
Interior

The interior was spacious and modern, available with standard velour seating or a leather trim depending on the model. The dashboard continued the avantgarde design of the exterior with a centre console that was dominated by a large number of seemingly identical buttons arranged in rows. Air-direction within the ventilation system was controlled by a pair of servomechanisms, which used fragile plastic gears.

Depending on the model, the 164 featured automatic climate control and electronically controlled damping suspension - the latter, for example, in the sports-oriented Quadrifoglio Verde ("Green Cloverleaf ") and 164S models. This suspension actively reduced damping in response to conditions to provide a dynamic compromise between road holding and comfort.

== Range ==
The 164 was only offered as a four-door saloon, unlike the related Type Four cars that were available in other bodystyles (i.e. Croma and 9000 hatchback; 9000 and Thema sedans; Thema wagon). In addition, until 1993, the 164 was only available in front wheel drive like the related cars.

The original 164 range launched in 1987 comprised the following models:

- 2.0i Twin Spark (badged "T.SPARK")
- 2.0 Turbo (four-cylinder, Italian market only)
- 3.0i V6 12-valve
- 2.5 Turbodiesel (badged "TD").
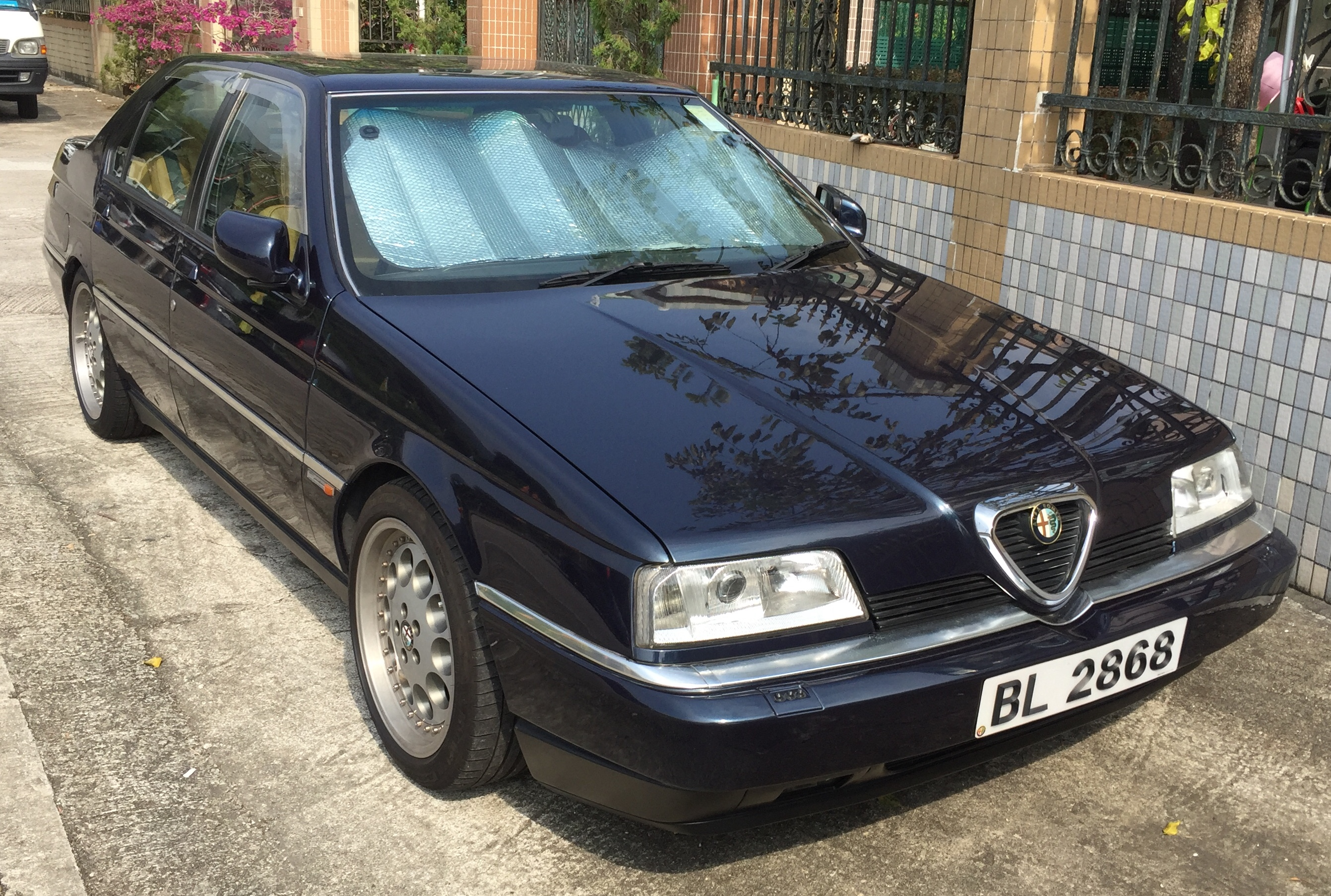

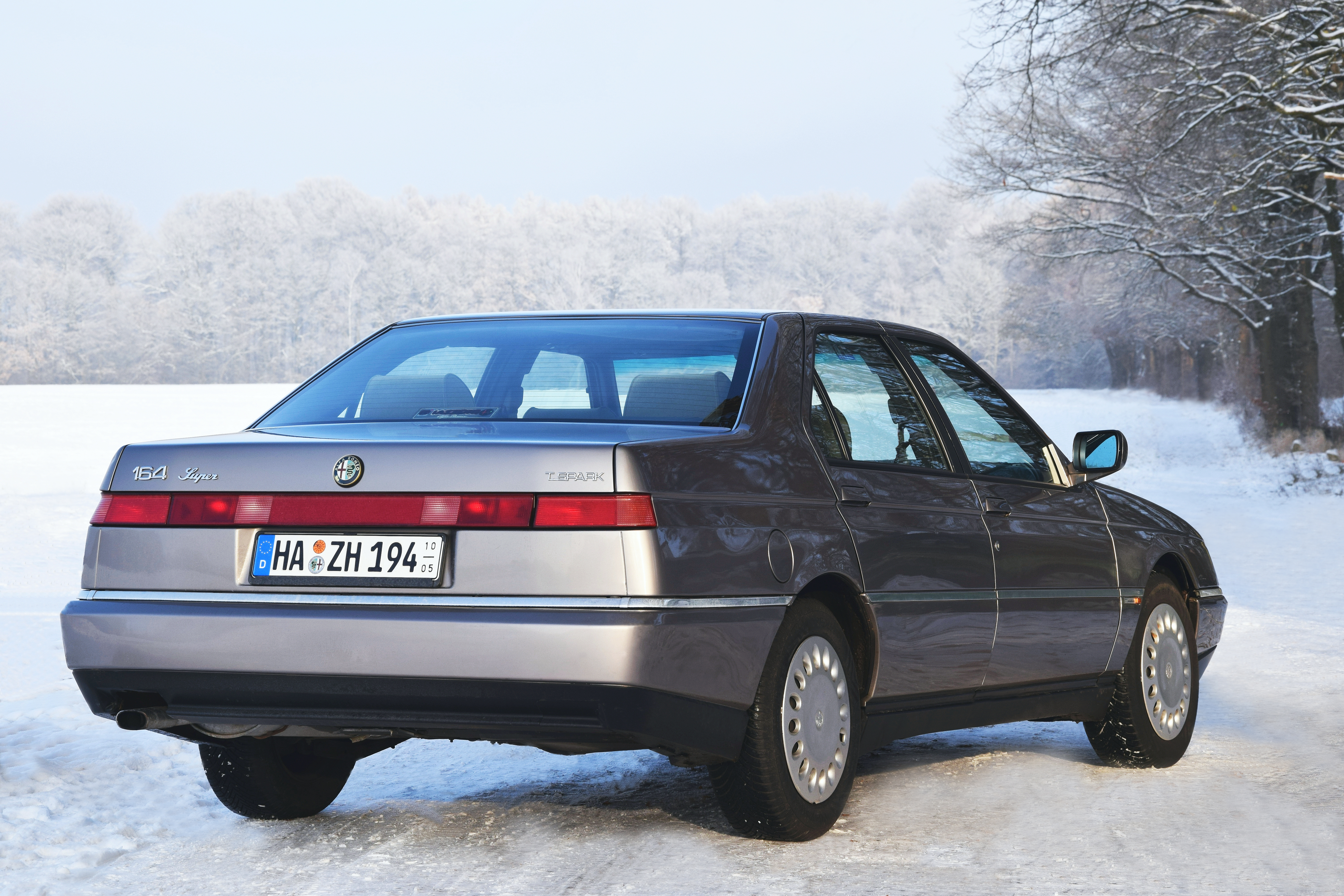
Alfa Romeo 164 (second series)

European export versions were fitted with catalytic converters to meet more stringent emission standards, including the Twin Spark Europa model.

In 1990, the range was expanded by the sports-oriented 3.0i V6 Quadrifoglio Verde (badged "QV" or "S"). In early 1991, the turbocharged four-cylinder "tax special" version was replaced by a turbocharged, 2-litre V6 with more power. North American export versions were new for the 1991 model year; this range included the luxury-oriented 164 L ("L" for Lusso in Italian) equipped with the 3.0-litre V6 rated at 183 hp (136 kW) and 185 lb⋅ft (251 N⋅m) of torque and the 164 S (in essence, the "QV") with an uprated 200 hp (149 kW) and 189 lb⋅ft (256 N⋅m).

Apart from minor running production upgrades, the range was revamped and became known as the 164 Super in 1993. Key differences on the outside consisted of chrome trimmings added to the upper edge of the bumpers bars and revised headlights now with a slimmer profile. Inside, there were revised instruments and a centre console that featured more delineated switchgear.

The range was now also bolstered by the following models:

- 3.0i V6 24V with a 24-valve engine upgrade
- 3.0i V6 Quadrifoglio 4 (badged "Q4"), which was the most powerful and sole all wheel drive variant built.

In the North American market, the new 24-valve version of the 3.0L V6 was rated at 210 hp (157 kW) and 198 lb⋅ft (268 N⋅m) of torque in LS trim while the S model developed 230 hp (172 kW) and 202 lb⋅ft (274 N⋅m). The 3.0-litre V6 was the only engine ever offered there, and 1995 would prove to be the last year an Alfa Romeo sedan would be sold there until the 2017 model year.

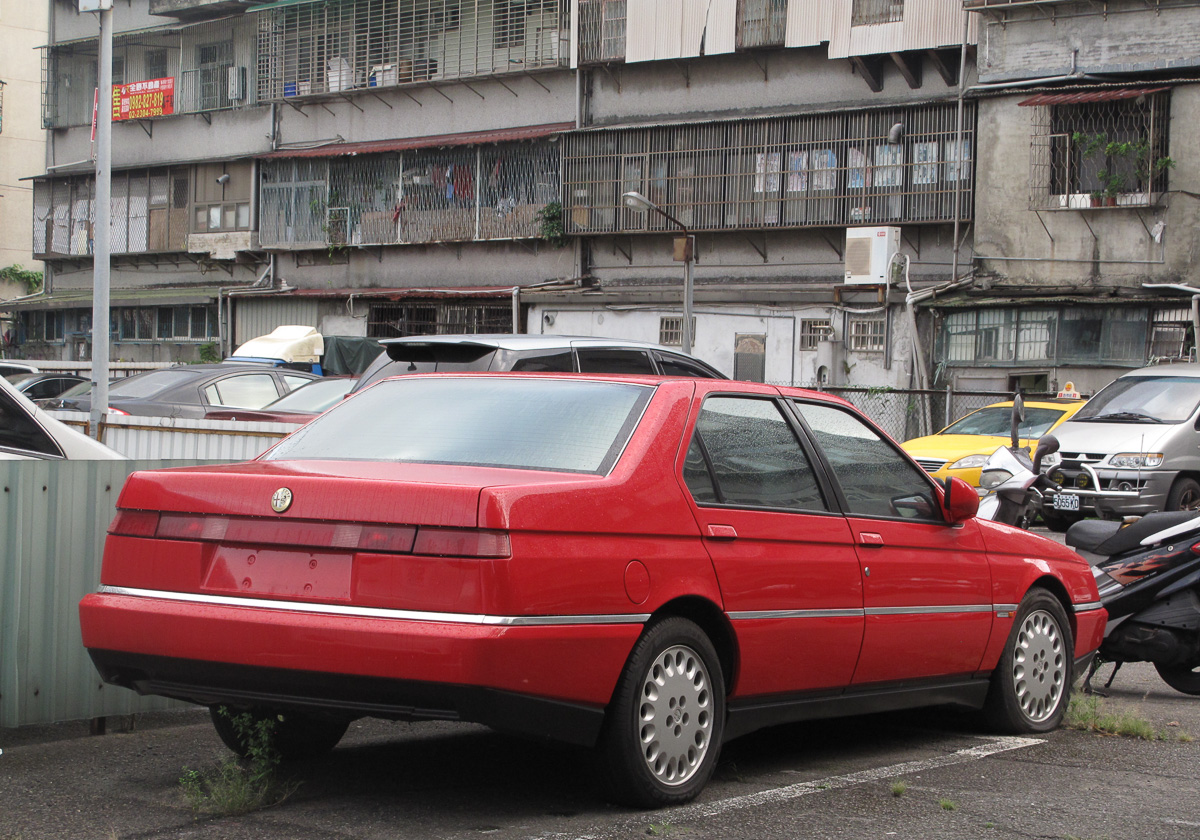
Alfa Romeo 168 (Taiwan)

The 164 was rebadged as the 168 for the Taiwan, Hong Kong, and Malaysian markets, as the number "164" had a very negative connotation (一路死 — a Chinese homophone meaning "all the way to death"), and "168" has quite the opposite meaning (一路發 — "all the way to prosperity").

=== Quadrifoglio Verde ===
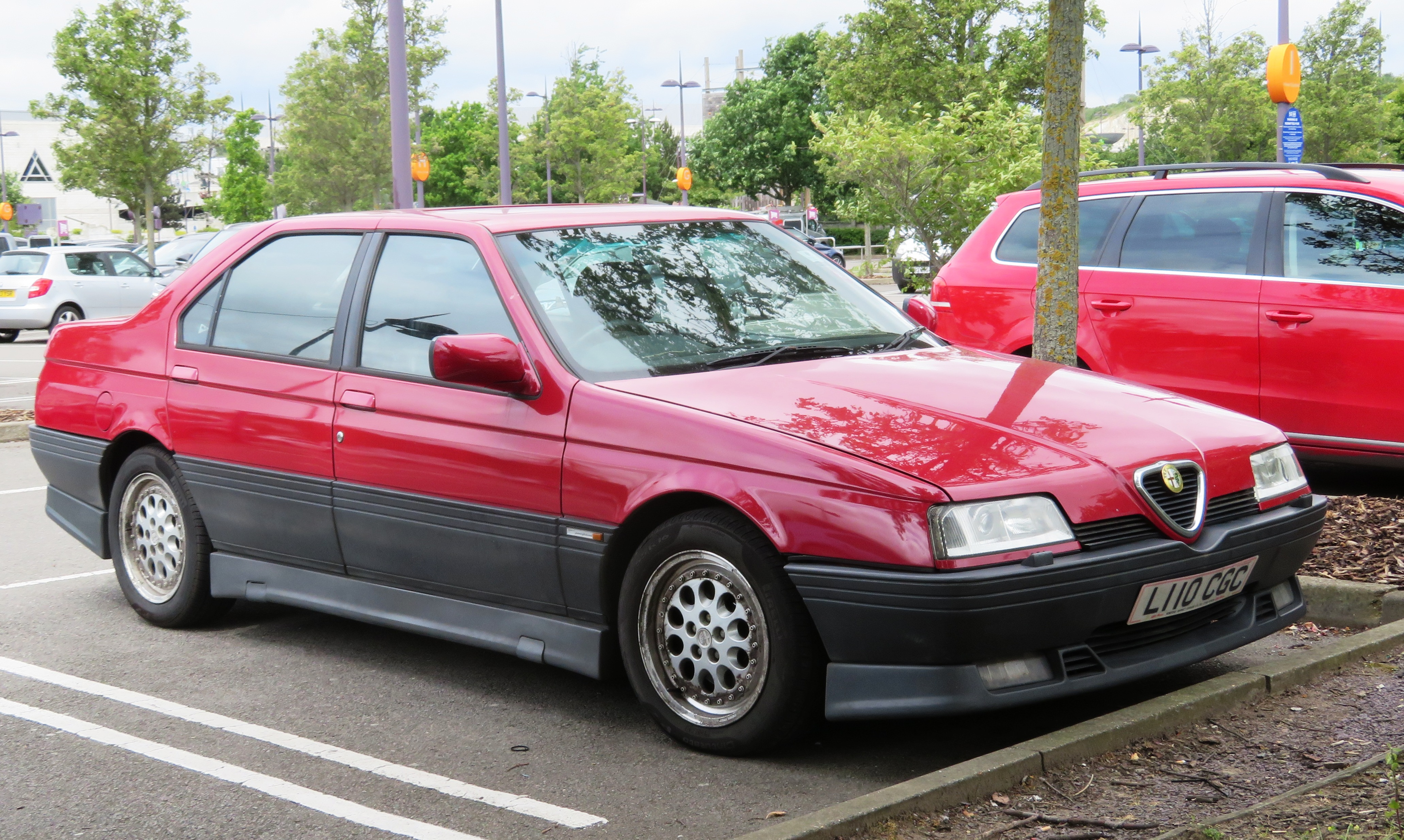
Alfa Romeo 164 QV

The 164 QV or Quadrifoglio Verde was available from 1990 to 1992 as the top of the range model. It was fitted with a bodykit that comprised an extended front spoiler, deeper side-skirts and a deeper rear apron. Inside, the QV featured sculpted sports seats whereas, mechanically, it was fitted with an up-rated version of the 3.0-litre V6 12-valve engine and adjustable damper settings. The engine sat 3 cm (1.2 in) lower, while the suspension was dropped by 2 cm (0.8 in). The added power, up from 184 to 200 hp (135 to 147 kW), was the result of sharper cams, an increased compression ratio, and polished inlets and exhaust. In some markets, like Australia, this was the only 164 available with a manual transmission. From 1992, this model was powered by the new 24-valve V6 engine.

=== Q4 ===
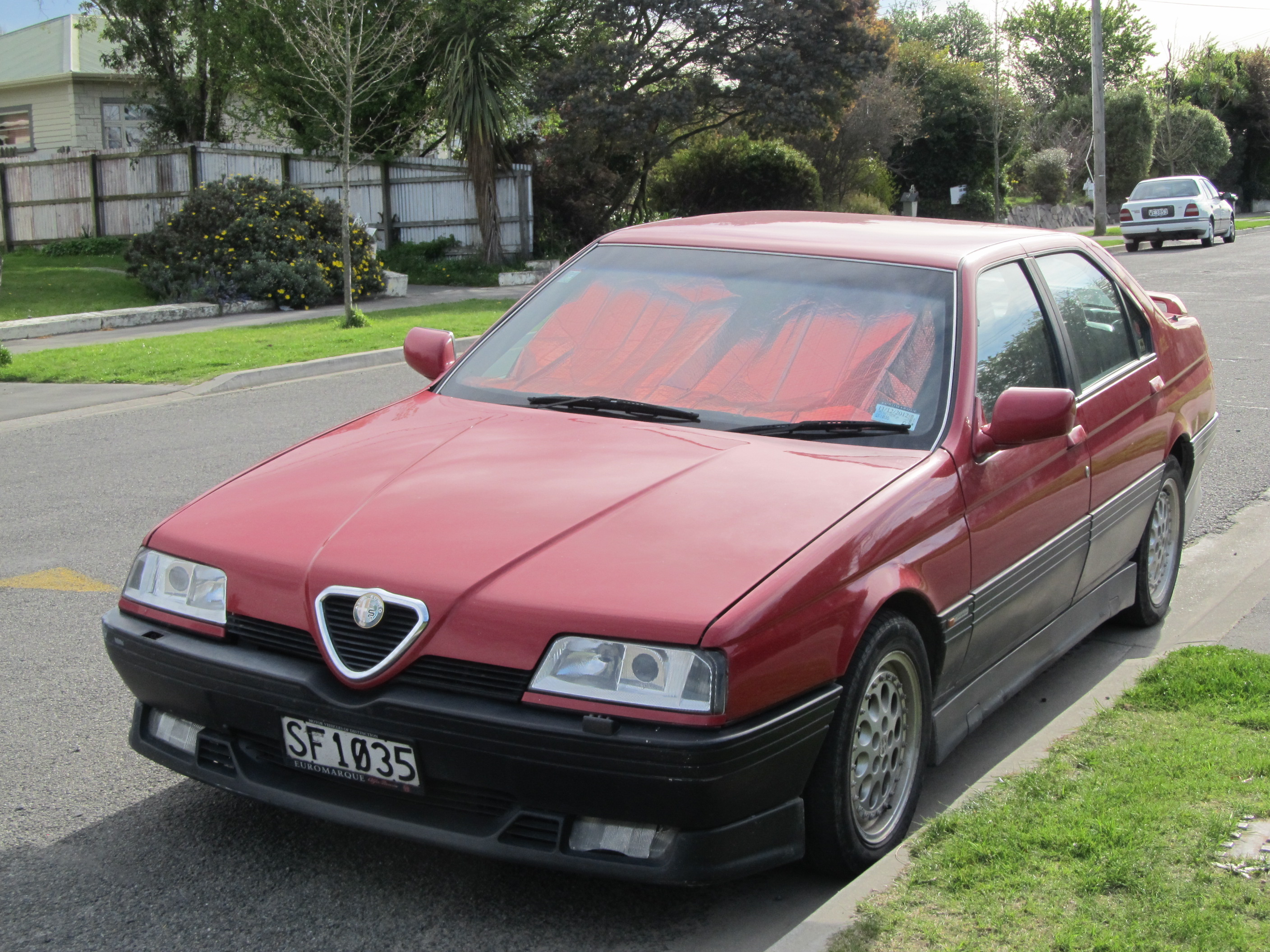
Alfa Romeo 164 Q4

In 1993, Alfa Romeo introduced a four-wheel drive variant called the Q4 (short for Quadrifoglio 4), which was equipped with the most powerful 3.0-Litre V6 engine fitted to the 164, featuring 24-valves. The Q4's four-wheel-drive system ("Viscomatic") was co-developed with the Austrian company Steyr-Daimler-Puch. and was more advanced than other systems offered at the time. The system consisted of a viscous coupling unit, central epicyclic differential and Torsen differential in the rear. Connected to the ABS and "Motronic" engine management modules, the power driven to the rear axle was continuously variable from 0 to 100% subject to road conditions. Torque was distributed between axles depending on the speed, turning radius, engine rpm, throttle position and ABS parametrics. This model was equipped with a Getrag 6-speed manual gearbox.

== Engines ==
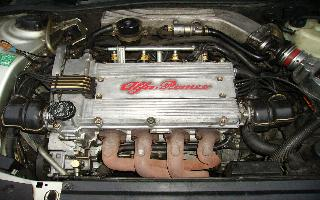
Alfa Romeo Twin Spark 8-valve 4-cylinder engine

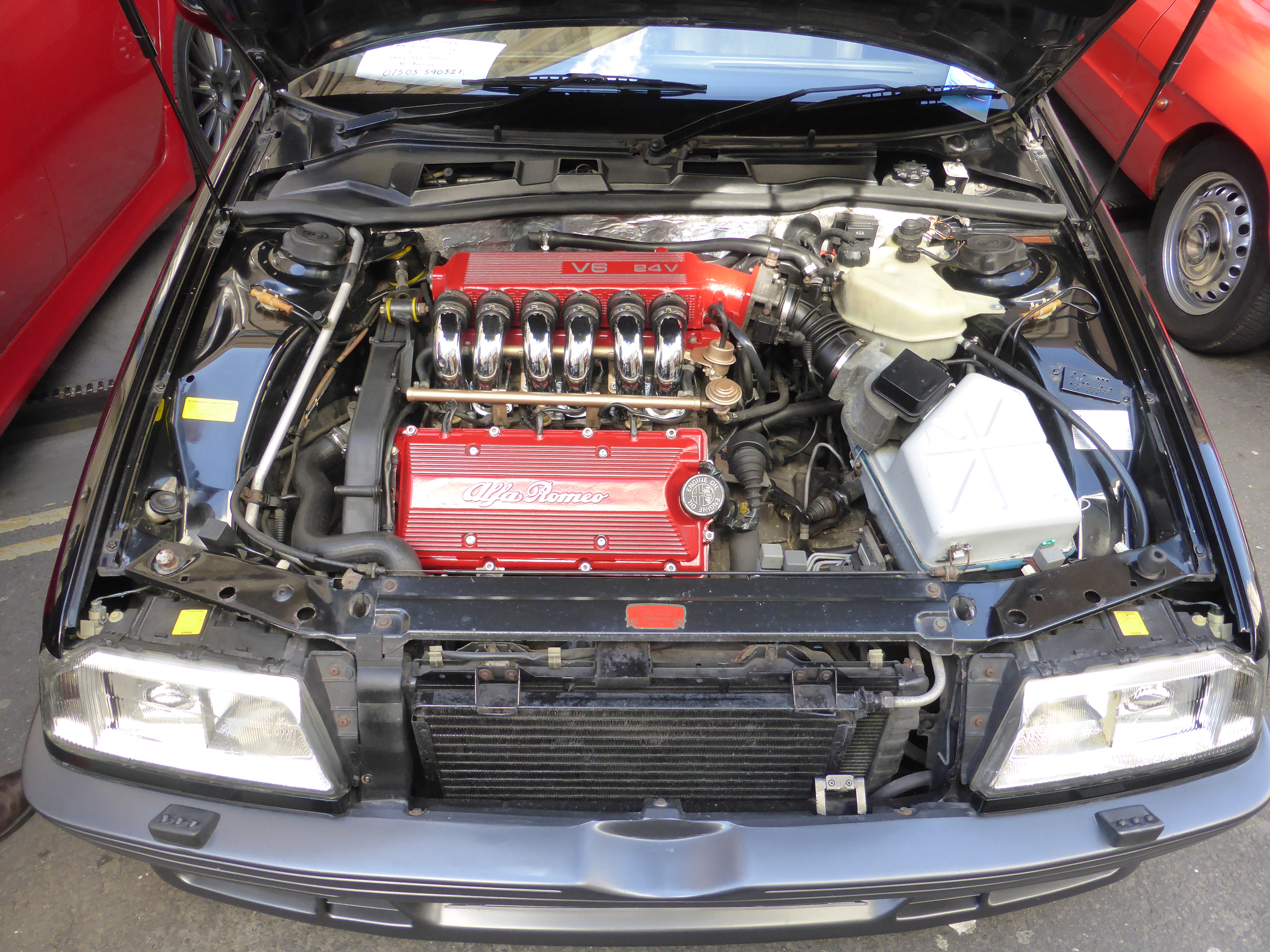
Alfa Romeo DOHC 24-valve V6 engine in a 164 QV

The base 164 engine was the 2.0 L Twin Spark inline-four engine with two spark plugs per cylinder. Apart from that, this engine was also notable for having a two-stage valve timing system (before Honda's VTEC), and an induction valve blade-type system, both aimed at improving low-end torque.

The block of the Twin Spark was the same 2.0 L that had been a part of Alfa's road and race car history since the 1930s. The engine featured fuel injection, controlled by a Bosch Motronic system as well as a chain-driven DOHC cylinder head, a single cooling fan and generator belt, improved reliability and reduced parasitic friction. The battery of all 164s was placed in the trunk to achieve a near 50:50 weight distribution.

Next was a turbocharged 2.0 L eight-valve engine, derived from the Lancia Thema i.e. Turbo including an overboost feature. This was later replaced by a turbocharged 2.0 L V6, which was based on the 3.0 L engine and was fitted with a very sophisticated engine management system from Bosch.

The top-of-the-line engine was the 3.0 L "Busso" V6 designed by Giuseppe Busso originally for the Alfa 6. Its 12-valve design was later upgraded to 24-valves for the new V6 models and, specifically, the QV and Q4.

For Europe, there was also a turbodiesel version with an engine sourced from the Italian engine maker VM Motori. Rated at 92 kW (125 PS; 123 hp), with this engine, the 164 had a top speed of 200 km/h (124 mph).

A 2.0 L V6 turbocharged engine was intended for the domestic market, due to an Italian law at the time under which cars with engine displacement over 2000 cc had a value-added tax of 38% instead of the usual 18%.

=== Performance ===
Model	Type	Displ.	Power	Torque	0–100 km/h (0–62 mph)	Top speed	Years
Petrol engines
2.0 8V I4 TS	I4	2.0 L (1,962 cc)	109 kW (148 PS; 146 hp)	187 N⋅m (138 lbf⋅ft) at 4700 rpm	9.2 s	215 km/h (134 mph)	1987–1989
2.0 8V I4 TS (cat)	I4	2.0 L (1,962 cc)	106 kW (144 PS; 142 hp)	187 N⋅m (138 lbf⋅ft) at 4700 rpm	9.9 s	210 km/h (130 mph)	1990–1992
2.0 8V I4 TS	I4	2.0 L (1,962 cc)	107 kW (146 PS; 144 hp)	193 N⋅m (142 lbf⋅ft) at 5000 rpm	9.9 s	215 km/h (134 mph)	1992–1994
2.0 8V I4 TS Super	I4	2.0 L (1,995 cc)	107 kW (146 PS; 144 hp)	187 N⋅m (138 lbf⋅ft) at 5000 rpm	9.9 s	215 km/h (134 mph)	1995–1997
2.0 8V I4 Turbo	I4	2.0 L (1,995 cc)	129 kW (175 PS; 173 hp) (Note: Plus overboost.)	265 N⋅m (195 lbf⋅ft) at 2500 rpm	7.2 s	225 km/h (140 mph)	1987–1991
2.0 12V V6 Turbo	V6	2.0 L (1,996 cc)	154 kW (210 PS; 207 hp)	306 N⋅m (226 lbf⋅ft) at 2750 rpm	7.2 s	243 km/h (151 mph)	1991–1992
2.0 12V V6 Turbo Super	V6	2.0 L (1,996 cc)	151 kW (205 PS; 202 hp)	301 N⋅m (222 lbf⋅ft) at 2750 rpm	8.0 s	237 km/h (147 mph)	1993–1997
3.0 12V V6	V6	3.0 L (2,959 cc)	141 kW (192 PS; 189 hp)	261 N⋅m (193 lbf⋅ft) at 4900 rpm	8.1 s	230 km/h (140 mph)	1987–1989
3.0 12V V6 (cat)	V6	3.0 L (2,959 cc)	135 kW (184 PS; 181 hp)	261 N⋅m (193 lbf⋅ft) at 4900 rpm	8.1 s	230 km/h (140 mph)	1990–1992
3.0 12V V6 Super	V6	3.0 L (2,959 cc)	132 kW (180 PS; 178 hp)	255 N⋅m (188 lbf⋅ft) at 4400 rpm	8.0 s	230 km/h (140 mph)	1992–1997
3.0 12V V6 QV	V6	3.0 L (2,959 cc)	147 kW (200 PS; 197 hp)	274 N⋅m (202 lbf⋅ft) at 4400 rpm	7.7 s	237 km/h (147 mph)	1990–1992
3.0 24V V6 Super	V6	3.0 L (2,959 cc)	154 kW (210 PS; 207 hp)	266 N⋅m (196 lbf⋅ft) at 5000 rpm	8.0 s	240 km/h (150 mph)	1993–1997
3.0 24V V6 QV	V6	3.0 L (2,959 cc)	171 kW (232 PS; 229 hp)	276 N⋅m (204 lbf⋅ft) at 5000 rpm	7.5 s	245 km/h (152 mph)	1993–1997
3.0 24V V6 Q4	V6	3.0 L (2,959 cc)	171 kW (232 PS; 229 hp)	276 N⋅m (204 lbf⋅ft) at 5000 rpm	7.7 s	240 km/h (150 mph)	1993–1997
Diesel engines
2.5 Turbodiesel	I4	2.5 L (2,499 cc)	86 kW (117 PS; 115 hp)	260 N⋅m (190 lbf⋅ft) at 2200 rpm	11.1 s	200 km/h (120 mph)	1987–1992
2.5 Turbodiesel	I4	2.5 L (2,499 cc)	92 kW (125 PS; 123 hp)	288 N⋅m (212 lbf⋅ft) at 2000 rpm	10.8 s	202 km/h (126 mph)	1992–1997

== Concept cars and variants ==
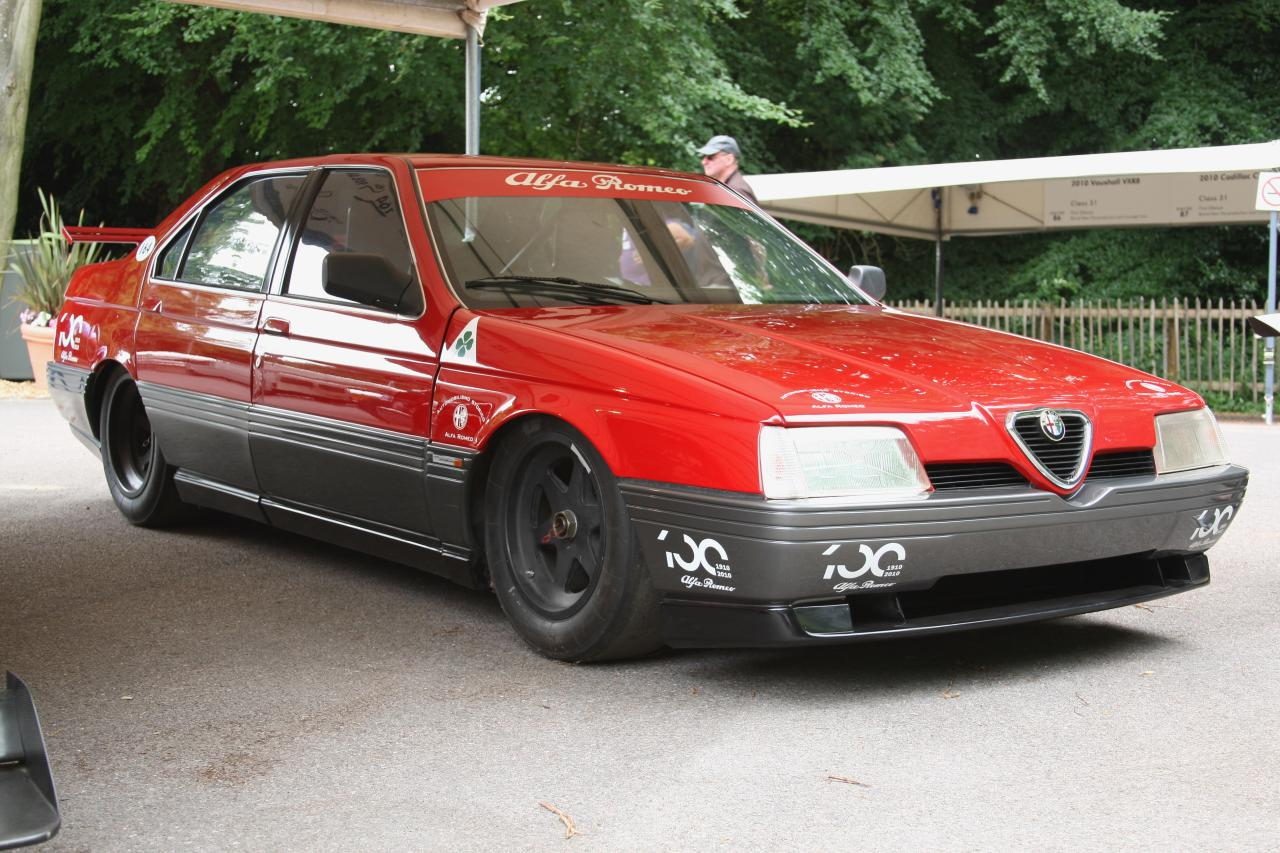
164 Pro-Car at the 2010 Goodwood Festival of Speed

In 1991, a shortened version of the 164 platform served as the basis of the all-wheel drive Alfa Romeo Proteo concept, which never eventuated.

The 164 also served as the basis of the Italdesign Scighera concept sports car unveiled in 1997. The Scighera sported the same 3.0-litre engine as the 164 but with 2 turbochargers.

In 1988, Alfa Romeo produced the 164 Pro-Car featuring a mid-engine layout and powered by the Alfa Romeo V1035 3.5-litre V10 engine. This unusual powerplant was originally planned to be used by the Ligier F1 team and was rated at 620 hp (462 kW; 629 PS) at 13,300 rpm and 340 N⋅m (250 lb⋅ft) of torque at 9,500 rpm. Weighing only 750 kg (1,653 lb), the 164 Pro-Car achieved a top speed of 340 km/h (211 mph) and had a quarter mile time of 9.7 seconds. It was planned to race in a special racing series, as a support event to Formula One Grand Prix. With Alfa Romeo being the only manufacturer to produce a car for this series, the project was ultimately cancelled. Only one rolling chassis with the Alfa Romeo V10 was built by Motor Racing Developments Ltd., the company behind the Brabham Formula One team, which was owned by Alfa Romeo at the time.

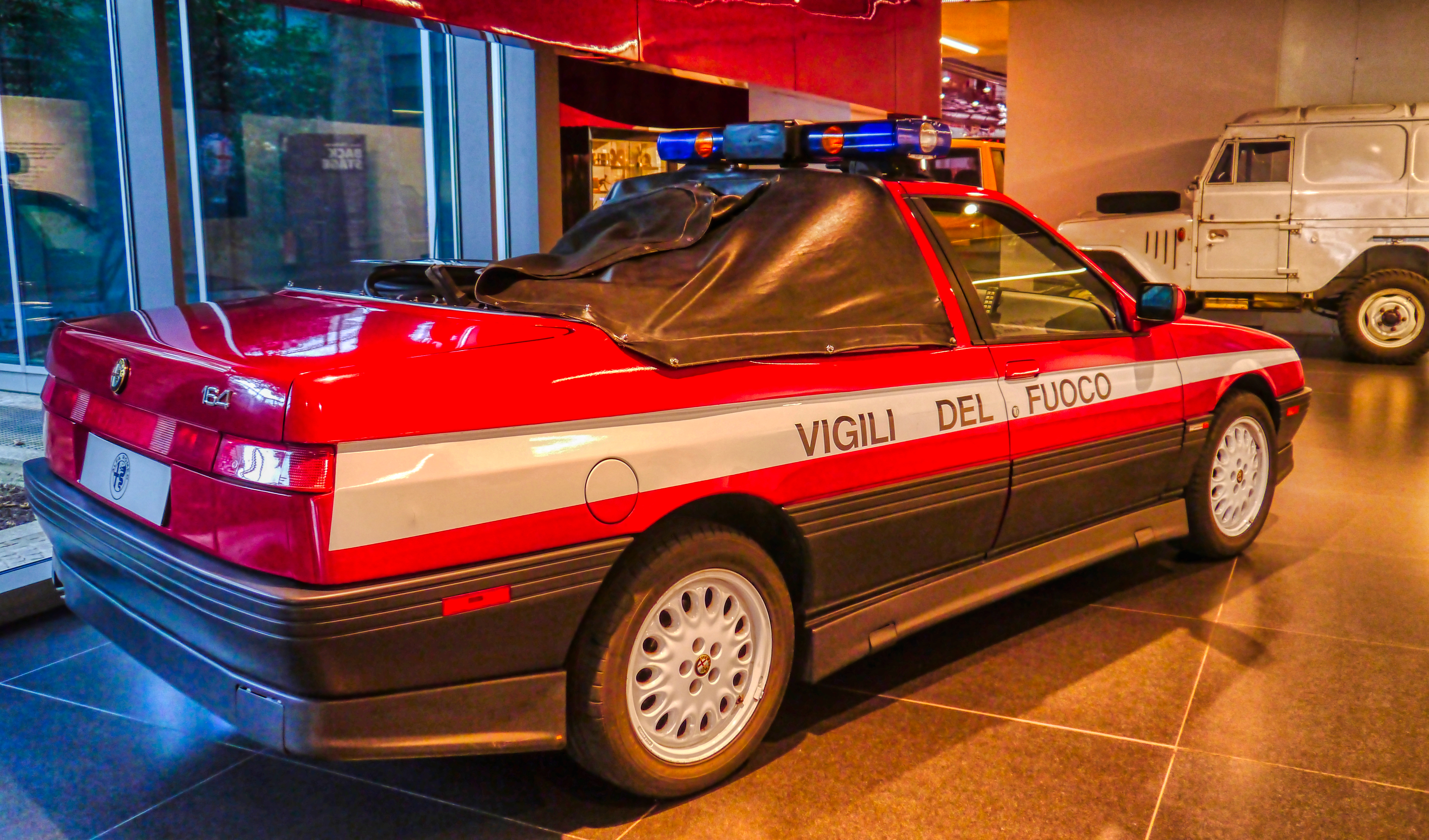
164 Vigili del Fuoco

A 2-door "Vigili del Fuoco" (Italian for fire brigade) pick-up version now exhibited at the Alfa Romeo Museum, was produced as part of the brand's practice of supplying specially modified vehicles for use by rescue teams at racing tracks.

== See also ==
- BMW M1 Procar Championship
- Alfa Romeo in Formula One
