= Alfa Romeo V6 engine =

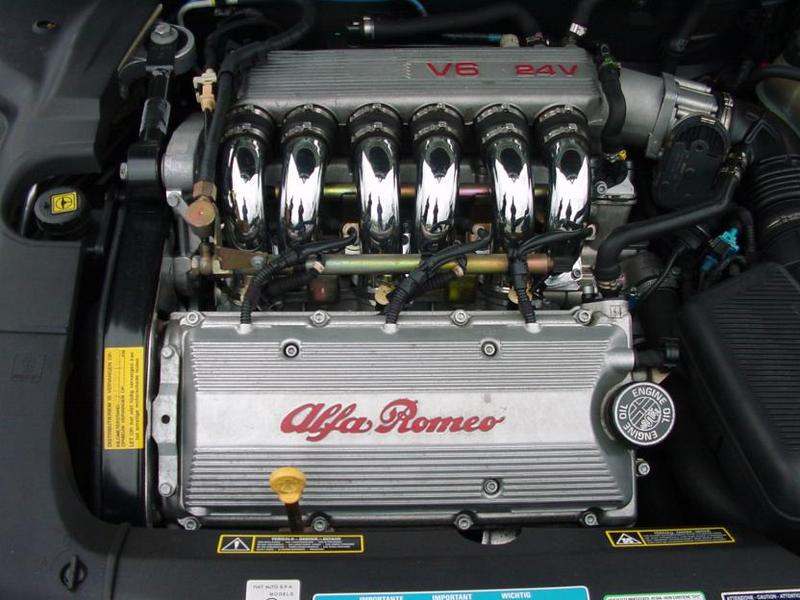
- Alfa Romeo 3.0 V6 24V

Overview
- Manufacturer: Alfa Romeo (1979–1986); Alfa Lancia Industriale (1987–1991); Fiat Auto (1991–2005)
- Designer: Giuseppe Busso
- Also called: Alfa Romeo V6 Busso
- Production: 1979–2005

Layout
- Configuration: 60° V6
- Displacement: 2.0 L (1,996 cc; 121.8 cu in); 2.5 L (2,492 cc; 152.1 cu in); 2.8 L (2,784 cc; 169.9 cu in); 2.9 L (2,934 cc; 179.0 cu in); 3.0 L (2,959 cc; 180.6 cu in); 3.2 L (3,179 cc; 194.0 cu in)
- Cylinder bore: 80 mm (3.15 in); 88 mm (3.46 in); 93 mm (3.66 in)
- Piston stroke: 66.2 mm (2.61 in); 68.3 mm (2.69 in); 72 mm (2.83 in); 72.6 mm (2.86 in); 78 mm (3.07 in)
- Cylinder block material: Aluminium
- Cylinder head material: Aluminium
- Valvetrain: SOHC/DOHC 60° 2/4 valves x cylinder, respectively
- Compression ratio: 8.0:1 – 10.5:1

Combustion
- Turbocharger: Mitsubishi TD 05H (164); Garrett T25 (GTV, 166)
- Fuel system: 6 Dell'Orto carburetors Fuel injection
- Management: Bosch L-Jetronic and Motronic
- Fuel type: Petrol
- Oil system: Wet sump
- Cooling system: Water-cooled

Output
- Power output: 97–184 kW (132–250 PS)
- Specific power: 66.1 PS (48.6 kW; 65.2 hp)/L–78.6 PS (57.8 kW; 77.5 hp)/L n/a 105.2 PS (77.4 kW; 103.8 hp)/L turbo
- Torque output: 178–300 N⋅m (131–221 lb⋅ft)

Dimensions
- Dry weight: 2.5 V6 135 kg (298 lb) (without ancillaries); 375 lb (170 kg) Alfa Romeo SOHC V6

Chronology
- Predecessor: Alfa Romeo straight-6
- Successor: JTS engine

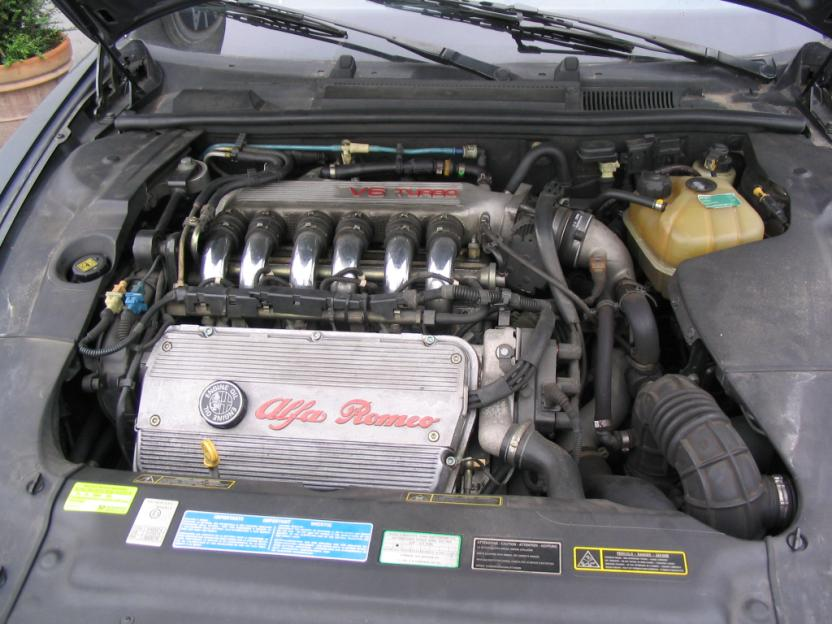
2.0L V6 12V Turbo from Alfa Romeo 166

The Alfa Romeo V6 engine (also called the Busso V6) is a 60° V6 engine made by Alfa Romeo from 1979 to 2005. It was developed in the early 1970s by Giuseppe Busso, and first used on the Alfa 6 with a displacement of 2.5 L (2,492 cc) and a SOHC 12-valve cylinder head. Later versions ranged from 1,996 to 3,179 cc (1.996 to 3.179 L) and had DOHC 24-valve valvetrains. The original design had short pushrods for the exhaust valves in a design similar to earlier Lancia Fulvia engines. The first DOHC version was in the 1993 Alfa Romeo 164, with an aluminium alloy engine block and head with sodium filled exhaust valves.

The Alfa Romeo V6 has been used in kit cars like the Ultima GTR, Hawk HF Series, and DAX, as well as the Gillet Vertigo sports car and the Lancia Aurelia B20GT Outlaw. In August 2011 EVO magazine wrote that "the original Alfa Romeo V6 was the most glorious-sounding six-cylinder road engine ever," and has been called the "Violin of Arese" or "Alfa's Violin". The Alfa Romeo V6 engine has also been used in ice resurfacer made by engo Ltd. in Italy.

== 12V, two valve ==
=== 2.0 ===
A 2.0 L; 121.8 cu in (1,996 cc) version was introduced in 1983. Both carburetted 136 PS (100 kW; 134 hp) and fuel-injected 132 PS (97 kW; 130 hp) versions were available from the start.

Applications:

- 1983–1986 Alfa Romeo Alfa 6
- 1984–1987 Alfa Romeo 90

=== 2.0 Turbo ===
A 2.0 L; 121.8 cu in (1,996 cc) turbocharged version, derived from the 3.0 L 12v, first with total digital management, was introduced in 1991 in the Alfa Romeo 164 with 210 PS (154 kW; 207 hp). The engine has a bore and stroke of 80 mm × 66.2 mm (3.15 in × 2.61 in). It was mainly intended for domestic market, due to Italian law at the time taxing cars with engines with larger displacement than two liters at a higher rate.

Applications:

- 1991–1992 Alfa Romeo 164
- 1992–1997 Alfa Romeo 164 Super
- 1994–2000 Alfa Romeo GTV
- 1998–2000 Alfa Romeo Spider
- 1996–2000 Alfa Romeo 166 Super

=== 2.5 ===
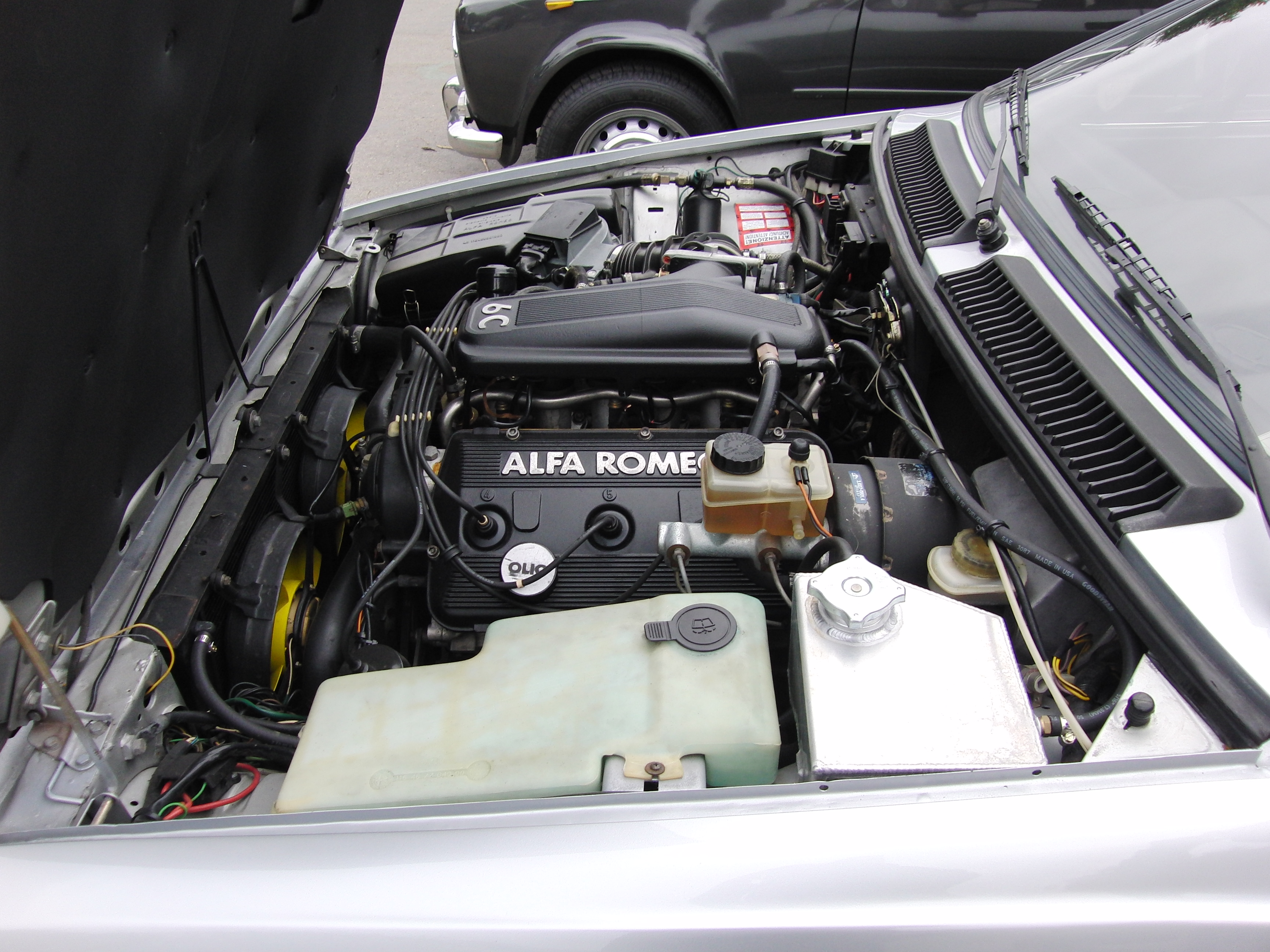
Longitudinal 2.5L in a GTV6

The original engine displaced 2.5 L; 152.1 cu in (2,492 cc) and produced 158 PS (116 kW; 156 hp). It was a 2-valve-per-cylinder design with a single belt-driven camshaft per cylinder bank and six carburettors. The engine has a bore and stroke of 88 mm × 68.3 mm (3.46 in × 2.69 in).

The Bosch L-Jetronic fuel injection was added for the 1983 Alfa 6, which produced the same 158 PS (116 kW; 156 hp). The 2-valve engine ended its life in the Alfa 155, where there were two series for this engine, the 2.5 L; 152.1 cu in (2,492 cc) developing 166 PS (122 kW; 164 hp). Differences between them were small and only on torque and power delivery producing exactly the same horsepower.

Applications:

- 1979–1986 Alfa Romeo Alfa 6
- 1980–1986 Alfa Romeo GTV6 (Alfa Romeo Alfetta GTV6 2.5)
- 1984–1987 Alfa Romeo 90
- 1985–1991 Alfa Romeo 75/Milano
- 1992–1997 Alfa Romeo 155
- 1993–1996 Fiat Croma
- 1987–1989 Rayton Fissore Magnum V6
- 1982 AC 3000ME MkII Prototype

=== 2.8 Gleich ===
In 1982, the German Alfa Romeo dealer and tuner Gleich offered a 2.8 conversion of the GTV6 2.5 engine. Dieter Gleich was sure that engine displacement enlargement is still the best and, for the life of the engine, the healthiest way of tuning. The engine capacity was increased to nearly 2.8 liters by using new bushings and custom-built forged Mahle pistons while the compression ratio was raised from 9.5 to 10.5:1. The 2.5 liter was rebored to 93 mm (3.66 in). Total displacement was 2,783.7 cc (2.8 L). Power produced were 191 PS (140 kW; 188 hp) at 6,300 rpm and torque 24.6 kg⋅m (241 N⋅m; 178 lbf⋅ft) at 4200 rpm.

The magazine "Sport driver" tested a 2.8 Gleich powered GTV6 in June 1982:

"After engaging the first gear and a somewhat careless step on the gas pedal you get a touched feel to the epiphany GTV6 shot, accompanied by the typical Alfa Romeo exhaust sound. It was a pleasure. The fact was the sprint from 0 to 100 km/h (62 mph) is not further under the seven-second limited by a tricky-to-be-shifted five-speed gearbox. The really vehement propulsion waned only when the speedometer 230 km/h (143 mph) mark has left behind. Another eye-opening experience awaits when you realize that the lightning speed to 7000 rpm rotating in any gear pinion even in fifth gear still from 1500 rpm is completely smooth."

Applications:

- 1982 Alfa Romeo Alfetta GTV6 2.8 Gleich

=== 3.0 SA (Autodelta) ===
The original 2.5 engine as used in the Alfa 6 was bored and stroked by Autodelta, the former Alfa Romeo racing department to match the racing rules for South African and Australian championships. Bore was increased from 88 mm (3.46 in) to 93 mm (3.66 in) and a new crankshaft stroked to 72 mm (2.83 in). The total displacement was 2,934.5 cc (2.9 L) and it's a totally different engine from the later 2,959 cc (3.0 L) that powered the 75/Milano models. It was, too, a 2-valve-per-cylinder design with a single belt-driven camshaft per cylinder bank and six carburettors. Special camshafts and carbs were used giving a power figure of 176.4 PS (130 kW; 174 hp) at 5800 rpm. Torque was 222 N⋅m (164 lb⋅ft) at 4300 rpm, while compression ratio was 9:1.

Only 174 complete GTV6 3.0 SA cars were produced in 1984, plus 68 more in 1985. The last ones built were fitted with electronic fuel injection.

The 3.0 GTV6 was sold in South Africa in 1983–1985, predating the release of the 3.0 L displacement to the rest of the world. This engine was an Autodelta hand made conversion based on Alfa Sei 2.5 carbureted engines enlarged to bore and stroke of 93 mm × 72 mm (3.7 in × 2.8 in).

Applications:

- 1984–1985 Alfa Romeo Alfetta GTV6 3.0 SA

=== 3.0 ===
Pulled by the racing success of the 3.0 SA engine and looking for more power to boost 75/Milano sales in countries like USA, Alfa Romeo introduced a production version of the 3.0 engine. Bore was 93 mm (3.66 in), as the 3.0 SA, but stroke was increased to 72.6 mm (2.86 in). The total displacement was 2,959 cc (3.0 L). As the previous engines, it was a 2-valve-per-cylinder design with a single belt-driven camshaft per cylinder bank. The main difference with the racing 3.0 SA was the use of modern L-Jetronic fuel injection system by Bosch. Power figures vary from 188 PS (138 kW; 185 hp) to 192 PS (141 kW; 189 hp) at 5800 rpm, with compression ratio 9:1.

This engine was modified for transverse placement in the 164 and fitted with a high-performance camshaft and low-restriction exhaust, producing 192 PS (141 kW; 189 hp) in standard form, 184 PS (135 kW; 181 hp) when a catalyzer was added in 1991, with the Cloverleaf version producing 200 PS (147 kW; 197 hp).

The same engine was fitted to the SZ and RZ — ES30 Zagato, but even more finely tuned with wilder cams and high compression pistons to a further 210 PS (154 kW; 207 hp).

Applications:

- 1987–1991 Alfa Romeo 75/Milano
- 1988–1997 Alfa Romeo 164
- 1989–1991 Alfa Romeo SZ
- 1992–1994 Alfa Romeo RZ
- 1992–1994 Lancia Thema
- 1993–2000 Alfa Romeo Spider
- 1994 Alfa Romeo GTV

== 24V, four valve ==
=== 2.5 24V ===
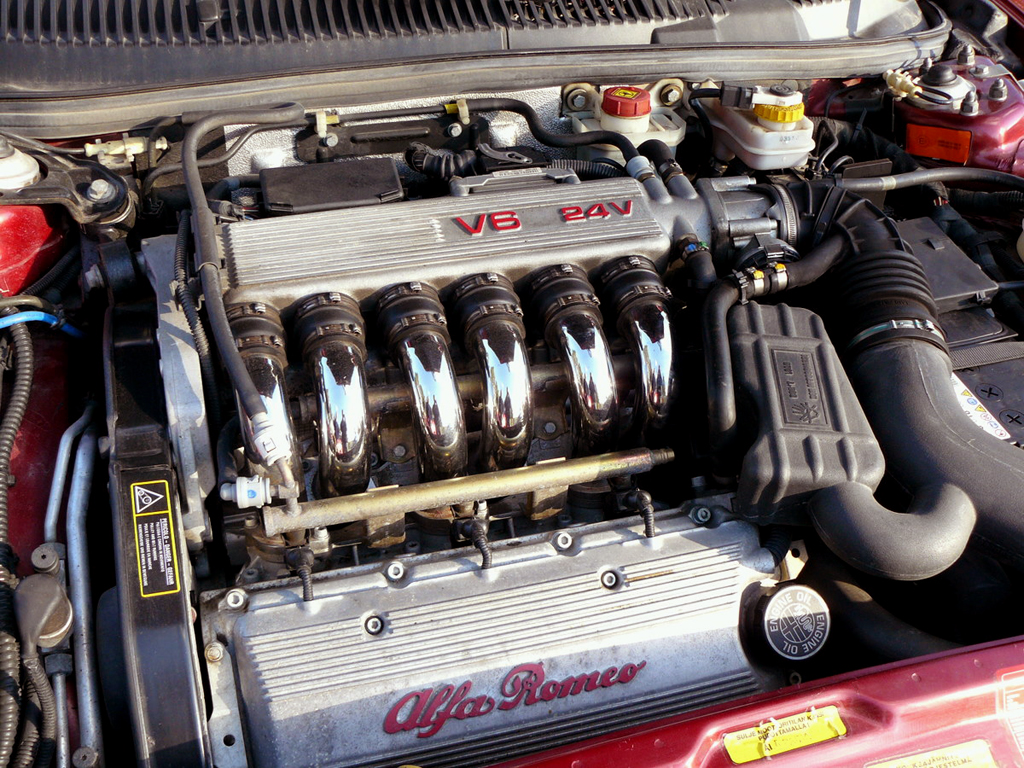
24V 2.5L from an Alfa Romeo 156

A four-valve version was introduced in 1997 with the Alfa Romeo 156. The engine now produced 190 PS (140 kW; 187 hp). In 2001, the V6 was uprated to 192 PS (141 kW; 189 hp). The 166 used a slightly detuned version to make more low rev torque. This engine version was awarded as the International Engine of the Year in 2000. The engine has a bore and stroke of 88 mm × 68.3 mm (3.46 in × 2.69 in), the same as the two-valve.

Applications:

- 1996–2005 Alfa Romeo 156
- 1996–2007 Alfa Romeo 166

=== 3.0 24V ===
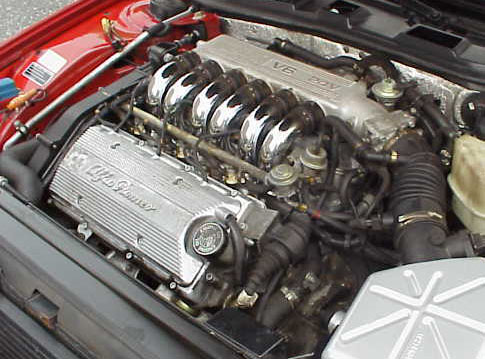
Alfa Romeo 164 24V 3.0L

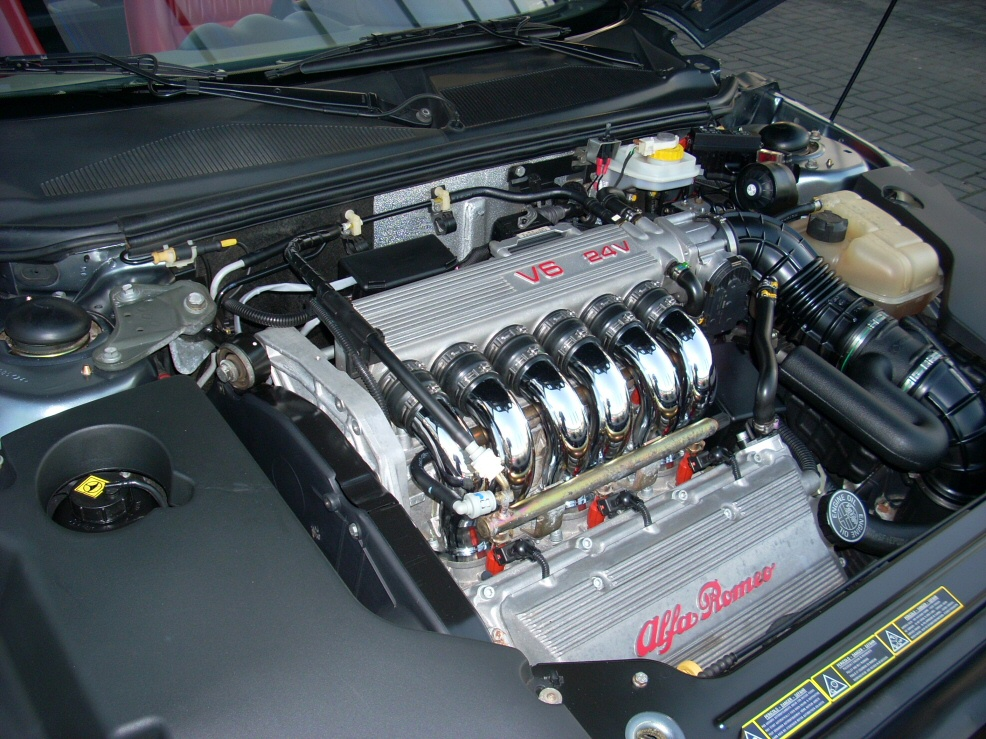
3.0L V6 24V, newer version with red lettering

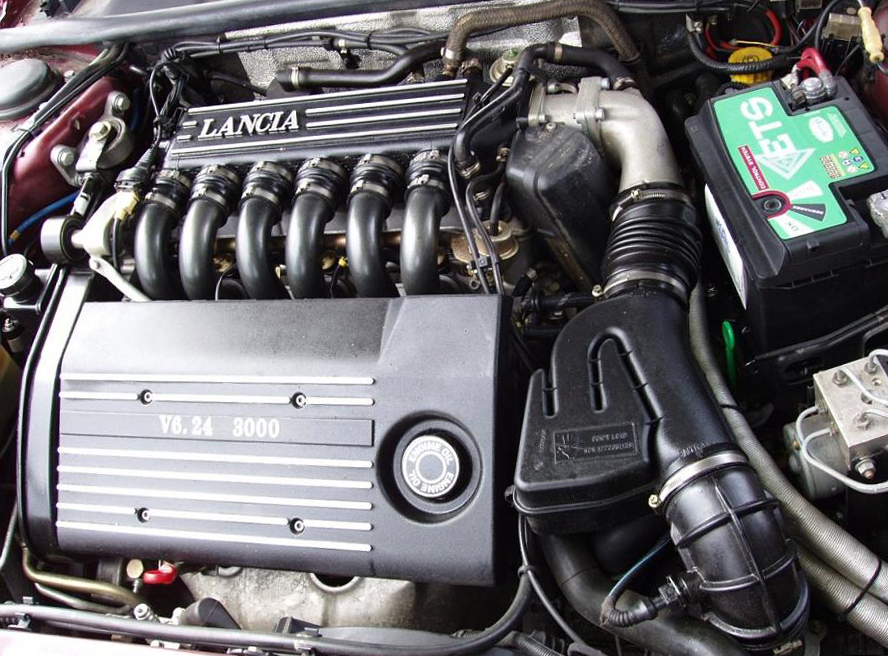
Lancia Kappa 3.0L 24V had black intake runners

The engine was upgraded to dual overhead cams and four valves per cylinder in 1993. Due to this and other refinements, this engine produced 211 PS (155 kW; 208 hp) for the regular 1993 Alfa Romeo 164, with 230 PS (169 kW; 227 hp) and 276 N⋅m (204 lbf⋅ft) in the 164 QV with its engine producing 232 PS (171 kW; 229 hp) on the Q4 model which in its final production run in 1996, it got reduced to 228 PS (168 kW; 225 hp) but with increased torque. The final run of 3.0 V6 engines in the GTV, Spider and 166 range, produced 218–220 PS (160–162 kW; 215–217 hp) in the Euro 3-compliant version. The engine has a bore and stroke of 93 mm × 72.6 mm (3.66 in × 2.86 in), the same as the two-valve.

Applications:

- 1991 Alfa Romeo Proteo concept car
- 1993–1997 Alfa Romeo 164
- 1994–2000 Lancia Kappa
- 1996–2003 Alfa Romeo GTV
- 2000–2003 Alfa Romeo Spider
- 1996–2007 Alfa Romeo 166
- 2001–2008 Lancia Thesis
- 1998–present Gillet Vertigo (Vertigo also used a 3.6 L and 3.9 L version)

=== 3.2 24V ===
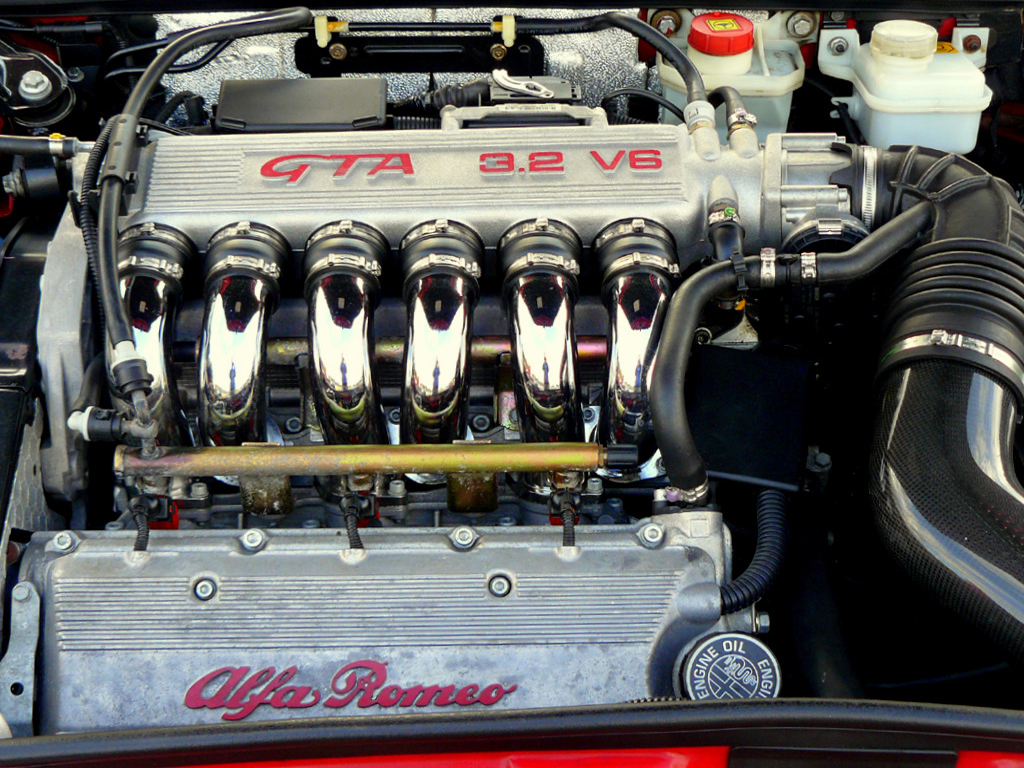
Alfa Romeo 147 GTA 3.2L

In 2002 Alfa Romeo introduced the 156 and 147 GTA with a 3.2 L; 194.0 cu in (3,179 cc) version of the V6 with 250 PS (184 kW; 247 hp) and 300 N⋅m (221 lbf⋅ft) of torque. Later this engine was also used in the Alfa Romeo 166, GTV, Spider and Alfa Romeo GT in a slightly detuned form 240 PS (177 kW; 237 hp). The engine has a bore and stroke 93 mm × 78 mm (3.66 in × 3.07 in). In Lancia this engine produced 230 PS (169 kW; 227 hp).

Applications:

- 2002–2005 Alfa Romeo 156 GTA
- 2002–2005 Alfa Romeo 147 GTA
- 2002–2004 Alfa Romeo GTV
- 2002–2004 Alfa Romeo Spider
- 2003–2007 Alfa Romeo 166
- 2003–2010 Alfa Romeo GT
- 2003–2009 Lancia Thesis

=== 3.5 24V ===
In December 2002, at the Bologna Motor Show, Alfa Romeo displayed a 156 GTAm prototype, built by N-Technology, with 3458cc. The power was increased to 300 PS at 6,800rpm. The engine had a bore and stroke of 97 mm x 78 mm. This version never came to production, and it was based on N-Technology's experience racing the 156 GTA Super Touring.

Application:

- 2002 Alfa Romeo 156 GTAm N.Technology

==== 2.5 DTM ====
Alfa Romeo raced, in early 1990s, a 2.5-litre engine based on Busso's 60º V6. The engine was substantially revised and had a difference bore and stroke from the 2.5 standard engine, respectively, 93 mm x 61.3 mm, and making 420 bhp (313 kW) at 11,800 rpm with a torque of 294 Nm. Alfa Romeo, during the 1993–1996 era of DTM/ITC, racked up an incredible thirty-eight victories of a total of eighty-nine starts. The V6-engined machine also qualified on pole nineteen times and set the fastest lap in forty-two races.

Application:

- Alfa Romeo 155 V6 TI.

Later, Alfa Romeo also raced a development of the Peugeot, Renault, Volvo 90° V6 engine, with 490 PS at 11,900 rpm, in the 1996 DTM Championship.

=== Other 24V displacements ===
Alfa Romeo worked on other displacements, specifically a 2.8L (2846cc), with 88 mm bore (same as the 2.5 liter engine) and a 78 mm stroke (same as the 3.2 liter engine). According to Alfa Romeo engineers, there were considerable gains, especially in torque. However, this engine never made it into series production. Some private workshops work on these engines to obtain larger displacements (and power outputs), with diameters of 101 mm (3.75L) or even 103 mm (3.9L).

== Engine applications — Table ==
Layout	Engine	Cylinder Head	12 valves						24 valves		
Layout	Engine	Version	2.0	2.0 Turbo	2.5	2.8 Gleich	3.0 Autodelta	3.0	2.5	3.0	3.2
Layout	Engine	Bore	80		88	93	93	93	88	93	93
Layout	Engine	Stroke	66,2		68.3	68.3	72.0	72.6	68.3	72.6	78.0
Layout	Engine	Capacity	1 996		2 492	2 784	2 934	2 959	2 492	2 959	3 179
Longitudinal	Alfa Romeo Alfa 6		1983–1986		1979–1986						
Longitudinal	Alfa Romeo GTV6 (Alfetta)				1980–1986	1982	1984–1985				
Longitudinal	Alfa Romeo 90		1984–1987		1984–1987						
Longitudinal	Alfa Romeo 75/Milano				1985–1991			1987–1991			
Longitudinal	Alfa Romeo SZ							1989–1991			
Longitudinal	Alfa Romeo RZ							1992–1994			
Transverse	Alfa Romeo 164			1991–1997				1988–1997		1993–1997	
Transverse	Alfa Romeo 155				1992–1997						
Transverse	Alfa Romeo GTV (916)			1994–2000				1994		1996–2003	2002–2004
Transverse	Alfa Romeo Spider (916)			1998–2000				1993–2000		2000–2003	2002–2004
Transverse	Alfa Romeo 156								1996–2005		
Transverse	Alfa Romeo 166			1996–2000					1996–2007	1996–2007	2003–2007
Transverse	Alfa Romeo 156 GTA										2002–2005
Transverse	Alfa Romeo 147 GTA										2002–2005
Transverse	Alfa Romeo GT										2003–2010
Transverse	Fiat Croma				1993–1996						
Transverse	Lancia Thema							1992–1994			
Transverse	Lancia Kappa									1994–2000	
Transverse	Lancia Thesis									2001–2008	2003–2009

== Production end ==
The V6 production ended in 2005 at Alfa Romeo Arese Plant; a stock of five thousand were built, to be used in Lancia Thesis, Alfa 166 and Alfa GT models. The engine was replaced in the 159 and Brera by a new 3.2 L V6 unit combining a General Motors-designed engine block with Alfa Romeo cylinder heads and induction. British automotive engineering company Cosworth was keen to buy assembly lines of the Alfa Romeo V6 engine, but the Italian company did not want to sell it. The last version of 3.2 L engine was Euro4 compliant, so it would have been possible to produce it a couple of years more. The engine's designer Giuseppe Busso died within a couple of days after the last engine was produced in Arese.

Since 2015, Fiat Powertrain manufactures the all-new 690T, Ferrari-derived 90° V6 twin-turbo engine for the Giulia Quadrifoglio, Stelvio Quadrifoglio and Giulia GTA/GTA-m models.

== See also ==
- Alfa Romeo Twin Cam engine
- Alfa Romeo Twin Spark engine
