= Alfa Romeo Proteo =

Alfa Romeo Protèo
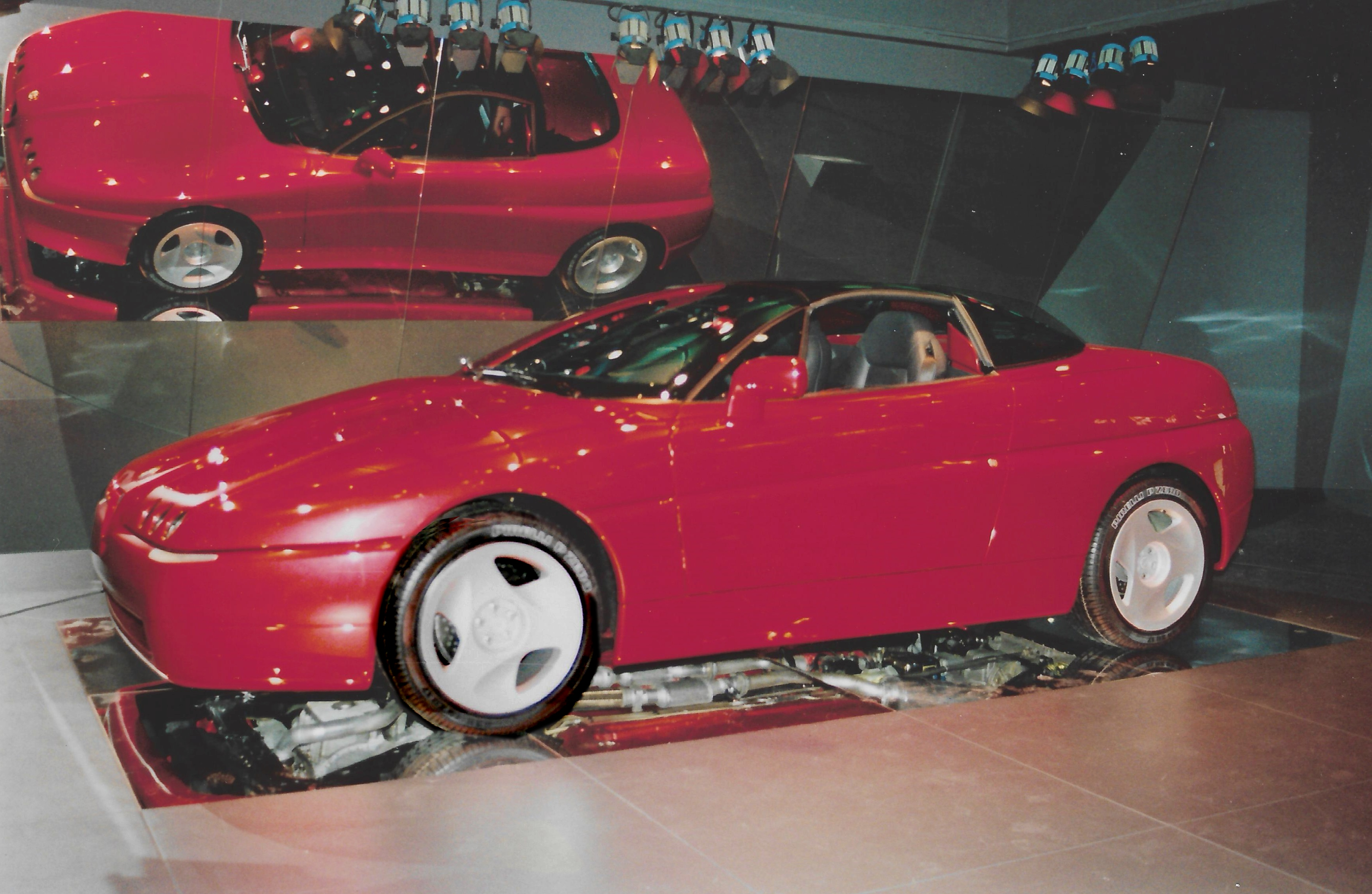

Overview
- Manufacturer: Alfa Romeo; Stola
- Also called: Alfa Romeo 164 Proteo
- Production: 1990–1991
- Designer: Alberto Bertelli at Centro Stile Alfa Romeo under Walter de Silva

Body and chassis
- Class: Concept car
- Body style: 2-door coupé cabriolet
- Layout: Front-engine four-wheel drive
- Related: Alfa Romeo 164

Powertrain
- Engine: 3.0L Alfa Romeo 24V V6
- Transmission: 5-speed manual

Dimensions
- Length: 4,148 mm (163.3 in)
- Curb weight: 1,467 kg (3,234 lb)

The Alfa Romeo Protèo is a concept car that was exhibited at the Geneva Motor Show in 1991. It is a 2-door coupé cabriolet with folding roof, featuring a 3.0 liter quad-cam 24-valve (2959 cc), 60 degree V6 coupled with a 5-speed manual transmission, with a top speed of 250 km/h (155 mph). The engine used in Protèo produces 260 PS (191 kW; 256 hp). The Protèo uses shortened floorpan used in Alfa Romeo 164 and features four wheel drive and steering. Many of the Protèo's design cues were influenced by the Alfa Romeo 916 series GTV/Spider, which was designed in July 1988. First design sketches by Alberto Bertelli are dated for December 1989. The name Protèo is derived from a Greek deity Proteus. The concept was presented with dark metallescent red paintwork, that was later included in the Alfa Romeo range as Rosso Proteo.

The prototype is on display at the Alfa Romeo History Museum in Arese, Italy.
