= Alfa Romeo Twin Spark engine =

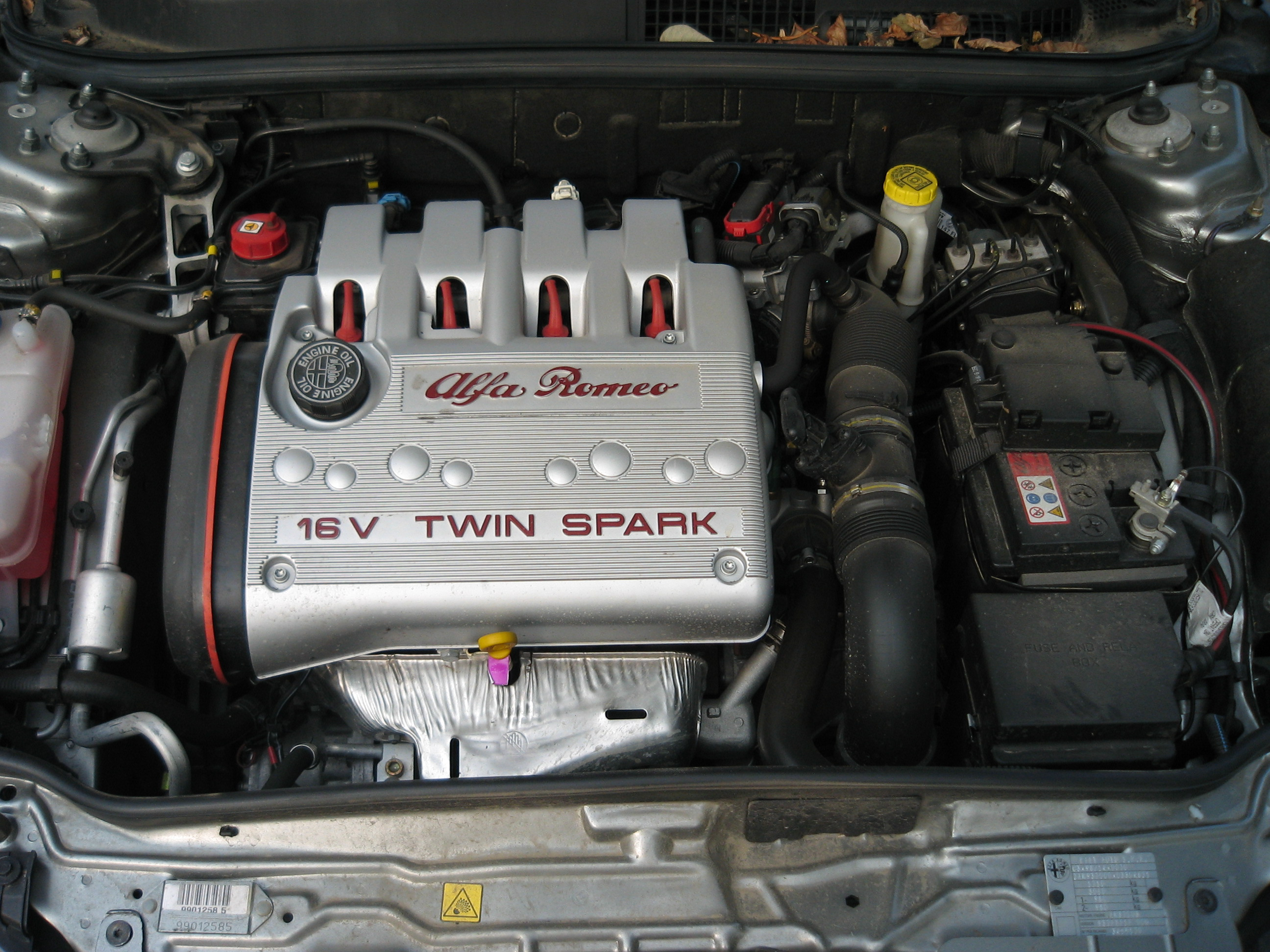

Overview
- Manufacturer: Alfa Romeo Auto (1986) Alfa-Lancia Industriale (1987-1991) Fiat Auto (1991-2007) Fiat Group Automobiles (2007-2009)
- Production: 1986–2009

Layout
- Configuration: Naturally aspirated straight-4
- Displacement: 1.4 L (1,370 cc); 1.6 L (1,598 cc); 1.7 L (1,747 cc); 1.7 L (1,748 cc); 1.8 L (1,773 cc); 2.0 L (1,962 cc); 2.0 L (1,969 cc); 2.0 L (1,995 cc)
- Cylinder block material: Aluminium (Alfa Romeo Twin Cam engine); Cast iron (Fiat Pratola Serra modular engines)
- Cylinder head material: Aluminum
- Valvetrain: DOHC 2/4 valves per cylinder

Combustion
- Fuel system: Carburetor, Fuel injection
- Fuel type: Petrol

Output
- Power output: 103–155 PS (76–114 kW; 102–153 bhp)

Chronology
- Predecessor: Alfa Romeo Twin Cam
- Successor: Alfa Romeo JTS engine

Alfa Romeo Twin Spark (TS) technology was used for the first time in the Alfa Romeo Grand Prix car in 1914. In the early 1960s it was used in their race cars (GTA, TZ) to enable it to achieve a higher power output from its engines. In the mid-1980s, Alfa Romeo brought dual-spark ignition to its road cars, including the Alfa Romeo 75.

== The 'Twin Spark' engines ==
In the current Alfa Romeo world the "Twin Spark" name usually refers to the dual ignition engines installed in Alfa Romeo cars. The 8-valve engine was fitted initially to the Alfa Romeo 75 but also the 164 and 155. The 16-valve engines appeared in the 145, 146, 155, 156, 147, 166, Alfa Romeo GTV & Spider and Alfa Romeo GT models.

The TS series are all twin cam 4-cylinder inline engines. The original 8-valve engine was derived from Alfa's Twin Cam family, and featured a light alloy (silicon enhanced aluminium alloy) block + head, wet-cooled iron cylinder liners, and the camshafts were driven by a single duplex timing chain. So, similar design to the earlier and famous Alfa Romeo Twin Cam engines, but with narrower valve angle and double ignition on this model.

The later 16-valve engines were part of Fiat's "Pratola Serra" (B family) modular engine series, and had a heavier cast-iron block engine, with an alloy head, and the camshafts were belt driven. The Twin Spark name comes from the fact that there are two spark plugs per cylinder. It was cast iron for its higher beam strength, less complexity and hence lower production costs. When new, these engines were notable for their high efficiency as demonstrated by the BMEP (brake mean effective pressures) exerted upon the piston crowns.

The two sparks plugs on the 8V Alfa Twin Spark engines fire at the same time and are symmetrically placed around the vertical line passing through the intake and exhaust valve centers. The flame front travels less distance which allows less ignition advance to be used. Also, leaner mixtures can also be tolerated for better fuel economy. The 8V engine also has 8 identical spark plugs. There is no room for a centrally positioned spark plug due to 2-valve design which uses rather large 44 mm diameter inlet valve on the 2.0 engine. On the newer models using the 8V engine the system uses the popular wasted spark system as well. (as also used in Ford EDIS), combining one coil for 2 plugs on opposite phase sister cylinders like 1-4, 2-3 on 4 cylinder engine.

On the Alfa 16V Twin Spark engines one spark plug is ideally located in the centre of the cylinder, as is common in virtually all multi-valve configuration engines. In order to accommodate a second spark plug in the 4-valve combustion chamber, a smaller diameter spark plug is located the very edge of the combustion chamber between an inlet and an exhaust valve. The location of the additional plug means that its impact on maximum performance is marginal. However the engine is able to idle smoothly in very lean conditions (up to 18:1 AFR), this suggests the addition plug is here to improve combustion efficiency under light loads. The next generation Alfa fours, the JTS engines lost the second plugs gained direct injection and increased performance.

The TS 16V engines, 1.6, 1.8 and 2.0, all use a 10 mm diameter and a 14 mm diameter long life platinum electrode spark plug per cylinder. The spark plugs have a replacement interval of 100,000 kilometres (62,000 mi).

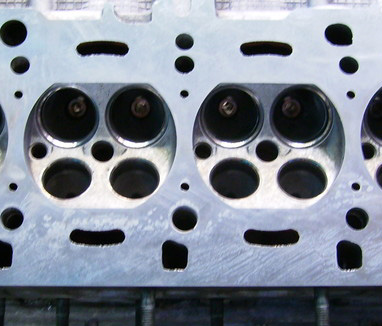
16-valve Twin Spark Head.

The 16 Valve engine features individual 'coil over plug' ignition where the timing of the ignition is controlled directly by the Bosch engine management system, with each coil firing two spark plugs simultaneously. On the earlier CF1 and CF2 16 valve engines each coil fired the plug below it and (via a short plug lead) a plug in the other cylinder that was 360° crankshaft rotation out of phase (i.e. one coil would fire a spark plug in the cylinder nearing the top of the compression stroke, and also the a spark plug in the cylinder nearing the top of the exhaust stroke (in a 4-cylinder 4-stroke engine with a 180° crank pistons 1 & 4 and pistons 2 & 3 rise and fall as pairs). So in this configuration each coil services two spark plugs and each cylinder is serviced by two coils. In case of a coil failure one of two plugs would still work.

Ignition systems that fire a plug in a cylinder on its exhaust stroke are referred to as a wasted spark ignition system; as the spark ignites nothing and so is 'wasted'. Wasted spark systems are generally used as a production economy as half the number of coils are required (which consequently have to fire twice as many times), e.g. a four-cylinder four-stroke engine (with a single plug per cylinder) requires only 2 coils alternately firing every 180° of crankshaft rotation, each coil firing every 360° crank rotation to fire all four cylinders. In the 16 Valve Twin Spark 4 coils are required by the eight plugs, so production economy was unlikely to be a factor in the adoption of a wasted spark system.

On the later CF3 (2001 on Euro 3 emissions standard) 16v TS the four coils fire both spark plugs in one cylinder (so not 1 & 4 and 2 & 3 as pairs), and may not be a wasted spark system. The potential benefits of each coil being associated with one cylinder being: halving the firing frequency - the coil is only required to fire every 720° crankshaft rotation rather than every 360° crankshaft rotation. This would double coil saturation time, reducing coil load and improving spark quality at high rpm. Some Bosch engine management system have the ability to advance and retard ignition timing in individual cylinders, which would be impossible in the CF1 and CF2 configurations as each cylinder is serviced by two coils, but could be used in the CF3 setup.

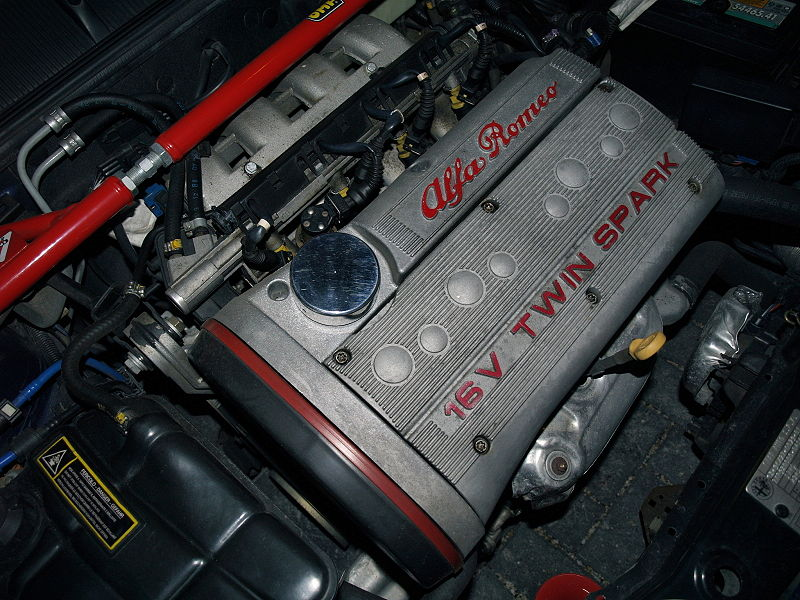
16-valve Twin Spark with older cover.

The engines also incorporate two other devices to enhance the performance under operation, the Camshaft Phase Variator and the Variable Intake Length Control (or Modular Inlet Manifold in Alfaspeak) on the later (plastic cam cover) 1.8- and 2.0-litre versions. Where both these variable systems are deployed they are controlled in tandem by the Bosch Motronic Engine Management ECU in response to rpm, load, and throttle position. According to Fiat Auto S.p.A. DTE electronic service documentation for the 156 Twin Spark (1.8/2.0):

"To optimise the quantity of air drawn into the engine the control unit checks: inlet timing on two angle positions (and) geometry of inlet ducts at two lengths (only 1.8/2.0 TS). At maximum torque speed the control unit sets the "open" phase: cam advanced by 25°, inlet casing long ducts (Only 1.8/2.0 TS). At the maximum power speed the control unit sets the "closed" phase: cam in normal position, inlet box short ducts. At idle speed the control unit sets the "closed" phase: cam in normal position and inlet box short ducts. In the other engine operating conditions, the control unit selects the most suitable configuration to optimise performance - consumption - emissions. During overrunning, the inlet ducts of the box are always short."

The advancing of the inlet camshaft opens and closes the intake valves earlier in the inlet cycle. This allows the filling of the cylinders with air/fuel mix to begin and end earlier when in advanced position thus starting to compress the mix earlier. Or the compression phase to begin later (when in not advanced cam state) by delaying the intake valve closure. The actual compression of the gases can begin only after the closure of the inlet valves so by varying the intake valve closure moment (with the variator) the effective compression ratio can be reduced in not-advanced position. This has benefits as a way to reduce the effective compression ratio but still keep the expansion ratio as before so to lower the compression phase mechanical losses. When the intake valve is also opened earlier in relation to the closing of the exhaust valves, the valve overlap (the period both inlet and exhaust valves are simultaneously open) is also increased at this mode. This promotes the scavenging effect of the exiting exhaust which causes a partial vacuum in the cylinder to further assist in filling the cylinder with a fresh charge. Also this increased overlap, may cause part of the exhaust gases to re-enter in this way make it function like internal EGR.

As with similar inlet cam phasing systems like BMW VANOS the phasing is returned to the retarded state at higher rpm to improve power and efficiency as inlet gas dynamics change with rpm. The short inlet ducts being tuned to the higher frequency and thus shorter inlet duct pressure wave.

On the 16V engines the camshaft variator is used to enhance the performance/emissions but also might be the source to the common 'diesel noise' problem often seen on high mileage used models which used the earlier internals of the variator. The same variator system is also used in many Fiat/Lancia engines like one used in Lancia Kappa 5-cylinder engine, some Fiat Bravo/Fiat Marea engines, Fiat Barchetta, Fiat Coupe, Fiat Stilo etc. models.

== Modular Inlet Manifold ==
The Alfa Romeo Modular Inlet Manifold is a variable intake system fitted to the later CF2 1.8 and 2.0 litre Twin Spark engines. It operates by switching between two separate air intake runners of different lengths (one pair for each cylinder) to either shorten or lengthen the path from the end of the intake runner (within the plenum) to the inlet valves. The system is manifold vacuum-assisted servo-operated, and controlled directly by the Bosch engine management system, as described above. Tuned-length inlet runners operate by using the harmonics created by within the inlet tract/runner by the opening and closing of the inlet valves and flow of gas during the inlet cycle. Each runner is effectively a velocity stack which reflects a positive pressure wave back down the inlet runner to maximise cylinder filling with fuel/air mix. The rpm band over which the pressure wave arrives at the open inlet valves and is able to assist in the cylinder filling is set by the length of the runner and is a relatively narrow. Swapping between runners of differing length broadens the rpm band over which benefits of the tuned inlet runners are achieved, leading to a flatter torque curve and consequently more power across the rev range.

In addition air-flow within the stock intake tubing between the throttle plate and airbox has also been maximised. This includes an 'inlet trumpet' at the end of the intake pipe within the airbox (often referred to as the "cone" by Alfisti) which is designed to improve airflow and fuel metering by reducing turbulence, (and may reflect positive pressure waves back down the intake tube). There is much discussion on about improving performance by removing the trumpet or 'de-coning' as it is often referred to, as the trumpet is thought by some to restrict air flow due to its small inlet cross-section. While "de-coning" results improvement in inlet cross-section any benefit is likely to be off set by the 'pinch effect' of an unradiused inlet, which is 0.6 - 0.5 the efficiency of a trumpet radius on the same diameter inlet

== Variable valve timing ==
Variable valve timing gave the Twin Spark engine very good performance for its cubic capacity, but it is one of the weaker areas of the 16-valve engine. The original variator that controls the cam timing is prone to wear or jam, although replacement part carries a different part number and has improved reliability. Symptoms are a slight loss of performance and a diesel type rattle from the top of the engine, which appears at startup and gradually lasts for longer. It is therefore advisable to get the variator changed regardless of its apparent condition at the 36,000 mile (60,000 km) cambelt replacement. The variator problem is not often seen in the earlier 8V Twin Spark version, as these use a different type of cam timing variator system, this is also the case for later 16v versions used in the Alfa Romeo 156 and the 147 where the weak variator was addressed.

== 8-valve Twin Spark engines ==
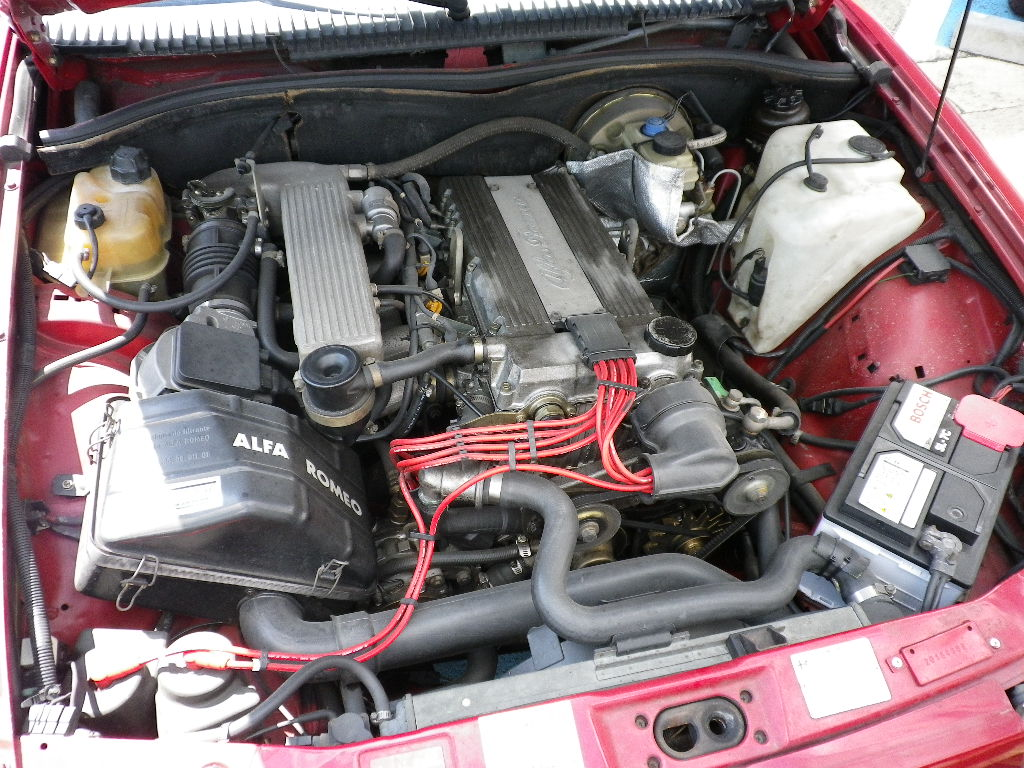
Alfa Romeo 75 8 valve Twin Spark.

- 1.7 L (1,748 cc) 84 kW (114 PS; 113 bhp) at 6000 rpm, 146 N⋅m (108 lb⋅ft) at 3500 rpm
- 1.8 L (1,773 cc) 98 kW (133 PS; 131 bhp) at 6000 rpm, 165 N⋅m (122 lb⋅ft) at 5000 rpm
- 2.0 L (1,962 cc) 109 kW (148 PS; 146 bhp) at 5800 rpm, 186 N⋅m (137 lb⋅ft) at 3000 rpm
- 2.0 L (1,995 cc) 104 kW (141 PS; 139 bhp) at 6000 rpm, 187 N⋅m (138 lb⋅ft) at 5000 rpm (cat.)

applications:

- Alfa Romeo 75
- Alfa Romeo 164
- Alfa Romeo 155

== 16-valve Twin Spark engines ==
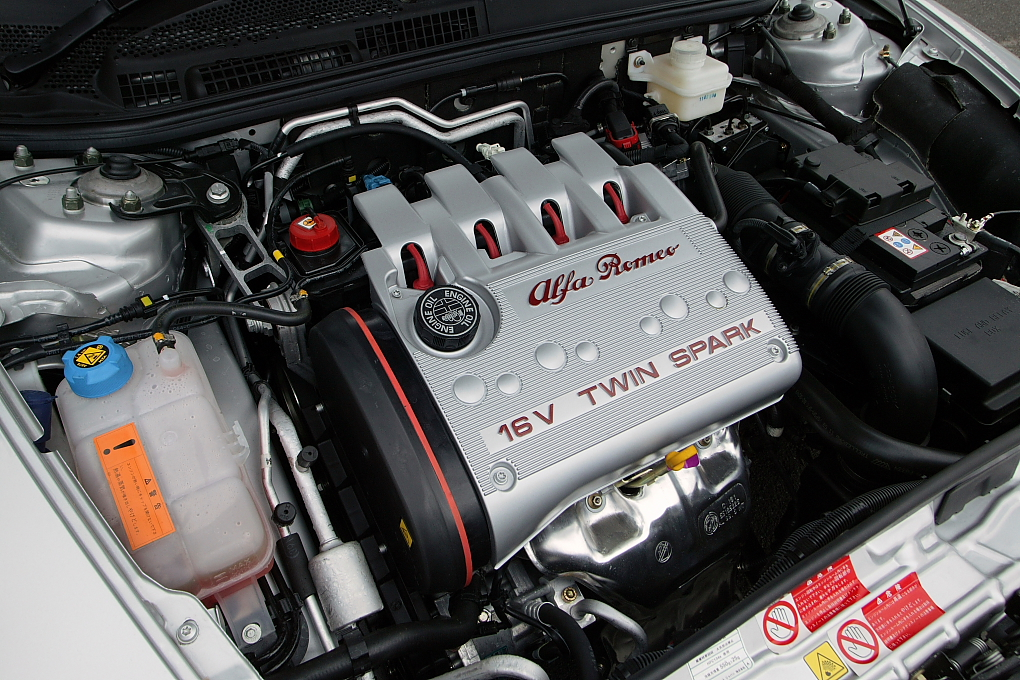
16-valve Twin Spark

- 1,370 cc (1.4 L) 76 kW (103 PS; 102 bhp) at 6300 rpm, 124 N⋅m (91 lb⋅ft) at 4600 rpm, Bore x Stroke - 82 x 64.87 mm
- 1,598 cc (1.6 L) 77–88 kW (105–120 PS; 103–118 bhp) at 5600-6200 rpm, 140–146 N⋅m (103–108 lb⋅ft) at 4200-4500 rpm, Bore x Stroke - 82 x 75.65 mm
- 1,747 cc (1.7 L) 103–106 kW (140–144 PS; 138–142 bhp) at 6500 rpm, 163–169 N⋅m (120–125 lb⋅ft) at 3500-3900 rpm, Bore x Stroke - 82 x 82.7 mm
- 1,969 cc (2.0 L) 110–114 kW (150–155 PS; 148–153 bhp) at 6400 rpm, 181–187 N⋅m (133–138 lb⋅ft) at 3500-3800 rpm, Bore x Stroke - 83 x 91 mm

Applications:

- Alfa Romeo 155
- Alfa Romeo GTV (Type 916)
- Alfa Romeo Spider (Type 916)
- Alfa Romeo 145
- Alfa Romeo 146
- Alfa Romeo 166
- Alfa Romeo 156
- Alfa Romeo 147
- Alfa Romeo GT
