= Cadillac twin-turbo V8 =

Cadillac Blackwing V8

Overview
- Manufacturer: Cadillac
- Also called: LTA; Blackwing
- Production: 2018–2020

Layout
- Configuration: 90° V8
- Displacement: 4.2 L; 255.8 cu in (4,192 cc)
- Cylinder bore: 86 mm (3.39 in)
- Piston stroke: 90.2 mm (3.55 in)
- Cylinder block material: Aluminum
- Cylinder head material: Aluminum
- Valvetrain: DOHC 4 valves x cyl.
- Compression ratio: 9.8:1

Combustion
- Turbocharger: hot-V twin scroll Twin-turbos with intercoolers
- Fuel system: Direct injection
- Fuel type: Gasoline
- Cooling system: Water-cooled

Output
- Power output: 500–550 hp (373–410 kW)
- Specific power: 131.2 hp (97.8 kW) per liter
- Torque output: 574–640 lb⋅ft (778–868 N⋅m)

Chronology
- Predecessor: Cadillac Northstar engine

The Cadillac Blackwing V8 (GM RPO LTA) is a twin-turbo DOHC V8 engine that was produced by the Cadillac Division of General Motors solely for use in its CT6-V and CT6-Platinum model years 2019 and 2020. It is a clean sheet engine design, as well as the Division's first ever twin-turbo V8 engine. The engine was branded as the "Blackwing V8" by GM technicians, and is the first Cadillac-exclusive dual overhead cam V8 engine since the Northstar V8 was dropped in 2011. Each engine was hand-built by a single technician at the Performance Build Center located inside the Corvette Assembly Plant in Bowling Green, Kentucky, and was marked with a plaque showing Blackwing V8 and the technician's name and signature.

The aluminum cylinder block features pressed-in iron liners, cross-bolted main bearing caps and houses a lightweight forged steel crankshaft, forged steel connecting rods and high strength hypereutectic aluminum pistons. There are four sodium-filled valves per cylinder.

The intercooled turbochargers are mounted between the cylinder banks in a hot-V configuration and their twin scroll design broadens their performance capability, offering quicker response and greater efficiency. These produce up to 20 psi (1.4 bar) and are matched with electronic wastegate control for more precise boost management and more responsive torque production. Ninety percent of the engine's peak torque is available at 2000 rpm and carried through 5200 rpm.

Other features include direct fuel injection, camshaft phasing, variable displacement/start-stop cylinder deactivation, and variable-pressure oiling system with piston-cooling oil jets.

All versions were to come equipped with the GM 10L90 10-speed automatic transmission and Cadillac's all-wheel drive system.

In spite of its power and sophistication, high cost to produce the engine and low demand for the CT6-V led to its cancellation in early 2020, before it could be expanded to Cadillac's Escalade line.

== Production ==
When Cadillac introduced the new CT6-V in March 2018, the production was limited to 275 units for the US market. The entire allocations were sold out in minutes as soon as the pre-order book was opened in January 2019. Cadillac did not anticipate the strong demand and introduced the second CT6 model with detuned Blackwing engine: CT6 4.2 Platinum, which sold out quickly as well.

== Cancellation ==
Cadillac intended for the Blackwing V8 engine to be exclusive for its flagship sedan, CT6, and cancelled larger sedan, Escala/CT8. However, the CT6 was a poor seller during its entire model run and was cancelled in February 2020. With estimated production cost of $20,000 per engine, the Blackwing V8 would be too expensive for Escalade when somewhat over half the performance is available from GM's 3.0-liter twin turbocharged LGW High Feature V6 engine.

In March 2020, Manifattura Automobili Torino announced that they would continue production and development of the Blackwing engine, in collaboration with Punch Torino. This was however promptly denied by GM. As of January 2022, the Blackwing was still available on Cadillac's parts website, but a spokesman for GM confirmed that they were not building any more of them.

== Versions ==
Engine
Years	Model	Power	Torque
2019 & 2020	Cadillac CT6 4.2 Platinum	500 hp (373 kW) @ 5,700 rpm	574 lb⋅ft (778 N⋅m) @ 3,200-4,000 rpm
2019 & 2020	Cadillac CT6-V	550 hp (410 kW) @ 5,700 rpm	640 lb⋅ft (868 N⋅m) @ 3,200-4,000 rpm
