= Cadillac CT6 =

Full-size luxury car manufactured by Cadillac

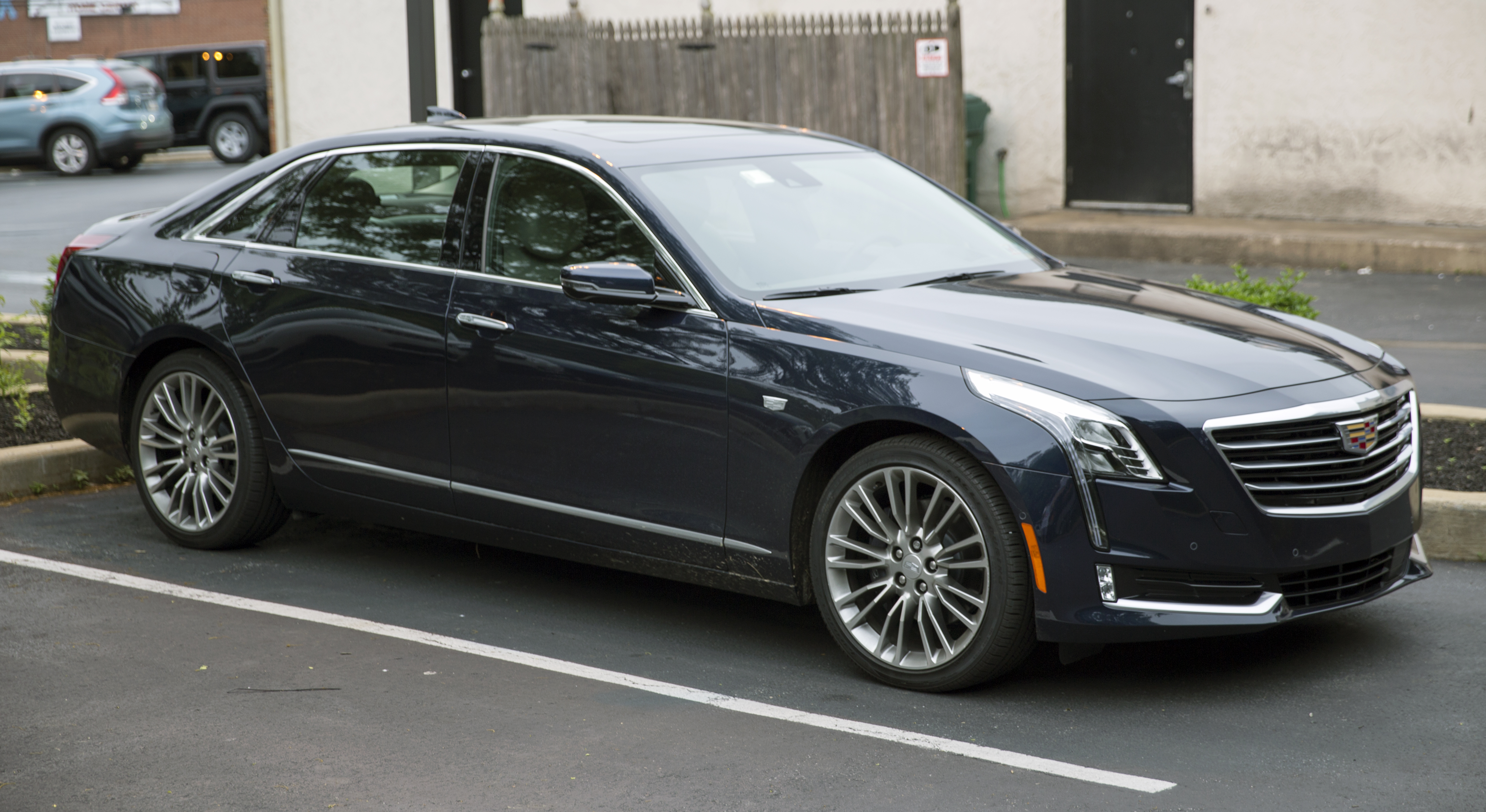

Overview
- Manufacturer: General Motors
- Production: January 2016–present
- Model years: 2016–2020 (North America); 2016–present (China)

Body and chassis
- Class: Full-size luxury car (F)
- Body style: 4-door sedan

The Cadillac CT6 (short for Cadillac Touring 6) is a full-size luxury car manufactured by Cadillac starting in 2016 over two generations.

The first generation CT6 was introduced at the 2015 New York International Auto Show and went on sale in the U.S. in March 2016. It is the first car to adopt the brand's revised naming strategy, as well as the first rear-wheel drive full-size Cadillac sedan since the Fleetwood was discontinued in 1996. In 2020, the CT6 was discontinued in the United States.

The second generation CT6 made its public debut in May 2023, and is exclusively sold in China.

== First generation (2016) ==
First generation
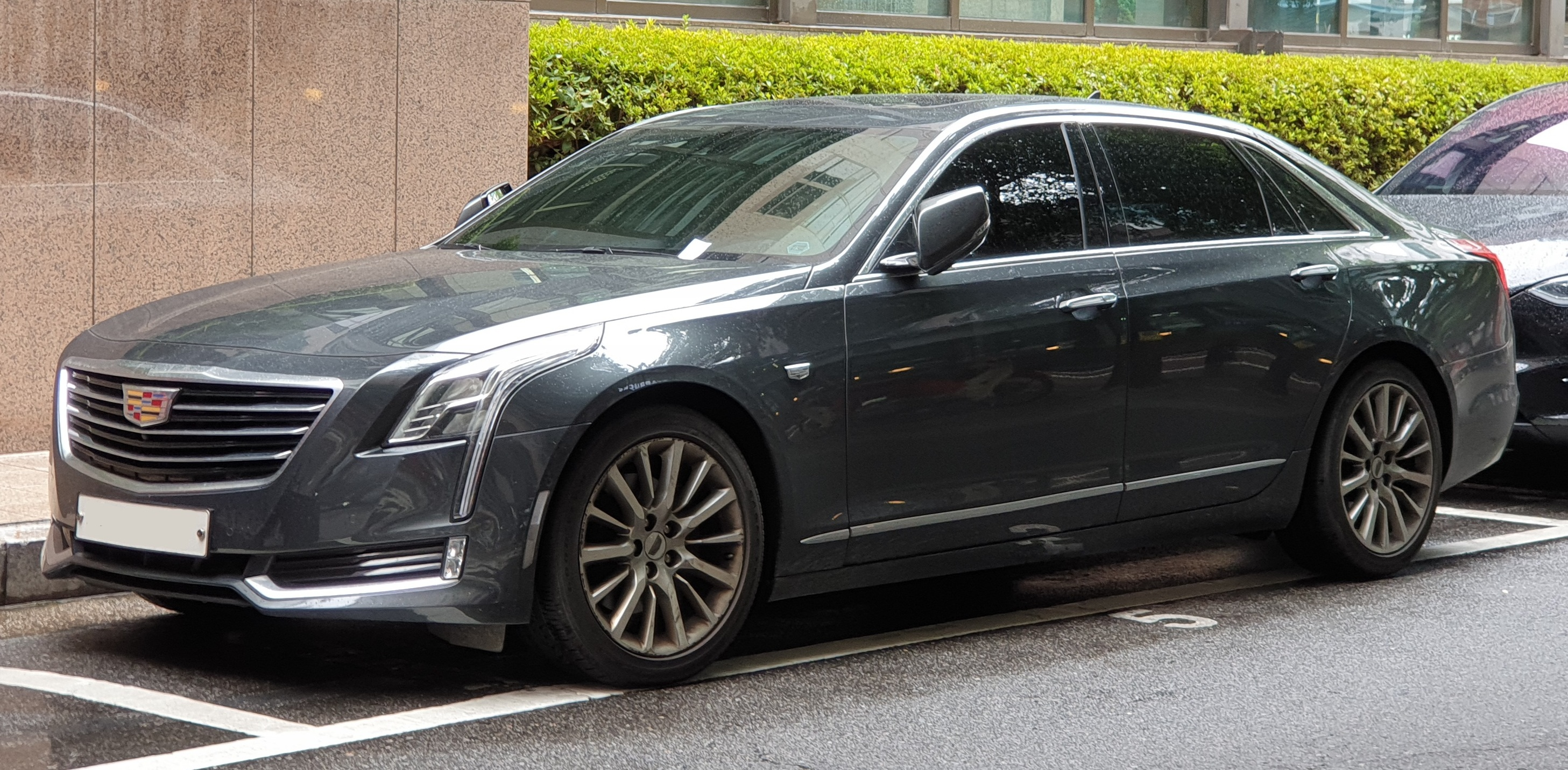
- Pre-facelift

Overview
- Model code: O1SL
- Production: January 2016 – May 2023
- Model years: 2016–2020 (North America); 2016–2023 (China)
- Assembly: United States: Detroit, Michigan (Detroit/Hamtramck Assembly); China: Jinqiao, Shanghai (SAIC-GM)

Body and chassis
- Layout: Front-engine, rear-wheel-drive Front-engine, four-wheel-drive
- Platform: GM Omega platform

Powertrain
- Engine: gasoline: 2.0 L LSY/LTG turbo I4; 3.0 L LGW twin-turbo V6; 3.6 L LGX V6; 4.2 L LTA twin-turbo V8; gasoline PHEV: 2.0 L LNF turbo I4
- Electric motor: 2x 100 hp (75 kW; 101 PS) permanent magnet motor (CT6 PHEV)
- Transmission: 8-speed Hydra-Matic 8L45 automatic; 8-speed Hydra-Matic 8L90 automatic; 10-speed Hydra-Matic 10L90 automatic; electronic CVT (CT6 PHEV)
- Hybrid drivetrain: Plug-in Hybrid (CT6 PHEV)
- Battery: 18.4 kWh

Dimensions
- Wheelbase: 122.4 in (3,109 mm)
- Length: 204.1 in (5,184 mm) (2016–2018); 205.8 in (5,227 mm) (2019–2021)
- Width: 74.0 in (1,880 mm)
- Height: 58.0 in (1,473 mm)
- Curb weight: 3,666–4,399 lb (1,663–1,995 kg)

The first-generation CT6 is built on a different platform than the smaller CTS and is engineered as a rear-wheel drive vehicle with optional all-wheel drive. In addition to its primary markets of North America and China, the CT6 was also offered in Europe, South Korea, Japan, and the Middle East.

General Motors discontinued the assembly of the Cadillac CT6 in the US in February 2020 due to poor sales and retooling of the Detroit/Hamtramck facility for electric vehicle production, beginning with the new GMC Hummer EV.

=== History ===
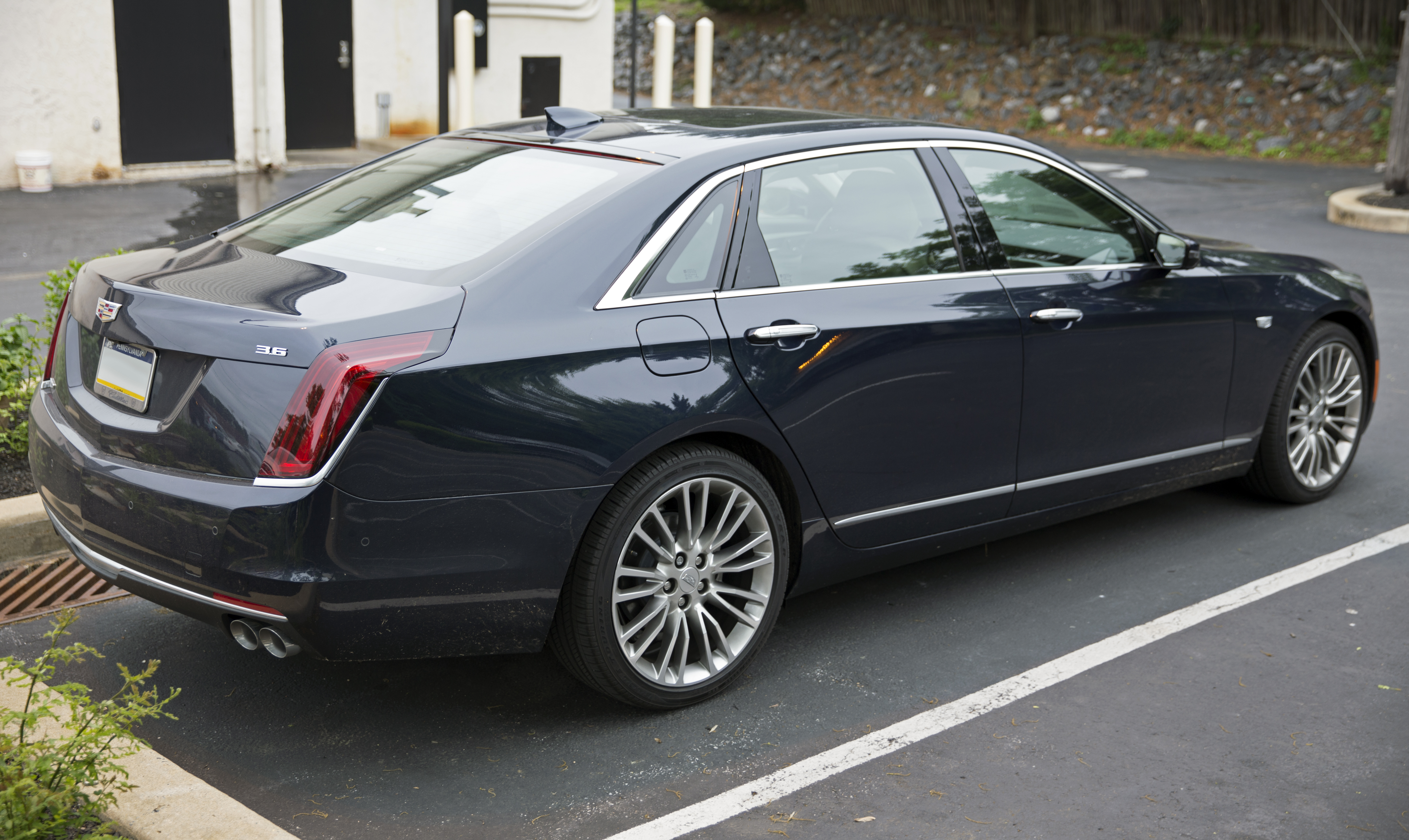
Rear view

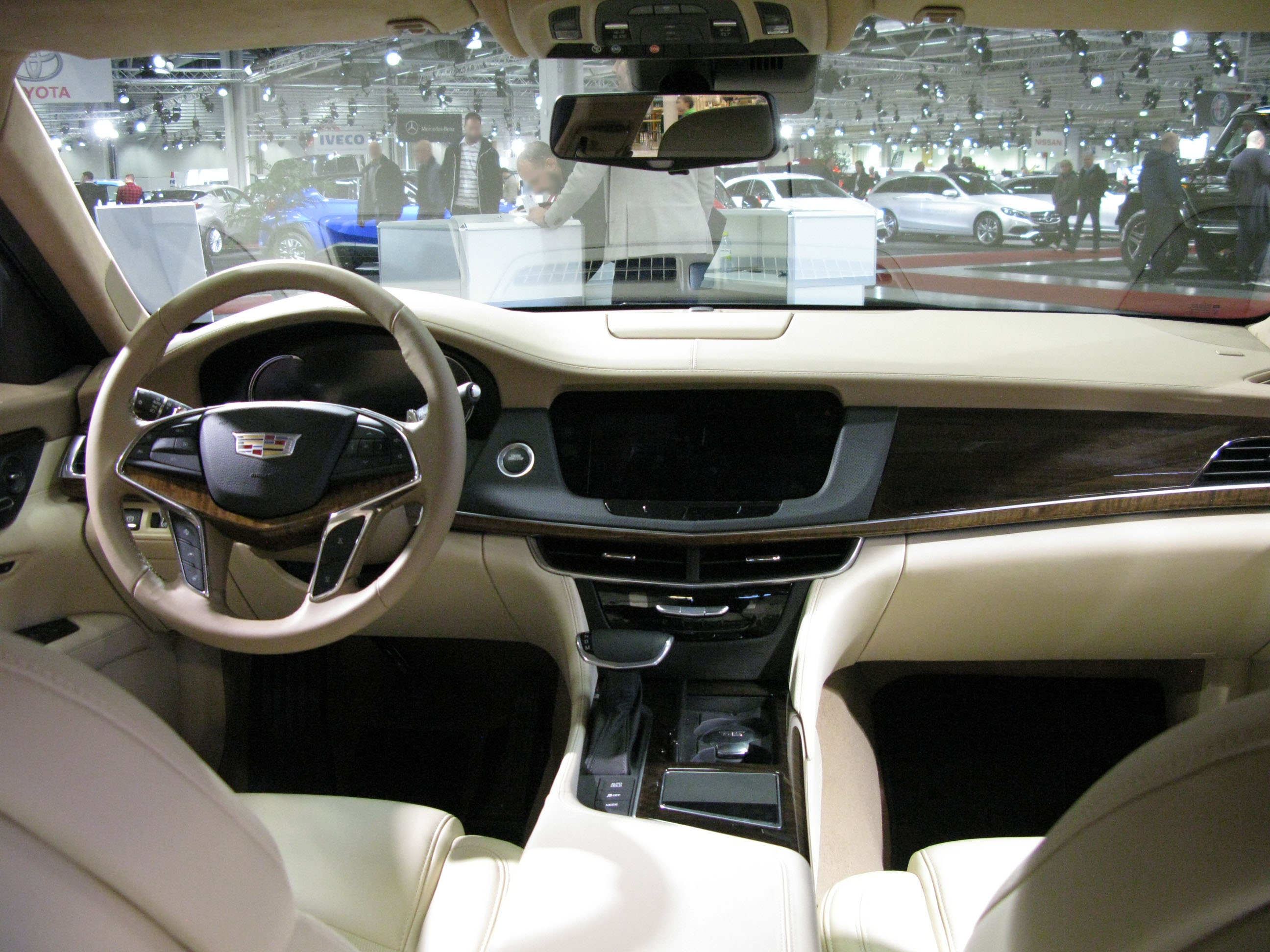
Interior

The CT6 is longer and wider than the XTS and offers more interior volume. It uses a mix of steel and aluminum, making it lighter than other cars in its size class. It was brought to market initially as an addition to, not a replacement for, the XTS, which has since been discontinued. Cadillac anticipated the CT6 would serve as a temporary flagship for the marque until a larger, more luxurious sedan would be marketed as the CT8. However, the CT8 did not come to fruition, and the CT6 remained the brand's flagship sedan.

For the American market, the CT6 was manufactured at GM's Detroit/Hamtramck Assembly plant. On March 11, 2016, the first CT6 delivery took place, having been delivered to the winner of a 2015 auction for the first CT6 sold. The vehicle sold for $200,000 at the auction. The car was "Platinum" trim level and painted Stellar Black Metallic.

The CT6 was offered in four trim levels: standard, Luxury, Premium Luxury, and Platinum. For the 2019 model year, the base (standard) trim was renamed Luxury, and a Sport trim was added, along with the CT6-V. There were nine exterior colors offered for the first year, and nine different interior packages, all featuring leather seats, with two reserved for the Platinum trim.

Standard CT6 features include the second generation CUE system, 4G LTE connectivity, and a Bose audio system: base models were equipped with an 8-speaker Bose system, which was upgraded to a Bose Centerpoint 10 speaker system included with the "Luxury" and "Premium Luxury" package, or a 34-speaker Bose Panaray audio system included with the top level "Platinum" package. Cadillac once again offers the Enhanced Night Vision which previously had been discontinued in 2004 with the DeVille. Available equipment includes Adaptive Cruise Control, as well as Magnetic Ride Control coupled with accident avoidance technologies. New with the CT6 is the Rear Camera Mirror, which uses streaming video from a camera that displays within the rear view mirror, which provides an enhanced view without obstructions from the "C-pillar" and passengers sitting in the rear area. The front seats can be adjusted 14 different ways, with an optional 16- or 20-way adjustment package that includes heated and cooled seat with a massage feature for both front and rear passengers. Another option package provides rear seat passengers with retractable 10" LCD screens that rise out from the back of the front seat seatbacks, behind the front seat headrests; these monitors can play Blu-ray content from user-supplied portable devices, and were introduced on the Cadillac Escala concept car.

2019 facelift

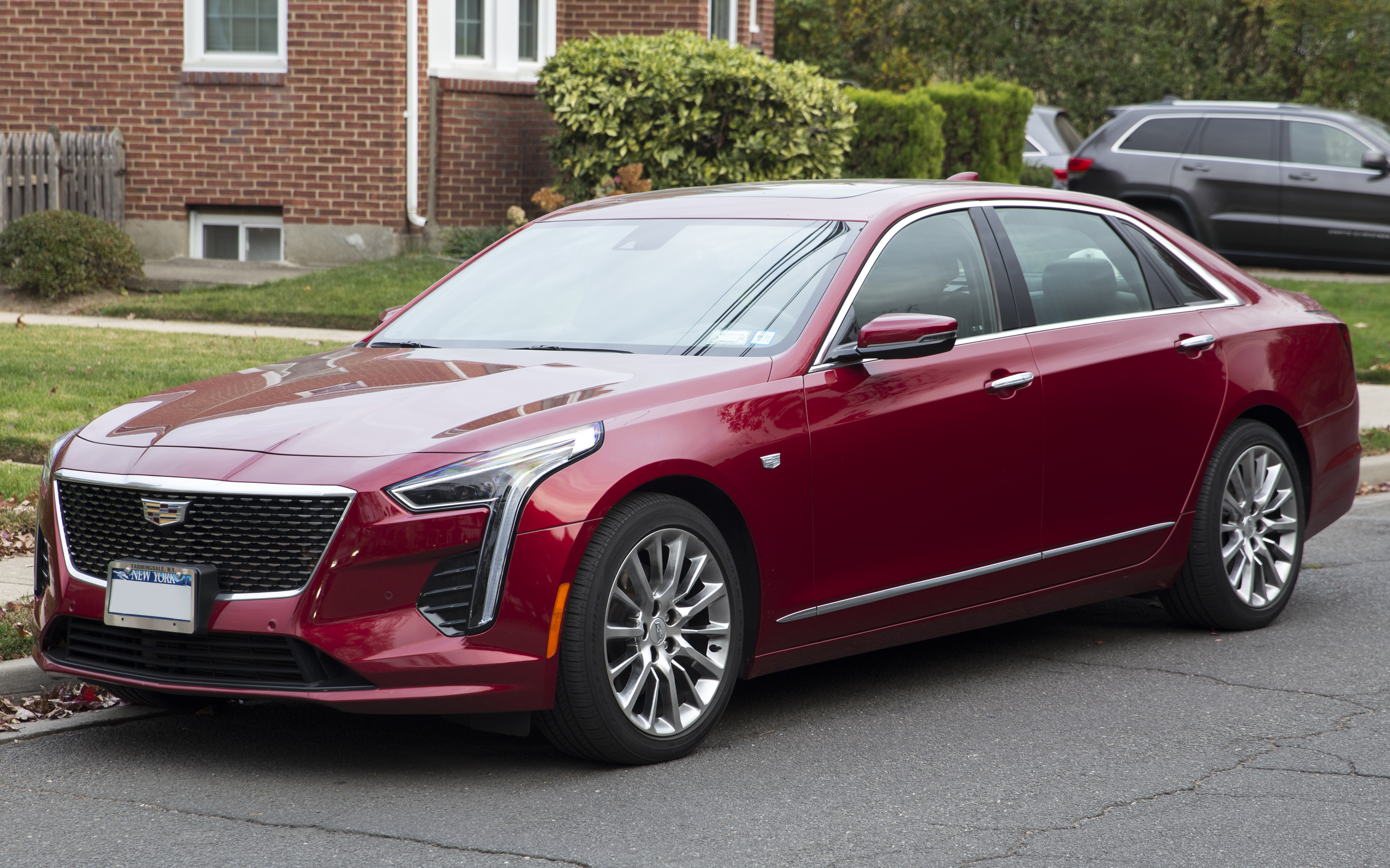
Front view

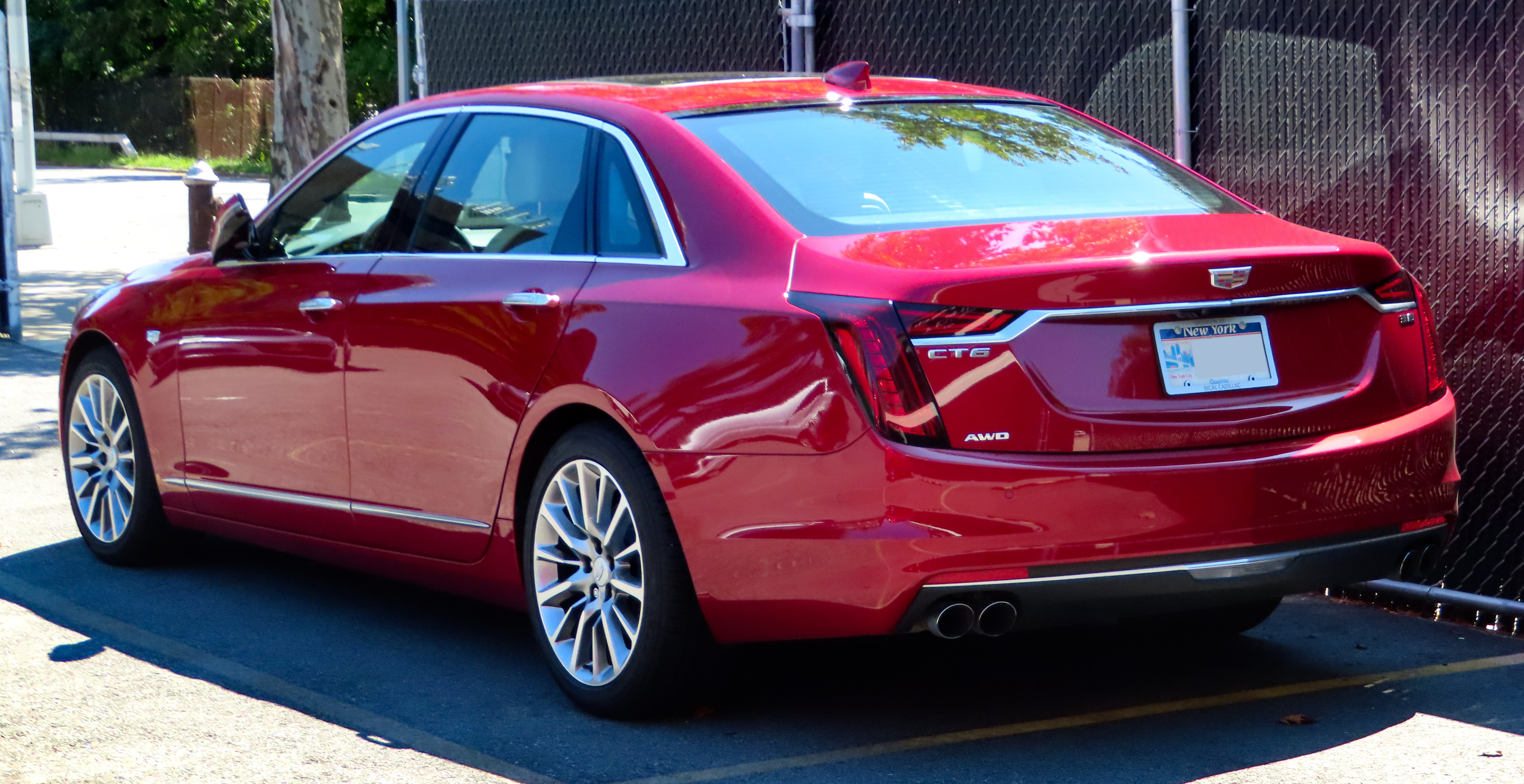
Rear view

GM's advanced driver-assistance system, branded SuperCruise, was released exclusively with the CT6 in early 2018. Initial reviews of the system were positive.

The styling was refreshed in the 2019 model year, with the most visible changes made to the front and rear lamps.

In November 2018, GM announced the Hamtramck plant would be retooled for electric vehicle assembly, and production of the CT6 in the United States was discontinued in February 2020, although the model continued to be produced and sold in China by the SAIC-GM joint venture near Shanghai.

=== Technical specifications ===
==== Powertrain ====
Cadillac CT6 powertrains
Engine Spec	2.0 L I4T	2.0 L I4T PHEV	3.6 L V6	3.0 L V6TT	4.2 L V8TT	4.2 L V8TT (CT6-V)
Model	LTG, LSY (2019)	LTG	LGX	LGW	LTA	
Badging	2.0T	2.0E	3.6	3.0T / 3.0TT	4.2TT / 800T	V
Power	265 hp (198 kW)	335 hp (250 kW) (combined output)	335 hp (250 kW)	404 hp (301 kW) at 5700	500 hp (373 kW)	550 hp (410 kW) at 5700
Torque	295 lb⋅ft (400 N⋅m)	432 lb⋅ft (586 N⋅m) (combined output)	284 lb⋅ft (385 N⋅m)	400 lb⋅ft (542 N⋅m) at 2500	553 lb⋅ft (750 N⋅m)	2019: 627 lb⋅ft (850 N⋅m) at 3200, 2020: 640 lb⋅ft (868 N⋅m) at 3400
Years	2016–2023	2017–2018	2016–2020		2019–2020	

The CT6 was initially available with a choice of three engines, a 4-cylinder 2.0-liter turbo (a first for a full-size Cadillac) and two V6 engines, a 3.6-liter and a 3.0-liter twin-turbocharged offering 404 hp (301 kW; 410 PS) and 400 lb⋅ft (542 N⋅m) together with cylinder deactivation. Four-cylinder models of the CT6 have rear-wheel drive, while six- and eight-cylinder models have all-wheel drive. The version sold in China has RWD with the four-cylinder turbo engine.

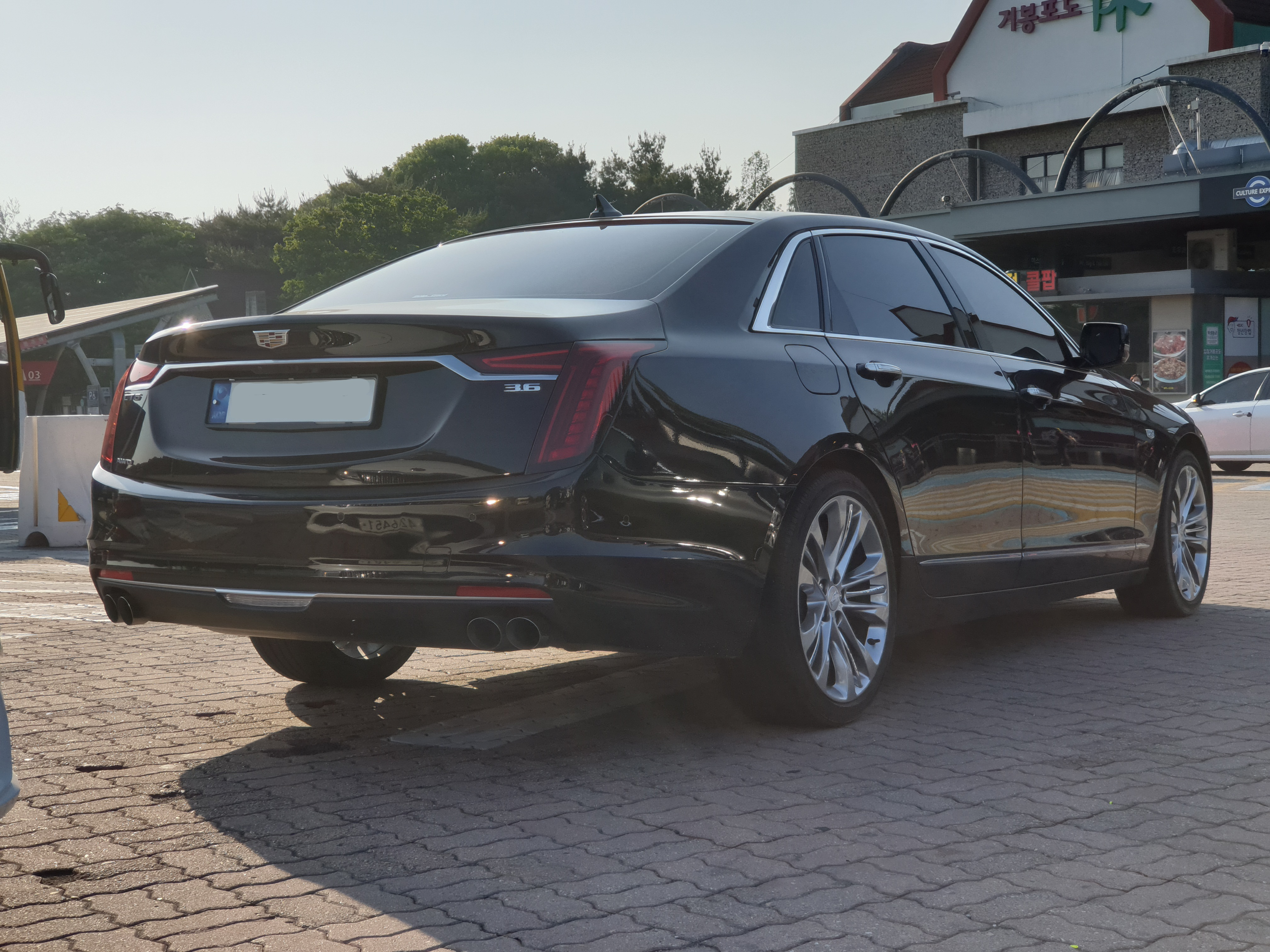
Decklid badging indicates engine type; this 2019/2020 CT6 is equipped with the 3.6 L LGX V6

A Voltec-based hybrid model was added for the 2017 model year, supplementing the 2.0 L LTG turbo-four with two electric traction motor/generators. It was discontinued after the 2018 model year.

The 4.2-liter twin-turbo 'Blackwing' V8 engine was made available for the 2019 and 2020 models making 550 hp (410 kW) for the CT6-V model and 500 hp (373 kW) for other models with the Platinum trim. Torque for both engines is 640 and 574 lb⋅ft (868 and 778 N⋅m) respectively. This is the most sophisticated V8 engine ever made by General Motors. It reportedly cost GM about $20,000 each to produce this engine. Production of the 4.2TT Blackwing models were limited with CT6-V totals of 504 (2019) and 411 (2020) while the Platinum totals were 168 (2019) and 117 (2020). Badging for the 2019 and 2020 CT6-V is the stylized Cadillac "V" on the trunk while the Platinum trunk badging is 4.2TT for 2019 models and 800T for 2020 models.

==== Technology ====
The CT6 line comes with one of three audio systems designed by Bose Corporation: an 8-speaker Bose Premium Sound System, a 10-speaker Bose Centerpoint Surround-Sound System, or the top-of-the-line 34-speaker Bose Panaray Surround-Sound System, which processes stereo audio into Surround Sound using Bose's automotive sound system technologies, as well as technologies from its Panaray line of professional speakers; typical Dolby or DTS surround modes are not available. The Panaray name is a portmanteau of "panoramic" and "array"; the system consists of 34 speakers mounted in 19 separate locations in the car, including ones mounted in the front seat headrests, as well as a motorized center-channel speaker that rises from the center of the instrument panel. During the development process, one of the prototypes presented by Bose called for 49 speakers. Most of the drivers are less than 4 in (100 mm) in diameter; there are four amplifiers, with a combined output of 570 watts. In a review, Car and Driver called it "powerful and sure to dazzle neophytes" but added it was "lacking in detail and separation compared with the best in-car audio".

The CT6 uses a digital display embedded in the interior rear-view mirror showing output from the rear-view camera, which allows the driver to easily see what is behind them. This is the first vehicle to offer a rear-view camera display over the entire rear-view mirror surface. It has a resolution of 1280 × 240, and was developed in partnership with Gentex Corporation.

Starting in 2017, GM Super Cruise became available for semi-autonomous highway driving. It is part of a US$5,000 option package on CT6's Premium Luxury model and is standard on the top-of-the-line Platinum. Super Cruise sensors include an array of exterior cameras to detect lane markings and provide a 360-degree view of the vehicle's surroundings, a high-accuracy global positioning system receiver, and a driver-facing camera with infrared emitters to monitor driver engagement. The system was designed to operate in a geofenced area, which initially consisted of 160,000 mi (260,000 km) of limited-access roads that Ushr, Inc. had mapped for GM with LIDAR.

To engage Super Cruise, the driver must first engage the Adaptive Cruise Control system in the CT6. Once the system has satisfied the prerequisites (visible lane markings, driver paying sufficient attention, driving on a limited-access freeway, no system faults), a white steering wheel icon will illuminate in the upper right corner of the speedometer display to alert the driver that Super Cruise is available. If the Teen Driver mode is active or Forward Automatic Braking is off, Super Cruise is not available. Engaging the Super Cruise button will turn that icon green, indicating that Super Cruise is active. In addition, the "steering wheel light bar" on the upper rim of the steering wheel will illuminate in green. If the light bar and speedometer indicator is blue, that indicates the system has detected manual steering. These also are used to alert the driver when the system decides the driver is not paying attention: first flashing the light bar in green as a first warning, then progressing to flashing red and changing the dashboard indicator to red for the second and third warnings when the driver needs to take control immediately.

=== Models ===
==== CT6 PHEV ====
A plug-in hybrid variant, the CT6 PHEV, debuted at the 2015 Shanghai Auto Show. The plug-in hybrid uses a variant of the GM Voltec powertrain derived from the Chevrolet Volt (second generation). In the CT6 PHEV, the powertrain combines a 266 hp (198 kW; 270 PS), 2.0L turbocharged 4-cylinder direct injected gasoline engine with an electric continuously-variable transmission incorporating a dual electric motor hybrid design, and a liquid cooled 18.4 kWh lithium-ion battery pack, which is integrated into a space behind the rear seat, reducing the trunk cargo volume from 15.3 to 10.6 ft^{3} (430 to 300 L). Total combined power is 250 kW (335 hp; 340 PS) and torque is 432 lb⋅ft (586 N⋅m).

The CT6 PHEV is the first Cadillac product for the U.S. market to have its final assembly point in China. One of the motors (M/G B) is assembled at Baltimore Transmission, while the battery pack is assembled in Brownstown, Michigan using cells manufactured by LG Chem in Holland, Michigan; the powertrain is shipped from the United States to Jinqiao, China, where final assembly is performed by SAIC-GM.

It was released in the Chinese market in December 2016. Pricing in China started at CN¥558,800 (~US$80,408), with a higher trim at CN¥658,800 (~ US$94,683) before any applicable government incentives. The CT6 PHEV went on sale in the U.S. in March 2017 with equipment similar to the Premium Luxury trim level, including the upgraded 12-inch digital gauge display, head-up display, rear camera display embedded in the rear view mirror, and moonroof; relatively few options were available. The base price was US$76,090 (equivalent to $99,900 in 2025) including destination charges, before applicable government incentives. For 2017, Cadillac offered the CT6 PHEV in a choice of five exterior colors, one of which ("Deep Amethyst Metallic") was exclusive to the PHEV, and one of up to three interior colors, depending on the exterior color choice. One more exterior color ("Cocoa Bronze Metallic") was added for the 2018 model year.

The CT6 PHEV has an EPA fuel economy rating of 62 MPGe (54 kWh per 100 miles) combined while running on full electric power, or 25 MPG combined in hybrid mode. The EPA-certified electric range is 31 miles (50 km), while the total range of both the gasoline engine and hybrid electric motor combined is over 440 miles (710 km). While driving at a steady 75 mph (121 km/h), Car and Driver observed fuel economy of 69 mpg‑e (30 kWh/100 km) in EV mode and 31 mpg_{‑US} (7.6 L/100 km; 37 mpg_{‑imp}) in hybrid, with corresponding ranges of 33 and 480 mi (53 and 772 km), respectively. According to Cadillac, estimated charging times range from 4.5 hours (using 240 VAC at 16 A) to 20 hours (using a standard household outlet, 120 VAC at 8 A).

==== CT6-V ====
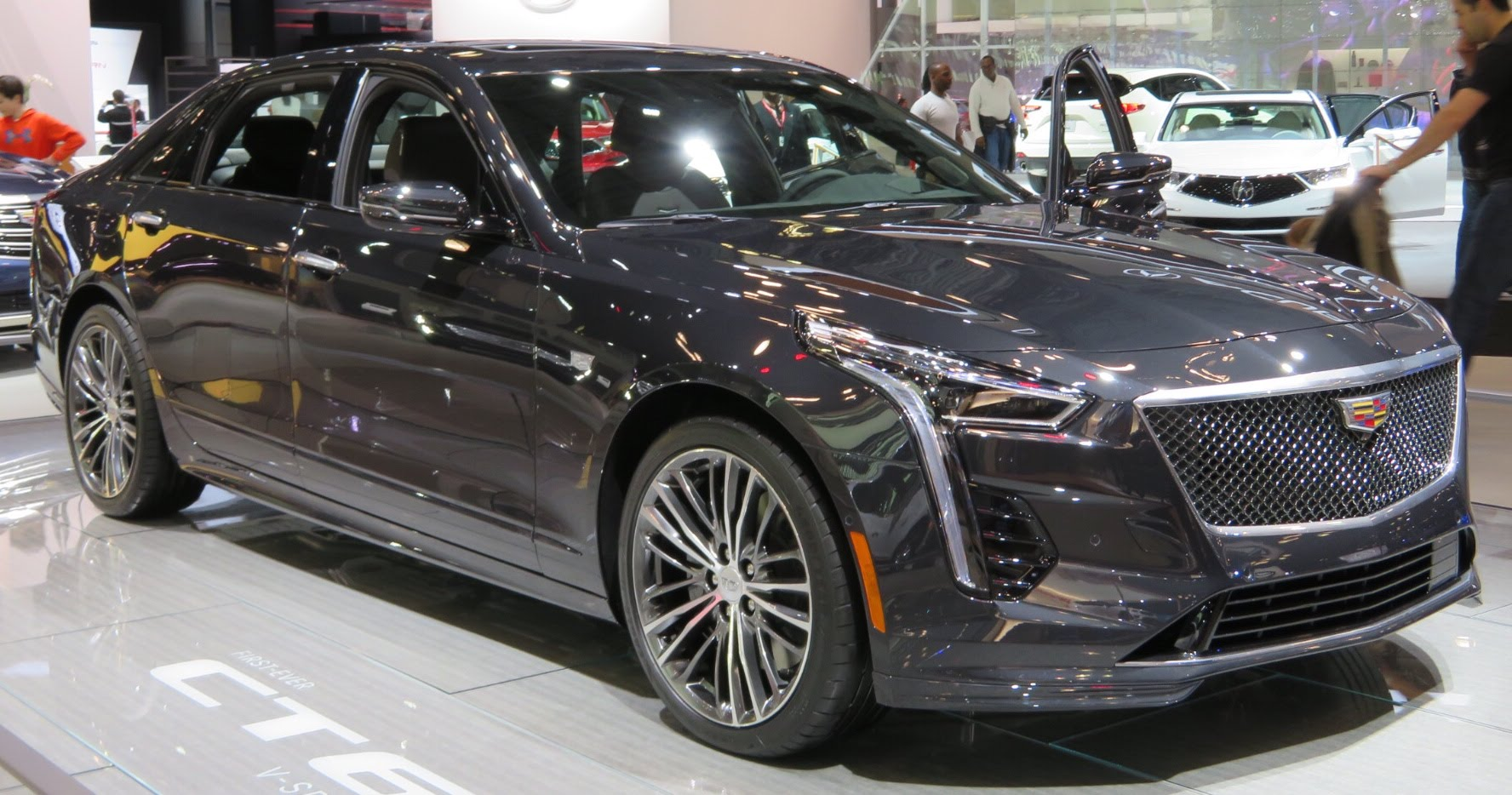
Cadillac CT6-V front

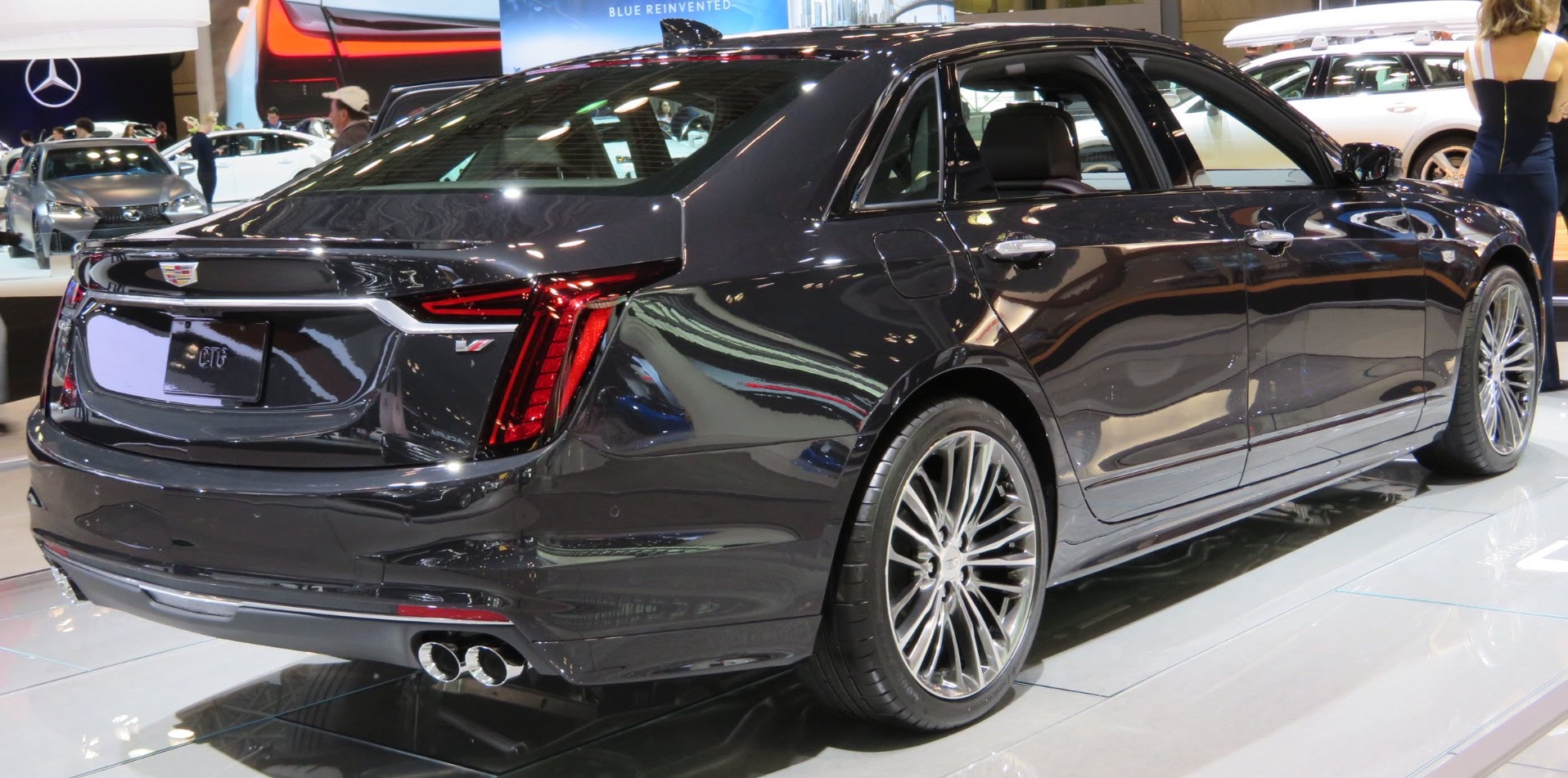
Cadillac CT6-V rear

Introduced as a high-performance version of the CT6, the CT6-V (formerly known as the V-Sport) was first revealed at the 2018 New York Auto Show. Powertrain improvements over the regular CT6 include a newly developed DOHC twin-turbocharged, hot vee V8, code-named Blackwing, which produces 550 hp (410 kW; 558 PS) at 5,700 rpm and 640 lb⋅ft (868 N⋅m) of torque between 3,200 rpm and 4,000 rpm. This engine has an 86.0 mm (3.39 in) bore and 90.2 mm (3.55 in) stroke with a compression ratio of 9.8:1. In order to withstand the stress of a high-performance engine and reduce internal friction, Cadillac has used forged steel connecting rods and a special coating for piston pins. To improve efficiency, Cadillac employed cylinder deactivation on cylinders 2, 3, 5, and 8 while variable timing was used on all four camshafts (which can adjust 55 degrees on the exhaust and 70 degrees on the intake). When the engine is off, the intake cams are parked in the middle of their travel, preventing exhaust/intake valve overlap to allow for easier starting and smoother initial idle. Fuel is injected directly into the cylinder at over 5,000 psi (34,000 kPa) of pressure. Cast stainless steel exhaust manifolds incorporate the housing within the engine bank for the twin-scroll Mitsubishi Heavy Industries turbochargers, mounted between cylinder banks in a hot vee configuration, to allow for better response. Titanium aluminide turbine wheels spin up to 190,000 rpm, producing peak boost of 20 psi (140 kPa) which is relieved by electric wastegates. The intercooler is mounted just above each cylinder head, which reduces the charge air temperature by approximately 130 °F (54 °C) before reaching the engine intake.

The engines were hand-assembled and personally signed at the Bowling Green plant in Kentucky where each Chevrolet Corvette is also assembled. The engines are mated to a 10-speed automatic transmission, which uses Performance Algorithm Shift programming to achieve the ideal shifting patterns. The CT6-V also features an AWD system with optimized transfer case, rear steering, and mechanical Limited Slip Differential (LSD). The AWD system will adjust according to the three different driving modes available. The standard torque bias remains 40:60 front to rear, but will adjust to a torque split of 10:90 for optimized track performance with minimum understeer. Furthermore, the front end and rear end are redesigned; the front features a new hood, headlamps, and grille while the rear features a new deck lid and tail lamps. The chassis is recalibrated with specific stabilizer bars, springs, and Magnetic Ride dampers.

== Second generation (2023) ==
Second generation
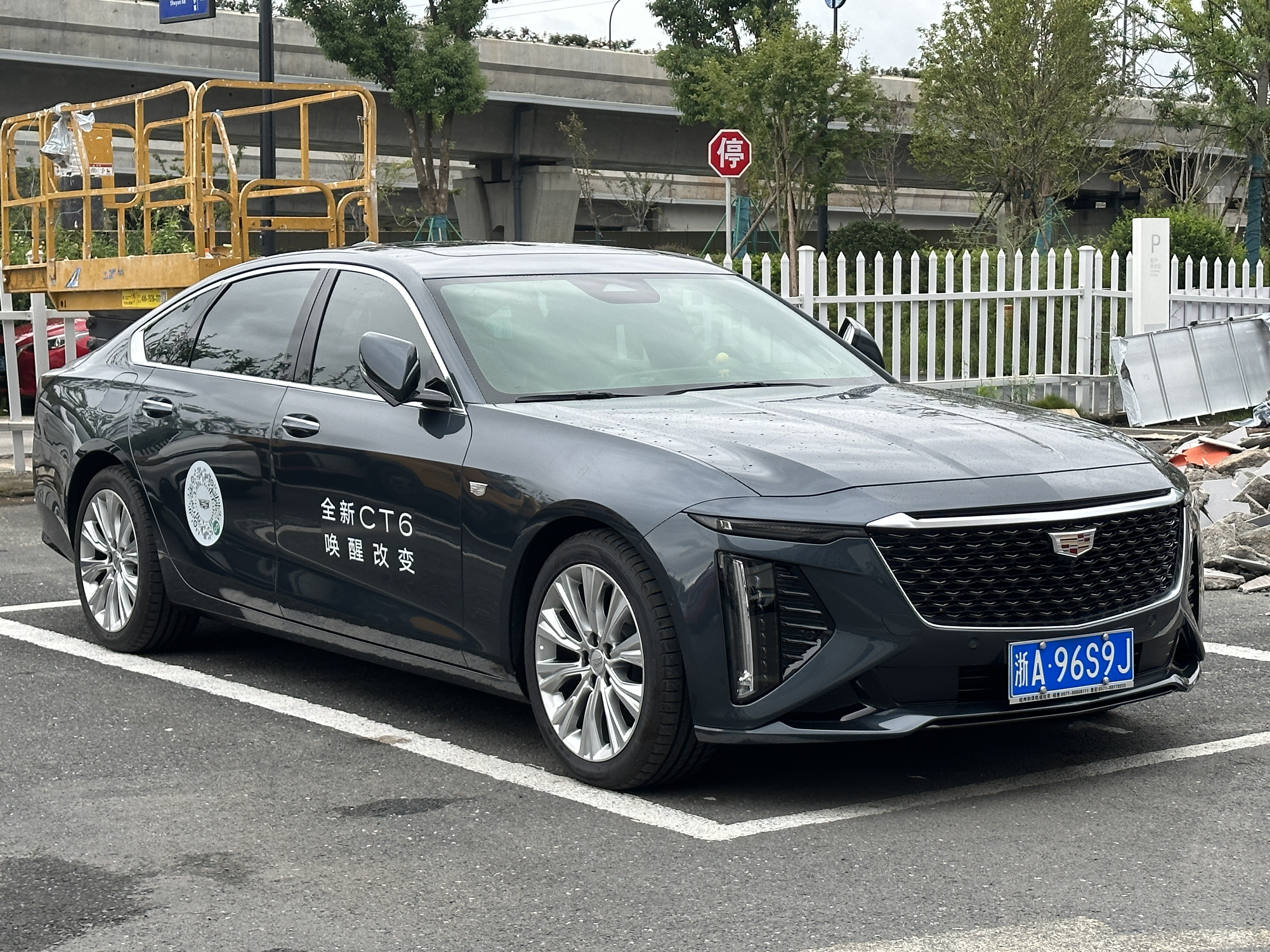

Overview
- Model code: O1SL-2
- Production: May 2023 – present
- Assembly: China: Jinqiao, Shanghai (SAIC-GM)

Body and chassis
- Layout: Front-engine, rear-wheel-drive
- Platform: GM VSS-R (O1XX)

Powertrain
- Engine: 2.0 L LSY turbo I4
- Power output: 237 hp (177 kW; 240 PS)
- Transmission: 10-speed automatic

Dimensions
- Wheelbase: 3,109 mm (122 in)
- Length: 5,223 mm (205.6 in)
- Width: 1,890 mm (74.4 in)
- Height: 1,473 mm (58.0 in)

Photographs and details of an updated second-generation CT6 were leaked in November 2022; it has similar dimensions and the same wheelbase as the first-generation CT6. The second generation CT6 made its public debut on May 28, 2023, and is now exclusively sold in China, and went on sale at the end of Q2 2023.

Despite being a new generation, the second iteration of the CT6 takes design cues from the previous model. With a new interior, adding new technology, it is an improvement in technology, and has been modernized significantly.

The second-generation CT6 carries over multiple compartments from the previous generation such as, gearbox, size, design cues and platform.

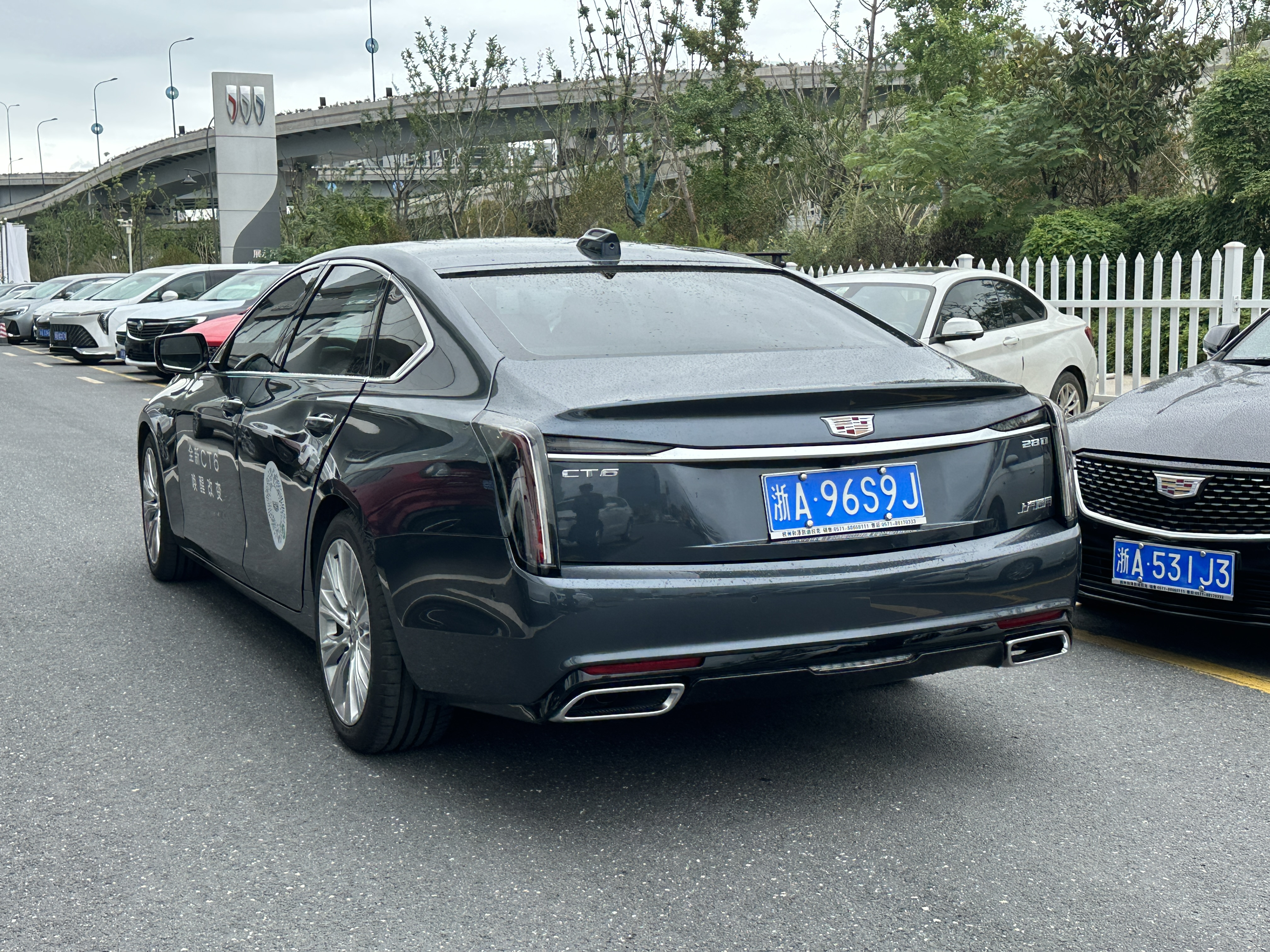
Rear view

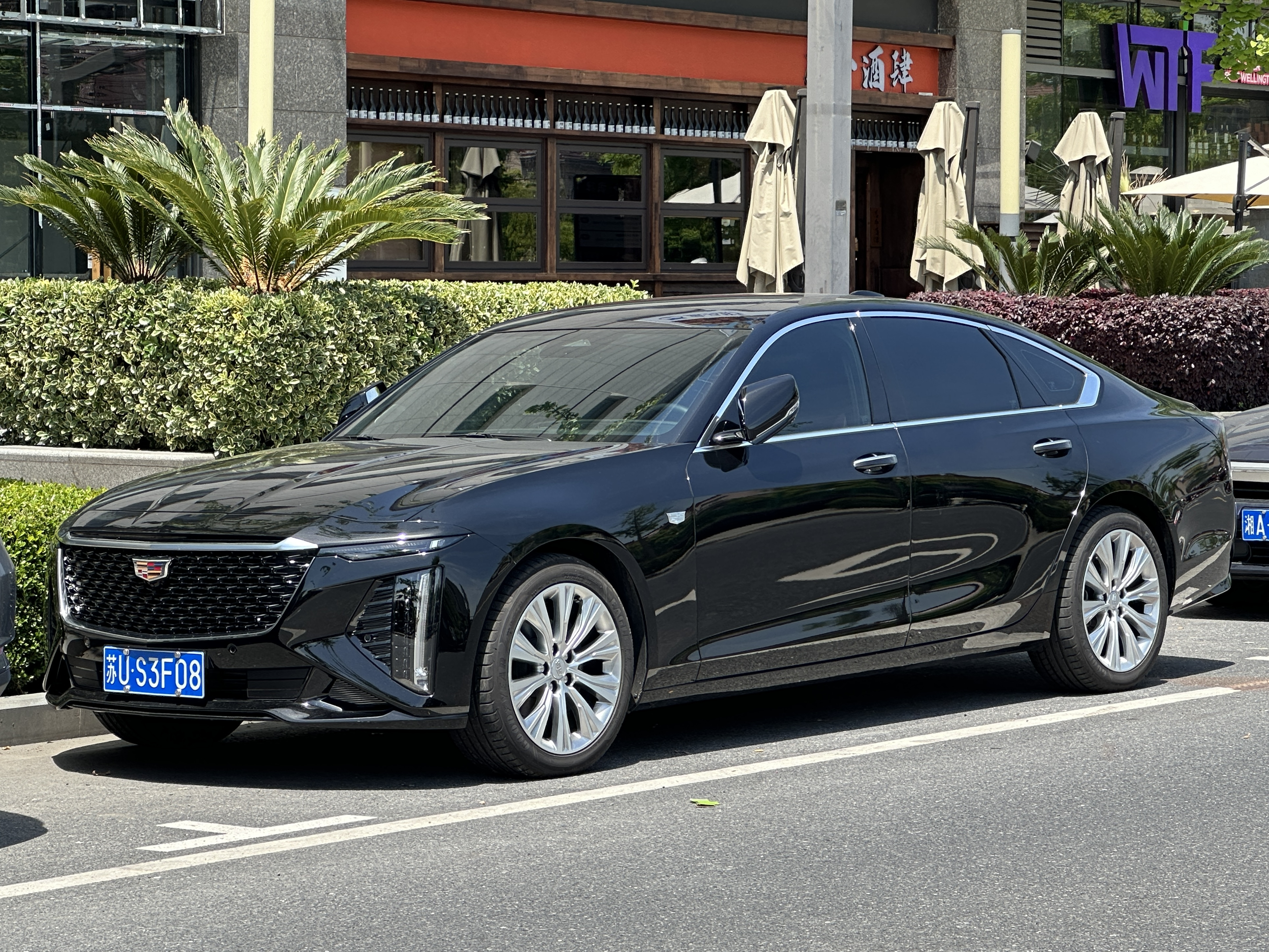
Side view

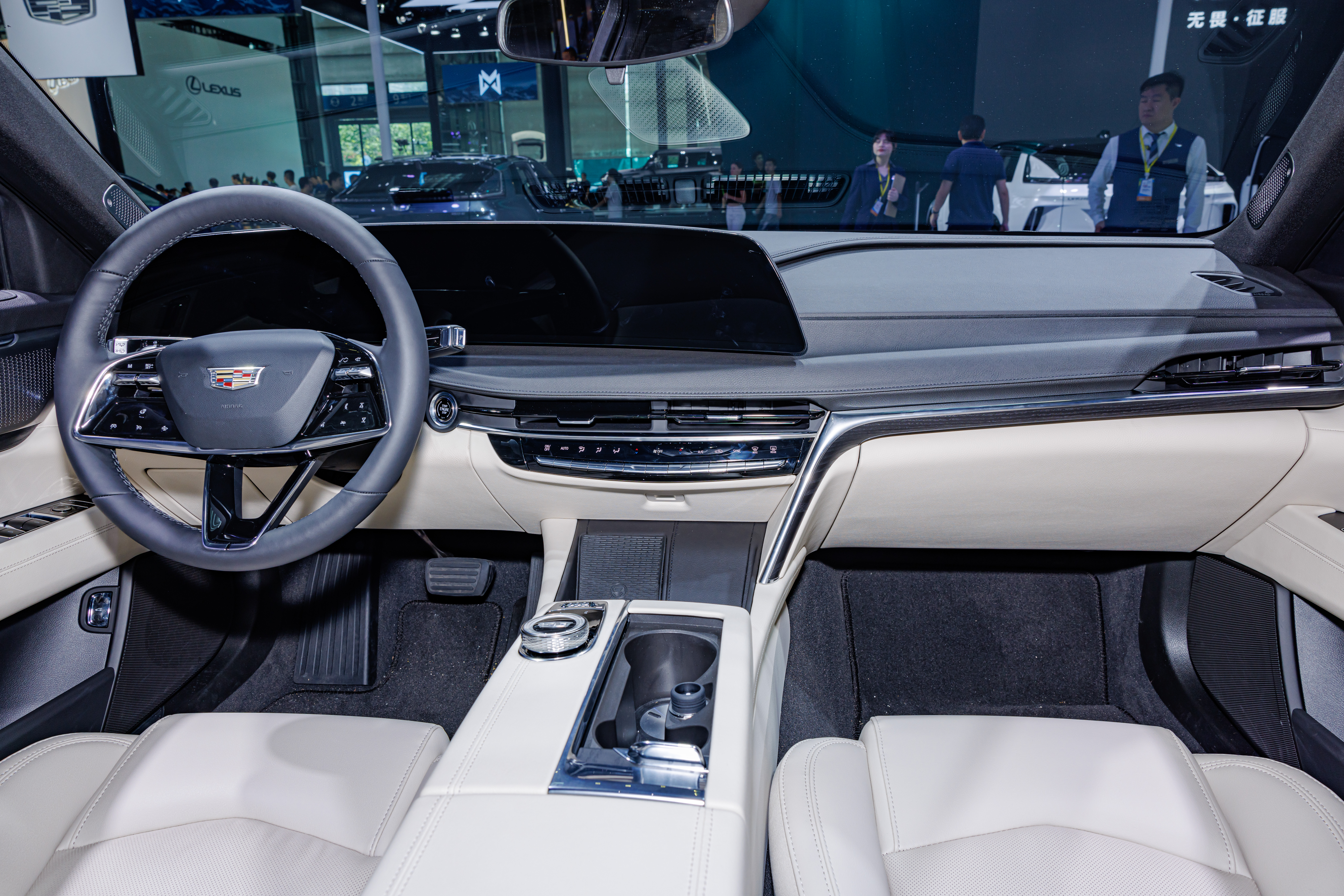
Interior

=== Powertrain ===
Internal combustion engines
Spec Model	Engine	Power	Torque	Displacement	Top speed	Transmission	Acceleration (0-60/100)	Drive	Production
28T	2.0 L LSY I4 turbo	237 hp (177 kW; 240 PS) @ 5000	350 N⋅m (258 lb⋅ft) @ 1500-4000	1,998 cc (2.0 L; 121.9 cu in)	230 km/h (143 mph)	10-speed automatic transmission	7.5 sec	RWD	2023–

=== Equipment ===
With the technology upgrade, the CT6 receives a 33-inch infotainment screen along with Super Cruise, Magnetic Ride Control 4.0, and a digital rear view mirror.

== Reception ==
The car was chosen as one of the Top 10 Tech Cars by the IEEE in 2018.

== Sales ==
Calendar year	United States	China
2016	9,169	5,830
2017	10,542	11,917
2018	9,668	17,223
2019	7,951	22,637
2020	3,117	21,689
2021	—	17,715
2022	—	11,763
2023	—	9,674
2024	—	5,333
2025	—	2,134

== See also ==
- Electric car use by country
- List of modern production plug-in electric vehicles
- Plug-in electric vehicle
