= Valvetronic =

Automotive engine technology

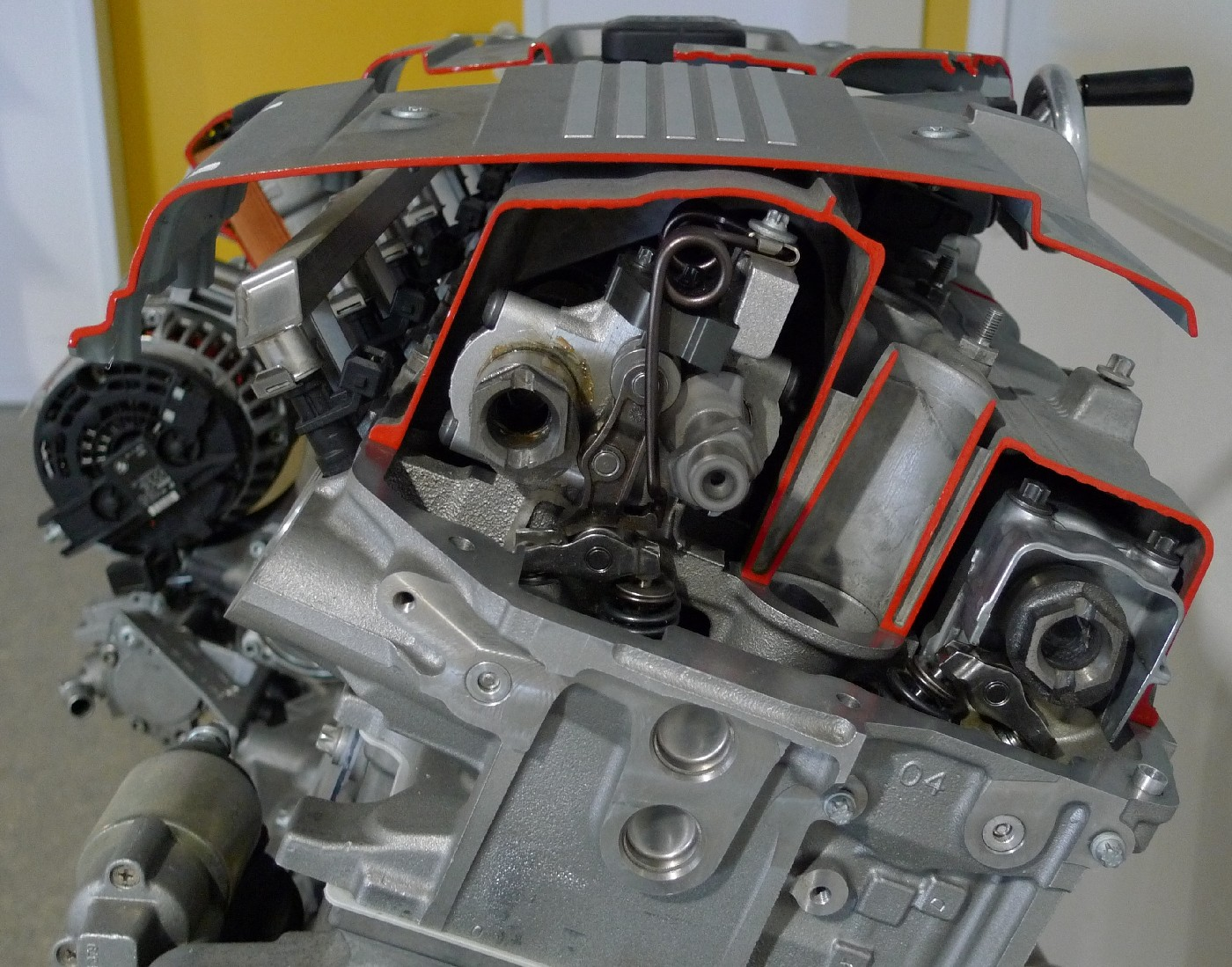
Valvetronic system of the BMW N52 engine

The Valvetronic system is a BMW variable valve lift system which, in combination with VANOS, allows infinite adjustment of both intake valve timing and lift. The system claims to improve fuel economy and emissions, and negates the need for a throttle body in regular use.

First introduced by BMW on the 316ti compact in 2001, Valvetronic has since been added to many of BMW's engines.

== Details ==
Unlike a traditional engine where the camshaft acts onto a rocker arm that actuates the valves, an engine with Valvetronic has an intermediate arm between the rocker and the camshaft, which allows the valve lift to be varied depending on the position of an eccentric shaft adjacent to the intermediate arm. The eccentric shaft, whose position is controlled by the DME using an electric motor, rotates through a range of 225 degrees to push the intermediate arm towards, or away from, the camshaft. For lesser lift, the eccentric shaft moves the intermediate arm away from the camshaft, so that lesser of the camshaft profile is pressing on the intermediate arm. For more lift, the intermediate arm is moved closer to the camshaft, which increases the camshaft profile acting on the intermediate arm.

First-generation Valvetronic systems can decrease the valve lift to a minimum of 0.3 mm, while second- and third-generation Valvetronic can decrease the lift to as little as 0.18 mm.

On first-generation Valvetronic, the contact point on the intermediate arm for the camshaft was a contact pad; later systems use a roller which is less prone to wear.

== See also ==
- VANOS – BMW's variable valve timing
- Prince engine
