= Hot vee turbocharged engine =

Type of internal combustion engine

Hot Vee Turbocharged Engine

Overview
- Manufacturer: Ferrari; BMW; Mercedes-AMG; Porsche; Cadillac
- Production: 1981–present

Layout
- Configuration: V engine

Combustion
- Turbocharger: Yes
- Fuel type: Petrol

A hot vee turbocharged engine (or hot V) is a V engine with one or more turbochargers in the "V" between the cylinder banks. This reverses the gas flow in the traditional layout for V engines where there is a single intake manifold in the center of the V (the "cold side"). The hot vee offers a shorter air path from the turbocharger, through an intercooler, and back into the engine intake, which can reduce turbo lag.

== Applications ==
Ferrari 126C F1 car used a hot vee in 1981. BMW N63 was the first production motor using the hot vee, used in the US-made BMW X6 since 2008. Since then others have been introduced including the Ford 6.7 liter "Scorpion" (2012), the Mercedes-AMG GT (2014), the Porsche Cayenne Turbo (2018), and Cadillac's twin-turbocharged 4.2 liter V8 in the 2019 CT6-V.
