= Stuart Hilborn =

Canadian automotive engineer

Stuart Garfield Hilborn (9 October 1917 – 16 December 2013), was born in Calgary, Canada. Hilborn was an automotive engineer. He became interested in amateur racing on dry lake beds before World War II. After the war, he began experimenting with ideas for mechanical fuel injection, and tested them on his own race cars. Only a few years later, his injectors were adopted by professional racers with notable success, including the first to break the 150-mile-per-hour mark. Starting in 1949, Hilborn-equipped cars claimed dozens of victories at the Indianapolis circuit.

Hilborn eventually started a company to sell his injection systems to the public, which became popular with the hot rodders of the 1950s and 1960s. A classic mechanical Hilborn injection system is recognizable by its distinctive flared velocity stack intake pipes, rising straight up from each cylinder, flared at the open top, and usually polished or plated for a bright, shiny finish. Hilborn died in Aliso Viejo, California on December 16, 2013. The Hilborn company was purchased by Holley in 2019. Citing a shrinking market for mechanical fuel injection systems and parts, Holley announced in February of 2024 that they would cease production of Hilborn components.

Hilborn was inducted into the Specialty Equipment Market Association (SEMA) Hall of Fame, as well as the HOT ROD Magazine Speed Parts Hall of Fame for the first Mechanical Hydrogen Fuel Injection.
