= Variator (variable valve timing) =

Variable valve timing (VVT) is a system for varying the valve opening of an internal combustion engine. This allows the engine to deliver high power, but also to work tractably and efficiently at low power. There are many systems for VVT, which involve changing either the relative timing, duration or opening of the engine's inlet and exhaust valves.

One of the first practical VVT systems used a variator to change the phase (Note: Phase refers to the relative timing between the inlet and exhaust camshafts, expressed as an angular measure.) of the camshaft and valves. This simple system cannot change the duration of the valve opening, or their lift. (Note: 'Lift' is the distance by which the valves open.) Later VVT systems, such as the helical camshaft or the movable fulcrum systems, could change these factors too. Despite this limitation, the variator is a relatively simple device to add to an existing engine and so they remain in service today.

As the benefit of the variator relies on changing the relative timing between inlet and exhaust, variator systems are only applied to double overhead camshaft engines. A variator system that moved a single camshaft for both inlet and exhaust would be possible, but would have no performance benefit.

== Alfa Romeo system ==
Alfa Romeo was the first manufacturer to use a variable valve timing system in production cars (US Patent 4,231,330). The 1980 Alfa Romeo Spider 2.0 L had a mechanical VVT system in SPICA fuel injected cars sold in the US. Later this was also used in the 1983 Alfetta 2.0 Quadrifoglio Oro models as well as other cars. The technique derives from work carried in the 1970s by Alfa Romeo engineer Giampaolo Garcea and in Italian the device is termed variatore di fase. The Alfa Romeo Twin Spark engine, introduced in the 1987 Alfa Romeo 75, also uses variable valve timing.

The Alfa system varies the phase (not the duration) of the cam timing and operates on the inlet camshaft.

Alfa Romeo's variator is a cylindrical chamber that contains a pressure chamber and piston along with helical splines. Engine oil pressure, moves the internal piston which rotates slightly due to the helical splines and advances the inlet valve timing by 25 degrees. Oil flow to the variator is controlled by a solenoid valve. When engine speed reaches a certain speed, normally 1500-2000 rpm in the Twin Spark application, the solenoid energises, causing pressurised oil to be directed through the inlet camshaft into the variator. The inlet camshaft position is advanced 25 degrees, thus increasing valve overlap. It remains in this advanced state until about 5000 rpm when the solenoid switches off, and the variator piston returns the valve timing to its natural state. The variable timing increases the engine's mid-range flexibility and reduces emissions. Exact changeover points depend on version. It is notable that this relatively early system only has two settings: unchanged and fully advanced.

=== Applications ===
- 1980 Alfa Romeo Spider
- 1987 Alfa Romeo 75 Twin Spark
- 1991 Alfa Romeo 155 1.8 L and 2.0 L petrol engines
- 1997 Alfa Romeo 156 with the 1.6 L, 1.8 L and 2.0 L petrol engines
- 1998 Alfa Romeo GTV and Spider with the 1.8 L and 2.0 L petrol engines
- 2000 Alfa Romeo 147 with the 1.6 L and 2.0 L petrol engines, except for the model with the 105 bhp engine
- 2004 Alfa Romeo GT with the 1.8 L and 2.0 L petrol engines
- 2001 Fiat Stilo with the 1.8 L or 2.4 L engines

== Volkswagen system ==
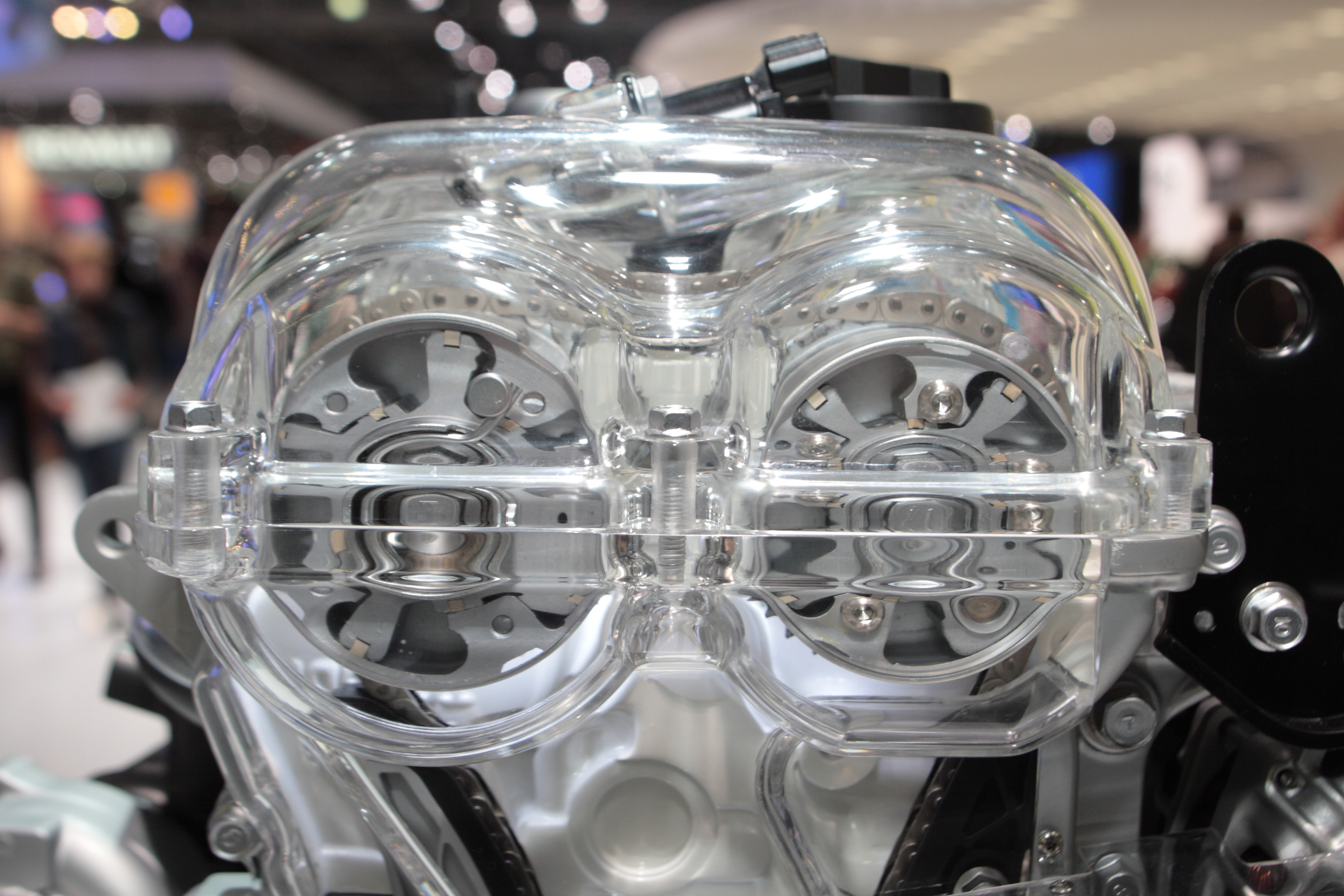
'Fluted variators' on a transparent model of a Hyundai T-GDI engine

Volkswagen use a variator system with two variators, one for each camshaft. Like the Alfa Romeo system, these are electrically-controlled hydraulic units, mounted in the camshaft's timing belt pulley. These systems are fitted to the Volkswagen VR5 and VR6 engines, and also to the W8 and W12 engines. The multiple-bank W engines have four variators in total, one for each camshaft.

The Volkswagen variator is referred to as a 'fluted variator', owing to the shape of the hydraulic components. Unlike the Alfa Romeo system with its helical splines and indirect actuation, (Note: Hydraulic action in the Alfa Romeo is axial, using helical splines to then cause a rotation of the variator.) the Volkswagen system has a direct rotational action. The internal components of the variator resemble a paddle wheel inside a loose casing, so that it is free to move a few degrees from side to side. By applying hydraulic pressure on one side of these paddles, a phase shift is achieved. The hydraulic fluid is engine oil, controlled by a solenoid valve mounted on the cylinder head and controlled by the ECU. A Hall effect sensor also monitors the camshaft position.

== Other variator-based VVT systems ==
- Variable Cam Timing, Ford
- VANOS, BMW
