= Velocity stack =

Engine fuel system device

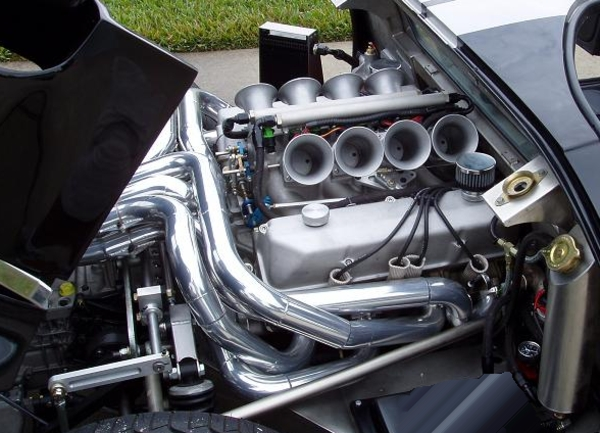
Short velocity stacks on a Ford FE engine in a Ford GT40

A velocity stack, trumpet, or air horn is a flared tubular device fitted individually or in groupings to the entry of an internal combustion engine's intake to improve high-speed airflow and other flow characteristics, thus improving performance. Velocity stacks can be of differing lengths and fitted to both carbureted and fuel injected engines.

== Overview ==
A velocity stack is designed to:

- Allow smooth and even entry of air at high velocities into the intake tract, with the resulting laminar flow adhering to the pipe walls.
- Modify the dynamic tuning range of the intake tract by functioning as a resonating pipe, which can adjust the frequency of pressure pulses based on its length within the tract. The length of the stack has a direct effect on an engine's power band.

=== Design ===
Illustration of the velocity stack working principle

Working principle in more detail

The acceleration of air flow into a duct is inherently a highly efficient process, with the difference in flow between the least and most optimized shapes amounting to no more than a few percent. The flow coefficient of a perfect inlet would be 1.0, while the coefficient for a sharp-edged inlet would be 0.6 and a re-entrant inlet 0.5. In practice, these latter types of inlet are never used for engine intakes, and there is always some attempt to smooth the edge of the inlet.

However, as the inlet end is never the smallest or most restrictive part of the system, total engine airflow will not increase by the amount suggested by these figures, which apply only to the entry alone. Because the greatest losses to flow occur near the valve seat, actual overall gain from any improvement at the inlet area would be much less.

In the real world, on a high-revving engine with individual intake runners, using a minimal inlet radius yields stronger pressure waves and a power boost of 2% to 4% over a 3000 to 3500 rpm range. Using a larger radius (like 3/4") broadens out the resonant pressure wave rpm range, but the compression-boosting pressure waves are reduced to negligible levels.

=== Use ===
In modified engines that have them equipped, velocity stacks often replace the original airbox and associated ducting, though many current aftermarket stacks are designed to be used inside of an airbox. Some setups use stacks of identical or differing lengths for each intake tract. On a stack-equipped carbureted engine, a lack of an airbox, ducting, or filters poses a risk of "stand-off", an air–fuel mixture allowed to escape from the combustion chamber into the engine bay, which can be contained by longer stacks or filters over the stacks.

== See also ==
- Stuart Hilborn, fuel injection engineer
- Weber carburetors
