= Alfa Romeo 147 =

Small family car produced by the Italian automaker Alfa Romeo

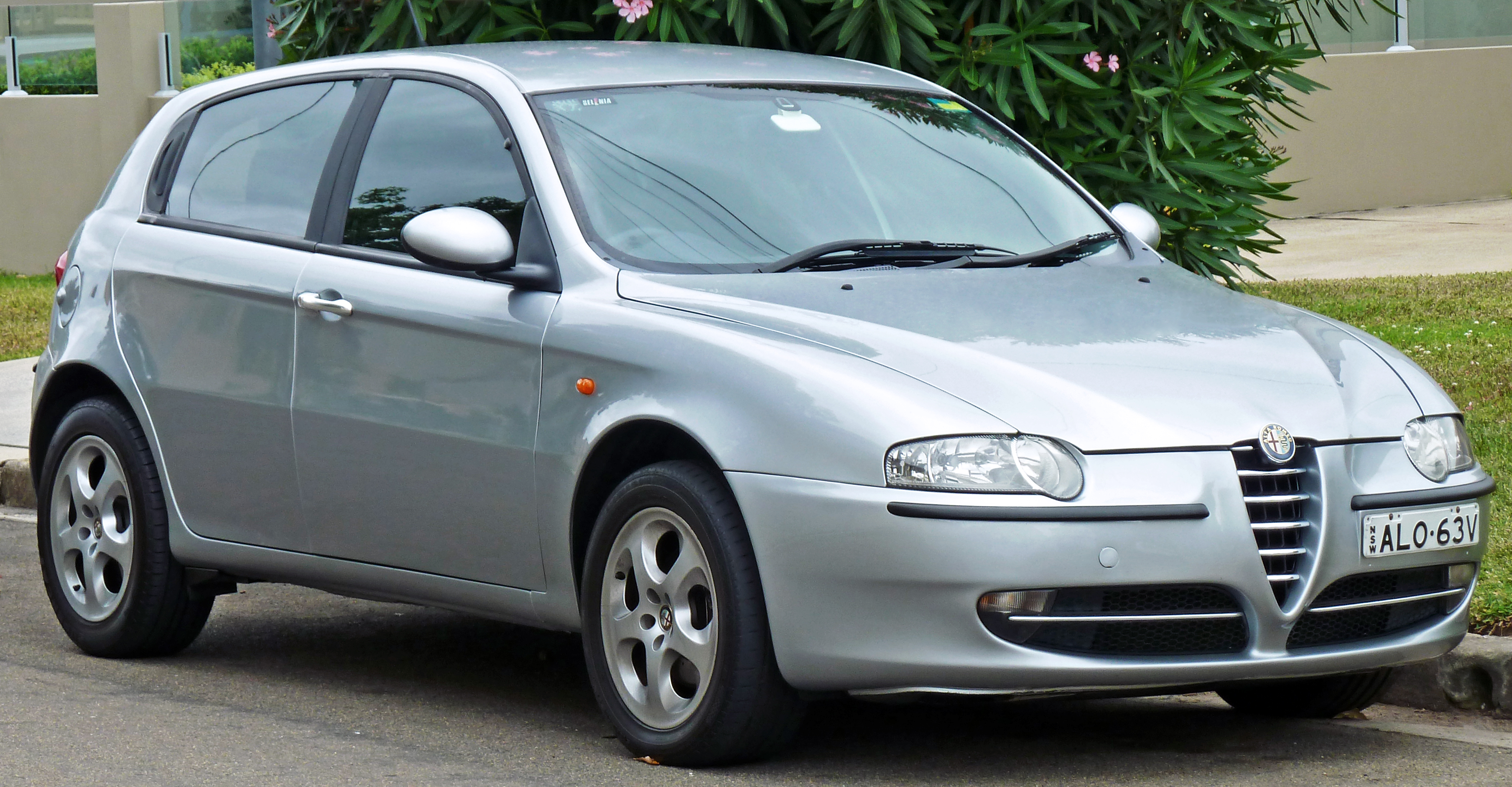
- Alfa Romeo 147 five door, first series (2000 to 2004)

Overview
- Manufacturer: Alfa Romeo (Note: Fiat Auto (2000–2007) Fiat Group Automobiles (2007–2010))
- Model code: 937
- Production: 2000–2010
- Assembly: Italy: Pomigliano d'Arco plant, Campania
- Designer: Walter de Silva and Wolfgang Egger at Centro Stile Alfa Romeo; Giorgetto Giugiaro at Italdesign (restyling)

Body and chassis
- Class: Small family car (C)
- Body style: 3/5-door hatchback
- Layout: Front-engine, front-wheel-drive
- Platform: Type Two rev. 3
- Related: Alfa Romeo GT; Alfa Romeo 156; Alfa Romeo Kamal; Fiat Bravo/Brava; Fiat Marea; Fiat Multipla; Lancia Lybra

Powertrain
- Engine: petrol: 1.6 L Twin Spark 16V I4; 2.0 L Twin Spark 16V I4; 3.2 L Busso 24V V6 (GTA); diesel: 1.9 L Fiat JTD/JTDm 8V/16V turbo I4
- Transmission: 5-speed manual; 6-speed manual; 5-speed Selespeed automated manual; 6-speed Selespeed automated manual

Dimensions
- Wheelbase: 2,546 mm (100.2 in)
- Length: 4,213–4,223 mm (165.9–166.3 in)
- Width: 1,729–1,764 mm (68.1–69.4 in)
- Height: 1,412–1,442 mm (55.6–56.8 in)
- Kerb weight: 1,200–1,360 kg (2,650–3,000 lb)

Chronology
- Predecessor: Alfa Romeo 145/146
- Successor: Alfa Romeo Giulietta (940)

The Alfa Romeo 147 (Type 937) is a small family car produced by the Italian automaker Alfa Romeo from 2000 to 2010. The 147 was voted European Car of the Year in 2001.

The 147 was launched at the Turin Motor Show in June 2000 as a replacement for the Alfa Romeo 145 and 146 hatchbacks and is based on the running gear of the larger 156 saloon. It was sold with 1.6, 2.0, and 3.2-liter petrol engines, and a 1.9-liter diesel engine. A paddle-operated Selespeed automatic transmission was available from launch.

Two trim levels, Turismo and Lusso were available, and the 147 was the first Alfa Romeo to have dual-zone climate control and electronic traction control. In production for ten years, the 147 was one of the oldest small family cars on sale in Europe at the time of its replacement, reaching a production figure of 651,823.

== Styling ==
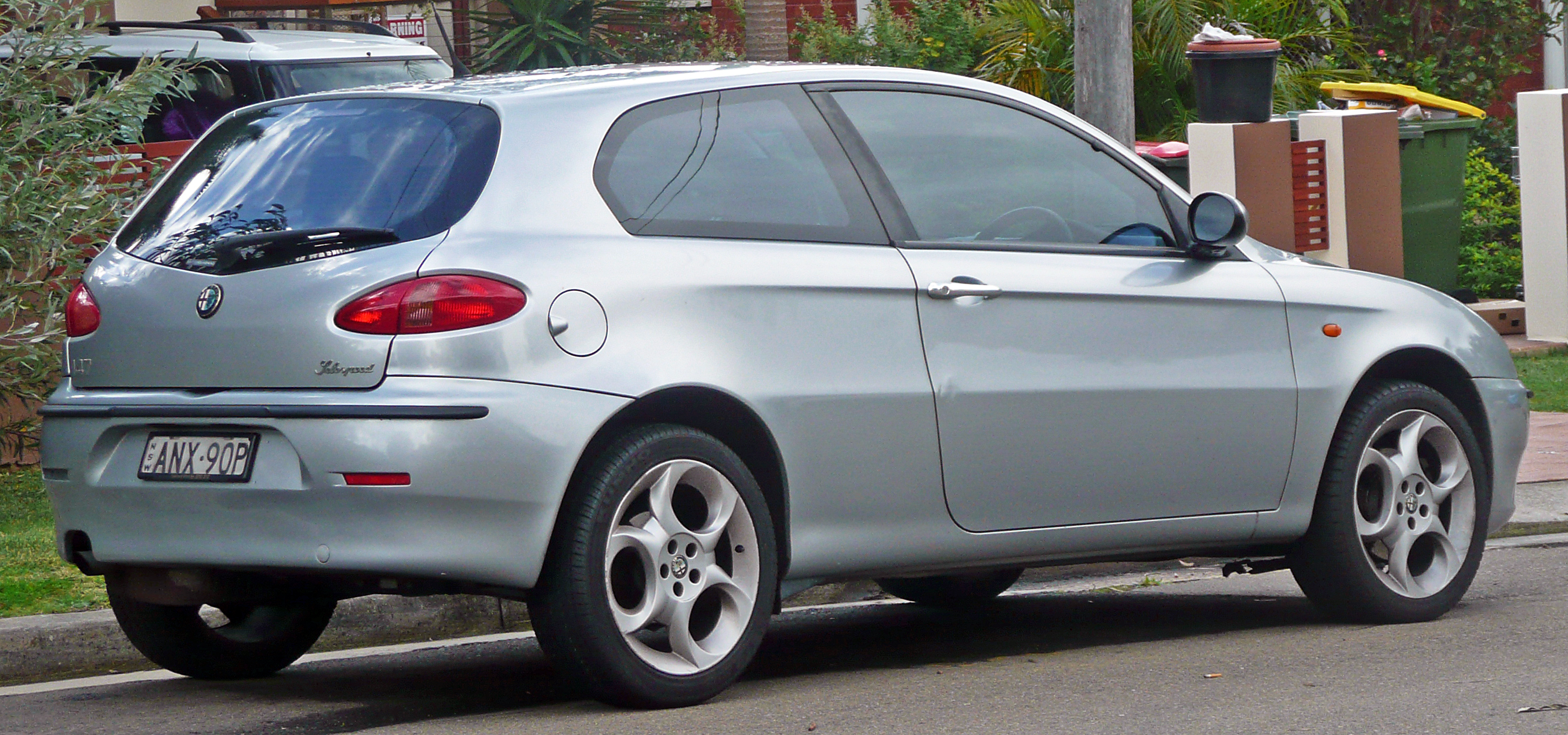
Pre facelift Alfa Romeo 147 Selespeed Twin Spark three-door hatchback (Australia)

The 147 was designed by Walter de Silva and Wolfgang Egger. The 147 received praise for its styling on launch, later it won styling awards. The 147 range was revamped in 2004, with the exterior styling changed to resemble the new 159 and Brera models, and Alfa Romeo Visconti concept car. The 147 had a drag coefficient (C_{d}) of 0.32.

== Launch ==
In 1999, Alfa Romeo confirmed that it would replace its 145/146 hatchbacks with an all-new model, which was unveiled as the 147 at the Turin Motor Show in June 2000. The first deliveries were in October 2000 in left-hand drive markets, and the right-hand-drive UK versions shortly thereafter. It received the 2001 European Car of the Year award.

== Development ==
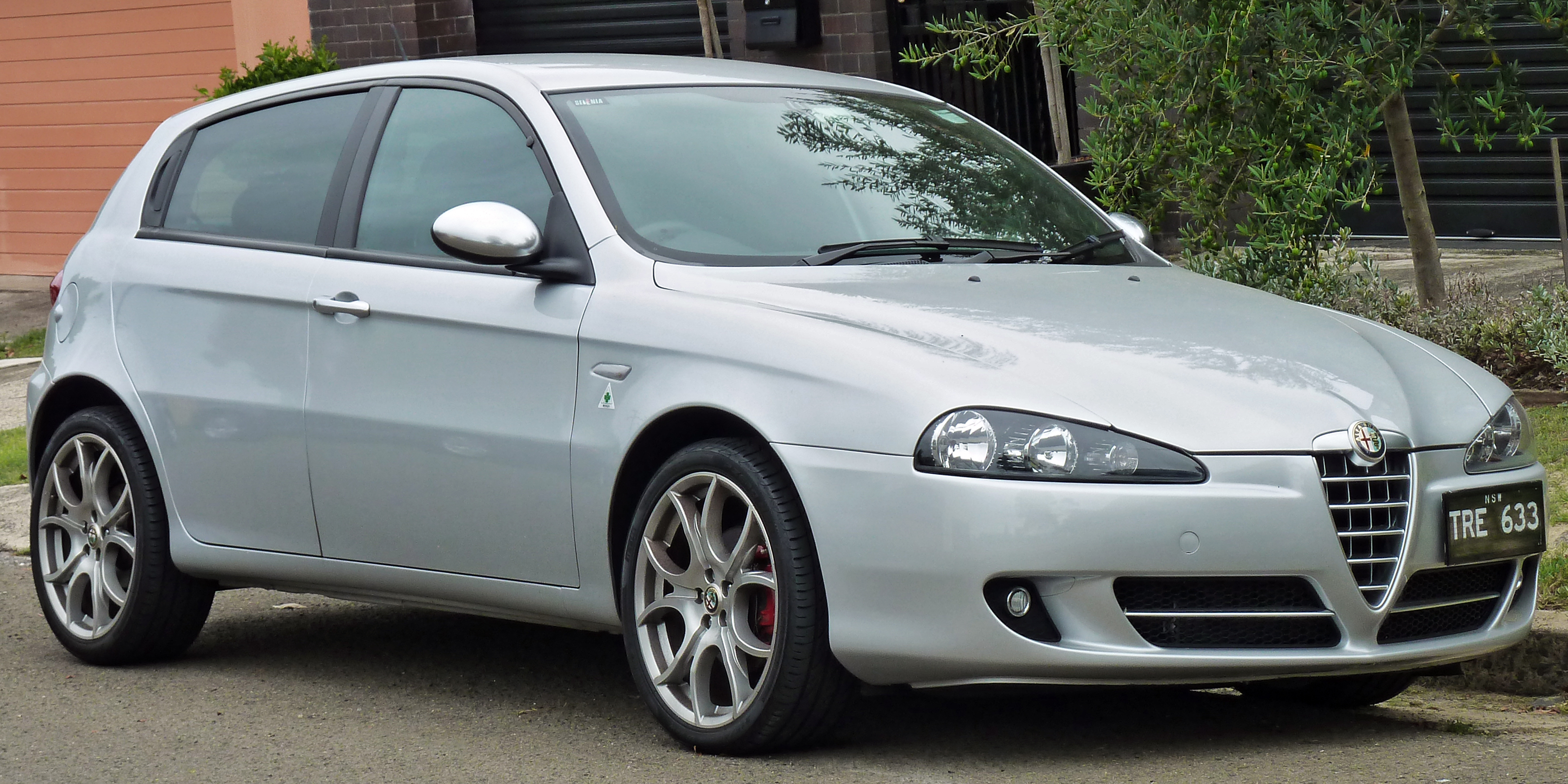
Alfa Romeo 147 (facelift)

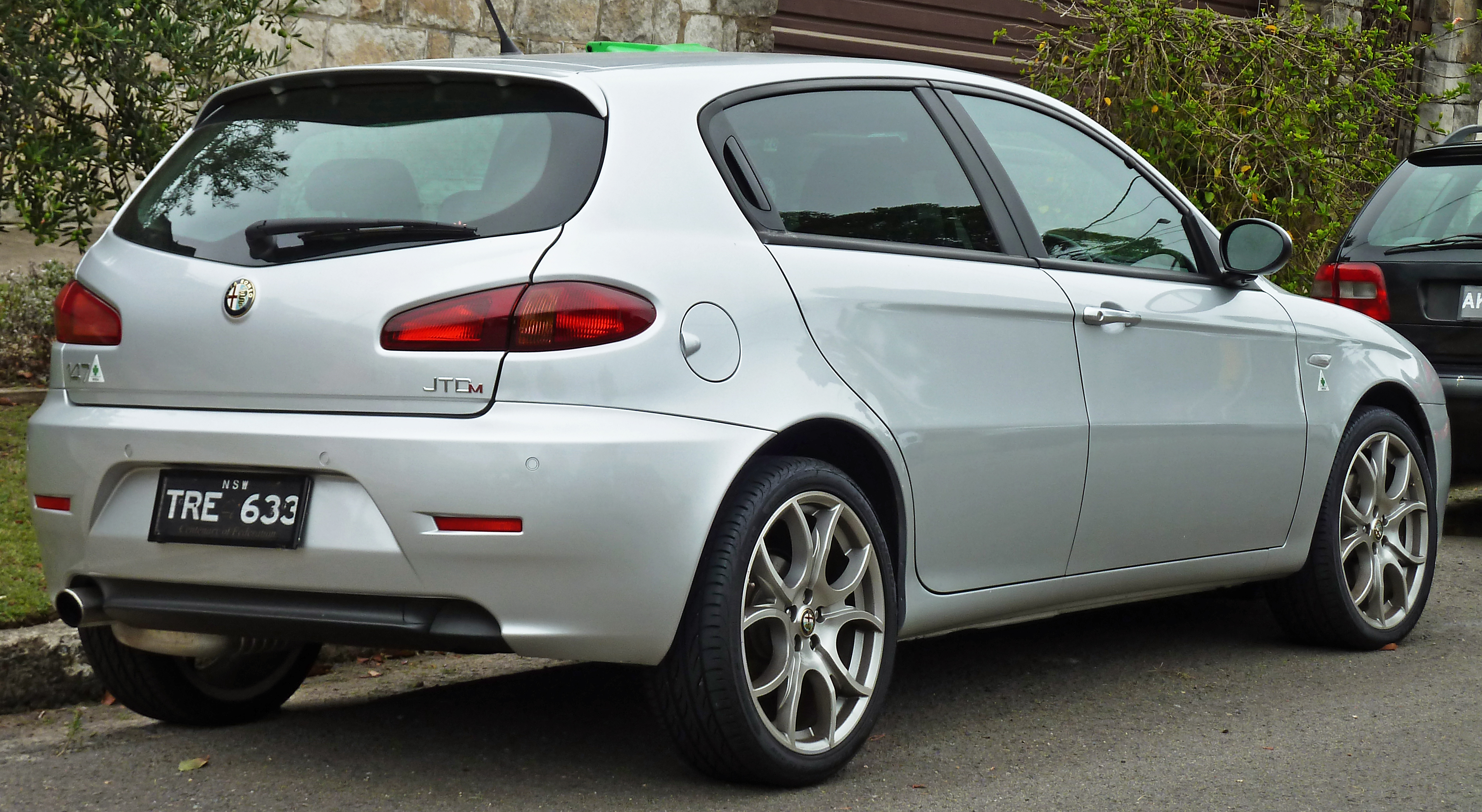
Alfa Romeo 147 (facelift)

The 147 was facelifted at the end of 2004: new front grille, new headlights, new rear lights, and the interior was changed on all models besides the GTA version. A more powerful diesel engine arrived and the suspension was also tweaked.

In 2007, the 147 1.9 JTD Q2 version was launched, with a front Torsen limited-slip differential. Alfa Romeo presented a new limited edition 147 called Ducati Corse at the 2007 Bologna Motor Show. The car had a JTD diesel engine and Q2, a front Torsen limited-slip differential.

The 147 was replaced by the Giulietta in May 2010.

=== High performance versions ===
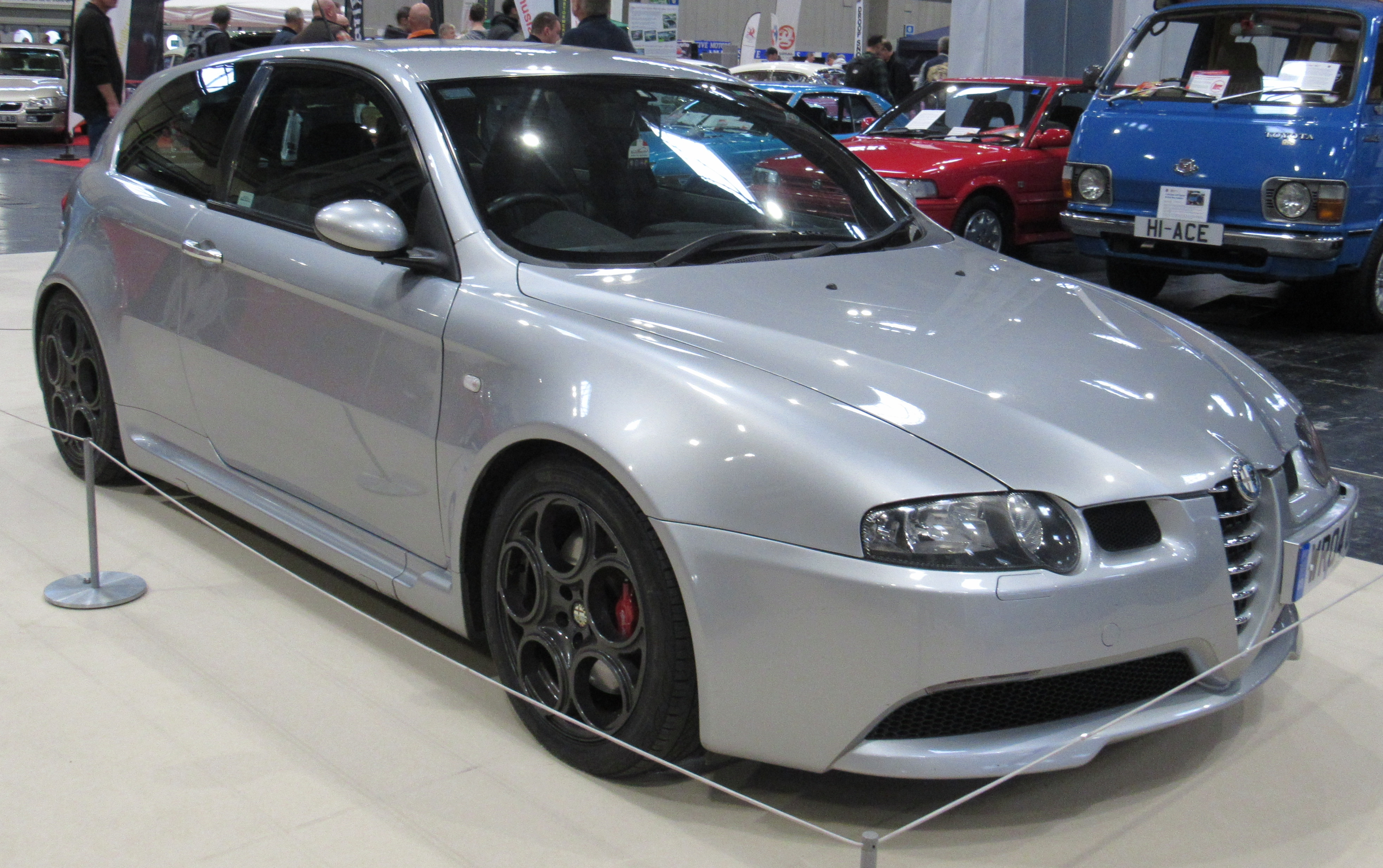
Alfa Romeo 147 GTA

The hot hatch 147 GTA model was launched in 2002. The GTA used a 3.2 V6 engine, produced 250 PS (184 kW; 247 hp) and had a top speed of 246 km/h (153 mph). It has a widened body (15 mm at each side) to accommodate the 225/45R17 tyres.

Most models have six-speed manual transmissions; whilst a smaller number of other models use the Selespeed automated manual system. In total, 5,029 147 GTAs were built, 1004 of which were Selespeeds.

London-based aftermarket tuner Autodelta has produced a "bored out" version of the GTA, sporting a 3.7 litre V6, producing 328 bhp (245 kW), and a split-axle differential gear for the front wheels. Autodelta has also made a Rotrex supercharged version, producing 400 bhp (300 kW).

== Engines ==
Model	Engine	Displacement	Power	Torque	0–100 km/h (0–62 mph)	Top speed	Years
Petrol engines
1.6 TS	I4	1,598 cc	105 PS (77 kW; 104 hp) at 5600 rpm	140 N⋅m (103 lb⋅ft) at 4200 rpm	10.7 s	185 km/h (115 mph)	2000–10
1.6 TS	I4	1,598 cc	120 PS (88 kW; 118 hp) at 6200 rpm	146 N⋅m (108 lb⋅ft) at 4200 rpm	10.2–10.6 s	195 km/h (121 mph)	2000–10
2.0 TS	I4	1,970 cc	150 PS (110 kW; 148 hp) at 6300 rpm	181 N⋅m (133 lb⋅ft) at 3800 rpm	9.3 s	208 km/h (129 mph)	2000–10
3.2 GTA	V6	3,179 cc	250 PS (184 kW; 247 hp) at 6200 rpm	300 N⋅m (221 lbf⋅ft) at 4800 rpm	6.3 s	246 km/h (153 mph)	2002–05
Diesel engines
1.9 JTD 8V	I4	1,910 cc	100 PS (74 kW; 99 hp) at 4000 rpm	200 N⋅m (148 lbf⋅ft) at 1750 rpm	12.1 s	187 km/h (116 mph)	
1.9 JTD 8V	I4	1,910 cc	115 PS (85 kW; 113 hp) at 4000 rpm	275 N⋅m (203 lb⋅ft) at 2000 rpm	9.9 s	189 km/h (117 mph)	
1.9 JTDM 8V	I4	1,910 cc	120 PS (88 kW; 118 hp) at 4000 rpm	280 N⋅m (207 lbf⋅ft) at 2000 rpm	9.6 s	193 km/h (120 mph)	2003–10
1.9 JTD 16V	I4	1,910 cc	126 PS (93 kW; 124 hp) at 4000 rpm	305 N⋅m (225 lb⋅ft) at 2000 rpm	9.4 s	199 km/h (124 mph)	2003–05
1.9 JTD M-Jet 16V	I4	1,910 cc	140 PS (103 kW; 138 hp) at 4000 rpm	305 N⋅m (225 lb⋅ft) at 2000 rpm	9.1 s	206 km/h (128 mph)	2003–10
1.9 JTDM 16V	I4	1,910 cc	150 PS (110 kW; 148 hp) at 4000 rpm	305 N⋅m (225 lb⋅ft) at 2000 rpm	8.8 s	208 km/h (129 mph)	2005–10
1.9 JTDM 16V	I4	1,910 cc	170 PS (125 kW; 168 hp) at 3750 rpm	330 N⋅m (243 lbf⋅ft) at 2000 rpm	8.0 s	215 km/h (134 mph)	2007–10

== Connect ==
Connect is an onboard information system: an onboard telematics system located in the central console that via its 5 in (130 mm) monitor gave access to satellite navigation and hands free GSM phone as well as allowing the user to adjust radio and CD player settings.

== Reception ==
Euro NCAP test results Alfa Romeo 147 (2001)
Test	Score	Rating
Adult occupant:	21	3 /5 stars
Pedestrian:	17	2 /4 stars

The handling of 147 was praised in some reviews, in spite of criticism regarding the light (sensitive) steering, which makes some drivers feel less involved. However, light steering does help during parking maneuvers. Other criticisms of the 147 included a cumbersome gearshift, unsupportive seats, and the lack of interior space compared to its rivals.

The car was noted for its pleasant engine note. The 147 suffers from fairly poor resale value in Great Britain.

The 147 GTA and 147 Autodelta GTA have been road tested by Jeremy Clarkson, and featured on television show Top Gear, with a power lap around the track by The Stig. In his review of Autodelta 147 GTA car for The Sunday Times, Clarkson described the acceleration as "Ferrari throttle? Forget it. When you stamp on the accelerator it's like you've hit the Millennium Falcon's hyperdrive.

=== Awards ===
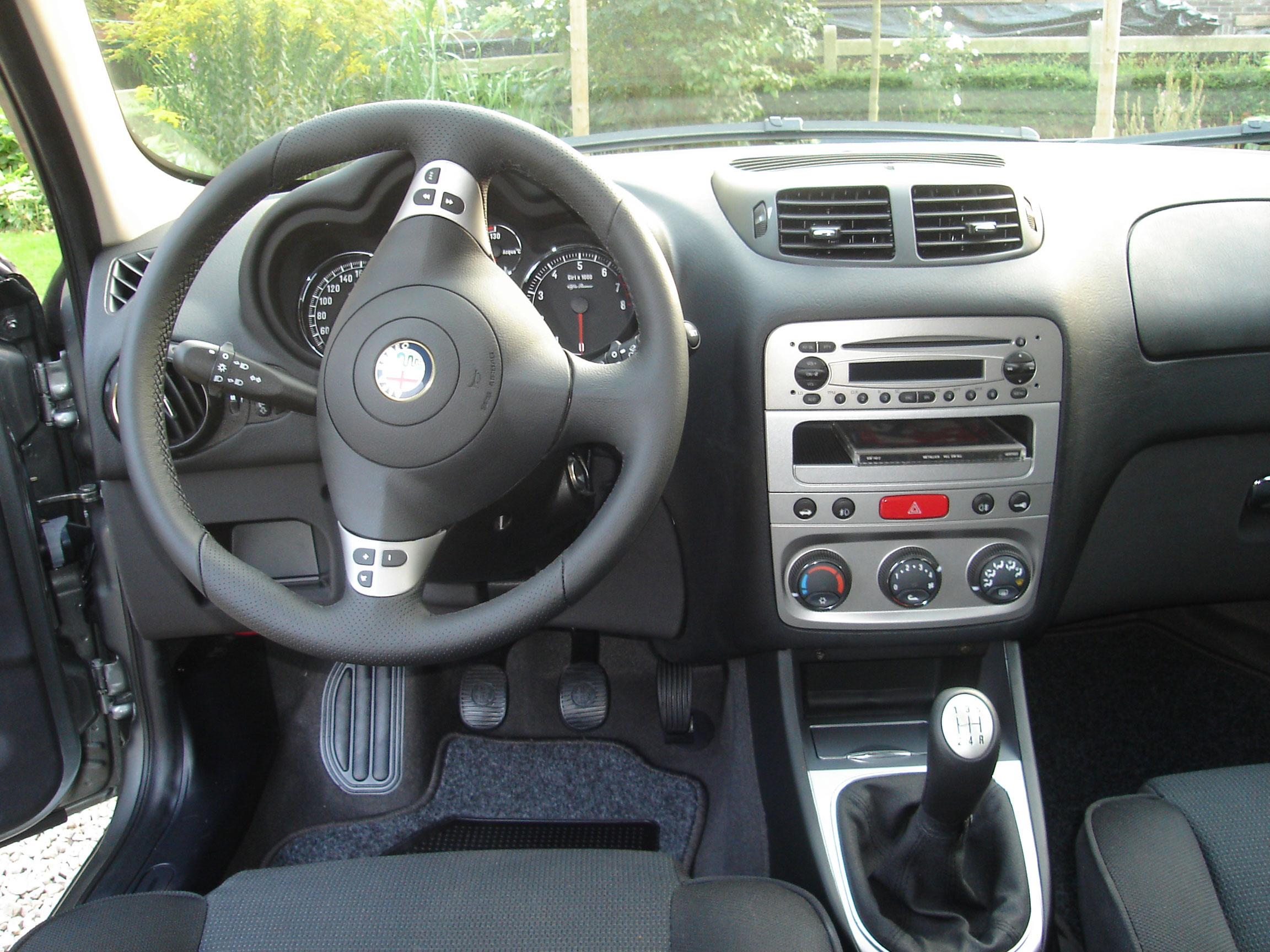
Interior

The Alfa Romeo 147 won over twenty awards including:

- The European Car of the Year in 2001;
- Das Goldene Lenkrad ("The golden steering wheel", BILD am SONNTAG – Germany) in 2000;
- Auto Europa 1 (Panel of engineers, drivers, and journalists headed by Auto Bild – Germany) in 2001;
- Trophées du design (Automobile Magazine – France) in 2000; and
- Carro Importado do Ano no Brasil – (Brazil Import Car of the Year) in 2002.

== Motorsport ==
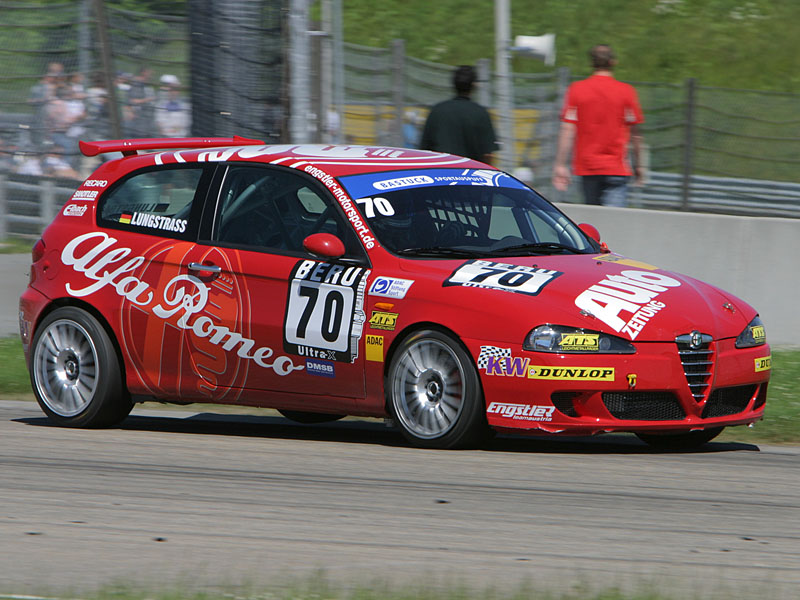
The 147 JTD of Markus Lungstrass in the 2005 Sachsenring DMSB Production Car Championship

In Europe, there was a one-car racing series, European Alfa 147 Challenge for Alfa 147 Cup race cars starting from 2003. In 2005, this series ran alongside the World Touring Car Championship, winner of the season of 2005 was Irish driver Eoin Murray. The car used on the series was the Alfa 147 Cup producing 220 bhp (160 kW) from its straight-4 1970 cc Twin Spark engine.

A 147 2.0 TS (200 bhp) was used by Czech rally driver Martin Rada, finishing second in N3 group (21st overall) on Rally Monte Carlo in 2009, and later finishing first in group 8 on Rally Monte Carlo 2012 (42nd overall)

The 147 also competed briefly in the British Touring Car Championship in 2001 with the JSM team, with a best finish of 3rd at Oulton Park, thanks to driver/team owner Tim Harvey. The car won the 2001, 2003 and 2004 Italian Superturismo Championship and won the Super Production class of the 2005 European Touring Car Cup with driver Lorenzo Falessi.
