= VANOS =

BMW variable valve timing system

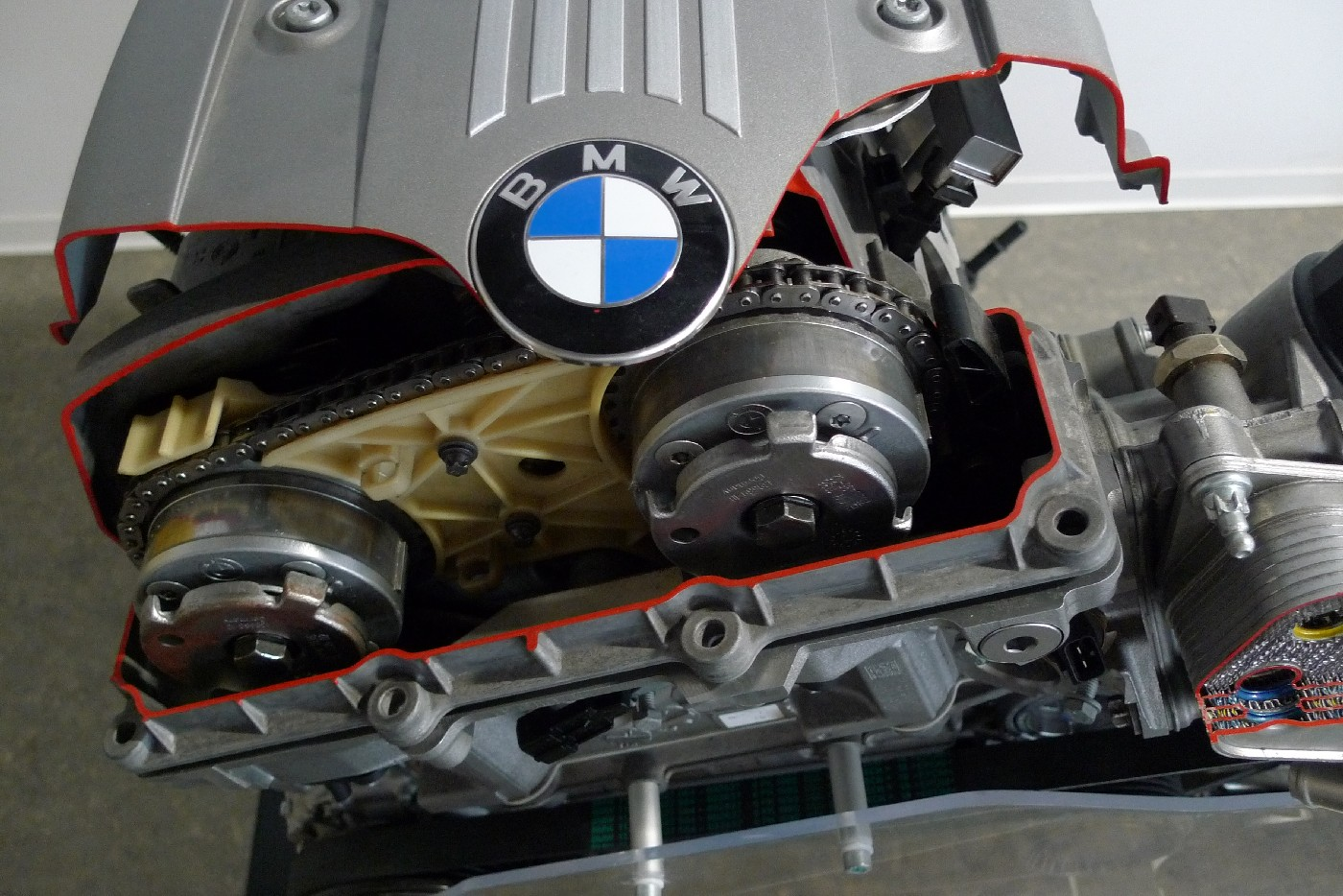
VANOS units on the intake and exhaust camshafts of a BMW N52 engine

VANOS is a variable valve timing system used by BMW on various automotive petrol engines since 1992. The name is an abbreviation of the German words for variable camshaft timing (German: variable Nockenwellensteuerung).

The initial version (retrospectively renamed "single VANOS") was solely used on the intake camshaft, while the later "double VANOS" systems are used on intake and exhaust camshafts. Since 2001, VANOS is often used in conjunction with the Valvetronic variable valve lift system.

== Operation ==
VANOS is a variator system that varies the timing of the valves by moving the position and the camshafts in relation to the drive gear. The relative timing between inlet and exhaust valves is changed.

At lower engine speeds, the position of the camshaft is moved so the valves are opened later, as this improves idling quality and smooth power development. As the engine speed increases, the valves are opened earlier: this enhances torque, reduces fuel consumption and lowers emissions. At high engine speeds, the valves are opened later again, because this allows full power delivery.

== Single VANOS ==
The first-generation single VANOS system adjusts the timing of the intake camshaft to one of two positions — e.g. the camshaft is advanced at certain engine speeds. VANOS was first introduced in 1992 on the BMW M50 engine used in 3 and 5 Series. In 1998 single infinitely variable VANOS was introduced on the BMW M62 V8 engine.

== Double VANOS ==
The second-generation double VANOS system adjusts the timing of the intake and exhaust camshafts with continuously variable adjustment, based on engine speed and throttle opening. The first double VANOS system appeared on the S50B32 engine in 1996.

== See also ==
- Valvetronic – BMW's variable valve lift system
