= Alfa Romeo 156 =

Compact executive car

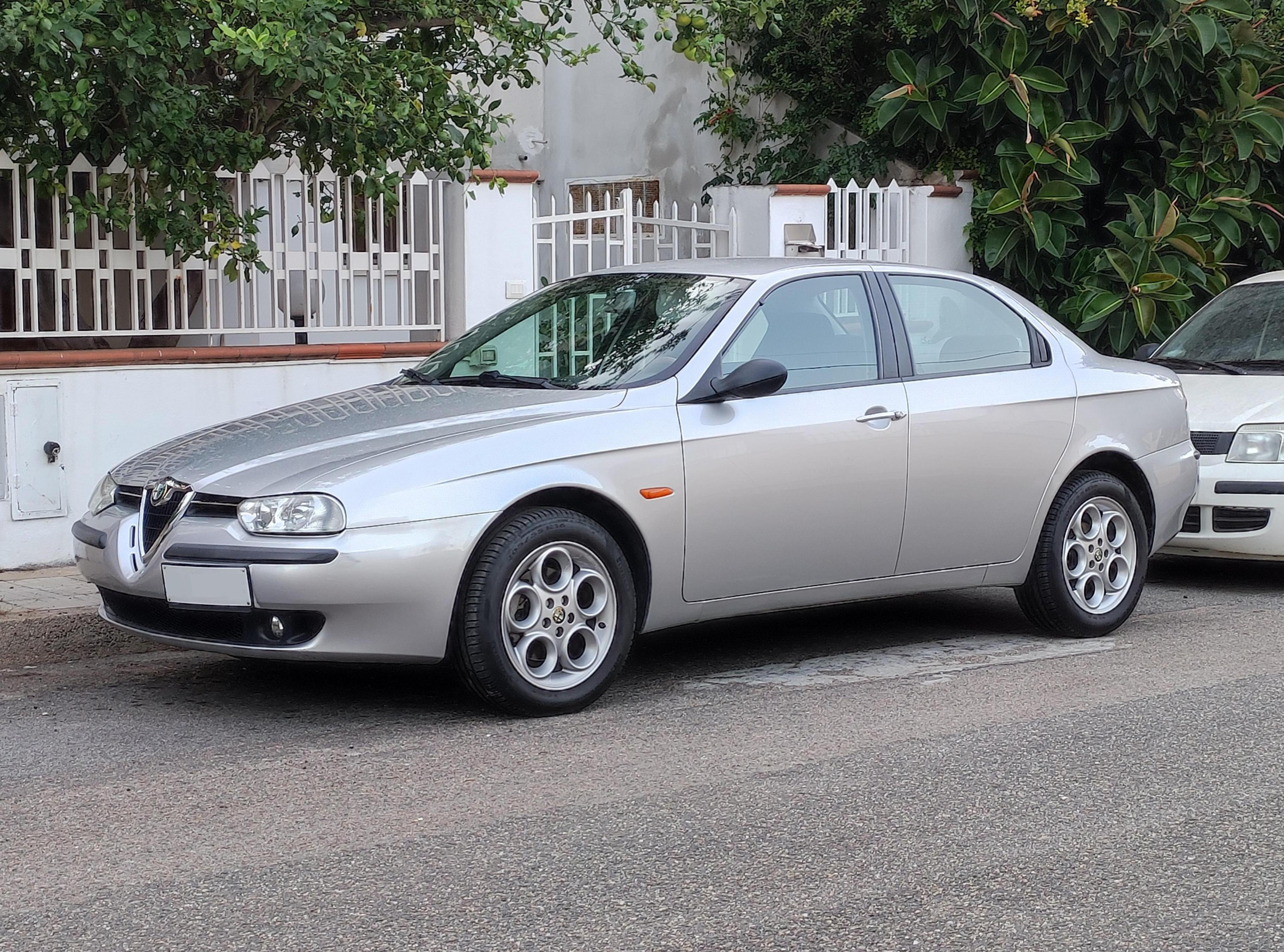
- Alfa Romeo 156

Overview
- Manufacturer: Alfa Romeo
- Production: 1996–2007
- Assembly: Italy: Pomigliano d'Arco (Pomigliano d'Arco plant); Thailand: Rayong (GM Thailand)
- Designer: Walter de Silva at Centro Stile Alfa Romeo; Giorgetto Giugiaro at Italdesign (2003 facelift)

Body and chassis
- Class: Compact executive car (D)
- Body style: 4-door saloon; 5-door estate; 5-door crossover
- Layout: Front-engine, front-wheel-drive; Front-engine, four-wheel-drive
- Platform: Type Two rev. 3
- Related: Alfa Romeo 147; Alfa Romeo GT; Fiat Bravo/Brava; Fiat Marea; Lancia Lybra; Alfa Romeo Dardo

Powertrain
- Engine: Petrol: 1.6 L Twin Spark 16V I4; 1.8 L Twin Spark 16V I4; 2.0 L Twin Spark 16V I4; 2.0 L JTS 16V I4; 2.5 L Busso 24V V6; 3.2 L Busso 24V V6; Diesel: 1.9 L JTD common rail turbo 8V/16V I4; 2.4 L JTD common rail turbo 10V/20V I5
- Transmission: 5-speed manual; 6-speed manual; 5-speed Selespeed automated manual; 6-speed Selespeed automated manual (GTA); 4-speed Aisin Q-System automatic

Dimensions
- Wheelbase: 2,595 mm (102.2 in)
- Length: 4,430 mm (174.4 in); 4,441 mm (174.8 in) (Sportwagon Q4); 4,441 mm (174.8 in) (Crosswagon Q4)
- Width: 1,743 mm (68.6 in); 1,765 mm (69.5 in) (Crosswagon Q4)
- Height: 1,415 mm (55.7 in); 1,430 mm (56.3 in) (Sportwagon); 1,458 mm (57.4 in) (Sportwagon Q4); 1,497 mm (58.9 in) (Crosswagon Q4)
- Kerb weight: 1,230–1,530 kg (2,712–3,373 lb)

Chronology
- Predecessor: Alfa Romeo 155
- Successor: Alfa Romeo 159

The Alfa Romeo 156 (Type 932) is a compact executive car produced by the Italian automobile manufacturer Alfa Romeo. It was introduced at the 1997 Frankfurt Motor Show as the replacement for the Alfa Romeo 155. The 156 received a positive reception and in the following year went on to win the 1998 European Car of the Year award. The 156 saloon was discontinued in Europe late in 2005, while the Q4 Crosswagon continued in production until the end of 2007.

Cars were assembled at the Fiat Group factory in Pomigliano d'Arco, Italy and at a General Motors facility in Rayong, Thailand. Production in Thailand began in March 2002 and ran for only a couple of years. The cars produced there were targeted for the Asia-Pacific markets. Between 1996 and 2007, 673,435 units of the 156 were produced.

The 156 was available in saloon, Sportwagon (estate) and Crosswagon (crossover) bodystyles with seven engine configurations; it went through two facelifts, first in 2002 and then in 2003. The Sportwagon advertising campaign was made featuring actress Catherine Zeta-Jones.

In 2005, the 159 became the replacement for the 156.

== Overview ==
Since the 156's introduction, various four cylinder engine configurations were available and included the Alfa Romeo Twin Spark engine (1.6 L - 120 PS (88 kW), 1.8 L - 144 PS (106 kW) and 2.0 L - 155 PS (114 kW)) 16 valve models with variable valve timing, along with the straight-4 1.9-litre 8-valve 105 PS (77 kW). The range also included a straight-5 2.4-litre 10-valve 136 PS (100 kW) JTD common rail turbodiesel engine. Until January 2002, the range-topping engine was the venerable 2.5-litre 24-valve Busso V6 - now with double overhead camshafts and four-valve heads - rated at 190 PS (140 kW).

Initially the 156 range was available with different options (packs) like a sport pack that included Blitz clothing, Momo leather interior and Recaro seats, it also included 16-inch (410 mm) wheels, lowered suspension and leather-trimmed steering wheel and gear knob. The Lusso pack added with Momo's mahogany steering wheel and gear knob and for Nordic countries, a special winter pack consisting of fog lights, headlight washers, and heated seats was available.

Starting from 1999 a five-speed Selespeed automated manual transmission was available as an option on the 2.0-litre Twin Spark version and a four-speed automatic Q-System on the 2.5-litre V6 version, the Q-system provided the option of using the car as a normal automatic or being able to shift manually with H-pattern, it has three automatic modes: city, sport and ice.

A significant addition to the 156 range came in 2000 with the introduction of the Sportwagon station wagon or estate bodystyle, debuting at the Geneva Motor Show. The new bodystyle was in development from 1998 by Stola under the project code '932 AF'. According to Stola's records the initial considered name was "Powerwagon". While not a core part of the company's range, estate versions of the Alfasud and 33 - the first to carry the name Sportwagon - were produced and a 75 Sportwagon was shown at Geneva, but became an early victim of the Fiat takeover. The Sportwagon was also available with Boge-Nivomat self-levelling hydropneumatic rear suspension. The Sportwagon was marketed as a lifestyle estate without large carrying capacity. The Sportwagon bodystyle filled a gap in the market that Alfa Romeo had distanced themselves from since the 33 SportWagon of the 1980s.

In 2001 engines were upgraded to comply with the Euro III standards and were rated at 120 PS (88 kW) (1.6 L), 140 PS (103 kW) (1.8 L), 150 PS (110 kW) (2.0 L) and 192 PS (141 kW) (2.5 L).

== Design ==
Designed by Alfa Centro Stile under the guidance of head designer Walter de'Silva the 156s shape was intended to be distinctly Alfa Romeo. Its styling included high, curved flanks, retro styled front door handles, recessed rear door handles, and a deep grille requiring an off-centre licence plate holder. The design featured visually deemphasized rear door handles and accentuated front handles, giving the illusion of a coupé profile. The design was influenced by the Alfa Romeo 1900, Giulietta and Giulia. The 156 achieved a drag coefficient (C_{d}) of 0.31.

=== Interior ===
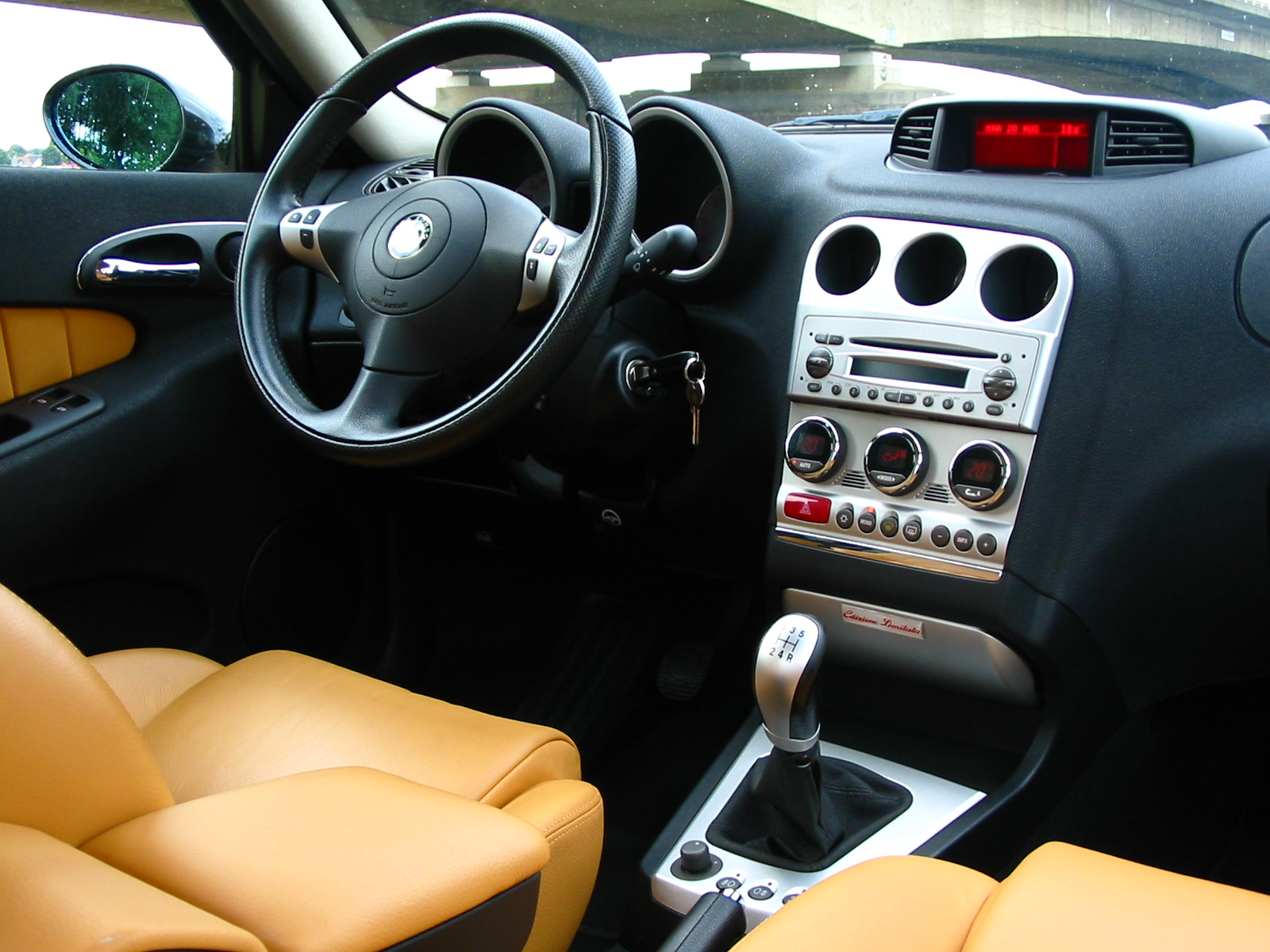

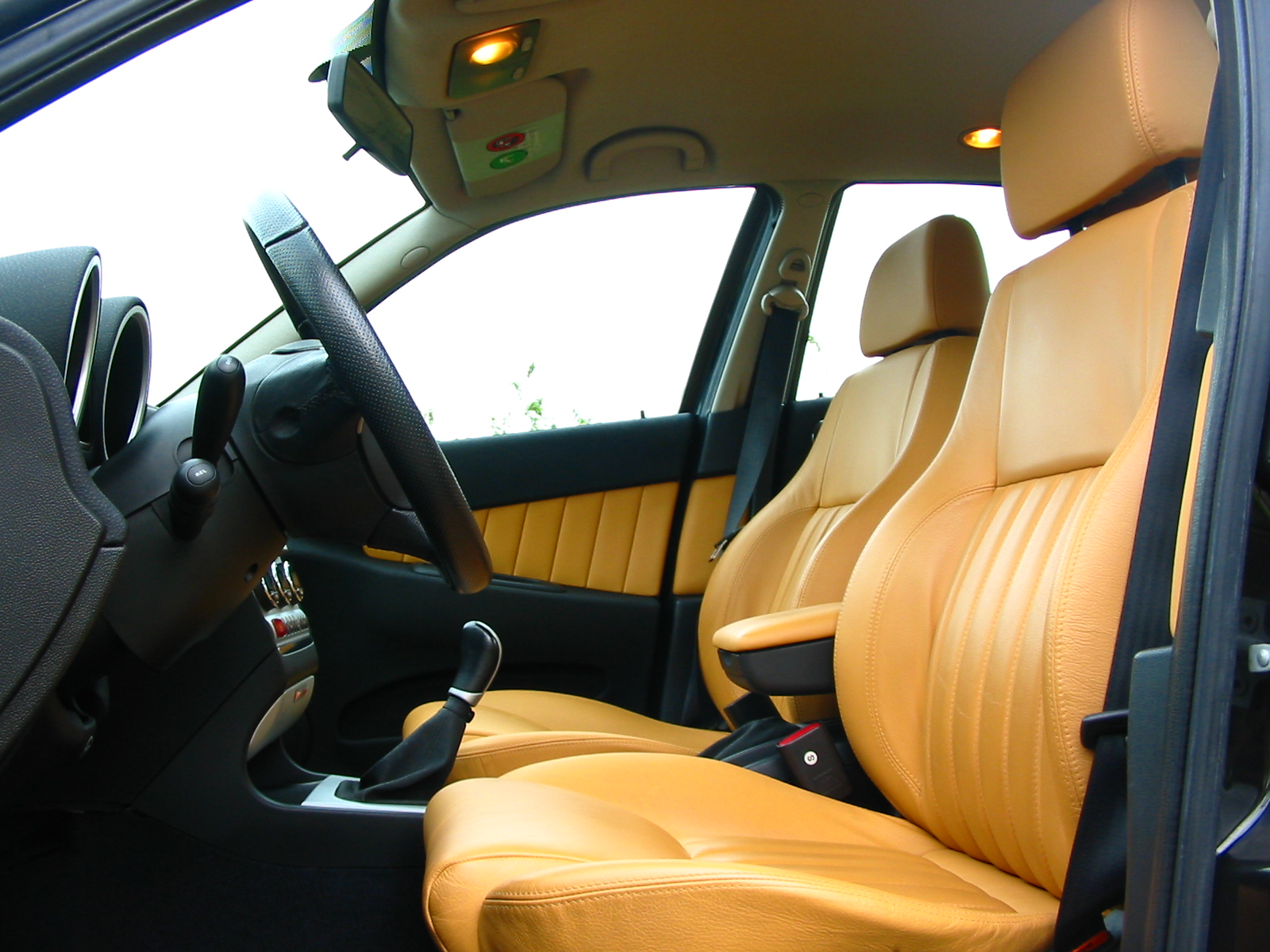
Interior of the first series facelift (2002)

The original interior uses a scalloped upper dashboard and a simple centre console. The main controls and displays are angled to the driver. The interior design lacks cup holders.

The 156 Sportwagon features fold-down rear seats to increase the luggage area normally covered by a privacy screen.

2002 saw an update to both the interior and exterior of the 156.

== Facelifts ==
=== 2002 facelift (first series) ===
2002 also saw the arrival of a facelifted interior with different matte-finish surfacing and chrome highlights. This new version featured the 147's dual-zone digital climate controller while the interior climate could also be controlled via an air quality sensor. A different choice of colours were available for the interior, with the option of a two-tone interior very much like that on offer from its European rivals. A wider range of options including xenon lighting, tele-informatics (CONNECT and CONNECT NAV) and a Bose stereo system were available, the stereo system could now also be operated via buttons on the steering wheel. Also, the Selespeed gearbox control system was updated, buttons on the steering wheel were replaced by paddle shifters, as seen on the earlier Alfa Romeo 147. In the center console, the designers added a multifunctional display with trip computer, fault, and service monitor.

The upgrade also included electronic stability control VDC (Vehicle Dynamic Control) with an emergency brake assist device and slip control ASR (Anti Slip Regulation) came as standard. Additionally, an MSR (Motor Schleppmoment Regelung) was added to the car, this device prevents wheel skidding by restoring torque to the engine for example when the gear is shifted down abruptly under conditions of low grip. Passive safety was also made better, all versions got window airbags as standard. The 2.0 L JTS 165 PS (121 kW) engine with gasoline direct injection replaced the 2.0-litre Twin Spark engine, offering more low end torque and more power than the Twin Spark. The diesel engines were also uprated. The only notable difference exterior-wise was body-coloured mirrors and bumper strips which were earlier black.

=== 2003 facelift (second series) ===
Late 2003 saw the launch of a facelifted 156, with new front and rear fascias designed by Giorgetto Giugiaro. A new top-of-the-line model was added to the line up called TI (Turismo Internazionale) designating a sporty kit, this version was equipped with modified suspension, bigger wheels (215/45 17") and leather-trimmed interior. The GTA models never received the exterior update. Diesel engines underwent a major overhaul which included a new four-valve per cylinder heads and a second stage common rail injection with 1400 bar maximum injection pressure with up to five injections per cycle for lower noise, consumption, and higher performance. They were rated at 140/150 PS (103/110 kW) for straight-4 1.9-litre 16-valve and 175 PS (129 kW) for straight-5 2.4-litre 20-valve.

Pre-facelift

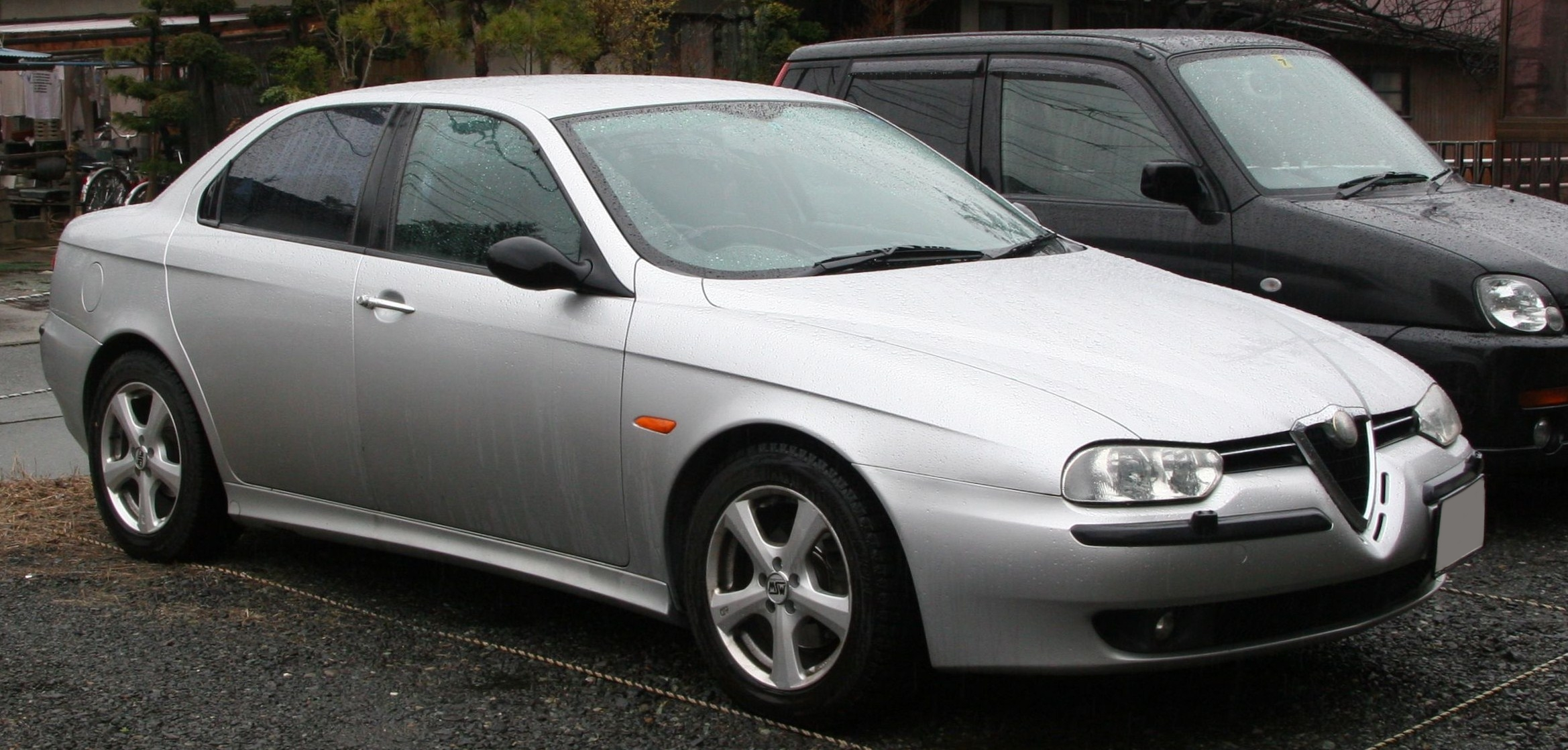
Front

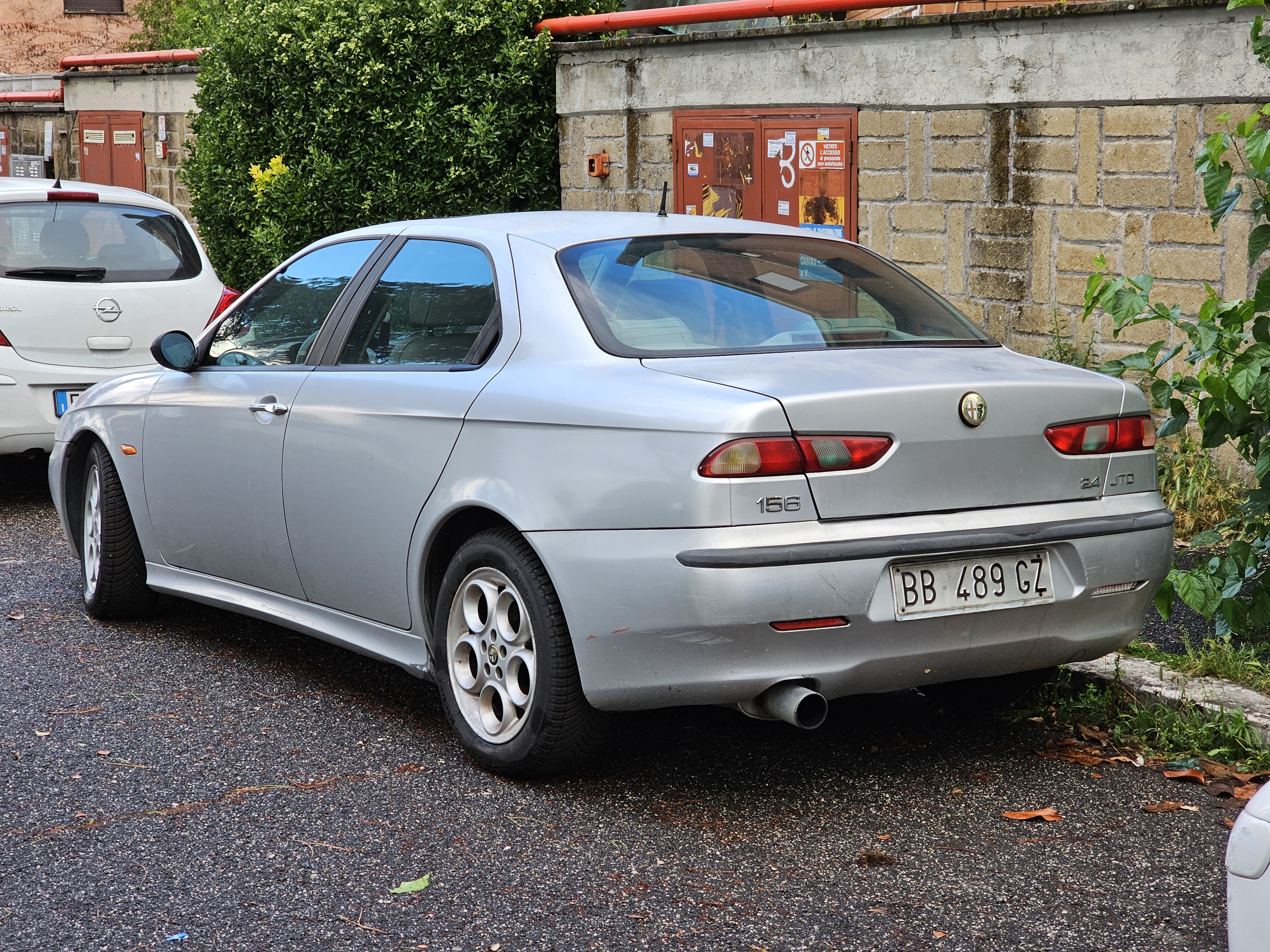
Rear

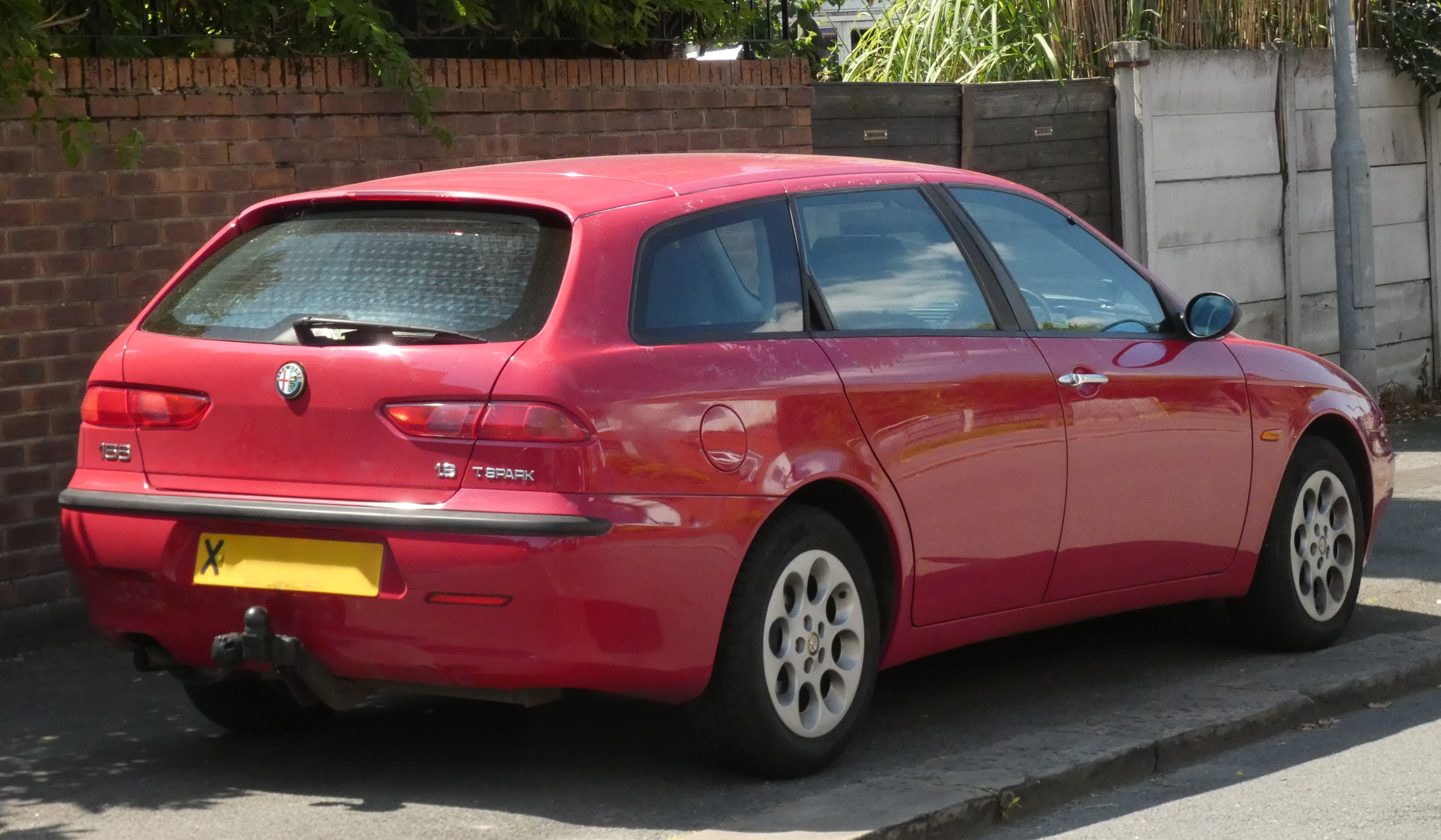
Rear (wagon)

First-facelift

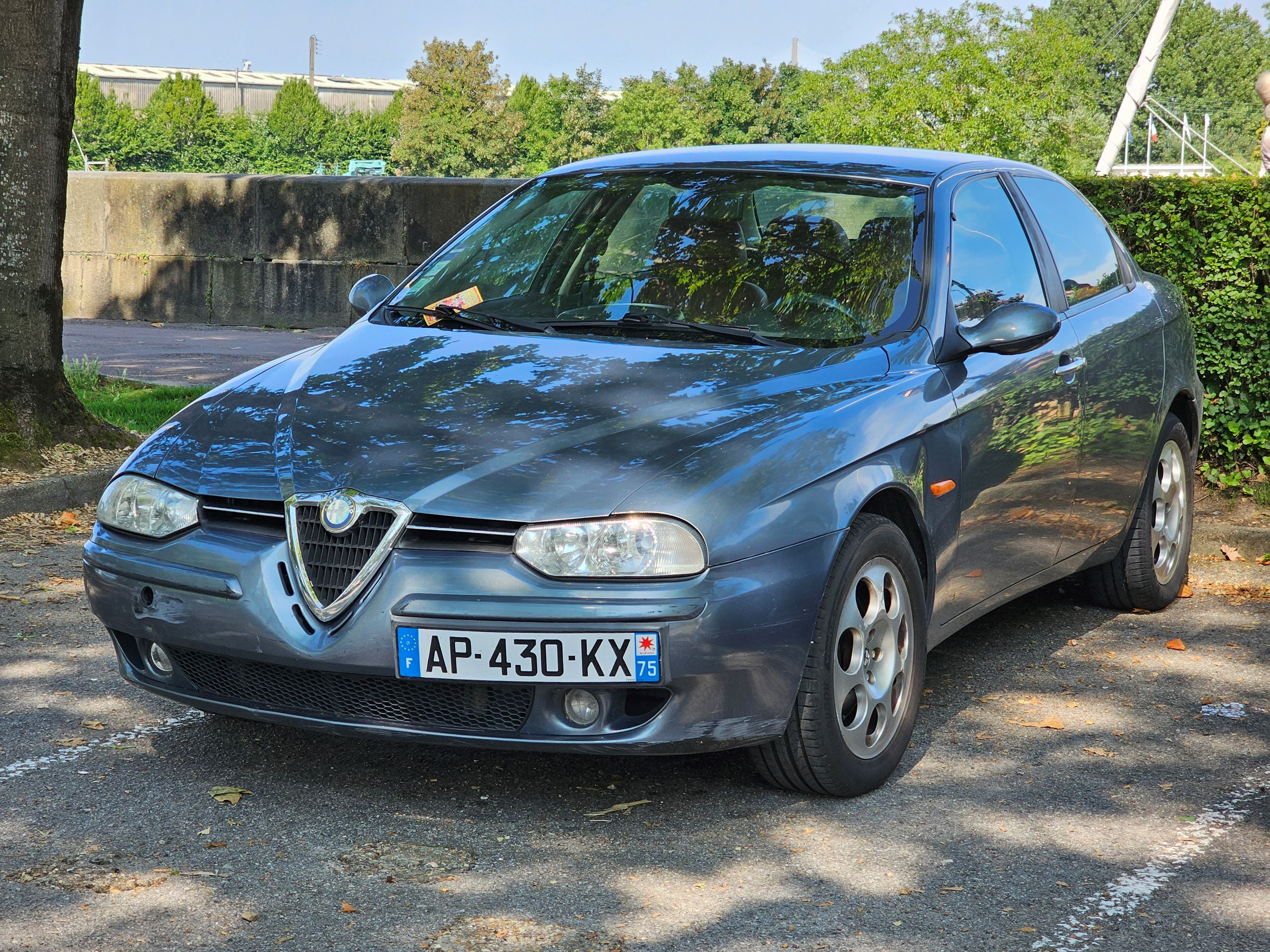
Front

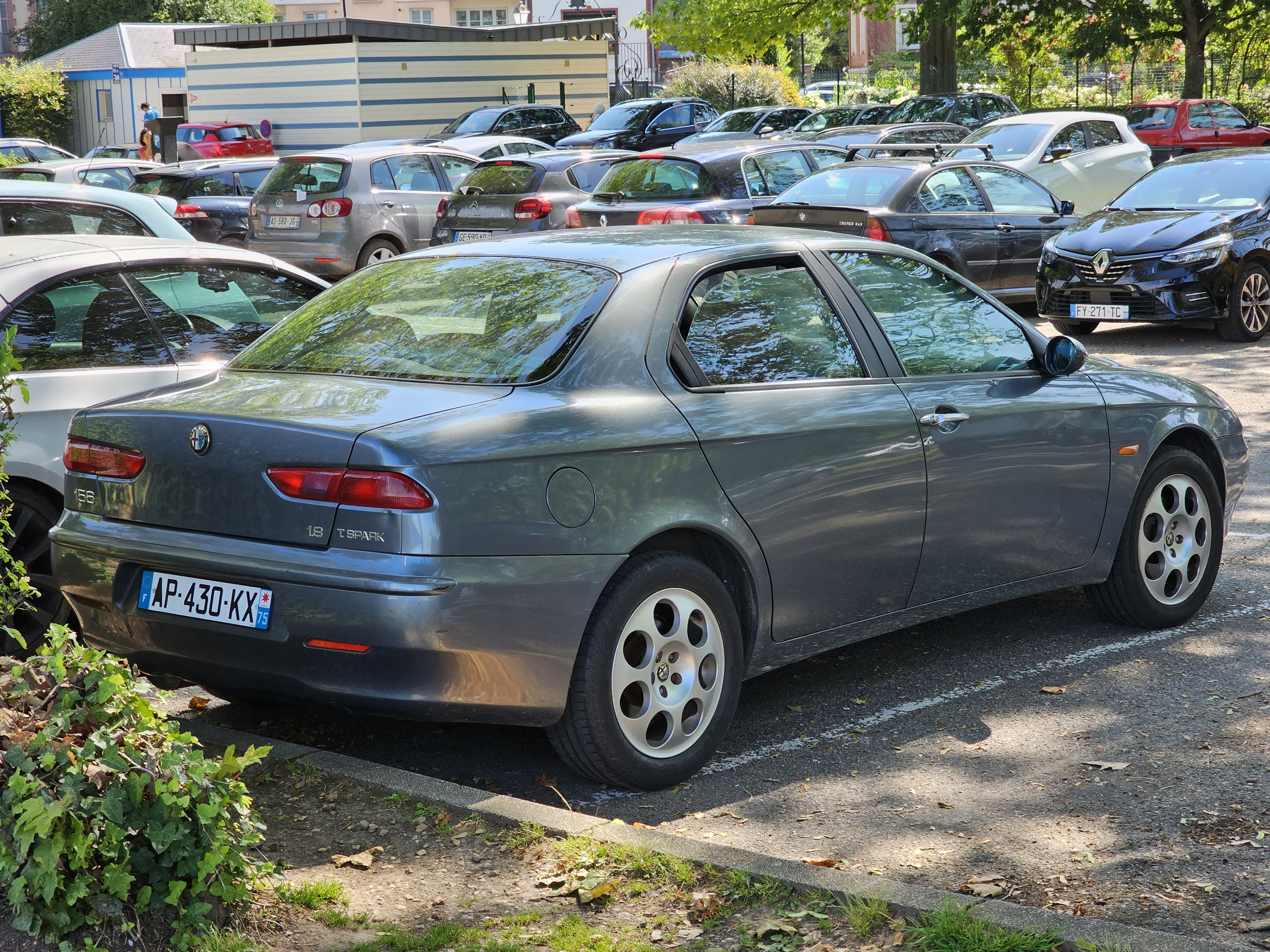
Rear

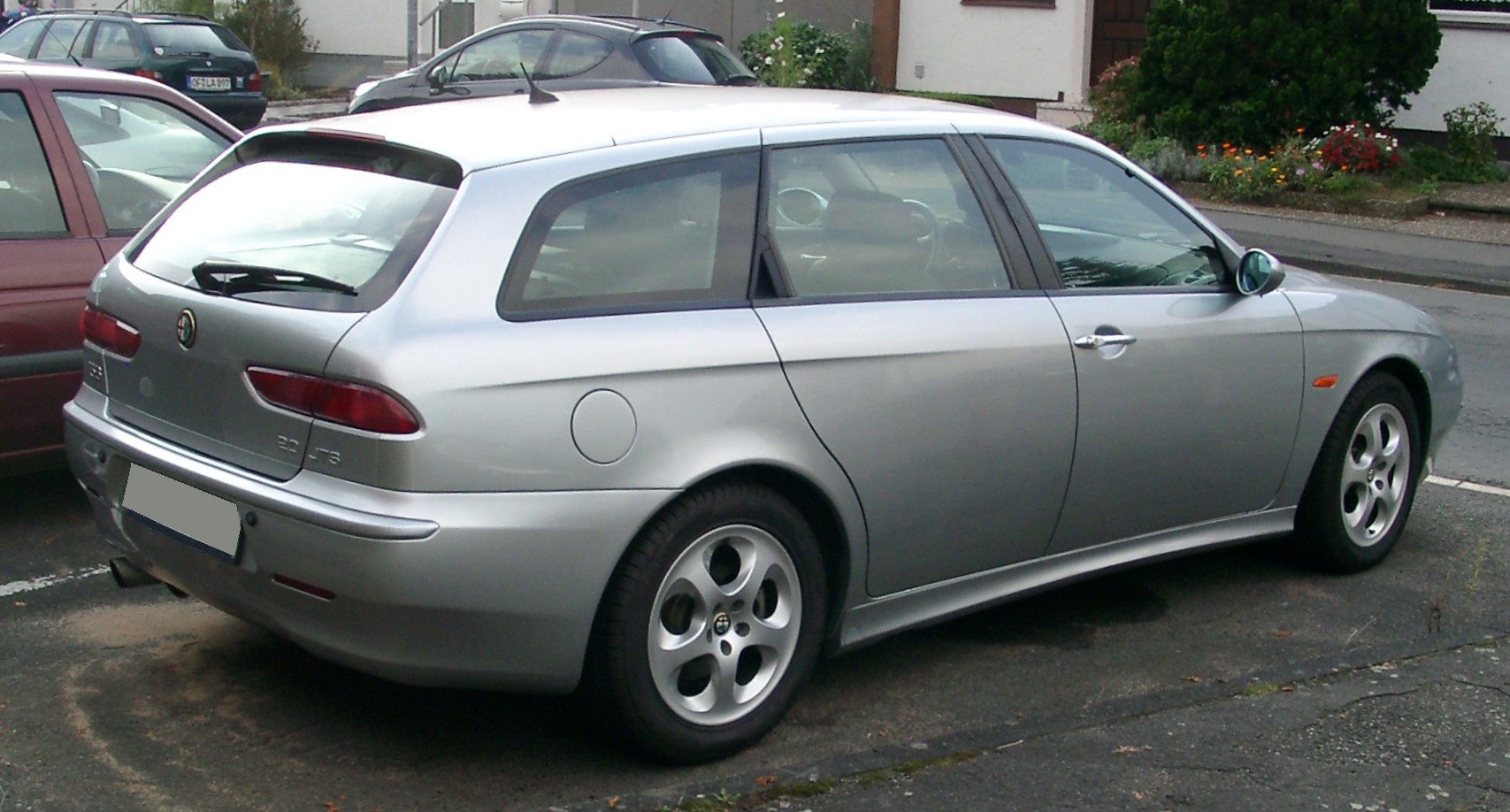
Rear (wagon)

Second-facelift

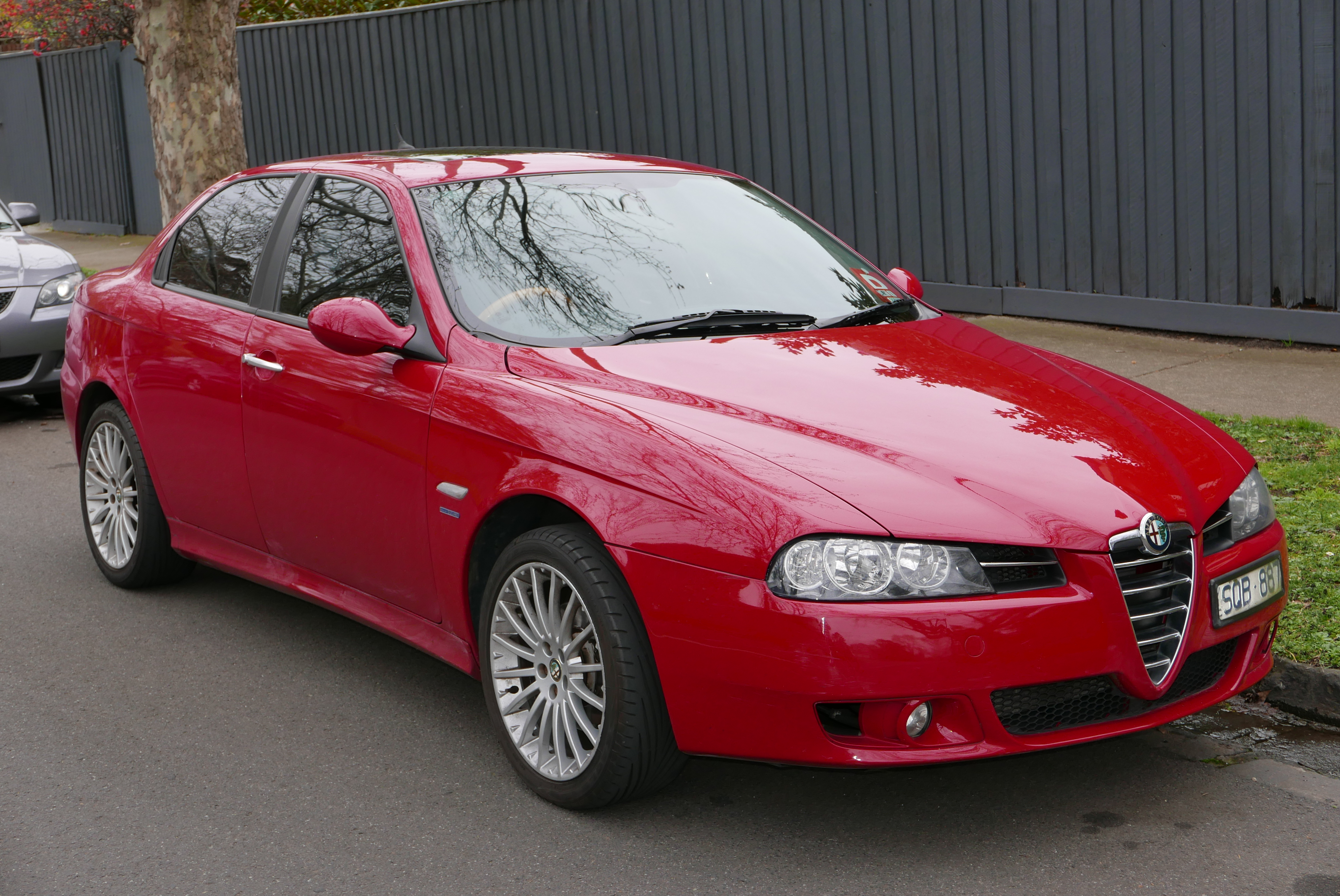
Front (sedan)

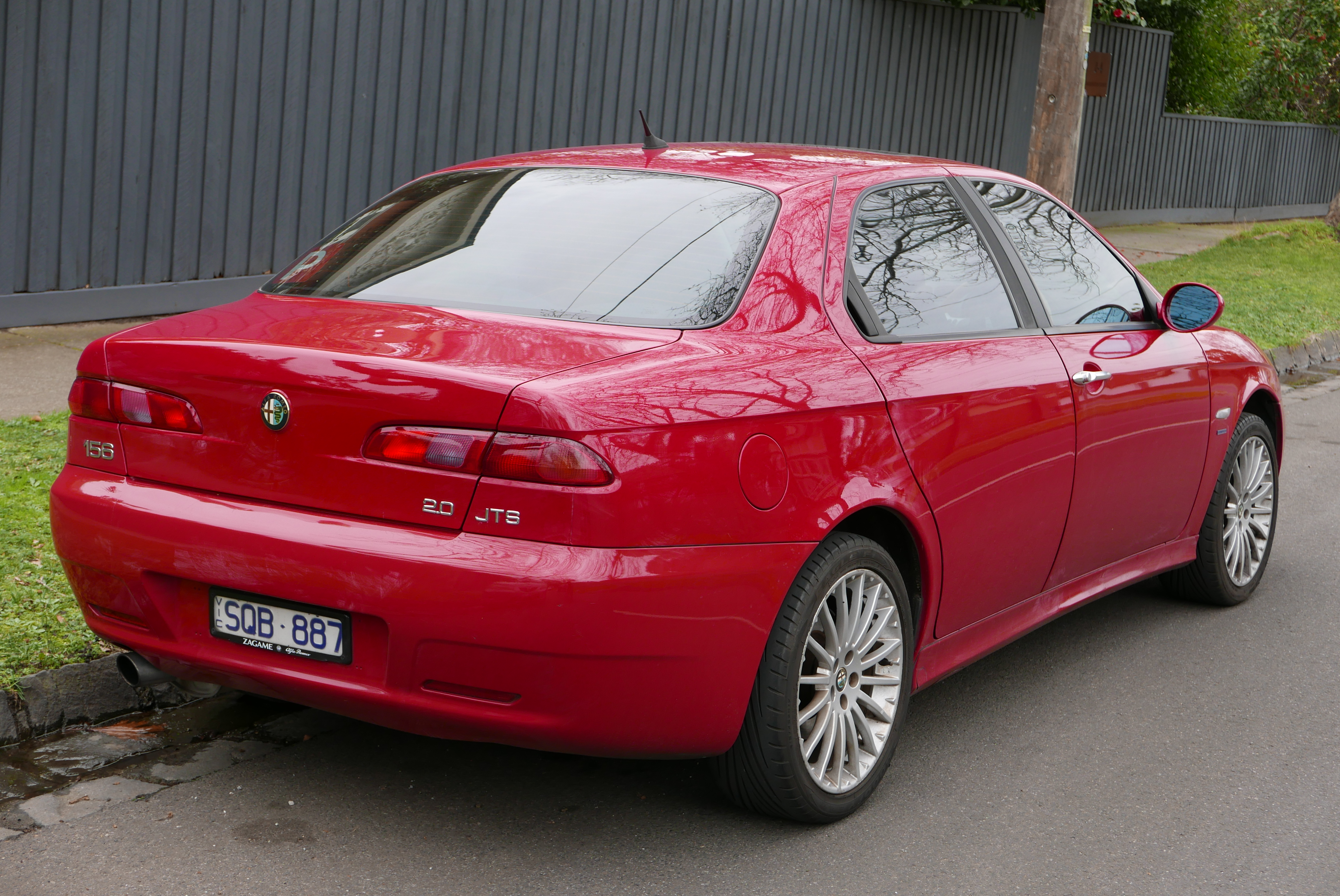
Rear (sedan)

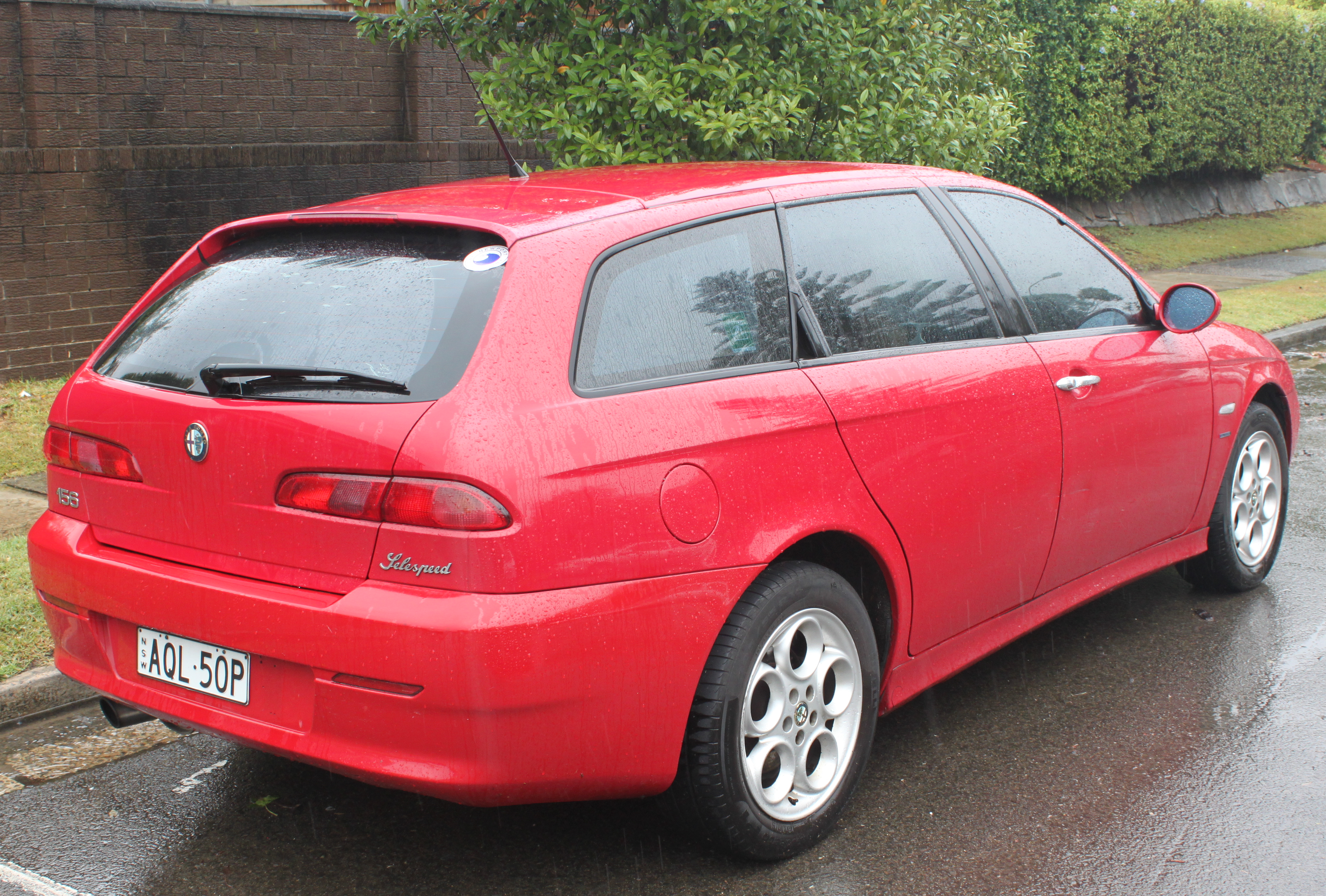
Rear (wagon)

== Variants ==
=== 156 GTA ===
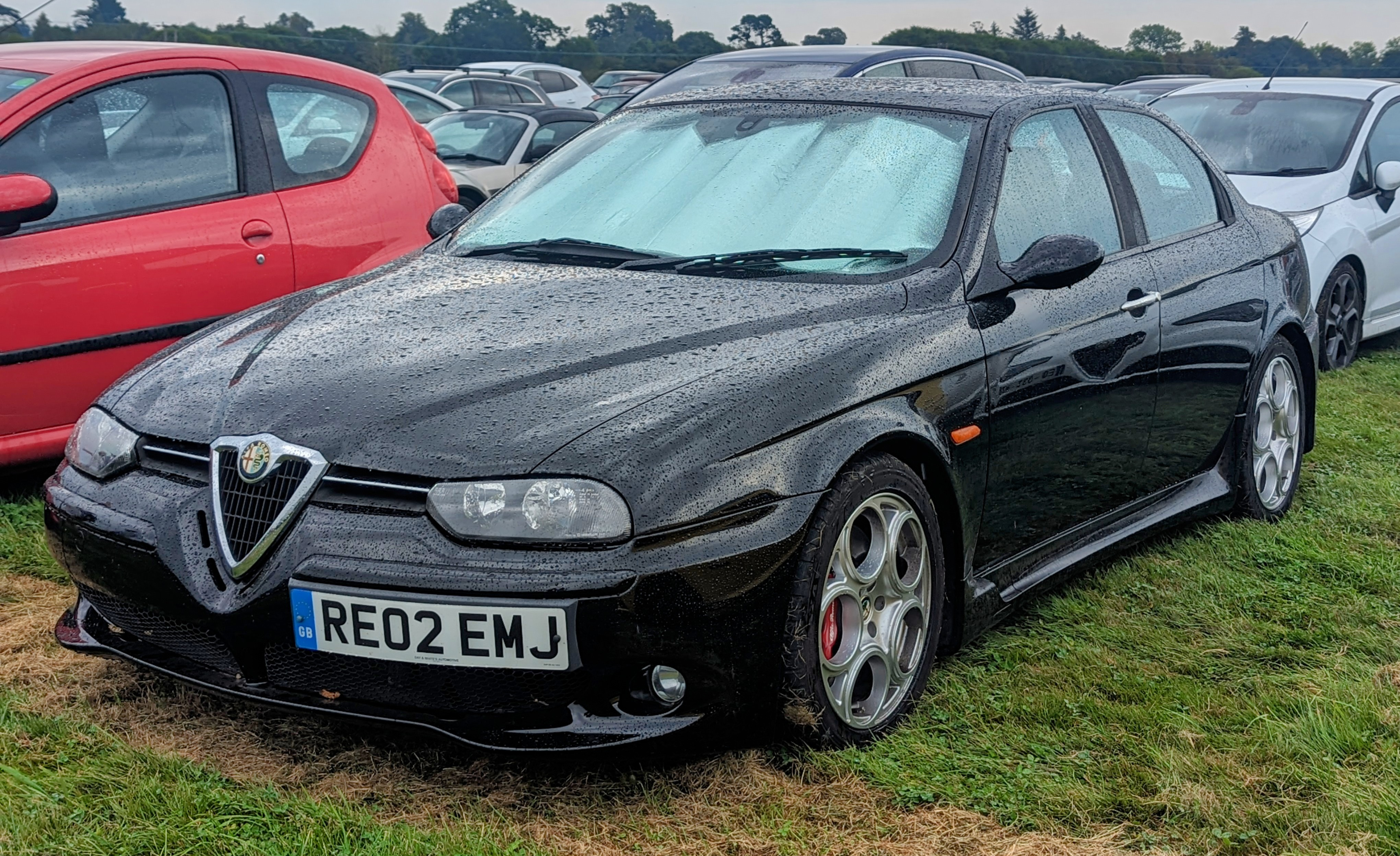
156 GTA sedan

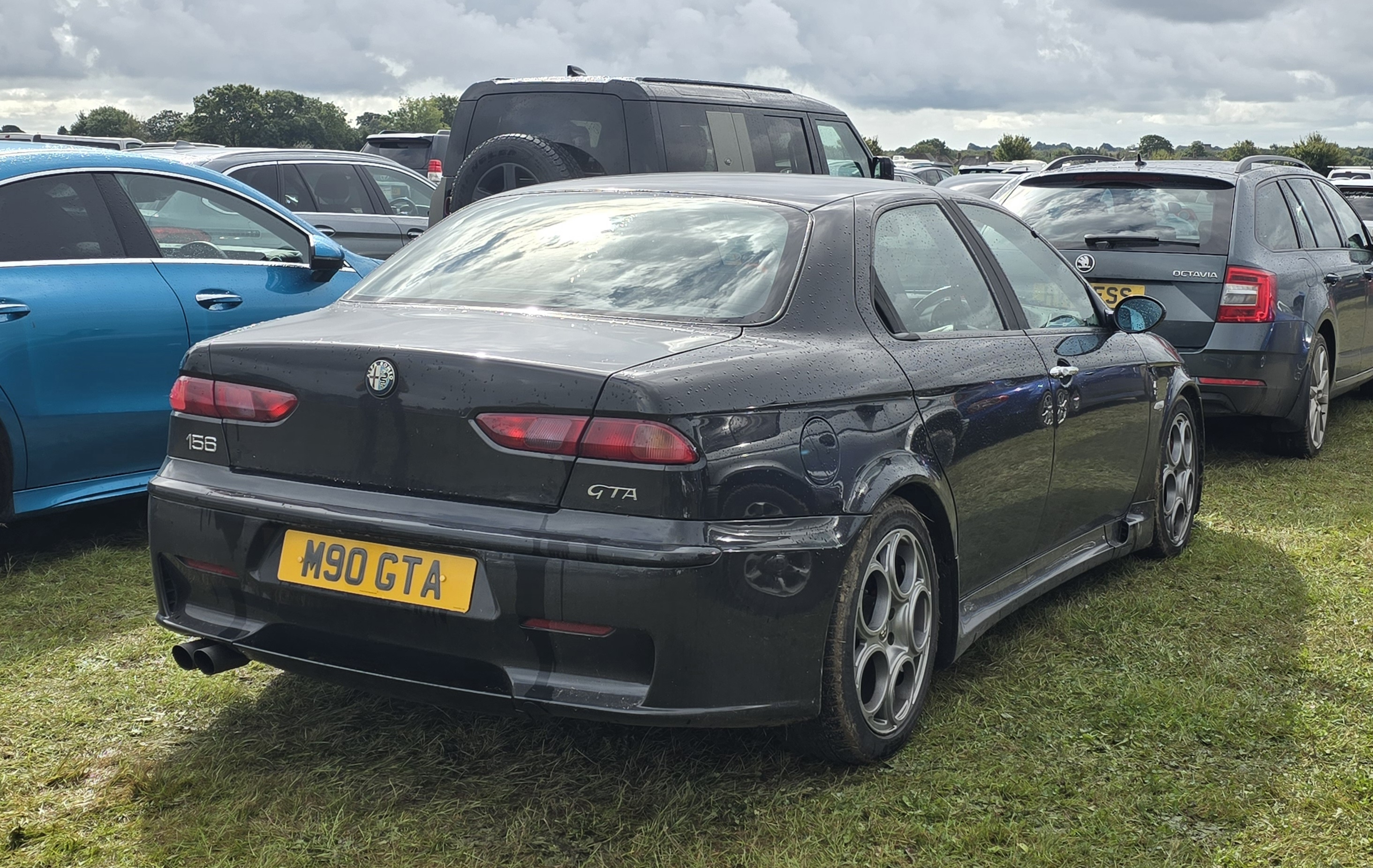
156 GTA sedan

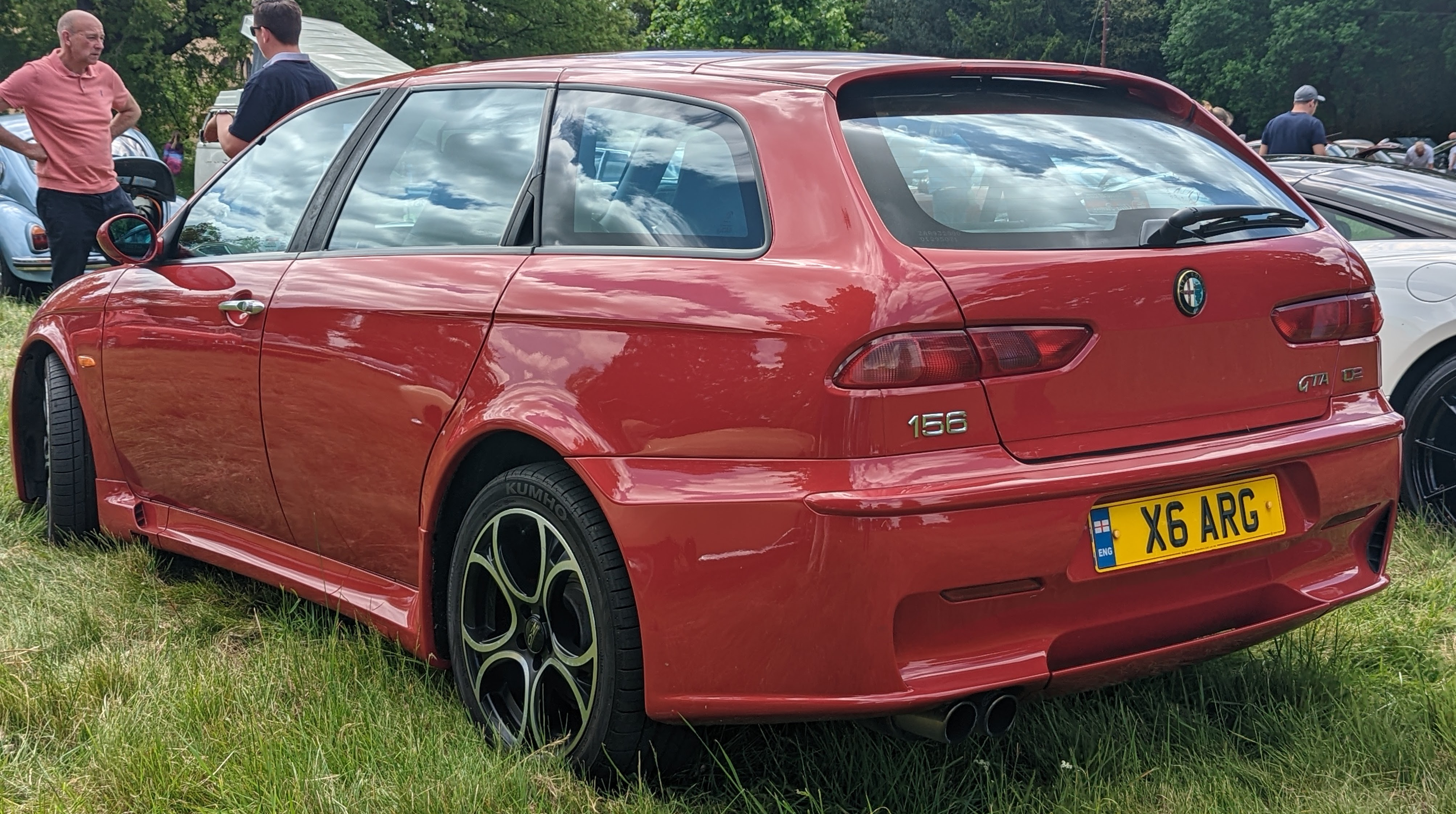
156 GTA station wagon

The 156 GTA and 156 Sportwagon GTA were launched at the Frankfurt Motor Show in September 2001. The GTA was named after the Alfa Romeo GTA from the 1960s, the letters GTA meaning Gran Turismo Alleggerita (English: lightened Grand Tourer). Developed alongside the 147 GTA, it was an exclusive high-performance model hand assembled on a dedicated production line separate to the standard 156 models.

Development of the GTA styling models and engineering design was entrusted in early 2000 to Stola with styling data provided by Centro Stile. Stola completed six prototypes that were further mechanically assembled by Alfa Romeo. Two of those protypes were presented at the Frankfurt Motor Show.

2,973 berlinas and 1,678 Sportwagons were built until the GTA production stopped in October 2005, as the V6 engine as unable to meet emissions regulations and due to the 156 being replaced by the 159. The GTA was sold in limited numbers, with right-hand drive vehicles holding a premium over left-hand drive vehicles due to their rarity.

The very first GTA was sold via online auction, from 13 to 23 September, the duration of the Frankfurt Motor Show. Winning bid was €48,691.26, which was donated to "Telethon" charity fund.

The 3.2-litre Bussone V6 engine (The big Busso, so-called after legendary Alfa Romeo engineer Giuseppe Busso). This engine is praised universally for its sound and revving capabilities. This was the largest iteration of the engine built by Alfa Romeo. The engine has a 93 mm (3.7 in) bore and a 78 mm (3.1 in) stroke, displacing at 3,179 cc (194.0 cu in). It was rated at 250 PS (184 kW; 247 hp) and 300 N⋅m (221 lbf⋅ft) of torque. Overall, the car weighed 55 kg (121 lb) more than the standard V6 156.

The GTA variants shared a common interior with post-facelift 156 variants. The doors, boot lid and bonnet were also shared. All else was unique to the GTA, with the engine specifically made by Fiat and Maserati Research Centres.

The GTA did not receive the Giugiaro designed facelift introduced on the 156 in 2003, but continued with the acclaimed Walter de Silva design to the very end of production.

The steering was also made faster, only 1.7 turns from lock to lock compared to 2.1 in normal models. The GTA had also larger brakes (Brembo), at front 305 millimetres (12.0 in) discs and rear 276 millimetres (10.9 in). The front discs were later upgraded to 330 millimetres (13 in) to cope with the performance potential.

=== 156 Sportwagon Q4 ===
In 2004 Sportwagon Q4, an all-wheel drive version of the Sportwagon was launched in some markets. The Q4 (short for Quadrifoglio 4) system used three differentials, the central one being of the Torsen C limited-slip type; it added about 150 kg (331 lb) to the vehicle weight. Graziano Trasmissioni, the Turin-based transmission specialist, developed this system. A raised ride height meant the Sportwagon Q4's was 1,458 mm (57.4 in) tall. Other than the ride height, special 5-spoke 17-inch wheels and a "Q4" badge on the tail set the Sportwagon Q4 apart from the front-wheel drive 156 versions. The Sportwagon Q4 was only available on LHD markets, with no RHD models being built or sold. The only available engine was the 1.9 M-Jet diesel with 150 PS (110 kW; 148 hp).

=== 156 Crosswagon Q4 ===
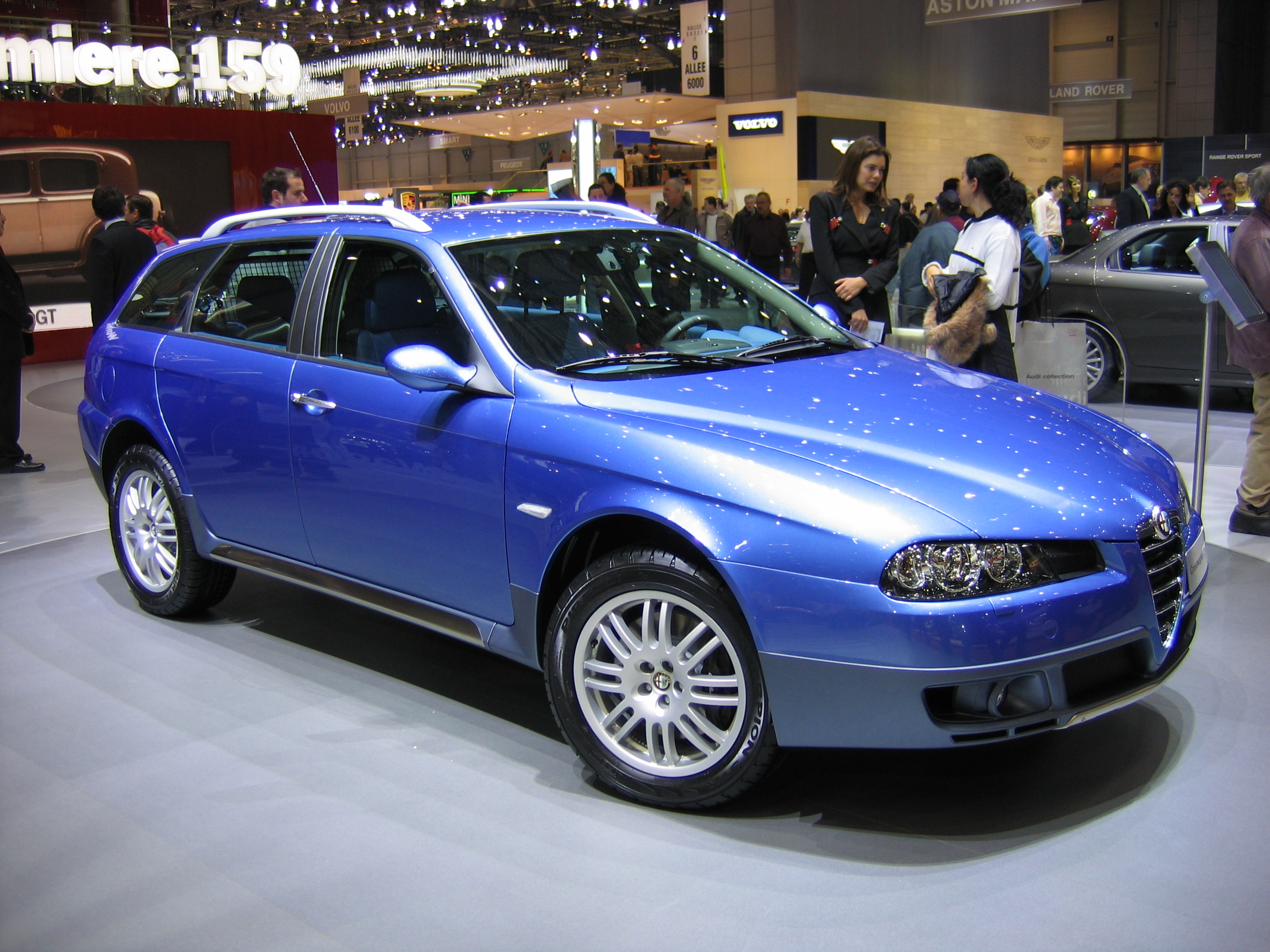
156 Crosswagon Q4

The Crosswagon Q4 was launched in 2004 with a crossover look and enhanced off-road capabilities. The Crosswagon's ride height was raised further compared to the Sportwagon Q4, giving the car better approach and departure angles; at 1,497 mm (58.9 in) it was 6.5 cm (2.6 in) taller than a standard 156. Tall-sidewall all-season tyres on 17 inch wheels were standard. The only available engine was 1.9 M-Jet diesel rated at 150 PS (110 kW; 148 hp). The Crosswagon was made to look more like an all-terrain vehicle by unique front and rear bumpers and door sills with steel inserts. After the introduction of the 159 in 2005 the Crosswagon remained in production, and in 2007 it was the last 156 model to be discontinued.

=== Special versions ===
External images
- 156 GTAm
- 156 Sportwagon GTA 3.5 Autodelta

==== Alfa Romeo 156 GTAm ====
The Alfa Romeo 156 GTAm was shown at the Bologna Motor Show in December 2002. The car was built by Fiat Group's partner N.Technology. The GTA 3,179 cc (3.2 L; 194.0 cu in) engine was bored to 3,548 cc (3.5 L; 216.5 cu in) and power was increased to 300 PS (221 kW). The car had widened wheel arches, 19 inch tyres and was equipped with N.Technology limited-slip differential. This car never reached production phase.

==== Alfa Romeo 156 Sportwagon GTA 3.5 Autodelta ====
At the 2004 Geneva Motor Show Italian-based tuning firm Autodelta unveiled a 156 Sportwagon prototype equipped with a 3,548 cc (3.5 L; 216.5 cu in) V6 engine that developed 300 PS (221 kW) at 6,800 rpm. The car was fitted with Bilstein adjustable shock absorbers, Eibach springs and Brembo front brakes with a diameter of 330 millimetres (13 in). Weight was reduced using a composite engine bonnet.

==== Autodelta 156 GTA 3.7 V6 ====
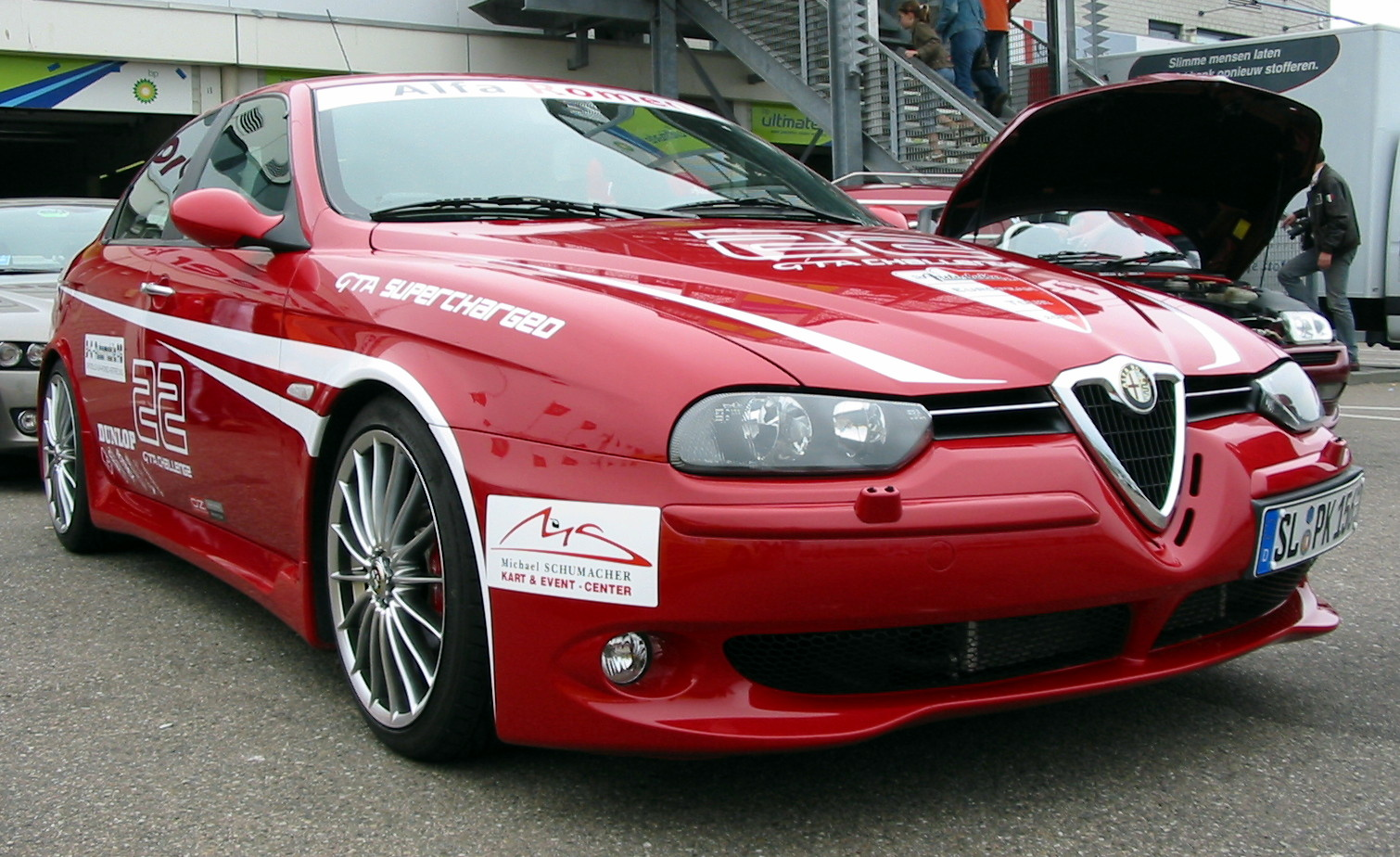
Supercharged Autodelta 156 GTA.

London-based tuning firm Autodelta made two high performance versions based on the 156 GTA: in the GTA AM version, the Alfa Romeo V6 engine was bored to 3,750 cc (3.8 L; 228.8 cu in), making it capable of 328 PS (241 kW) at 7,300 rpm. With this, the car could attain a top speed of 282 km/h (175.2 mph) and accelerate to 100 km/h in 5.2 s.

The GTA AM Super was an upgrade of the first version, now fitted with a Rotrex supercharger and rated at 400 PS (294 kW).

== Specifications ==
=== Platform and suspension ===
The 156 uses a platform derived from the Alfa Romeo 155, (together with Fiat Bravo/Brava/Marea), which in turn was derived from the Fiat Group's "Tipo" (Also known as C1) platform. However, it is sufficiently different from the original "Tipo" one to be seen as a new platform. This version of the C1 (Type 2) platform has significant modifications to its suspension, chassis, and rigidity, making it not a simple "clone" or "rebadge" of the Bravo/Brava. The 156 is a highly developed front-wheel drive car; (the Cross/Sportwagon Q4 offered four-wheel drive in left-hand drive markets) with a double high wishbone front suspension and updated version of MacPherson type rear suspension, which consists of a telescopic vertical strut with coaxial spring and two transverse links of different lengths and a longitudinal strut. This structure means that the rear wheels have a tiny passive steering ability. Weight saving materials (mainly aluminium) have been used in several parts both front and rear suspension.

For the 156 GTA, weight saving materials were also used in many other parts like magnesium framed front seats and dashboard frame. The 156 GTA only shared common parts with other 156 variants with respect to the facelift interior, doors, bonnet and boot lid.

=== Engines ===
The 156 offered various engines and power output choices during its lifespan, four and six cylinder petrol engines and four and five cylinder diesel engines, all produced at Pratola Serra except the V6 engines, which were produced at Alfa Romeo's Arese plant, with the GTA engines being produced at the Maserati Research Centre. The 2.4 JTD diesel was world's first common rail diesel engine in a passenger car.

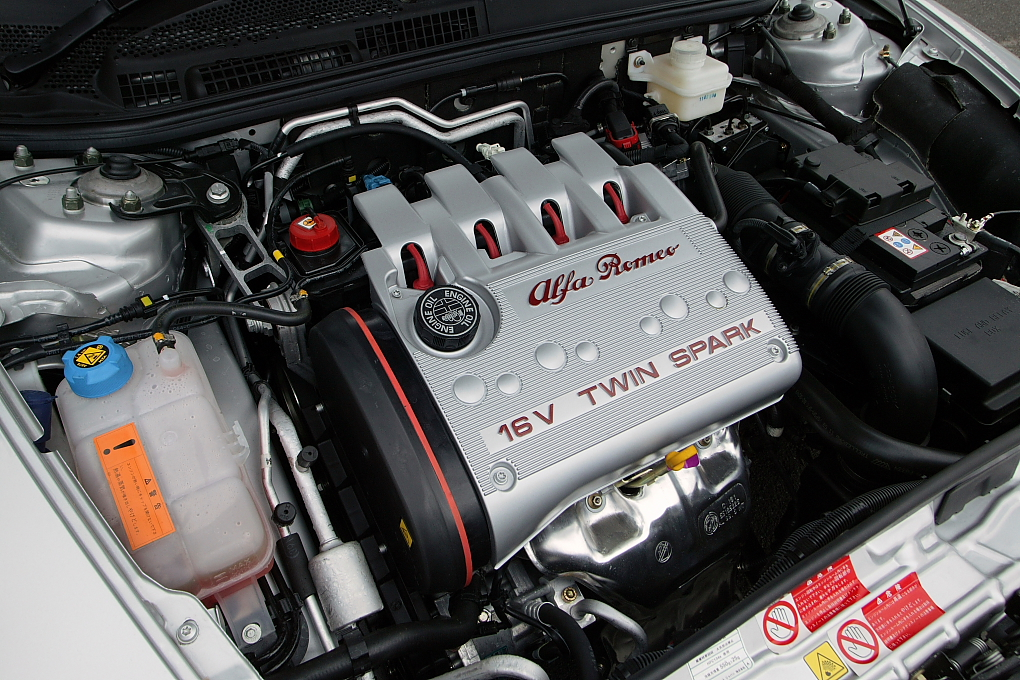
1.6 L Twin Spark (TS) engine

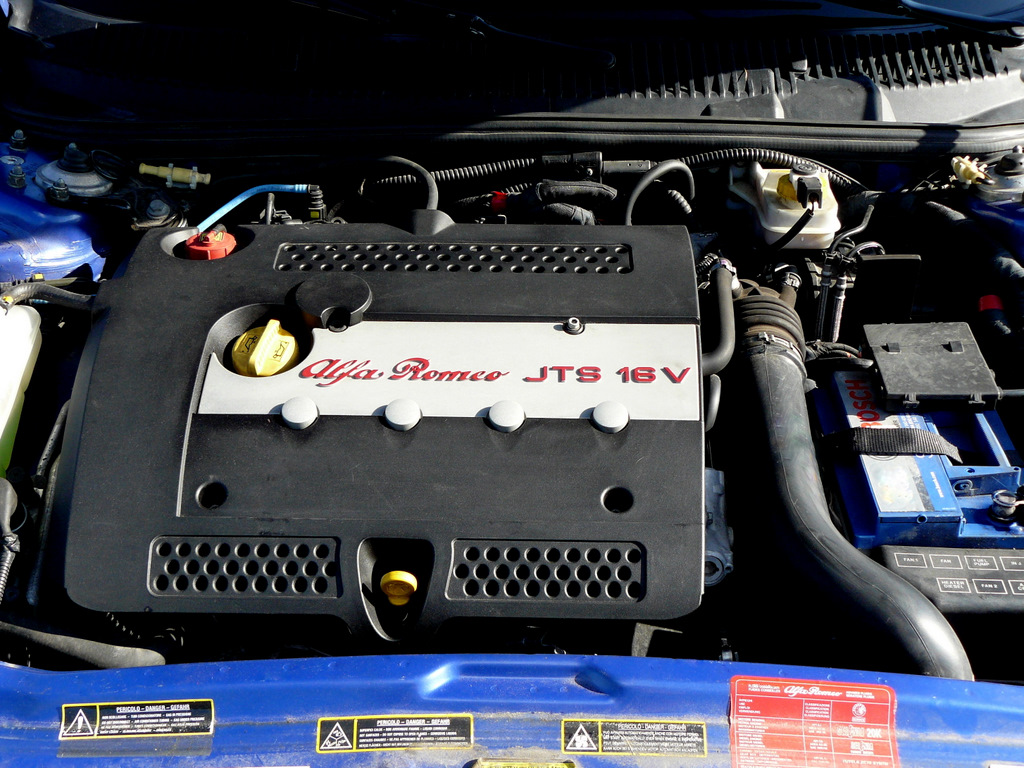
2.0 L JTS engine

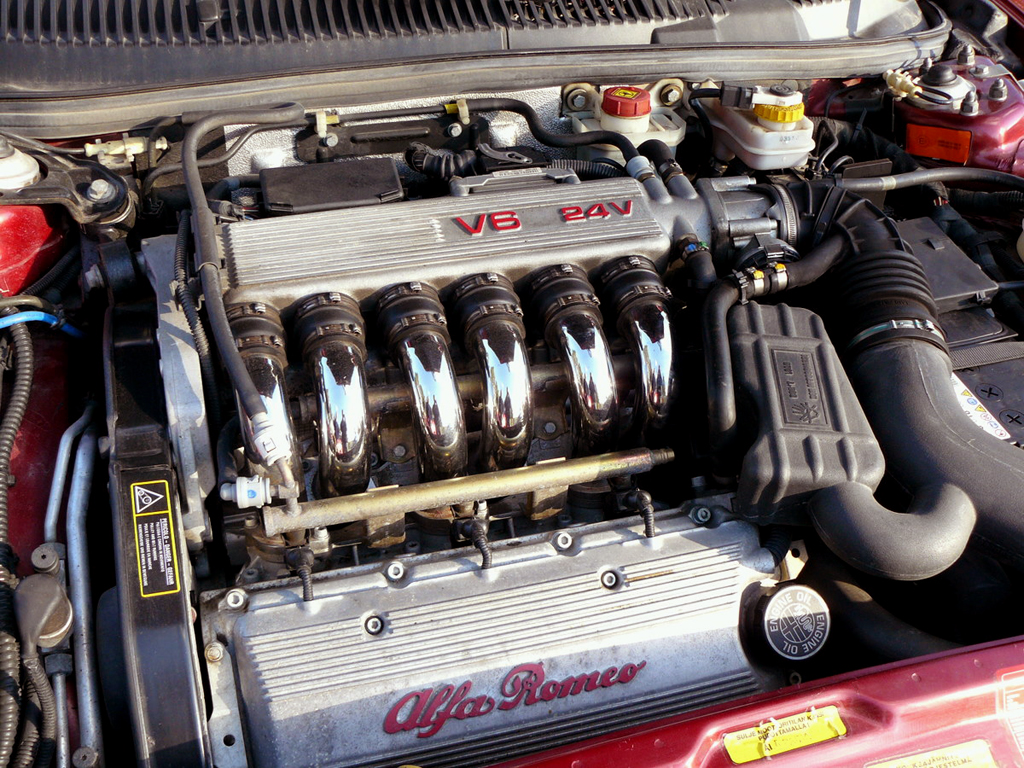
2.5 L V6 engine

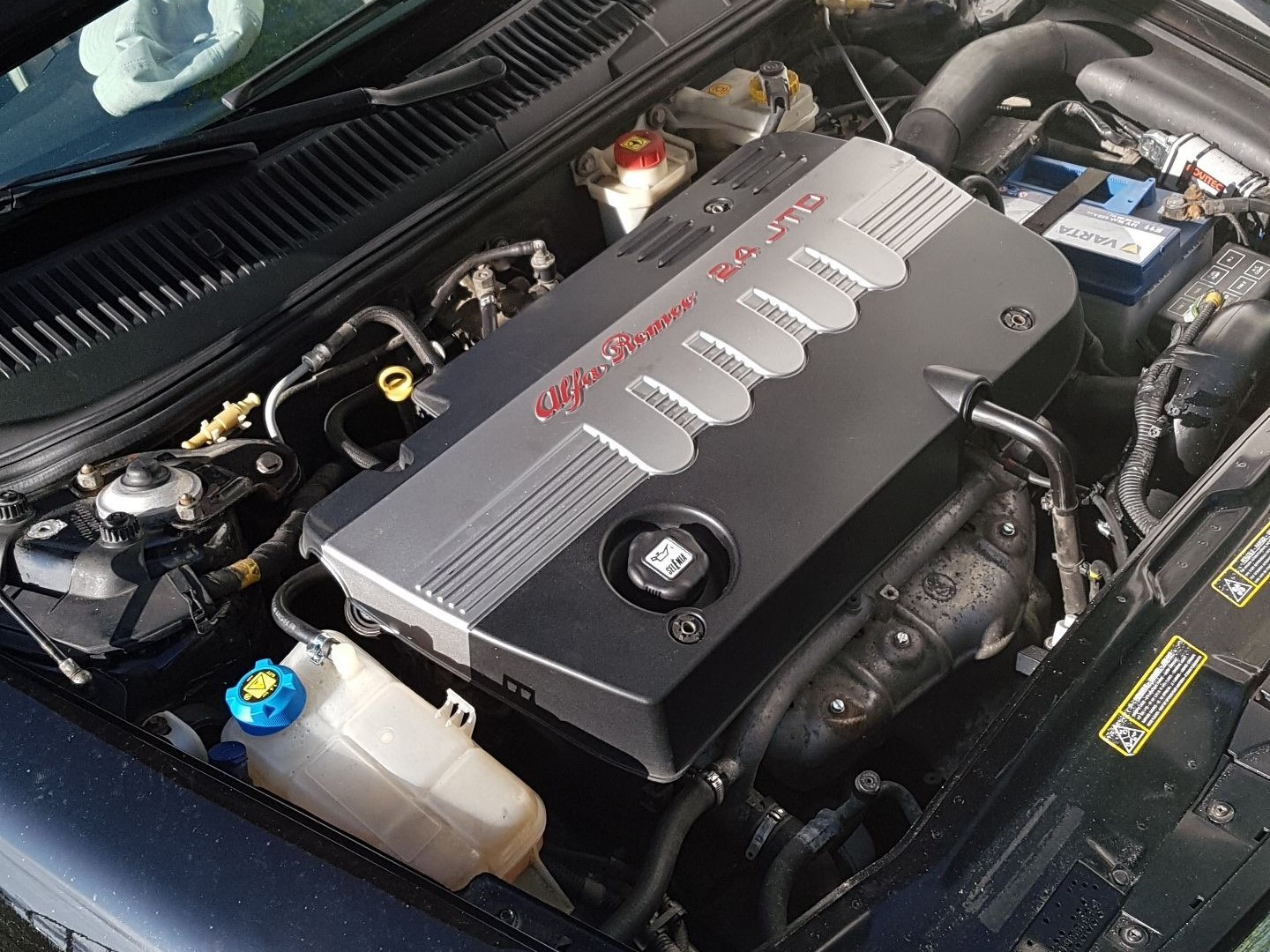
2.4 L JTD engine

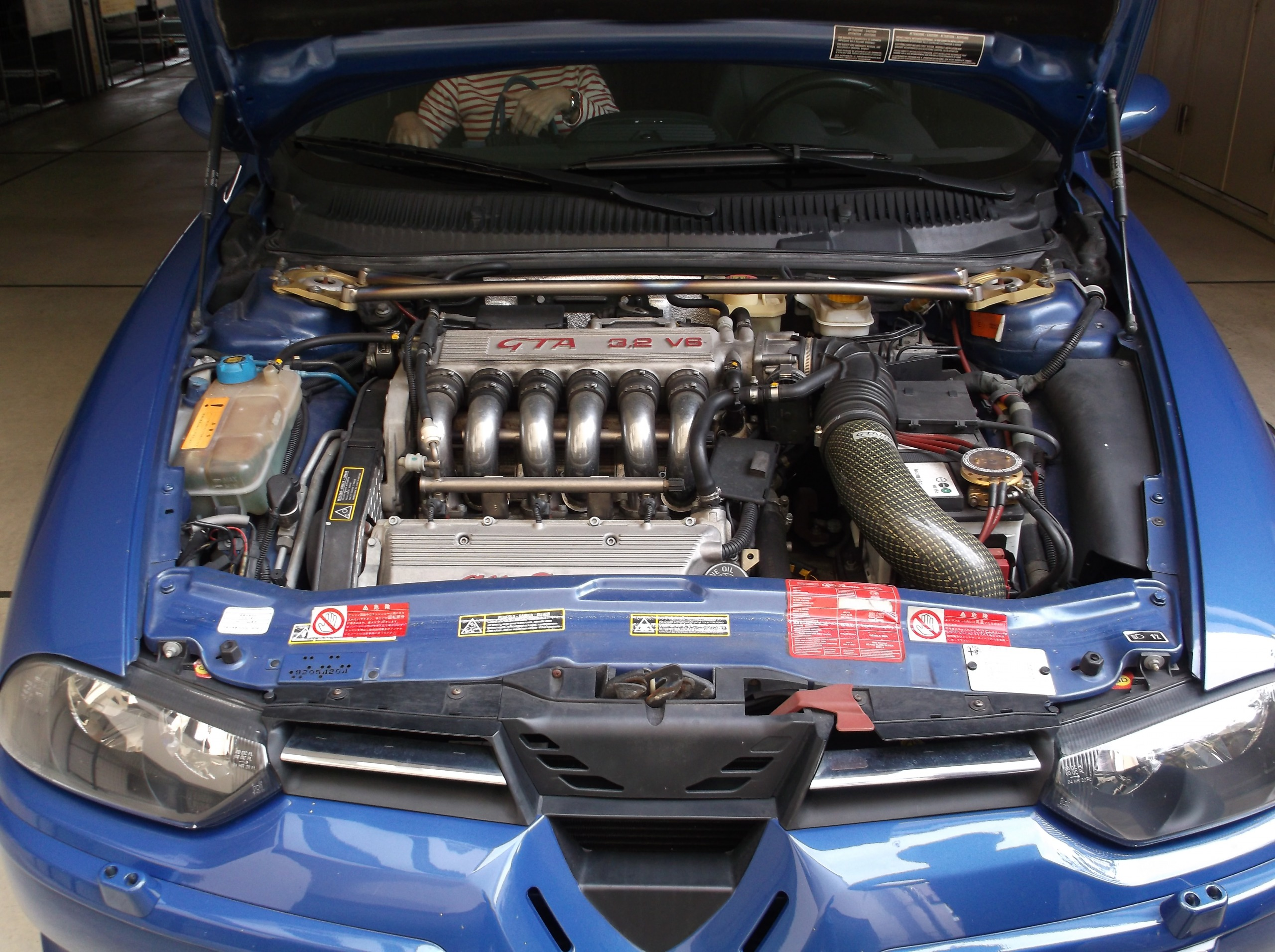
3.2 L V6 engine used in the GTA

Engine specifications
Model	Layout	Displacement	Valves	Max. power output	Peak torque	0–100 km/h 0–62 mph	Top speed	Years	Notes
Petrol engines
1.6 TS	I4 TS	1,598 cc (97.5 cu in)	16 DOHC VVT	120 PS (88 kW; 118 hp) at 6,300 rpm	144 N⋅m (106 lb⋅ft) at 4,500 rpm	10.5 s	200 km/h (124 mph)	1997–2006	
1.8 TS	I4 TS	1,747 cc (106.6 cu in)	16 DOHC VVT VLIM	144 PS (106 kW; 142 hp) at 6,500 rpm	169 N⋅m (125 lb⋅ft) at 3,500 rpm	9.3 s	210 km/h (130 mph)	1997–2000	Euro2
1.8 TS	I4 TS	1,747 cc (106.6 cu in)	16 DOHC VVT VLIM	140 PS (103 kW; 138 hp) at 6,500 rpm	163 N⋅m (120 lb⋅ft) at 3,900 rpm	9.4 s 9.7 s (SW)	208 km/h (129 mph)	2001–2006	Euro3
2.0 TS	I4 2BS TS	1,970 cc (120 cu in)	16 DOHC VVT VLIM	155 PS (114 kW; 153 hp) at 6,400 rpm	187 N⋅m (138 lb⋅ft) at 3,500 rpm	8.6 s	216 km/h (134 mph)	1997–2000	Euro2
2.0 TS	I4 2BS TS	1,970 cc (120 cu in)	16 DOHC VVT VLIM	150 PS (110 kW; 148 hp) at 6,300 rpm	181 N⋅m (133 lb⋅ft) at 3,800 rpm	8.8 s	214 km/h (133 mph)	2001–2002	Euro3
2.0 JTS	I4 2BS DI	1,970 cc (120 cu in)	16 DOHC VVT VLIM	165 PS (121 kW; 163 hp) at 6,400 rpm	206 N⋅m (152 lb⋅ft) at 3,250 rpm	8.2 s	220 km/h (137 mph)	2002–2006	Facelift
2.5 Q-System	V6	2,492 cc (152.1 cu in)	24 DOHC	190 PS (140 kW; 187 hp) at 6,300 rpm	222 N⋅m (164 lb⋅ft) at 5,000 rpm	8.5 s	227 km/h (141 mph)	1997–2000	Euro2
2.5 Q-System	V6	2,492 cc (152.1 cu in)	24 DOHC	192 PS (141 kW; 189 hp) at 6,300 rpm	218 N⋅m (161 lb⋅ft) at 5,000 rpm	8.5 s	227 km/h (141 mph)	2001–2006	Euro3
2.5 V6	V6	2,492 cc (152.1 cu in)	24 DOHC	190 PS (140 kW; 187 hp) at 6,300 rpm	222 N⋅m (164 lb⋅ft) at 5,000 rpm	7.3 s 7.4 s (SW)	230 km/h (143 mph)	1997–2000	Euro2
2.5 V6	V6	2,492 cc (152.1 cu in)	24 DOHC	192 PS (141 kW; 189 hp) at 6,300 rpm	218 N⋅m (161 lb⋅ft) at 5,000 rpm	7.3 s	230 km/h (143 mph)	2001–2006	Euro3
3.2 GTA	V6	3,179 cc (194.0 cu in)	24 DOHC	250 PS (184 kW; 247 hp) at 6,200 rpm	300 N⋅m (221 lb⋅ft) at 4,800 rpm	6.3 s	250 km/h (155 mph)	2002–2005	Euro3
Note: 2.0 TS, 2.0 JTS and GTA Selespeed versions have same performance statistics as manual transmission.
Diesel engines
1.9 JTD	I4	1,910 cc (117 cu in)	8 SOHC	105 PS (77 kW; 104 hp) at 4,000 rpm	255 N⋅m (188 lb⋅ft) at 2,000 rpm	10.4 s	188 km/h (117 mph)	1997–2000	
1.9 JTD	I4	1,910 cc (117 cu in)	8 SOHC	110 PS (81 kW; 108 hp) at 4,000 rpm	275 N⋅m (203 lb⋅ft) at 2,000 rpm	10.3 s	191 km/h (119 mph)	2000–2001	
1.9 JTD	I4	1,910 cc (117 cu in)	8 SOHC	115 PS (85 kW; 113 hp) at 4,000 rpm	275 N⋅m (203 lb⋅ft) at 2,000 rpm	10.3 s 10.7 s (SW)	191 km/h (119 mph)	2001–2006	Facelift
1.9 M-Jet	I4	1,910 cc (117 cu in)	16 DOHC	140 PS (103 kW; 138 hp) at 4,000 rpm	305 N⋅m (225 lb⋅ft) at 2,000 rpm	9.3 s	209 km/h (130 mph)	2002–2006	
1.9 M-Jet	I4	1,910 cc (117 cu in)	16 DOHC	150 PS (110 kW; 148 hp) at 4,000 rpm	305 N⋅m (225 lb⋅ft) at 2,000 rpm	9.1 s 9.5 s (SW)	212 km/h (132 mph)	2004–2007	(*)
2.4 JTD	I5	2,387 cc (145.7 cu in)	10 SOHC	136 PS (100 kW; 134 hp) at 4,200 rpm	310 N⋅m (229 lb⋅ft) at 2,000 rpm	9.5 s	203 km/h (126 mph)	1997–2000	
2.4 JTD	I5	2,387 cc (145.7 cu in)	10 SOHC	140 PS (103 kW; 138 hp) at 4,000 rpm	304 N⋅m (224 lb⋅ft) at 1,800 rpm	9.4 s	205 km/h (127 mph)	2000–2001	
2.4 JTD	I5	2,387 cc (145.7 cu in)	10 SOHC	150 PS (110 kW; 148 hp) at 4,000 rpm	305 N⋅m (225 lb⋅ft) at 1,800 rpm	9.4 s	212 km/h (132 mph)	2002–2003	Facelift
2.4 M-Jet	I5	2,387 cc (145.7 cu in)	20 DOHC	175 PS (129 kW; 173 hp) at 4,000 rpm	385 N⋅m (284 lb⋅ft) at 2,000 rpm	8.3 s 8.6 s (SW)	225 km/h (140 mph)	2003–2006	Second facelift
Note (*): Crosswagon Q4 topspeed is 192 km/h (119 mph) and acceleration 0–100 km/h (62,5 mph) is 10.5 seconds, for Sportwagon Q4 numbers are 200 km/h (124 mph) and 10.2 seconds.

== Awards ==
In 1998, an international jury of 56 journalists (40 of whom voted for the 156) representing 21 countries awarded the Alfa 156 the European Car of the Year award; it was described as having a "very refined suspension layout so to offer an impeccable roadholding". The 2.5 V6 engine was awarded with the International Engine of the Year award in 2000. The 156 has won more than 35 awards, including:

- Technical Innovation Award – Common Rail 1998 – (Autocar – Great Britain)
- Best Compact Executive 1998 – (What Car? – Great Britain)
- Best Compact Executive Car 1998 – (Auto Express – Great Britain)
- Die Besten Autos 1998, Paul Pietsch Preis – Innovation prize for Common Rail, (Auto, Motor und Sport – Germany)
- Auto 1 Europa 1998 – (panel of engineers, drivers, and journalists from the eleven European magazines, headed by Auto Bild)
- Auto Trophy 1998 – (Auto Zeitung – Germany)
- Trophee Du Design 1998 – (Automobile Magazine – France)
- European Award for Automotive Design – (Belgium, 1998)
- Car of the Year 1998 in Denmark, Spain, Netherlands, Luxembourg, Germany, Portugal, France, and Croatia
- Car of the Year in South Africa 1999 – (South African Guild of Motoring Journalists)
- Prix de l’Innovation Technique pour le Common Rail 1997 (France)
- L’automobile più bella del mondo ("The most beautiful car in the world") 1997 (Italy)

== Motorsport ==
The 156 competed in various motor racing championships including the World Touring Car Championship, European Touring Car Championship and the British Touring Car Championship. The 156 touring car program was run by Fiat Group's partner N.Technology S.p.A., founded as Nordauto Squadra Corse, to compete in the Italian Touring Car Championship. In 1994, the name was changed to Nordauto Engineering, and to N.Technology in 2001.

In 1998, the 156 Group N version was offered for sale to the public. The 156 Group N had no carpets, seats or upholstery, but included additional track safety devices.

The following titles have been won by 156 drivers:

- 1998 Italian Super Touring Car Championship - Alfa Romeo 156 D2, Fabrizio Giovanardi
- 1999 Italian Super Touring Car Championship - Alfa Romeo 156 D2, Fabrizio Giovanardi
- 2000 European Super Touring Car Cup Winner - Alfa Romeo 156 D2, Fabrizio Giovanardi
- 2000 South American Super Touring Car Championship, Oscar Larrauri
- 2001 FIA European Touring Car Championship - Alfa Romeo 156 D2, Fabrizio Giovanardi
- 2002 FIA European Touring Car Championship - Alfa Romeo 156 GTA Super 2000, Fabrizio Giovanardi
- 2003 FIA European Touring Car Championship - Alfa Romeo 156 GTA Super 2000, Gabriele Tarquini
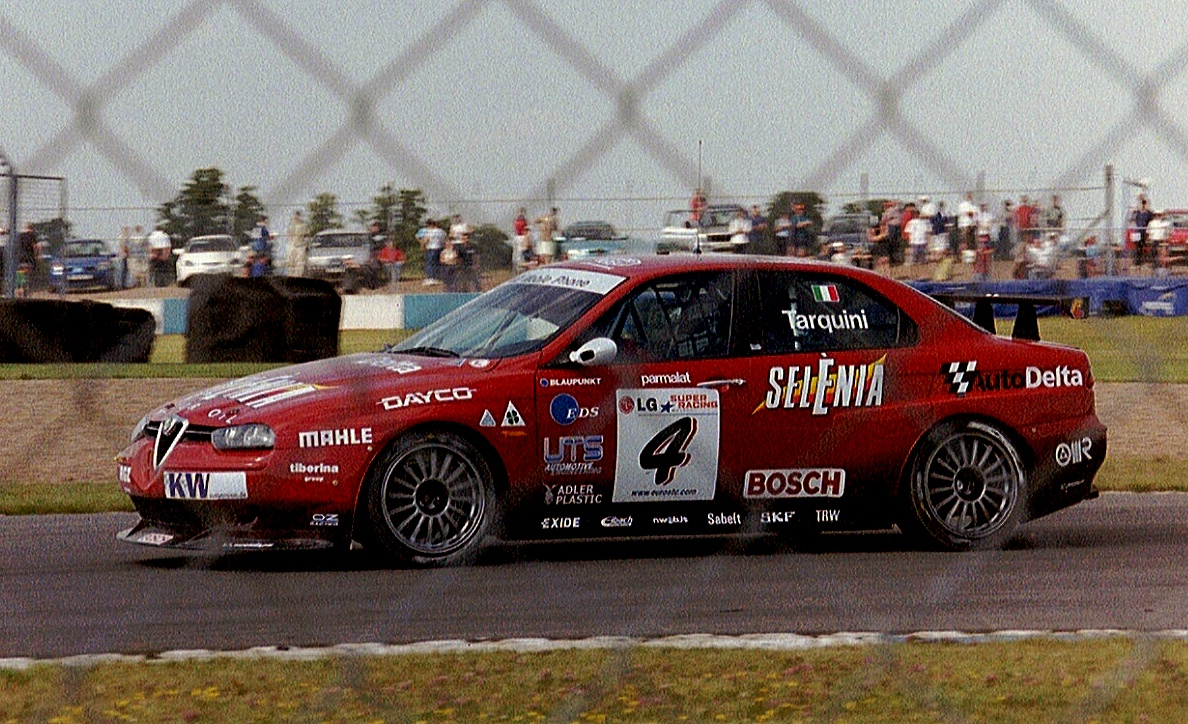
GTA Racing Team Nordauto Alfa Romeo 156 GTA, Gabriele Tarquini in Donington Park 2003 ETCC

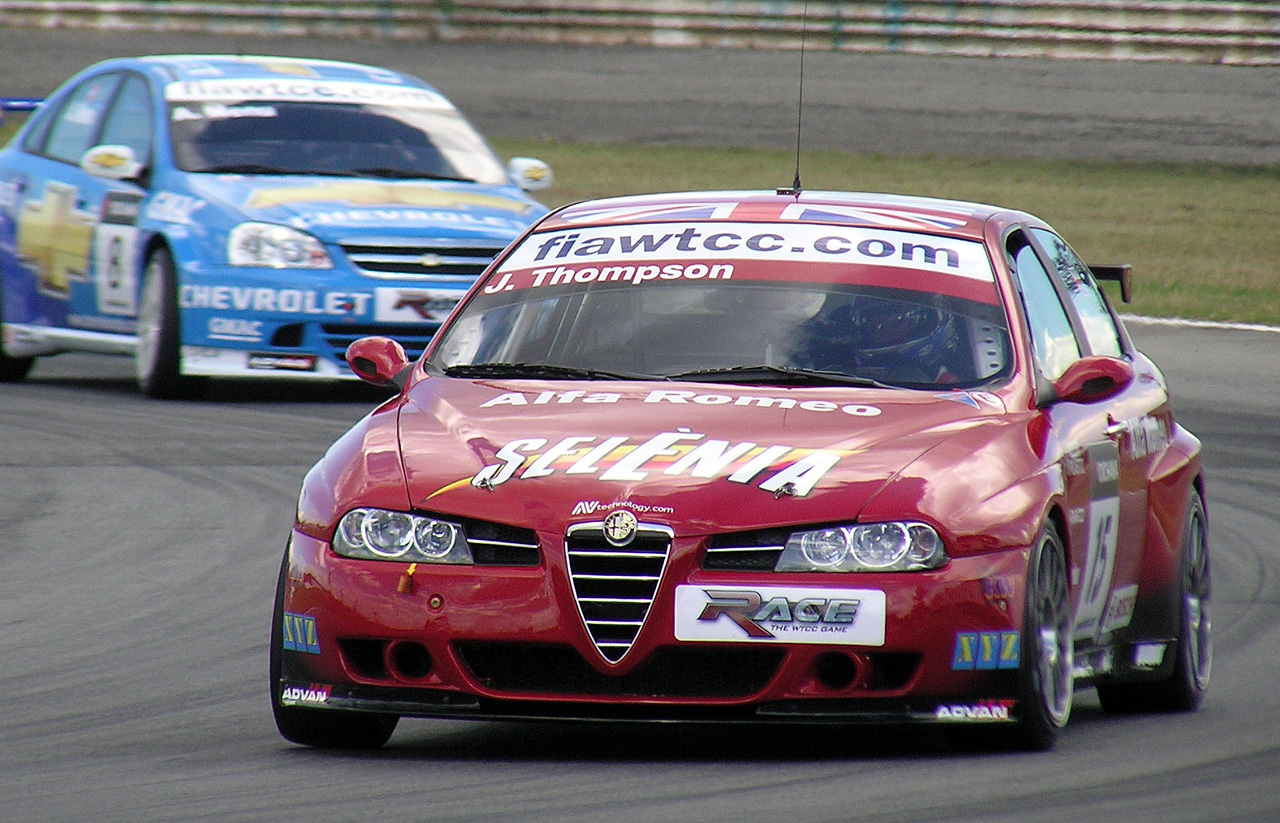
A 156, driven by N.Technology driver James Thompson, during the Curitiba round of the 2007 World Touring Car Championship

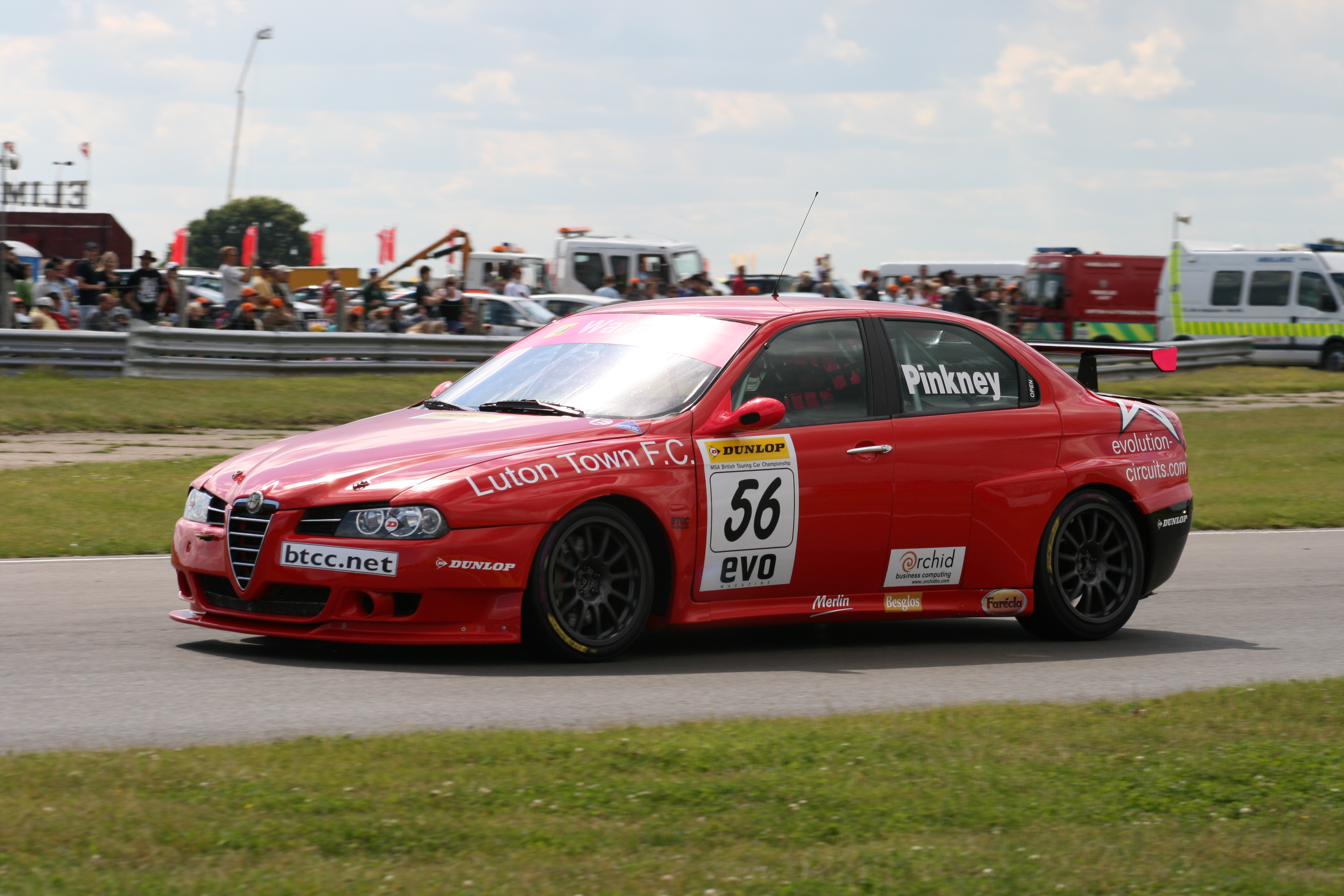
David Pinkney driving a 156 at the Snetterton round of the 2007 British Touring Car Championship

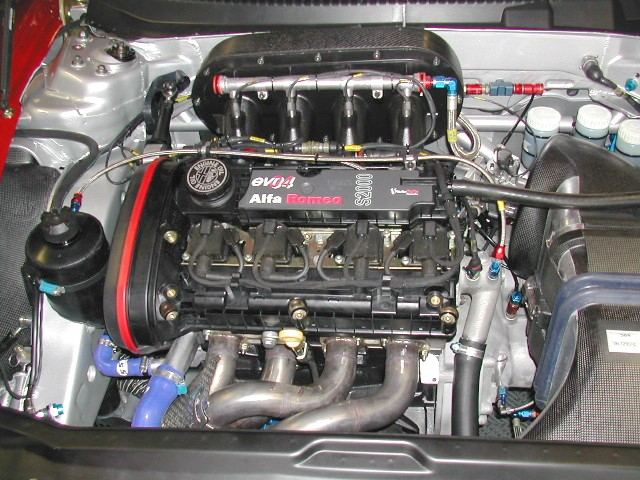
The Alfa Romeo straight-4 Twin Spark racing engine used in 156 in the European Touring Car Championship

Specifications for touring car versions:

Model	Displacement	Max. power output
Alfa Romeo 156 D2	1,997 cc (121.9 cu in)	310 PS (228 kW; 306 hp) at 8,200 rpm
Alfa Romeo 156 GTA Super 2000	1,998 cc (121.9 cu in)	260 PS (191 kW; 256 hp) at 8,450 rpm
Alfa Romeo 156 Super 2000	1,998 cc (121.9 cu in)	275 PS (202 kW; 271 hp) at 8,450 rpm

=== Coloni S1 Alfa Romeo 156 ===
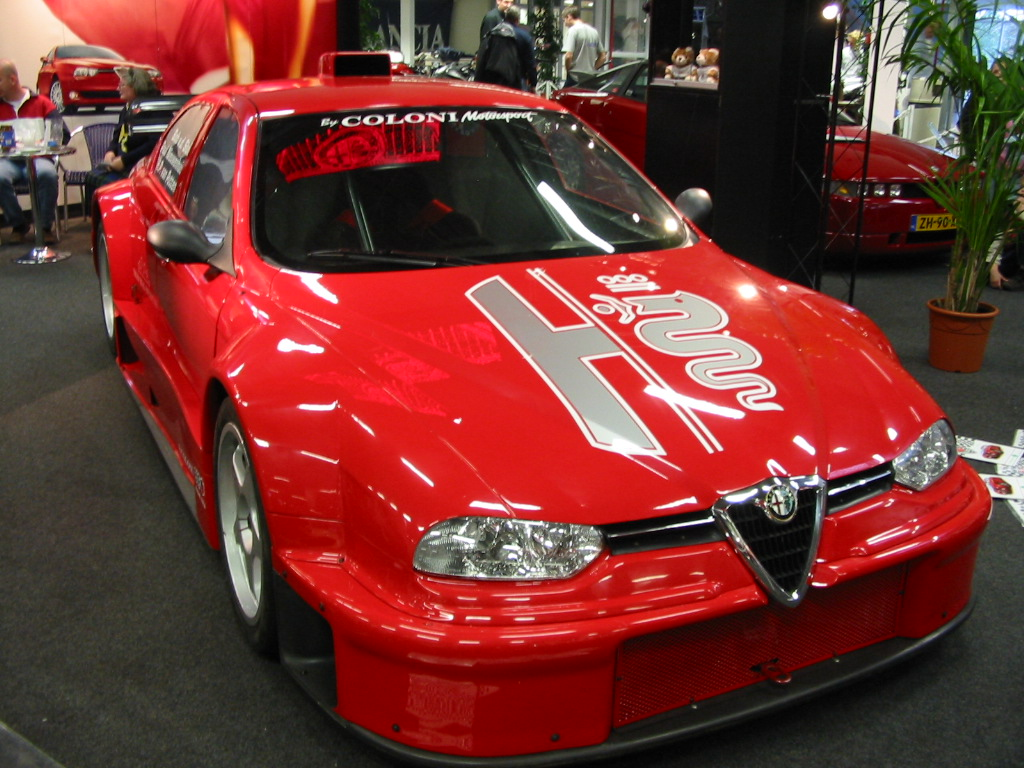
Alfa Romeo 156 Coloni

Italian race car constructor Coloni made a one-off racing car prototype for FIA Group-E Formula Libre called the Coloni S1 Alfa Romeo 156, or 156 Maxiturismo. The car is a carbon fibre silhouette racing car on a tubular frame, powered by a 3.0-litre Alfa Romeo V6 engine rated between 380 and 500 hp (280 and 370 kW). The car has a 6-speed Hewland-Coloni sequential gearbox and weighs around 900 kilograms (2,000 lb). It is capable of attaining speeds of over 310 kilometres per hour (190 mph).
