= Luraghi =

Luraghi is an Italian surname. Notable people with the surname include:

- Giuseppe Luraghi (1905–1991), Italian lyricist and engineer
- Nino Luraghi (born 1964), Italian ancient historian
- Raimondo Luraghi (1921–2012), Italian historian and university teacher
