= Autodelta =

Alfa Romeo's competition department

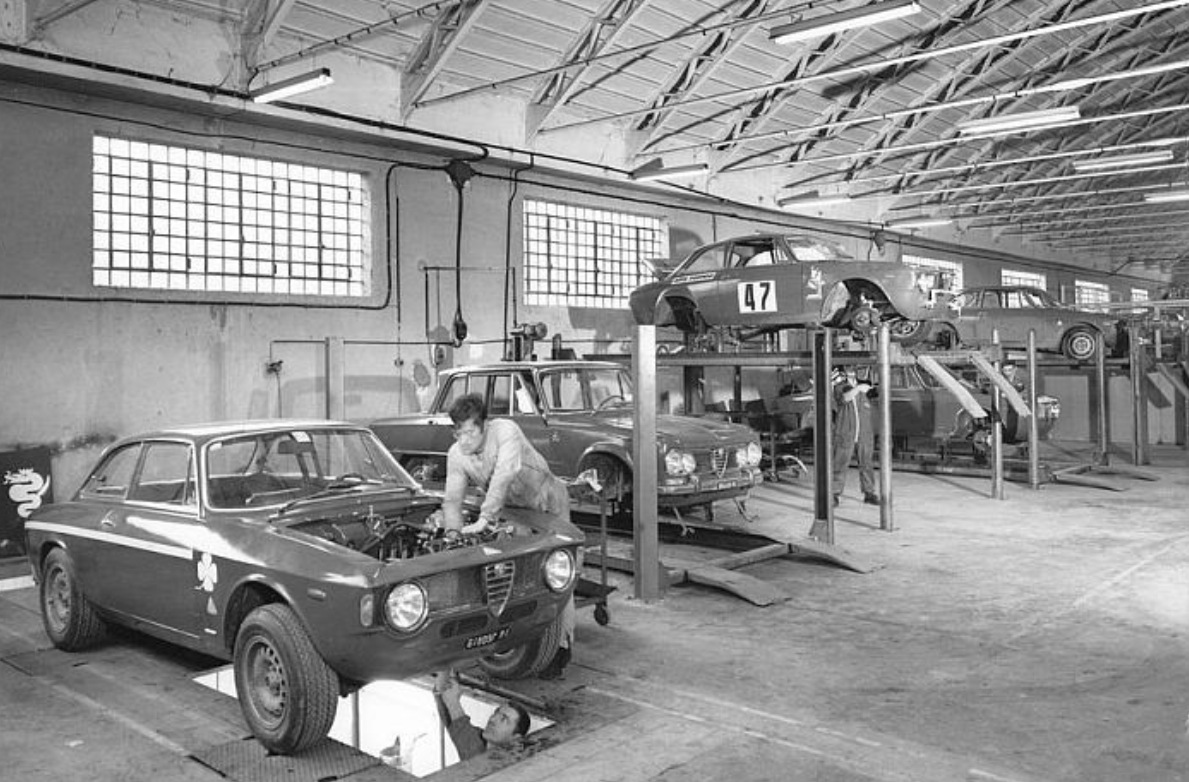
Inside the factory around 1965 with a GTA

Autodelta SpA was the name of Alfa Romeo's competition department. Established in 1961 as Auto-Delta by Carlo Chiti and Lodovico Chizzola, former Alfa Romeo and Ferrari engineers, the company was officially made a department of Alfa Romeo on March 5, 1963 by the then president of Alfa Romeo Giuseppe Luraghi. Originally based in Feletto Umberto, Udine, the team subsequently moved closer to Alfa Romeo's facilities in Settimo Milanese in 1964, officially becoming Autodelta SpA. The move enabled Autodelta to use the Circuito di Balocco test track for new racing cars and prototypes.

The purpose of the company was bringing Alfa Romeo back to the top level of motor racing after Alfa Romeo's success ended in the early 1950s. The first car jointly developed by Alfa Romeo and Autodelta was the Giulia TZ in June 1962. The TZ was updated to TZ2 in 1965, with both cars taking many wins in various touring car championships. Alfa Romeo and Autodelta would later introduce the GTA.

After success in grand tourer racing, Chiti persuaded Alfa Romeo to develop sportscars for the World Sportscar Championship, from 1967 onwards. Alfa Romeo built 2.0, 2.5 and 3.0 litre V8 engines, and later a flat-12 for the various Tipo 33 racing cars. This racing program led to Alfa Romeo winning the constructors championships in 1975 and 1977. Autodelta manufactured a road going version of the Tipo 33, the Alfa Romeo 33 Stradale between 1967 and 1969.

After winning the sportscar championships, Alfa Romeo turned to supplying engines to the Brabham Formula One team and eventually returned to the sport with a factory team in 1979, run by Autodelta. The team also prepared Alfa Romeo rally cars such as the Alfetta GTVs.

In 1984 Chiti left Alfa Romeo to establish Motori Moderni. Although the division was eventually phased out, Alfa Romeo continued to use the Autodelta name again for their AutoDelta Squadra Corse team in the European Touring Car Championship run by N.Technology.

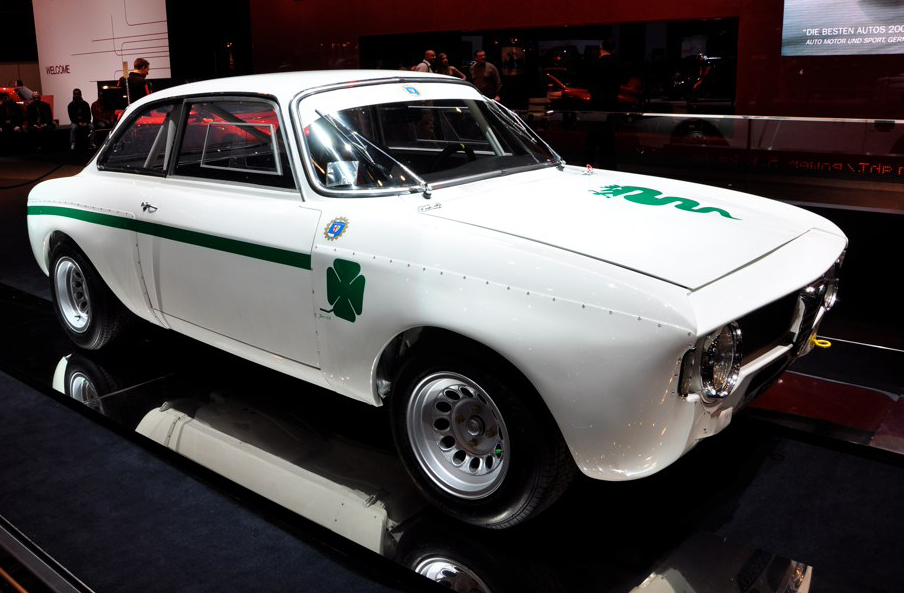
Alfa Romeo GTA 1300 Junior, original Autodelta 1966.

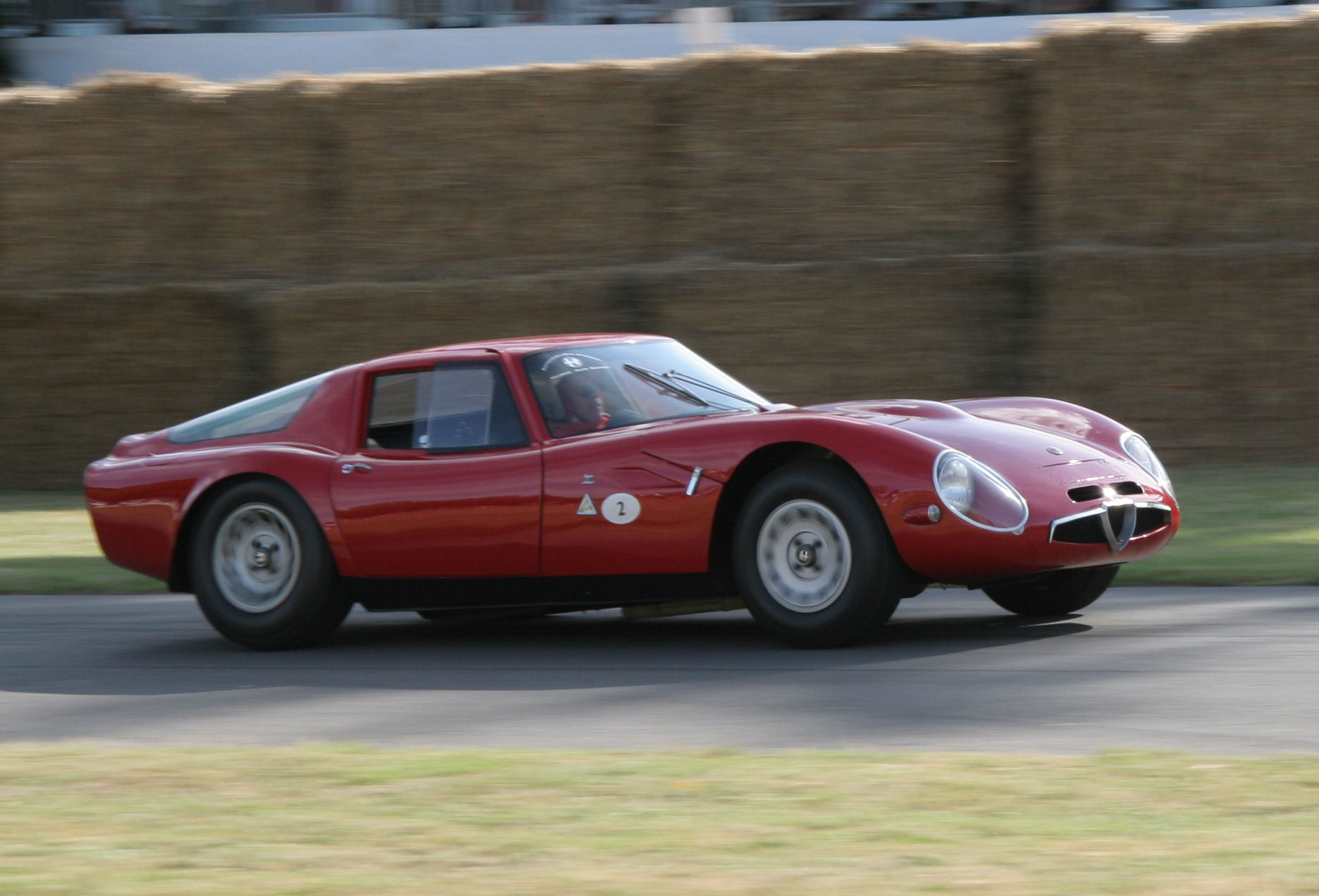
The "Giulia TZ2" from 1965, one of the most famous achievements of Autodelta.

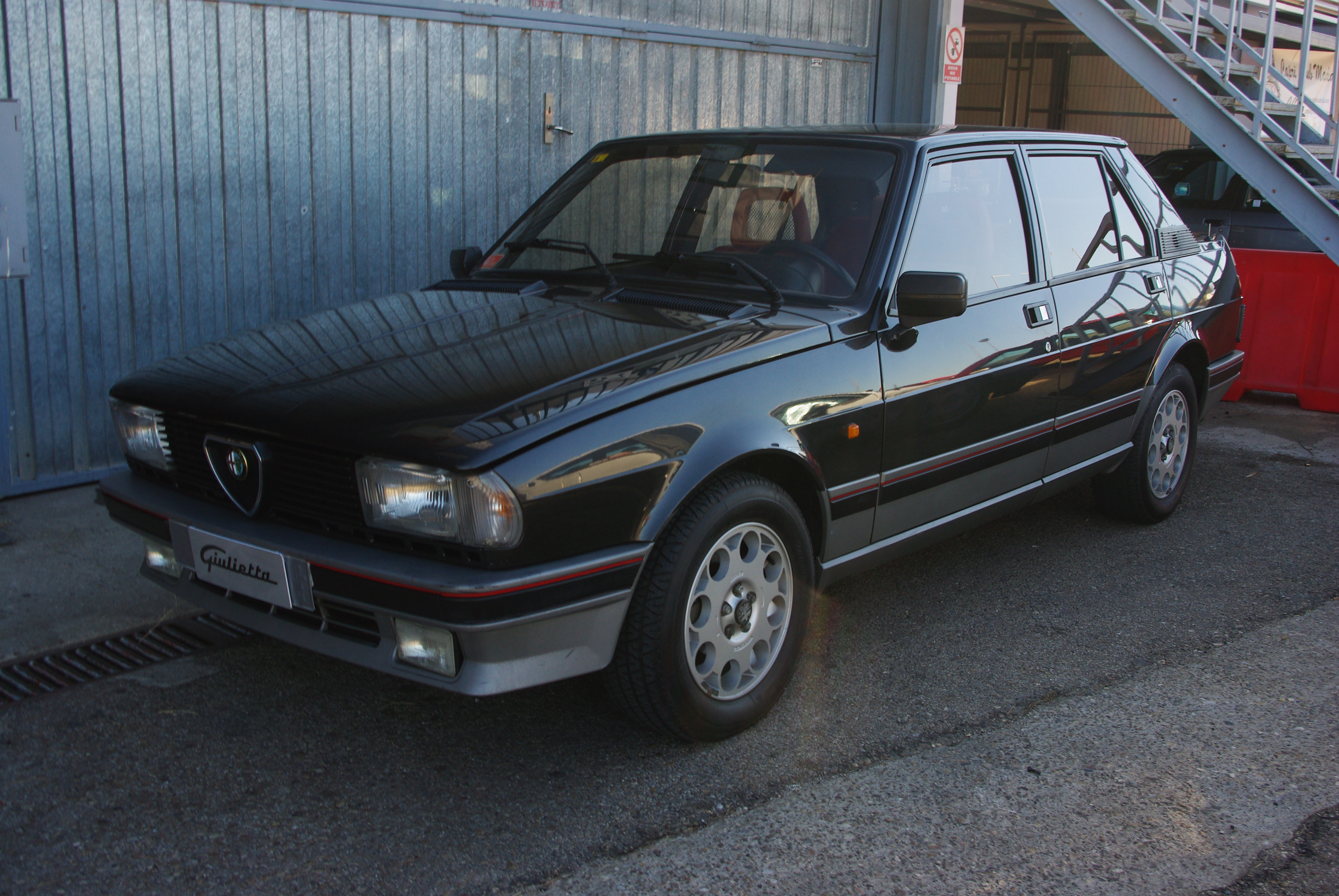
Alfa Romeo Giulietta Turbo, the last Autodelta car.

== Race results ==
=== Victories in the sports car world championship ===
Year	Race	Car	Driver 1	Driver 2
1971	1000 km Brands Hatch	Alfa Romeo T33/3	(France) Henri Pescarolo	(Italy) Andrea de Adamich
1971	Targa Florio	Alfa Romeo T33/3	(Italy) Nino Vaccarella	(Netherlands) Toine Hezemans
1971	6 Hours of Watkins Glen	Alfa Romeo T33/3	(Sweden) Ronnie Peterson	(Italy) Andrea de Adamich
1974	1000 km Monza	Alfa Romeo 33TT12	(Italy) Arturo Merzario	(United States) Mario Andretti
1977	Dijon 500km	Alfa Romeo 33SC12	(Italy) Arturo Merzario	(France) Jean-Pierre Jarier
1977	Monza 500km	Alfa Romeo 33SC12	(Italy) Vittorio Brambilla	(France) Jean-Pierre Jarier
1977	Vallelunga 400km	Alfa Romeo 33SC12	(Italy) Vittorio Brambilla	(Italy) Spartaco Dini
1977	Coppa Florio	Alfa Romeo 33SC12	(Italy) Arturo Merzario	None
1977	Estoril 2.5h	Alfa Romeo 33SC12	(Italy) Arturo Merzario	None
1977	Le Castellet 500km	Alfa Romeo 33SC12	(Italy) Arturo Merzario	(France) Jean-Pierre Jarier
1977	Imola 250km	Alfa Romeo 33SC12	(Italy) Vittorio Brambilla	None
1977	Salzburgring 300km	Alfa Romeo 33SC12	(Italy) Vittorio Brambilla	None

== See also ==
- Alfa Romeo in motorsport
- Alfa Romeo in Formula One
- Alfa Corse
