= Orazio Satta Puliga =

Italian automobile designer (1910–1974)

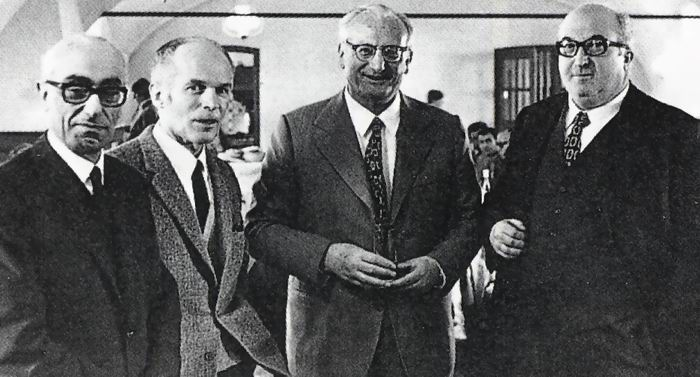
Alfa Romeo engineers. From left, Orazio Satta Puliga, Giuseppe Busso, Giuseppe Luraghi and Carlo Chiti.

Orazio Satta Puliga (October 6, 1910 – March 22, 1974) was an Italian automobile designer of Sardinian ancestry known for several Alfa Romeo designs.

== Biography ==
He was born in Turin. He graduated in mechanical engineering from the Polytechnic University of Turin in 1933 and again in aeronautical engineering in 1935. After completing his military service in 1938, he joined Alfa Romeo, working under the direction of Wifredo Ricart. Satta followed Ricart as head of design (1946), overseeing the 158 and 159, Alfa Romeo 1900, Alfa Romeo Giulietta, Alfa Romeo Giulia, Alfa Romeo Montreal and Alfa Romeo Alfetta. He later became central director (1951) and finally general vice president (1969–1973), before retiring due to brain cancer.

The design of the 1900, Giulietta, Giulia, 1750, Alfetta, and their derivatives is attributed to him and other engineers under his direction: Giuseppe Busso, Rudolf Hruska, Filippo Surace, and Domenico Chirico, to name a few.

Alfisti owe their interest in Alfa Romeo vehicles to these engineers, who developed and constructed them with technical standards in mind.

Struck by an incurable illness, he died in Milan in 1974. In 2007, the town of Ozieri, where his family came from, named a street after him, thanks in part to the local Ferrari Club, which promoted the initiative. In 2010, on the occasion of Alfa Romeo's centenary, the Sardinian Vintage Car Association brought around thirty historic Alfa cars to Ozieri to commemorate his work.
