= Carlo Chiti =

Italian engineer and car designer (1924–1994)

Carlo Chiti in 1974

Carlo Chiti (19 December 1924 – 7 July 1994) was an Italian racing car and engine designer best known for his long association with Alfa Romeo's racing department. He also worked for Ferrari and was involved in the design of the Ferrari 156 Sharknose car, with which Phil Hill won the 1961 championship.

== Early life ==
Born in Pistoia, Tuscany, Chiti graduated with a degree in aeronautical engineering from the University of Pisa in Italy in 1953.

== Alfa Romeo ==
Chiti joined Alfa Romeo in 1952 when still a student. He joined a design and engineering team supervised by Orazio Satta Puliga, and worked in collaboration with senior members such as Rudolf Hruska and Giuseppe Busso. His first job was the design of the Alfa Romeo 3000 CM sports car. When Alfa Romeo's competition department was closed down in the mid-1950s, Chiti was invited to replace designer and engineer Andrea Fraschetti at Scuderia Ferrari.

== Ferrari ==
Chiti (left) with Enzo Ferrari at Monza

At Ferrari, Chiti was involved with the design of the 1958 championship winning car Ferrari 246 F1 together with Vittorio Jano. Mike Hawthorn secured the Drivers' Championship and the team finished second behind Vanwall in the newly-born Constructors' Championship. In 1961, Chiti designed the Ferrari 156 Sharknose car, with which Phil Hill won the championship and earned the team its maiden Constructors' Championship. During his tenure at Ferrari, Chiti also mentored a new generation of aspiring designers who had begun a period of apprenticeship at the team, including Mauro Forghieri and Giampaolo Dallara. In 1962, following a disagreement with Enzo Ferrari, Chiti, Giotto Bizzarrini and other senior figures left the company.

== Automobili Turismo e Sport ==
Chiti, Bizzarrini and Romolo Tavoni were subsequently invited by Giovanni Volpi to join the breakaway ATS Formula One team, which had employed a number of disaffected ex-Ferrari personnel, including drivers Phil Hill and Giancarlo Baghetti. The ATS project was not successful and in 1964 Chiti re-entered competitive motor racing through a new project, Autodelta.

== Return to Alfa Romeo ==
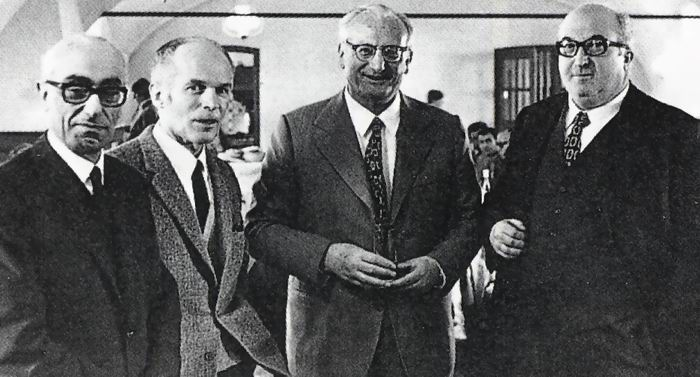
Alfa Romeo engineers. From left, Orazio Satta Puliga, Giuseppe Busso, Giuseppe Luraghi and Chiti

Autodelta enabled Chiti to rekindle his association with Alfa Romeo, for whom he designed a V8 and then a flat-12 engine for their Alfa Romeo Tipo 33 sportscars. These were eventually successful, winning the 1975 World Championship for Makes and 1977 World Championship for Sports Cars. At this time, Chiti became involved in Formula One again, through the Brabham team, who signed an agreement with Alfa Romeo to use Chiti's engines. There was some success – Niki Lauda won two races in a Brabham BT46 with the Alfa engine in the 1978 Formula One season. Brabham designer Gordon Murray persuaded Chiti to produce a V12 engine to allow ground effect to be exploited by the team. However, during the 1979 Formula One season, mutual dissatisfaction with the partnership prompted Brabham's owner Bernie Ecclestone to return to Ford and Chiti to start developing a Formula One Alfa Romeo car. The Alfa Romeo/Brabham partnership was terminated before the end of the season.

The Alfa Romeo Formula One project started with some promise but was never able to recapture the glory days of the marque in the 1950s. The team achieved two pole positions, with Bruno Giacomelli leading much of the 1980 United States Grand Prix before retiring with electrical trouble. Tragedy also occurred when Patrick Depailler was killed testing for the 1980 German Grand Prix at the Hockenheimring. The team's best season was 1983, when Chiti designed a turbocharged 890T V8 engine, and Alfa Romeo achieved 6th place in the constructors' championship, largely thanks to two second-place finishes for Andrea de Cesaris.

== Motori Moderni ==
In 1984 Chiti left Alfa Romeo to set up another company, Motori Moderni which concentrated on producing engines for Formula One. Initially, the company produced a V6 turbo design, used briefly by Minardi and Automobiles Gonfaronnaises Sportives. However, the underfunded operation meant the engines were not competitive. When the banning of turbos from Formula One was announced, Chiti designed a new 3.5 litre atmospheric flat-12 engine. This was eventually taken up by Subaru, who badged it for use in their brief and completely unsuccessful entry into Formula One with the tiny Coloni team in the 1990 Formula One season.

== Later life ==
Carlo Chiti died in 1994 in Milan.

In 1999, Koenigsegg bought blueprints, machining tools and the patent for an unused 4-litre Chiti-designed Formula One flat-12 engine.

== Sources ==
- www.grandprix.com
- www.gpracing.net192.com
- www.historicracing.com
- FORIX.com: Grand Prix engine designers
