= Giuseppe Busso =

Italian automotive engineer (1913–2006)

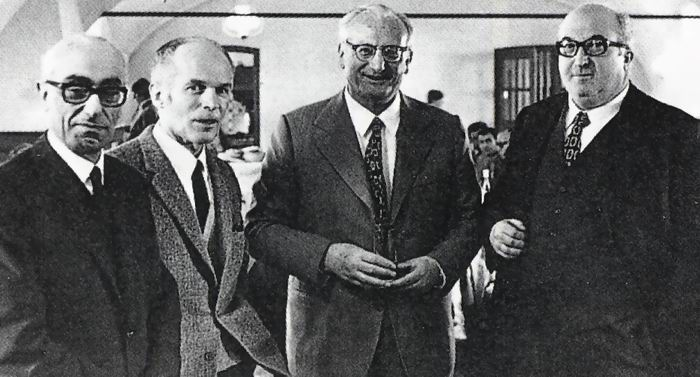
Alfa Romeo engineers. From left, Orazio Satta Puliga, Giuseppe Busso, Giuseppe Luraghi and Carlo Chiti.

Giuseppe Busso (Turin, April 27, 1913 – Arese, January 3, 2006) was an Italian mechanical and engine designer mostly known for his tenure at Alfa Romeo and Ferrari.

== Biography ==
Busso was born in Turin. After graduating in Industrial Design at the Polytechnic University of Turin, in 1937 he began working for Fiat's aviation engine department. In January 1939 he moved to Alfa Romeo where he worked under the guidance of Orazio Satta Puliga. His main responsibility was racing car engines.

In 1946 he became technical director for Ferrari and thus took part in the development of the Ferrari Colombo V12 engine. Busso returned to Alfa Romeo in 1948 and worked there until 1977. He was in charge of mechanical engineering for Alfa Romeo road cars, taking part in the creation of the Alfa Romeo 1900, Giulietta, Giulia, 1750, 2000 and Alfetta. With the Giulietta, Busso introduced the four cylinder Alfa Romeo Twin Cam engine, also known as the Nord engine. Another creation of his was the Alfa Romeo V6 engine, also known as the Busso engine, which was designed in the early 1970s and introduced in the 1979 Alfa 6.

He died in 2006 in Arese, Milan, three days after his V6 engine was put out of production.
