= Giuseppe Luraghi =

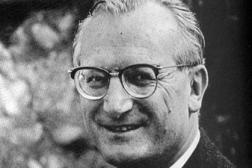
- Born: Giuseppe Eugenio Luraghi

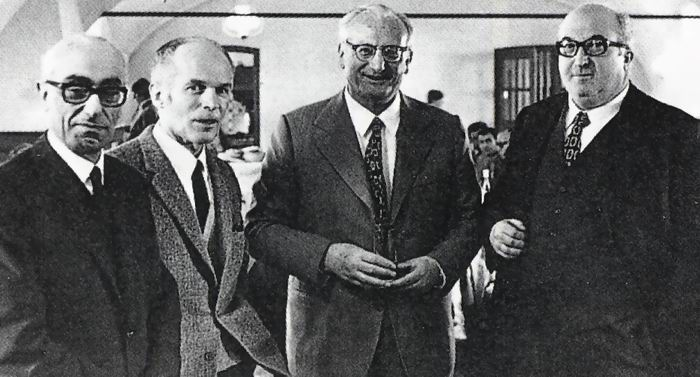
With Alfa Romeo engineers. From left, Orazio Satta Puliga, Giuseppe Busso, Giuseppe Luraghi and Carlo Chiti.

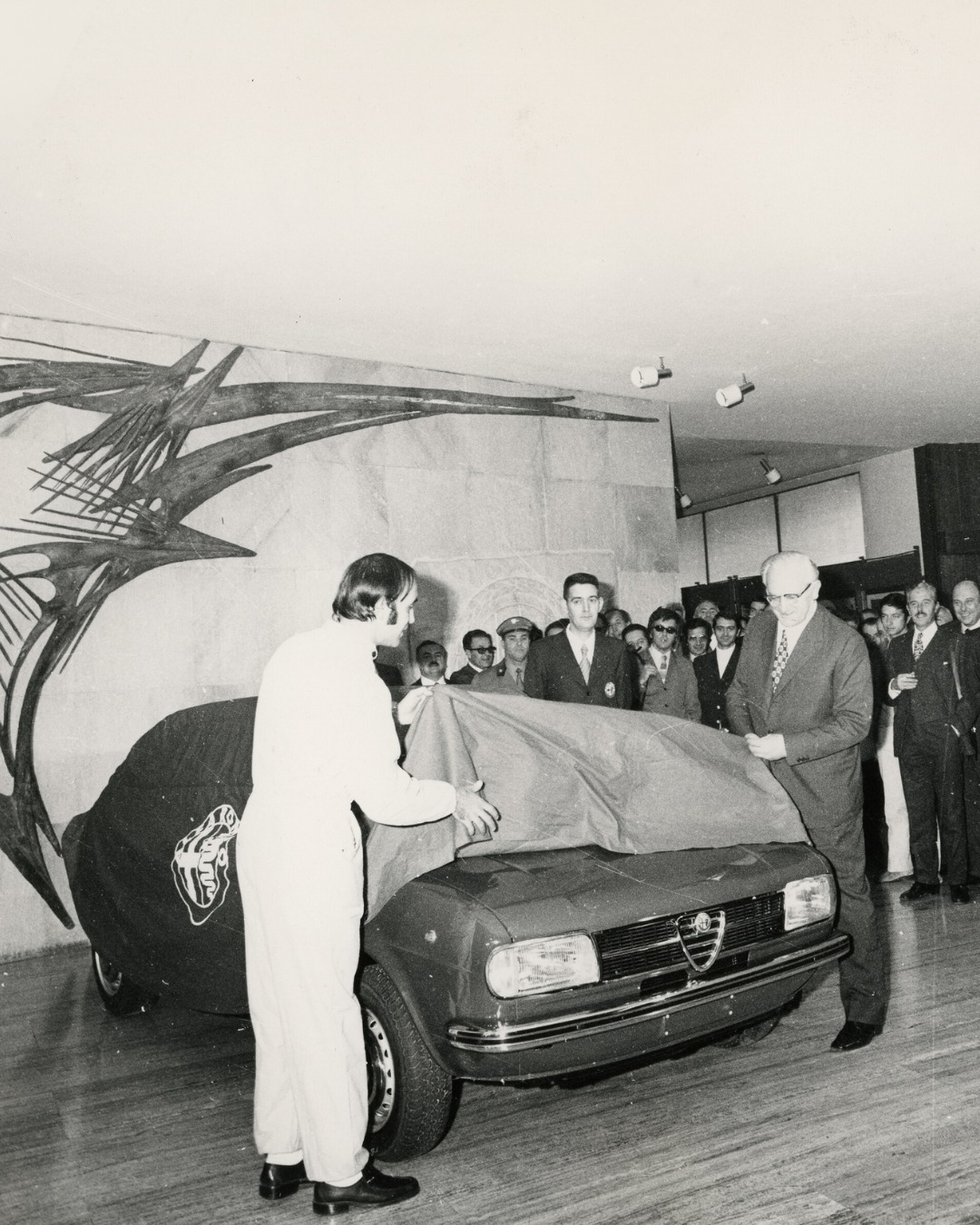
Luraghi unveiling Alfa Romeo Alfasud at the 1971 Turin Auto Show.

Giuseppe Eugenio Luraghi (12 June 1905 – 11 December 1991) was an Italian automobile executive, mechanical engineer, writer and poet. He is mostly known for his association with Alfa Romeo, where he was president.

== Biography ==
Luraghi was born in Milan. His father, Felice, died at the time of Spanish flu when Giuseppe was 15. His mother died two years later. Despite these personal struggles, Luraghi was able to continue his studies and graduated in Economics and Trade at Bocconi University in Milan.

After a brief spell as journalist for the daily Il Popolo d'Italia, in 1930 he was hired by the tyre manufacturer Pirelli. He was head of the Barcelona office of the company before the outbreak of the Spanish Civil War in 1936. In 1950 he was hired by Enrico Marchesano (1894–1967), president of the Institute for Industrial Reconstruction (IRI), to become the director of a hydroelectric powerplant in Piedmont. In 1951 he was appointed director of Finmeccanica, the technical branch of IRI, a position he held til 1956. Following a period of time at the helm of the textile company Lanerossi in Vicenza, Luraghi was nominated Vice President and then President of Alfa Romeo. During his time at Alfa Romeo, he supported the creation of the Alfa Romeo Giulietta, which became one of the marque's most popular models. Luraghi retired from his post at Alfa Romeo in 1974, and was replaced by Ettore Massacesi.

Luraghi was also a poet, non-fiction writer and novelist. His first novel, Due milanesi alle piramidi was published in 1966. He contributed regularly to the daily Corriere della Sera. From 1977 to 1983 he was President of the Milanese publishing house Arnoldo Mondadori Editore.

Luraghi was married to Liliana Poli. They had five children - Renzo, Liliana, Chiara, Marina and Dario. He died in 1991 following a brief illness.

== Publications ==
=== Poetry ===
- Presentimento di poesia (1940)
- Gli angeli (1941)
- Cipresso di van Gogh (Officine Grafiche Esperia, 1944)
- Stagioni (Edizioni della Meridiana, 1947)
- Poesie (1978)
- Oh bej, oh bej (All'Insegna del Pesce d'Oro, 1987)

=== Non-Fiction Books ===
- Le macchine della libertà (Bompiani, 1967)
- Alfasud: Mezzogiorno di fuoco (1975)
- Milano: dal quattrino al milione (Baldini & Castoldi, 1968)
- Capi si diventa (1974)

=== Novels ===
- Due milanesi alle piramidi (Mondadori, 1966)
- Pepp Girella ai fanghi (Mondadori, 1974)
- Miracolo a Porta Ticinese (Mondadori, 1976)
- Castelli di carte (Mondadori, 1978)

== Literature ==
- Daniele Pozzi, Giuseppe Luraghi: Una sfida al capitalismo italiano, Marsilio, Venice, 2012.
