= Autodelta (UK) =

Motor vehicle company in London, England

Autodelta London Limited
- Type: Limited Company
- Industry: Automotive
- Founded: 1987
- Headquarters: Watford, United Kingdom
- Key people: Jano Djelalian (Founder); Sergio Truzzi (Head of Research and Development)
- Number of employees: 2 (2020)
- Website: Official website

Autodelta is an after-market tuning company for Alfa Romeo cars, founded in 1987. Originally based in the Park Royal industrial area, northwest London, England, the company are now located in nearby Watford.

The company is not affiliated with Alfa Romeo's own racing department Autodelta established in 1963.

== Background ==
Founded by Jano Djelalian, the company specialises in produces tuning parts and full bodykits for various Alfa Romeo cars, alongside regular servicing, repair and engineering work. In addition, Autodelta produce pre-made fully tuned Alfa Romeo cars with modifications including suspension, engine upgrades, and forced induction tuning. Early examples of Autodelta's work included supercharging the Alfa Romeo 166, and an engine upgrade package for the SZ sportscar which included boring the engine out to 3.5 litres and adding a supercharger and two years later, the supercharged option for the SZ was enhanced even further by a higher performance unit being developed with Danish firm Rotrex.

In 2004, the company gained notable coverage when their modified 147 GTA AM appeared on motoring program Top Gear, Series 2, Episode 8. The 147 set a 'Power Lap' time of 1 minute 30 seconds. The original 147 GTA completed a lap time of 1.35.6, placing the Autodelta modified version over 5 seconds faster. For 2005, Autodelta released a 341 horsepower Alfa Romeo GT at MPH'05, which in 2007 was relaunched with a bored out 3.7 litre engine producing over 400 horsepower. Model number 001 has hit the UK market for sale twice in 2017 and 2021. Also in 2007, Autodelta released their modified Alfa Romeo Spider titled the J6, and returned to upgrade the 147 GTA to 422hp.

By mid-2008, Autodelta officially released the 159 J4 2.2 C with a range of modifications including the addition of a supercharger, a new intake system, ignition system from NGK and a limited slip differential. Autodelta created a one-off Type 916 Spider for a private customer in the UK called the Spider Superflow, featuring a unique body and an overhauled V6 engine producing 341hp. In 2009, the company released their Brera S 3.2 Compressore at the MPH'09 motor show. Following the release of the Alfa Romeo 8C Competizione, Autodelta confirmed they were working on a modification package for the supercar to be launched in 2010.

The models Autodelta create are classed into various series, including the J-series (named after founder Djelalian), C series for supercharged models, Super series for modified JTS engined Alfa Romeos and Classic for models such as the SZ.

Alongside their base in Watford, Autodelta offer their products through International partners in five locations; Italy, Greece, Australia, Malaysia and Russia.

== Lineup ==
Base model	Modifications
Alfa Romeo 147	147 J12; 147 GTA AM; 147 GTA AM Super
Alfa Romeo 156	156 J11; 156 GTS Super; 156 GTA; 156 GTA AM; 156 GTA AM Super
Alfa Romeo 159	J4 2.2C
Alfa Romeo GT	GT 3.2 Super; GT 3.2 Super EVO; GT 3.7; GT 3.7 Super
Alfa Romeo Brera/Spider	Brera J.5 3.2C; Spider J.6 3.2C
Alfa Romeo GTV/Spider	GTV J10; Spider J10
Alfa Romeo SZ	Autodelta SZ
