= Alfa Romeo GT =

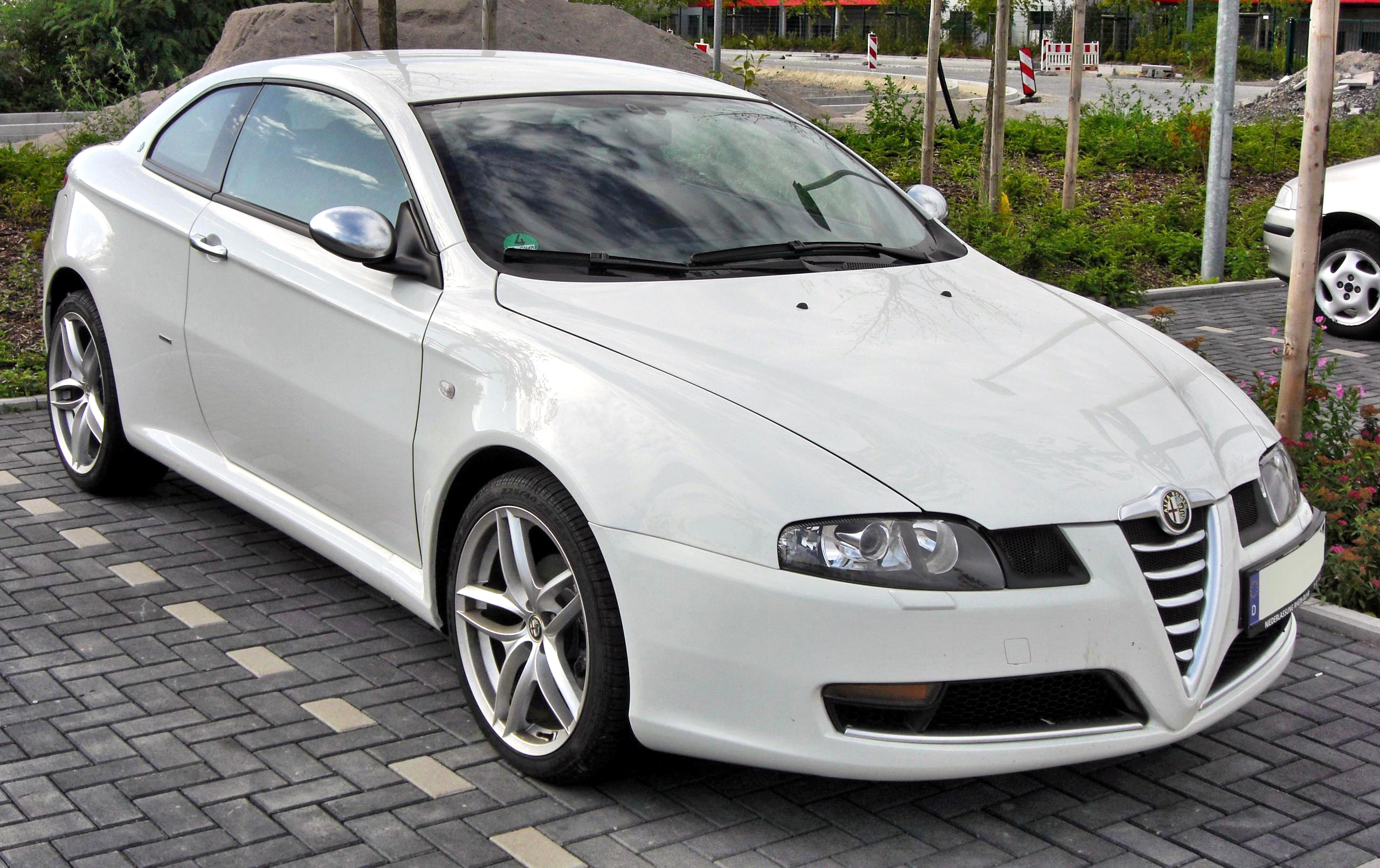

Overview
- Manufacturer: Alfa Romeo (Note: Fiat Auto (2003–2007) Fiat Group Automobiles (2007–2010))
- Model code: 937
- Production: November 2003 – June 2010
- Assembly: Italy: Pomigliano d'Arco
- Designer: Giuliano Biasio at Bertone

Body and chassis
- Class: Sports car
- Body style: 2-door coupé
- Layout: Front-engine, front-wheel-drive
- Platform: Type Two rev. 3
- Related: Alfa Romeo 156; Alfa Romeo 147; Fiat Bravo/Brava; Fiat Marea; Fiat Multipla; Lancia Lybra

Powertrain
- Engine: Petrol: 1.8 L Twin Spark I4 16V; 2.0 L JTS I4 16V; 3.2 L Busso V6 24V; Diesel: 1.9 L JTD turbo-diesel I4 16V
- Transmission: 5-speed manual; 6-speed manual; 5-speed Selespeed automated manual

Dimensions
- Wheelbase: 2,596 mm (102.2 in)
- Length: 4,489 mm (176.7 in)
- Width: 1,763 mm (69.4 in)
- Height: 1,366 mm (53.8 in) (JTD); 1,362 mm (53.6 in); 1,355 mm (53.3 in) (V6)
- Kerb weight: 1,395–1,485 kg (3,075–3,274 lb)

Chronology
- Predecessor: Alfa Romeo Sprint

The Alfa Romeo GT (Type 937) is a sports car that was produced by the Italian automaker Alfa Romeo between 2003 and 2010. It was the last production Alfa Romeo designed by Bertone. The GT was introduced in March 2003 at the Geneva Motor Show. Production started on 28 November 2003 at the Pomigliano d'Arco plant, which the GT shared the assembly plant with the 147 and 159. A total of 80,832 units were produced.

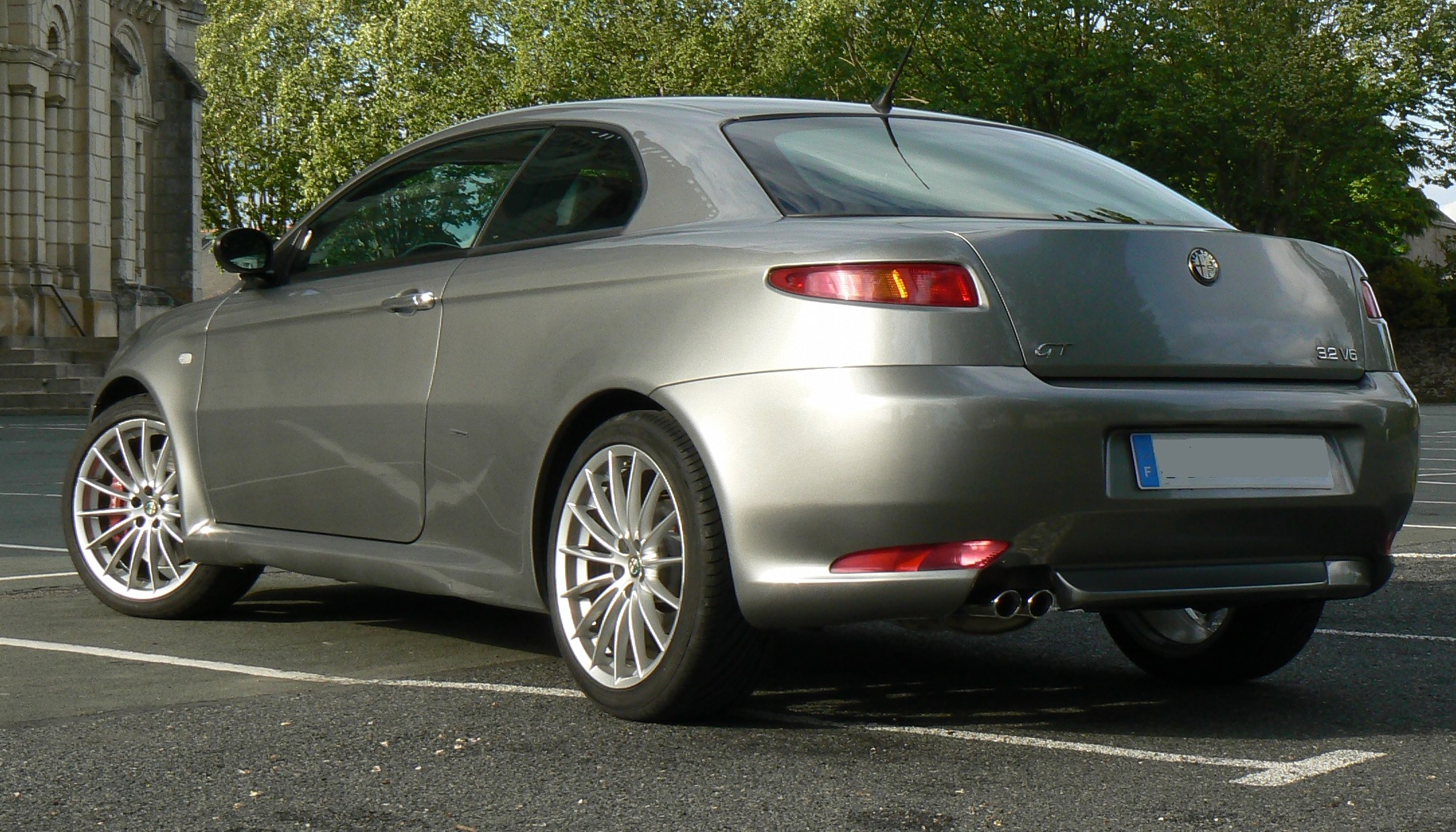
Rear view of an Alfa Romeo GT 3.2

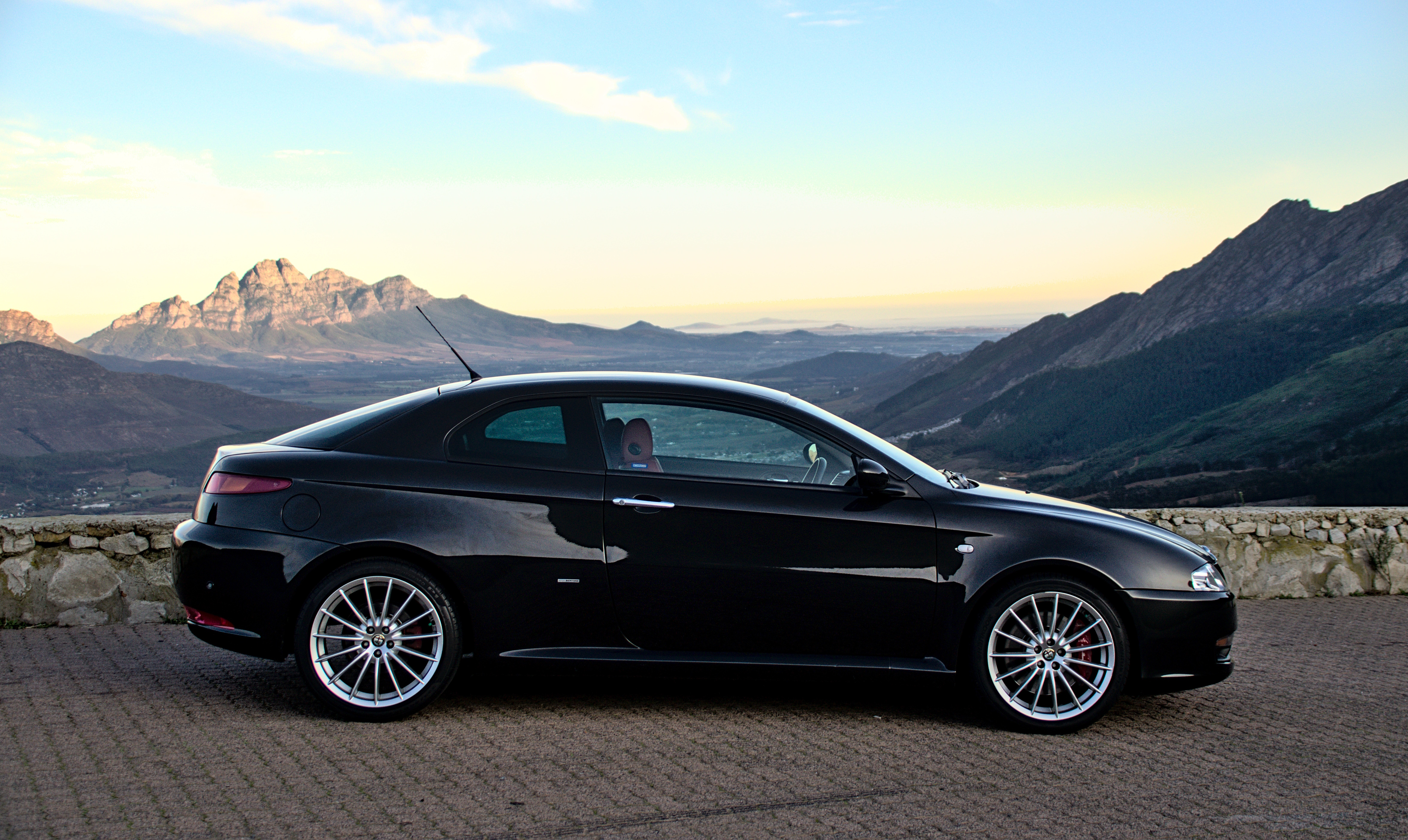
Side view of an Alfa Romeo GT

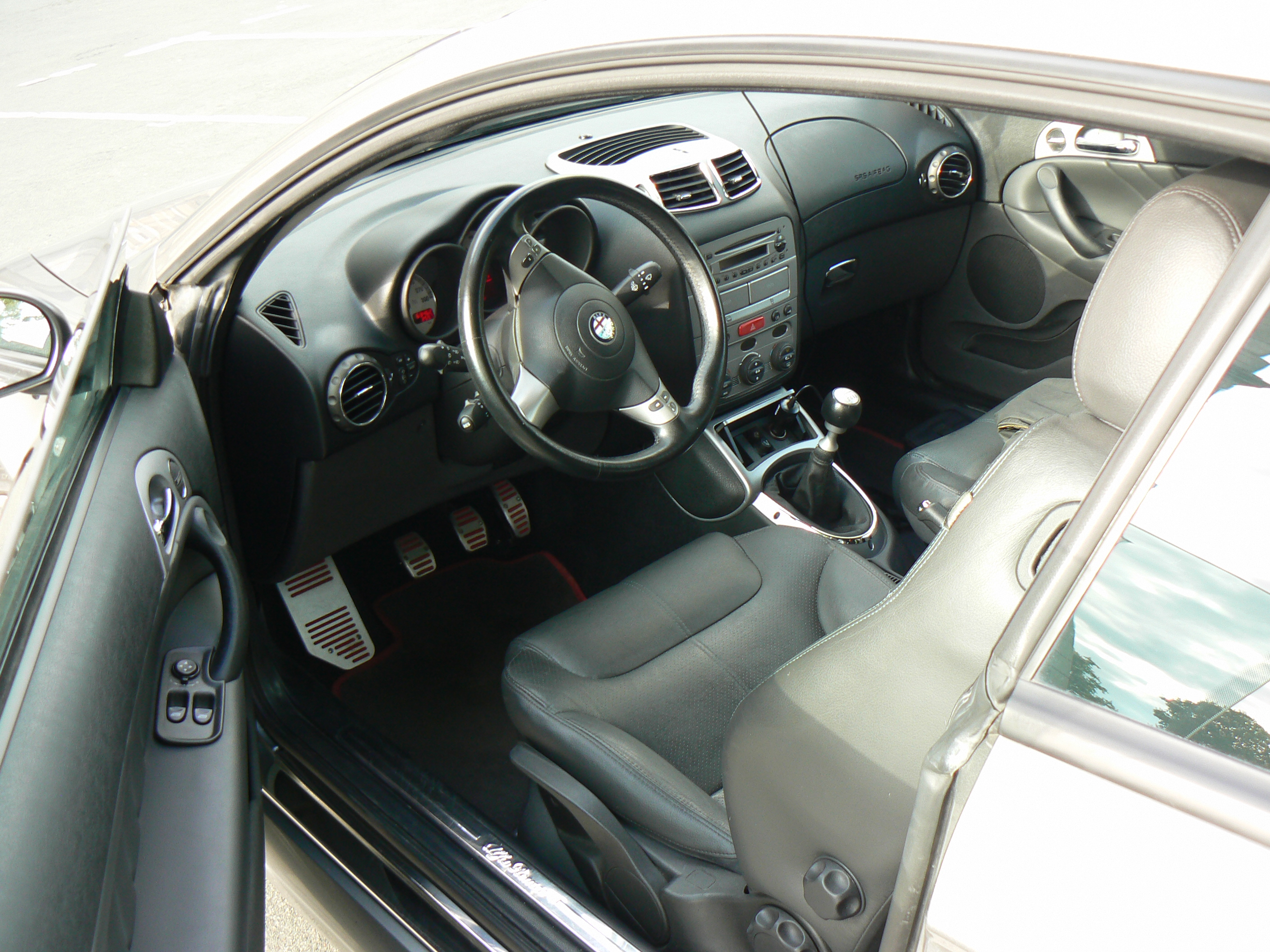
Interior

== History ==
The GT was based on Fiat C-platform (also used for the 156, 147, Lancia Lybra, Fiat Bravo/Brava/Marea & Multipla) with styling by Bertone. Initially, Bertone insisted to assemble the car at their own plant but after refusal from Alfa Romeo's parent company Fiat, the GT was assembled at the Pomigliano plant instead.

The bodywork is in a classic coupé style, but uses a hatchback two door style compared to the earlier coupés like GTV. Combined with a full rear bench giving five seats (rather than a 2+2 layout) the GT was advertised as being a practical sports car. Most mechanicals were taken directly from the 156/147 using the same double wishbone front suspension and independent rear using MacPherson struts, parallel arms, and reaction rods.

The interior is derived from the smaller 147 hatchback and shares many common parts: such as having the same dashboard layout, functions, the climate control system as well as having a similar electrical system.

Some exterior parts are also shared with the 147 such as the bonnet, wing mirrors, and front wings (from the 147 GTA). The engine range included both the 1.8 TS and the 2.0 JTS petrol engines, a 1.9 MultiJet turbodiesel, and a top of the range 3.2 V6 petrol engine. Luggage capacity is 320 L (11 cu ft) which could be enlarged to 905 L (32 cu ft) with the rear seats folded.

The GT was positioned as a sports car in Alfa Romeo's range, along with the Brera (which was based on the newer mid-size Alfa 159). In October 2006, Alfa Romeo introduced a 1.9 JTD Q2 version with a limited-slip differential, and also added a new trim level called Black Line.

In 2008, the cloverleaf model was launched as a limited edition complete with new trim levels, lowered suspension, body kit, 18 inch alloy wheels and was only available in Black, Alfa Red, or Blue colours. The engines included the 1.8 L and 2.0 L petrol, as well as 1.9 L Multijet turbo diesel. Production of the cloverleaf ended on 16 June 2010.

== Specifications ==
Standard features included power steering, a trip computer, dual-zone climate control, six airbags (including side curtain airbags) with internal passenger sensors to decide remotely which airbags to deploy, side mirror defrosters, and cruise control, plus options like reverse assist, heated seats, leather interior, ten CD changer, satellite navigation and windscreen sensors for automatic wiper activation.

=== Engines ===
The GT primarily shared its engines with the 156. The layout and design of the engines is identical, although with some differences in power outputs, with a 170 PS (125 kW; 168 hp) version of the diesel available and the quoted power output of the V6 slightly lower at 240 PS (177 kW; 237 hp) instead of 250 PS (184 kW; 247 hp) for the 156 GTA.

- Petrol
  - 1.8L inline four, 16 valve Twin Spark
  - 2.0L inline four, 16 valve JTS petrol with direct injection
  - 3.2L V6, 24 valve 'Busso'
- Diesel
  - 1.9L turbocharged inline four, 16 valve JTD, available in 150 PS (110 kW; 148 hp) and 170 PS (125 kW; 168 hp) variants

Model	Engine	Displacement	Power	Torque	Top speed	0–100 km/h (62 mph) (seconds)
1.8 TS	I4	1.7 L (1,747 cc)	140 PS (103 kW; 138 hp) at 6,500 rpm	163 N⋅m (120 lb⋅ft) at 3,900 rpm	200 km/h (124 mph)	10.6
2.0 JTS	I4	2.0 L (1,970 cc)	165 PS (121 kW; 163 hp) at 6,400 rpm	206 N⋅m (152 lb⋅ft) at 3,250 rpm	216 km/h (134 mph)	8.7
3.2 V6	V6	3.2 L (3,179 cc)	240 PS (177 kW; 237 hp) at 6,200 rpm	300 N⋅m (221 lb⋅ft) at 4,800 rpm	243 km/h (151 mph)	6.7
1.9 JTDm	I4	1.9 L (1,910 cc)	150 PS (110 kW; 148 hp) at 4,000 rpm	305 N⋅m (225 lb⋅ft) at 2,000 rpm	209 km/h (130 mph)	9.2
1.9 JTDm	I4	1.9 L (1,910 cc)	170 PS (125 kW; 168 hp) at 3,750 rpm	330 N⋅m (243 lb⋅ft) at 2,000 rpm	216 km/h (134 mph)	8.2

=== Brakes and suspension ===
The standard braking system consisted of 284 mm (11.2 in) ventilated front discs with 276 mm (10.9 in) at the rear. The 3.2 V6 model has 330 mm (13.0 in) ventilated discs at front. The GT included anti-lock braking system with electronic brakeforce distribution and hydraulic brake assistance.

Other features included VDC (Vehicle Dynamic Control) or Alfa's version of ESP (Electronic Stability Program), ASR (Anti Slip Regulation) or traction control, EBD (Electronic Brake Distribution), ABS, brake assist and later the Q2 System. The Q2 system is Alfa's limited-slip differential technology, for improved cornering, reducing wheel spin, and torque steer, to help mitigate understeer common to front-wheel-drive cars.

=== Fuel consumption ===
Model	Fuel cons. urban (mpg–imp (l/100 km))	Fuel cons. extra-urban (mpg–imp (l/100 km))	Fuel cons. combined (mpg–imp (l/100 km))
1.8 TS	23.0 (12.1)	44.0 (6.4)	35.0 (8.5)
2.0 JTS	23.2 (12.2)	42.2 (6.7)	32.5 (8.7)
3.2 V6	15.2 (18.6)	32.5 (8.7)	22.8 (12.4)
1.9 JTDm	33.2 (8.2)	57.6 (4.8)	45.6 (6.1)
1.9 JTDm (170 PS)	32.5 (8.7)	58.9 (4.8)	45.6 (6.2)

== Special models ==
At the end of its production, several special models of the GT were launched for sale in different markets which included the following.

=== The Special Edition (British Market) ===
The Special Edition 1.9 JTDm was produced for the British market, where it had to be preordered by the customer. Its unofficial name was "quadrifoglio verde" (cloverleaf). It had leather interior and Q2 system as standard.

=== The Run Out Edition (Sport) (Dutch Market) ===
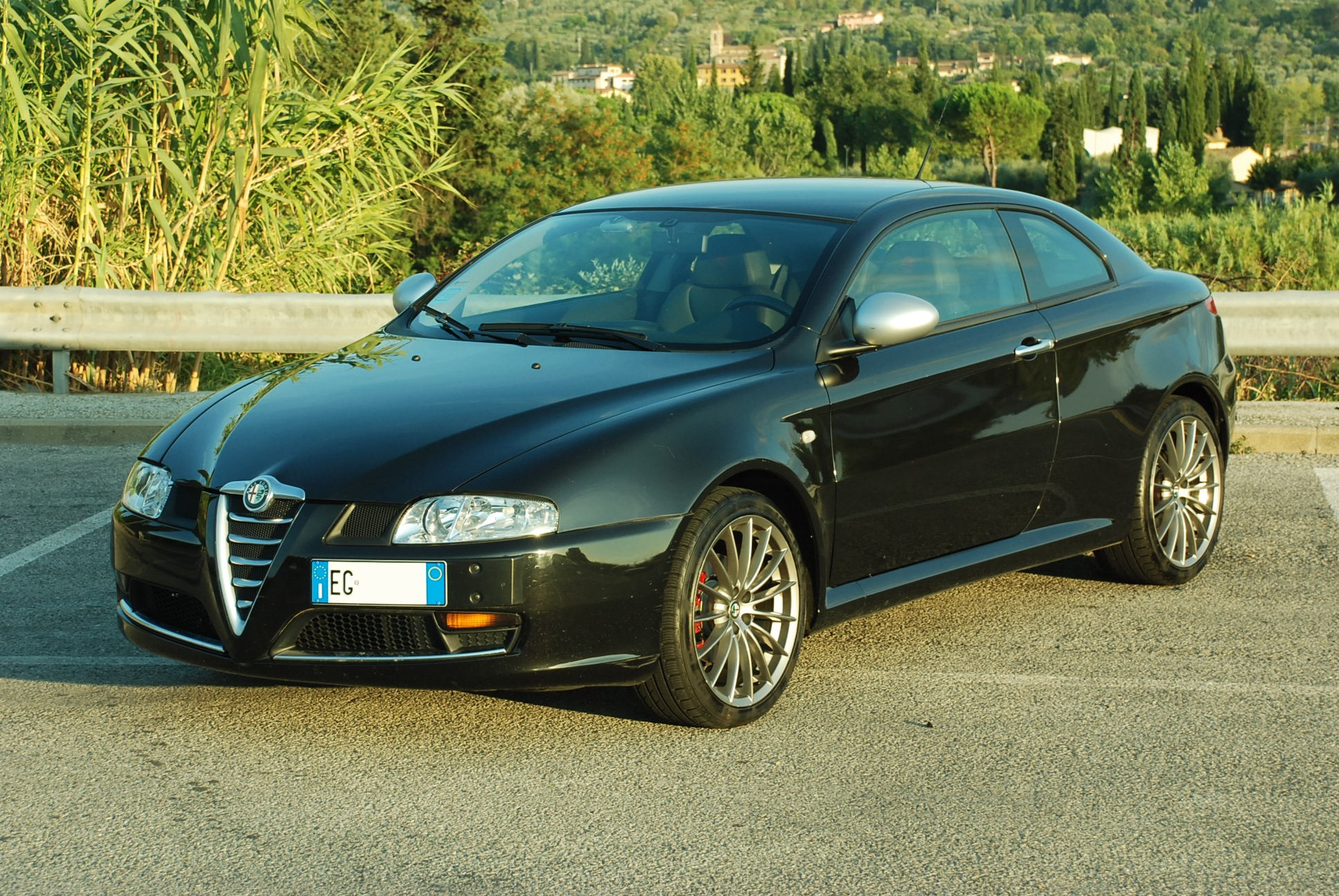
GT Run Out Edition (sport)

The Run Out Edition 2.0 JTS (black only) was assembled in a run of 12 cars for the Dutch dealers only. This version had some specifications improved in respect to the creature comforts; the Bose audio system was connected to a multimedia USB and was integrated to the Bluetooth blue&me system.

The Run Out Edition has eighteen-inch alloy wheels, painted brake calipers, black instruments with white backlighting, a black leather steering wheel, and alloy pedals. Furthermore, the car is fitted with specific sized grey leather seats and interior.

=== The Centenario (Australian, South African and French Markets) ===
The "100th anniversary limited edition" version is intended for the Australian and South African markets;, and coloured Rosso Alfa, Atlantic Blue, Black and Ice White. The "100th Anniversary Limited Edition" was produced in a limited run of 130 units: 100 for the Australian market and 30 for the South African market.

Following an overhauling of the range in that market, GTs were equipped with the 3.2 V6 with the manual six speed gearbox. A "Centenario" version was made for the French market. It had a rear view camera, Blue & Me and the 1.9 JTDm 16V engine.

=== The Quadrifoglio Oro (Japanese Market) ===
The Quadrifoglio Oro was a special model for the Japanese market and was limited to 60 units with specifications similar to the Dutch Run Out: 2.0 JTS engine, Selespeed gearbox, red instruments, alloy wheels, red paint. This was the last model of the GT to be made.

== GT Cabriolet Concept ==
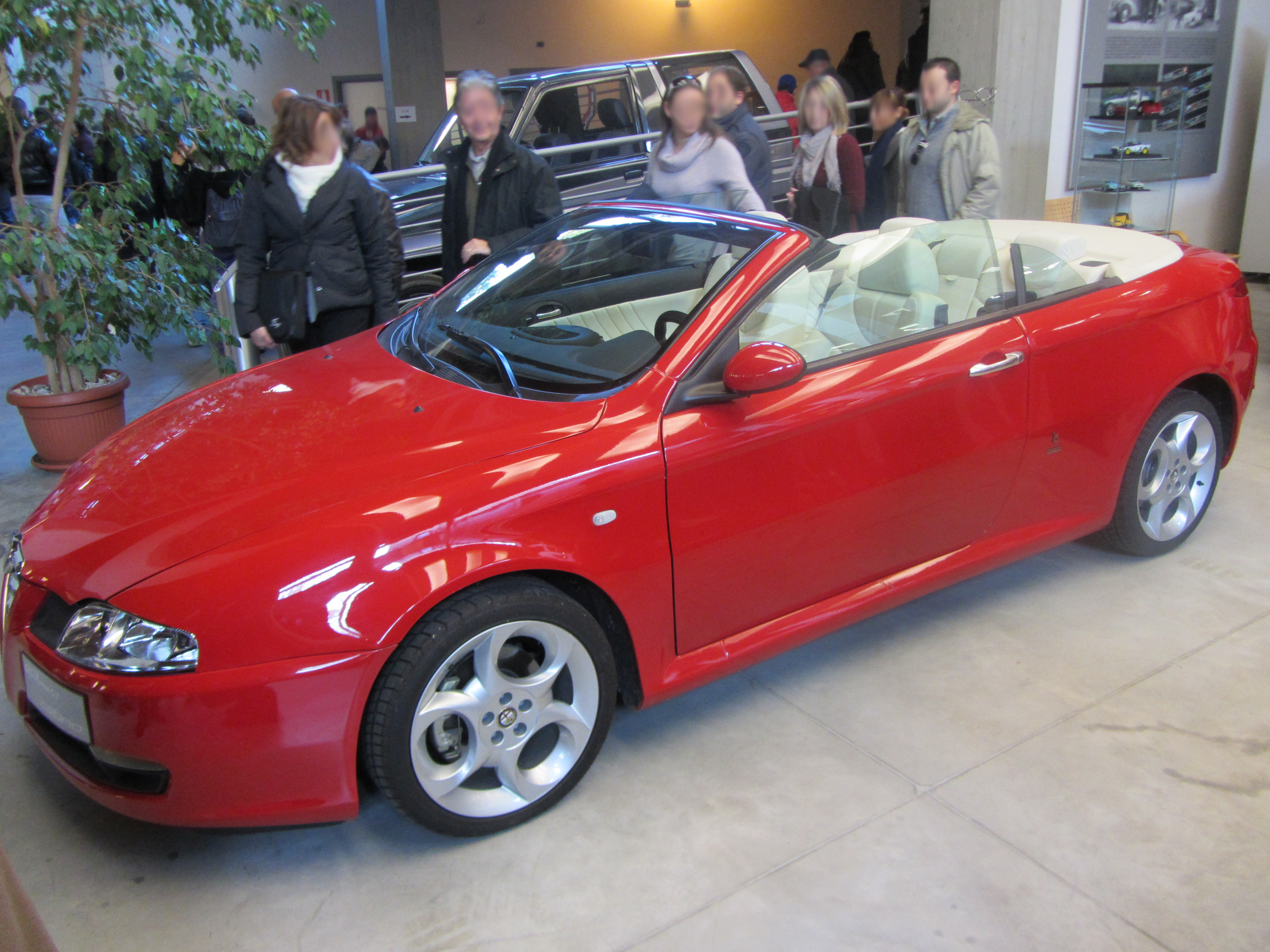
GT Cabriolet concept

A soft-top GT Cabrio Concept was designed and developed by Bertone in 2003, it was unveiled to the public on April 6, 2011. The car was a five-seat open-top version of the GT coupé, which Bertone hoped to get built at their own plant. The next-generation Alfa Romeo open-top car was instead built by Pininfarina, using the Brera coupé as a base. This move ultimately led to the bankruptcy of Bertone and it was bought by Fiat who restructured it into its operations.

== Reception ==
The GT has been acclaimed for its attractive styling and purposeful good looks. The design by Bertone follows a history of collaboration with Alfa Romeo.

In 2004, the Alfa Romeo GT was voted the world's most beautiful coupe in the annual 'World's Most Beautiful Automobile' (L'Automobile più Bella del Mondo) awards, as well as the Design Trophy award by the French magazine L'Automobile.
