= Alfa Romeo Visconti =

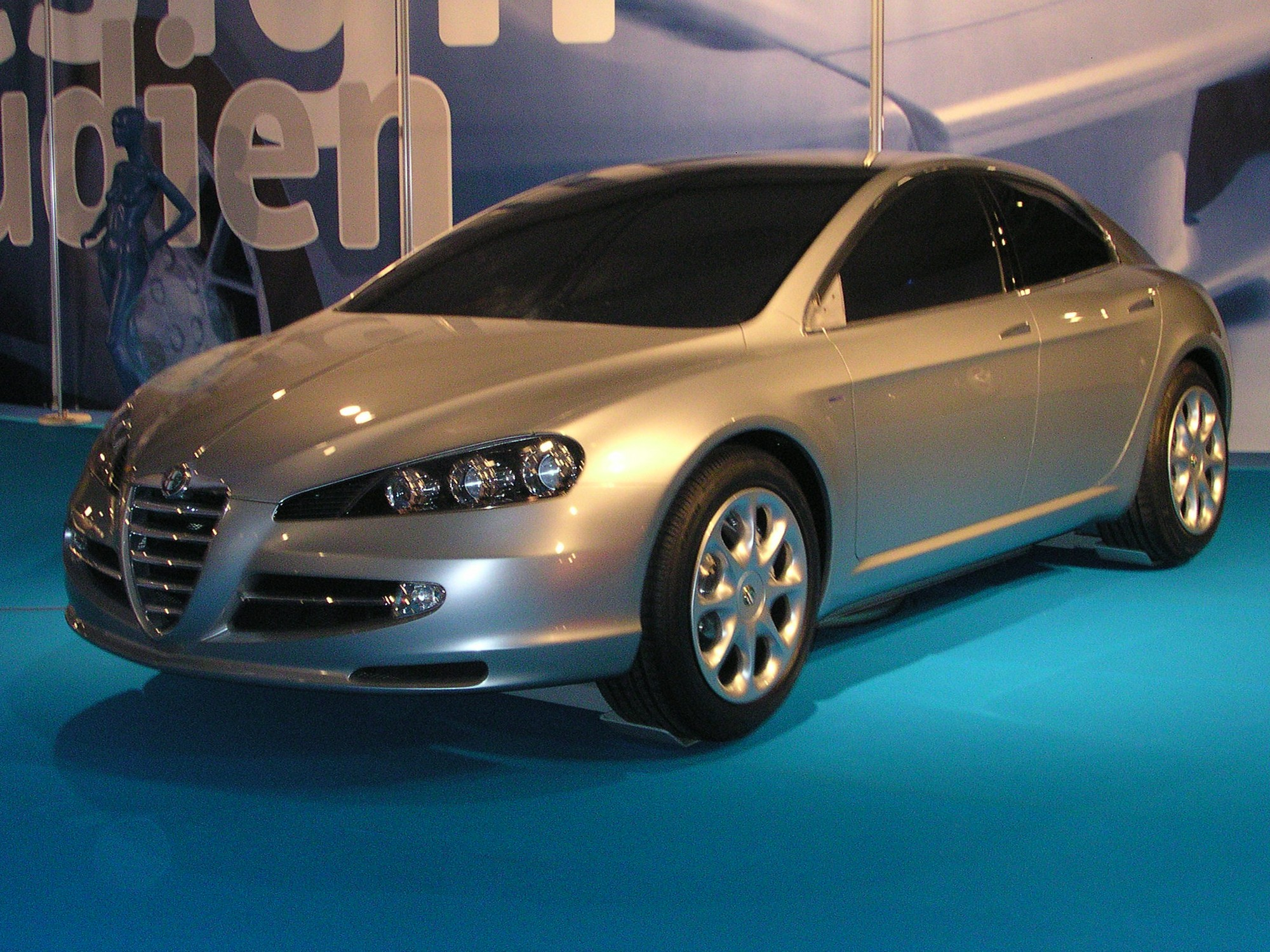

Overview
- Manufacturer: Alfa Romeo
- Production: 2004
- Designer: Giorgetto Giugiaro at Italdesign

Body and chassis
- Class: Concept car
- Body style: 4-door saloon/coupe
- Layout: FF layout/Four wheel drive
- Platform: GM/Fiat Premium
- Related: Alfa Romeo 159; Alfa Romeo Brera & Spider (939)

Powertrain
- Engine: 60° V6 3.2 L (3195 cc) JTS Twin Turbo
- Transmission: 6-speed automatic

Dimensions
- Wheelbase: 2,825 mm (111.2 in)
- Length: 4,955 mm (195.1 in)
- Width: 1,896 mm (74.6 in)
- Height: 1,474 mm (58.0 in)

The Alfa Romeo Visconti is a concept car made by the Italian car manufacturer Alfa Romeo, designed by Giorgetto Giugiaro. The car was seen for the first time at the Geneva Motor Show in 2004. The car is a four-door fastback coupé/sedan and is almost 5 metres (200 in) long. Under the bonnet is a 3.2-litre V6 JTS biturbo engine, which produces 405 PS (298 kW; 399 hp) at 6000 rpm and 680 N⋅m (502 lbf⋅ft) of torque at 2000 rpm.

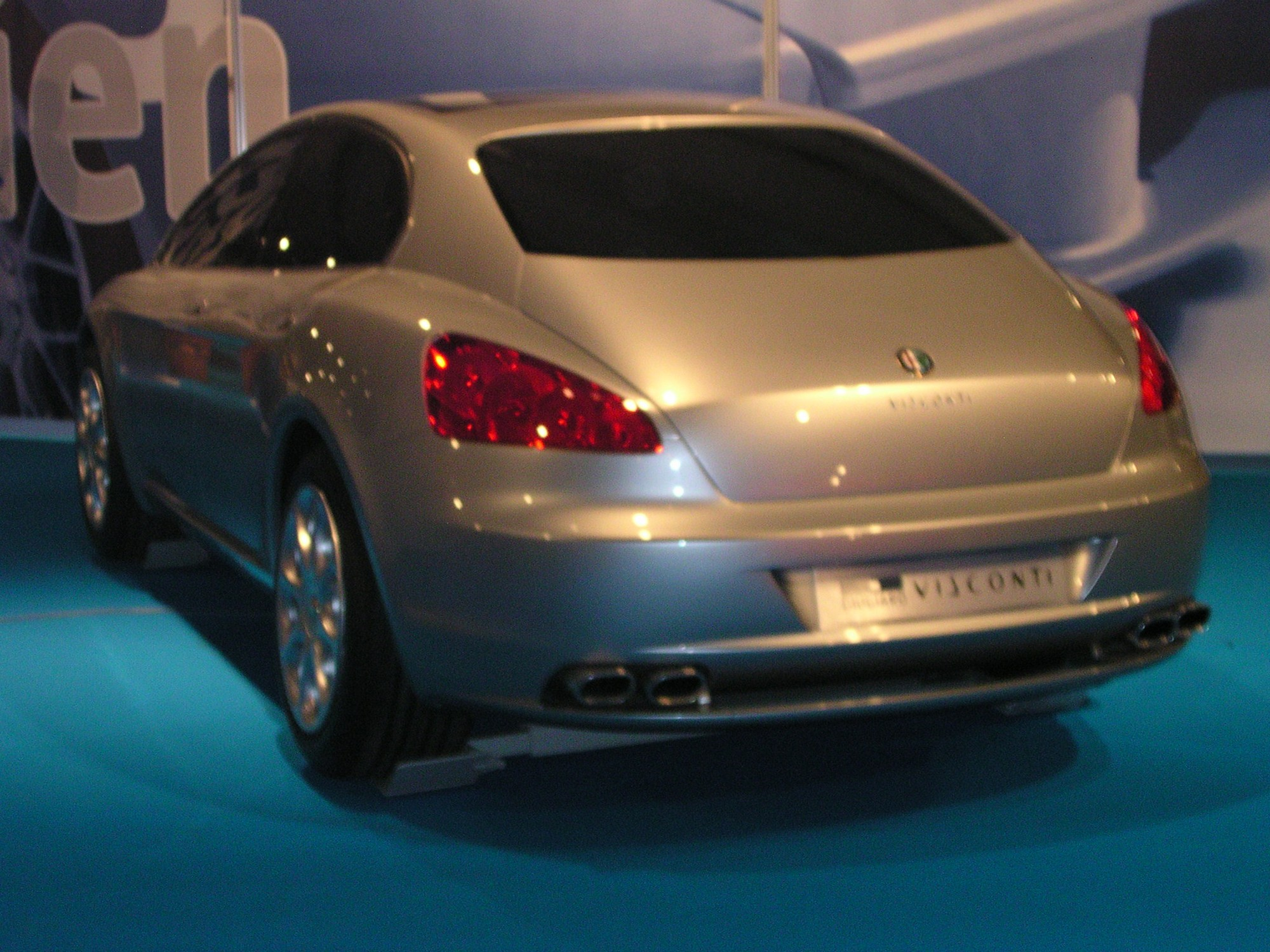
Rear view

The car is front-engined all-wheel-drive assisted with rear-wheel steering, with a six-speed automatic gearbox and Brembo's composite ceramic brake discs all-round.

The name Visconti comes from old Milanese family ancestry. Their coat of arms, a snake rebirthing a person, is part of the logo of Alfa Romeo.
