= Selespeed =

Automated manual gearbox

Selespeed is the name of an automated manual transmission used in Alfa Romeo cars, developed by Italian company Magneti Marelli and made by Graziano Trasmissioni.

The Selespeed is an automated manual gearbox with an electronic clutch. Technically, it consists of the standard (manual) 5 or 6-speed gearbox with the standard clutch and adds an electronically controlled hydraulic (robotic) that actuates both gear and clutch.

In its current incarnation, it can be operated via paddle-shifters from the steering wheel or via a "joystick" like a conventional sequential manual gearbox, used in touring cars. The right-hand paddle-shifter shifts upwards and the left side downwards. The gearbox also has a city-mode that self-shifts in a manner similar to a traditional automatic gearbox.

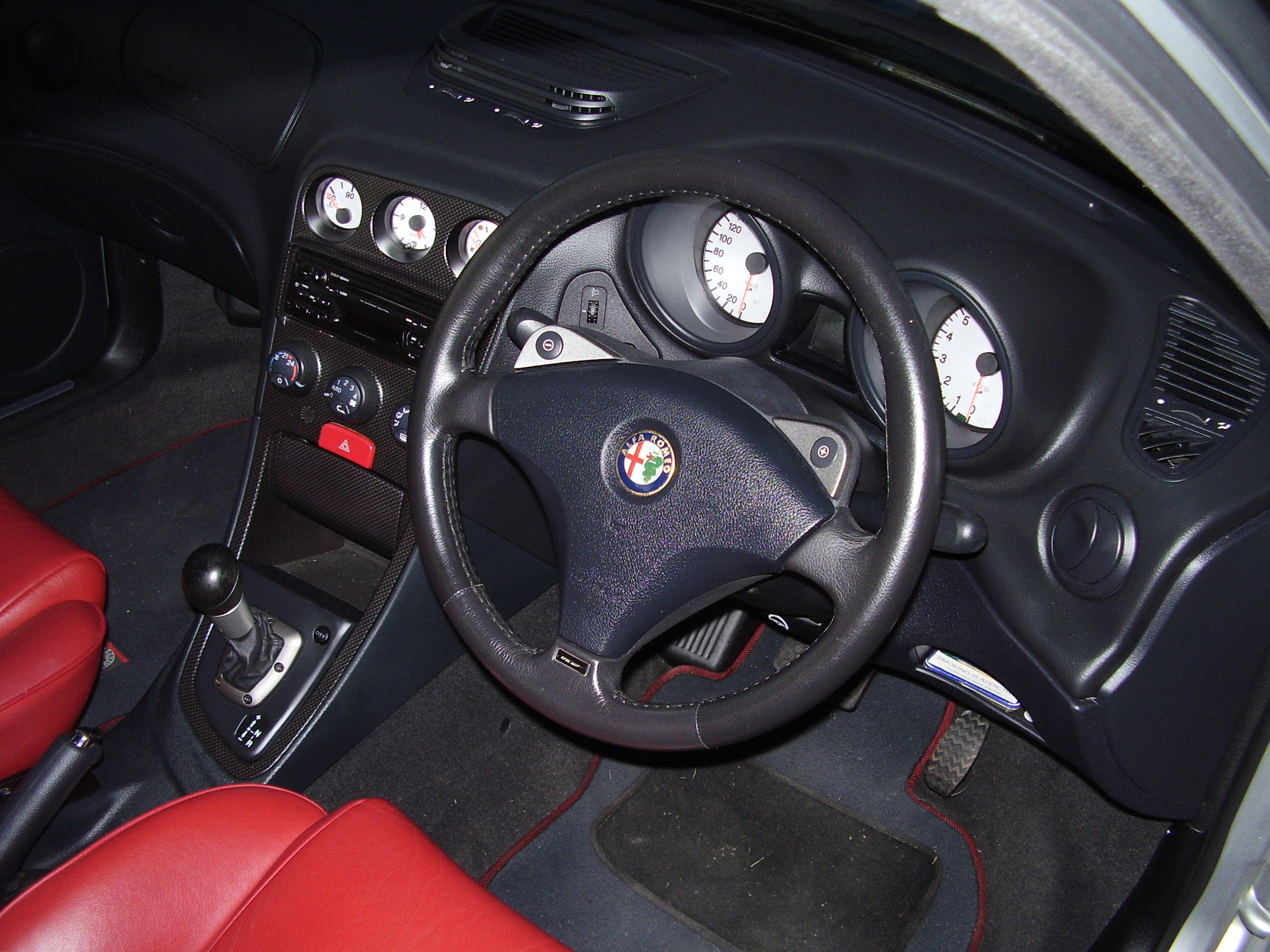
Alfa Romeo Selespeed, 1st generation had buttons on the steering wheel.

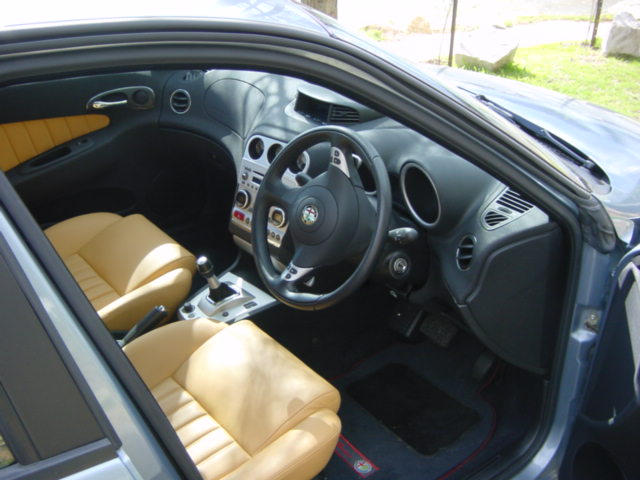
2nd generation has paddles behind the steering wheel.

Selespeed was first introduced in 1999 in the Alfa Romeo 156. At that time it was the first car in its class with such a robotized gearbox. This first version had buttons on the steering wheel for changing gear. With the facelift of the 156 in 2002, these buttons were replaced by paddle-shifters (first seen in the Alfa Romeo 147) due to a new steering wheel design.

During normal driving, it is possible to use either the paddles or the joystick but if the driver tries to use paddles during joystick mode the joystick has higher priority. The speed of the gear change depends on the engine revs. If the engine has more than 5000 rpm and the throttle is pressed more than 60%, the change is faster. The system also has a rev limiter to avoid over-revving (in GTA models this behavior is removed). Downshift is accompanied by automatic rev-matching. This gearbox is made for sportive driving but the city-mode allows using it as an automatic transmission in city driving.

== Models ==
Automated manual transmissions made by Magneti Marelli are called “Selespeed” in Alfa Romeo cars, “Dualogic” in Fiat cars, and “D.F.N” (Italian: Dolce Far Niente, lit. 'sweet doing nothing') in Lancia cars.

| Model | Version |
|---|---|
| 156 | 2.0 TS |
| 156 GTA | 3.2 GTA |
| 156 | 2.0 JTS |
| 147 | 2.0 TS |
| 147 GTA | 3.2 GTA |
| GT | 2.0 JTS |
| 159 | 2.2 JTS |
| Brera | 2.2 JTS |
| Spider | 2.2 JTS |
| Fiat Punto (1999) | 1.2 8V, 1.2 16V, 1.3 Multijet, 1.4 16V |
| Fiat Stilo | 2.4 20V |
| Fiat 500 (2007) | |
| Lancia Ypsilon (2003) | 1.2 8V, 1.3 Multijet, 1.4 16V |
| Lancia Musa | 1.3 Multijet, 1.4 16V |
| Lancia Ypsilon (2011) | |

Other cars using similar gearboxes are the Ferrari 355 F1 and Aston Martin Vanquish. The base system is similar in all cars but the speed of operation is usually faster in higher priced cars. BMW's first generation SMG was also partly a Magneti Marelli system. Also Fiat, Lamborghini, Maserati, Mercedes-Benz, Renault, Peugeot and Citroen used the Selespeed system.
