= General Motors/Fiat Premium platform =

GM/Fiat Premium platform

Body and chassis
- Class: Compact executive car (D); Convertible; Coupe
- Layout: Front engine, Front-wheel drive / Four-wheel drive
- Body styles: Sedan; Coupe; Roadster; Station wagon
- Vehicles: Alfa Romeo Brera; Alfa Romeo Spider; Alfa Romeo 159; Alfa Romeo 159 Sportwagon; Alfa Romeo Visconti (concept car)

Dimensions
- Wheelbase: 2,525–2,700 mm (99.4–106.3 in)

Chronology
- Successor: FCA Giorgio Platform

The Premium platform was General Motors's and Fiat Group's high-end automobile platform for front wheel drive and four wheel drive automobiles developed in early 2000s mainly in Sweden by Saab engineers.

The architecture debuted in production form with the Alfa Romeo 159 in 2004, although it was used for the Alfa Romeo Visconti concept car. After the dissolution of the GM/Fiat partnership, both companies retained the rights to continue developing Premium-derived models, though no GM versions were produced as the platform was considered too expensive for Opel cars and a great cost for a small premium manufacturer as Saab.

Saab stopped the development of the platform and therefore of its Premium automobile in late 2002; the Saab models (the 9X sports car and the replacement for the 9-5 sedan) would have used an entirely different suspension than the Alfa Romeo vehicles, which would have proved too expensive. A planned Buick model was also dropped. In the end, only the Alfa Romeo models moved forward to production and Saab's development and introduction of new 9-5 was seriously delayed. Some of the GM models originally set to use the Premium platform eventually were produced using the GM Epsilon II platform.

== See also ==
List of GM platforms
