= Alfa Romeo JTS engine =

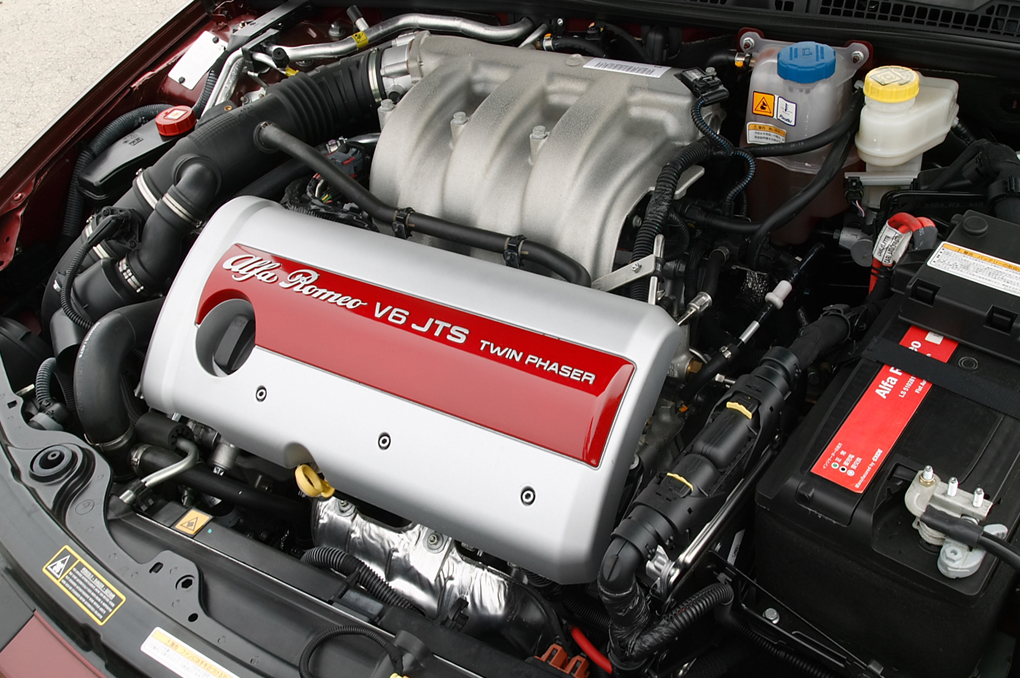

Overview
- Manufacturer: Alfa Romeo (2002-2011)
- Production: 2002–2011

Layout
- Configuration: Straight-4, 60° V6
- Displacement: 2.0 L (1,970 cc); 1.9 L (1,859 cc); 2.2 L (2,198 cc); 3.2 L (3,195 cc)
- Cylinder bore: 83 mm (3.27 in); 86 mm (3.39 in); 89 mm (3.50 in)
- Piston stroke: 91 mm (3.6 in); 80 mm (3.1 in); 94.6 mm (3.72 in); 85.6 mm (3.37 in)
- Cylinder block material: aluminium alloy cast-iron (2.0 JTS)
- Cylinder head material: Aluminium alloy
- Valvetrain: DOHC 4-valve with VVT
- Compression ratio: 11.25:1

Combustion
- Fuel system: Direct injection
- Fuel type: Petrol
- Cooling system: Water-cooled

Output
- Power output: 160–260 PS (118–191 kW; 158–256 hp)
- Torque output: 206–322 N⋅m (152–237 lb⋅ft)

Dimensions
- Dry weight: 168 kg (370 lb) (3.6 V6 High Feature engine)

Chronology
- Predecessor: Alfa Romeo Twin Spark; Alfa Romeo V6 engine
- Successor: FCA Global Medium Engine (I4); Alfa Romeo 690T engine (V6)

The JTS engine (Jet Thrust Stoichiometric) is a gasoline direct injection engine produced by Alfa Romeo. It exists in two forms, straight-4 and V6, and was introduced into the Alfa lineup in 2002.

== Four-cylinder ==
=== 2.0 ===
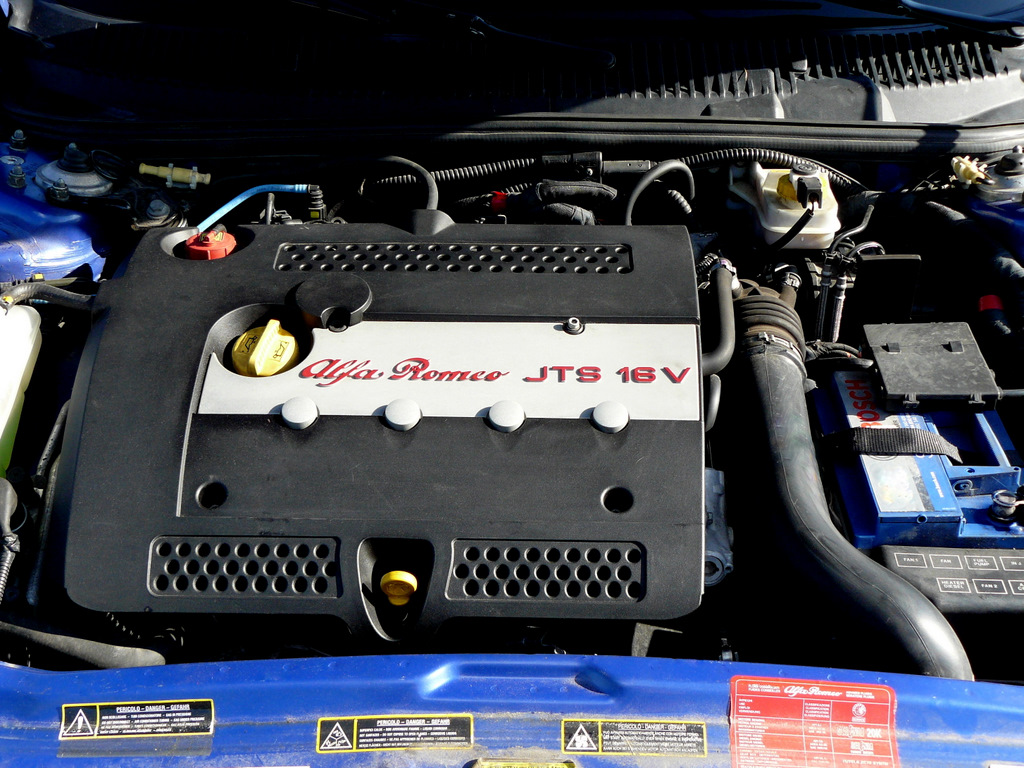
2.0 JTS engine.

The JTS engine debuted in 2002 in the Alfa Romeo 156. The engine was based on the 2.0 Twin Spark (itself a variant of the Pratola Serra engine family), replacing Twin Spark with direct injection, dubbed "Jet Thrust Stoichiometric". This improved power from 114 kW (155 PS; 153 hp) to 121 kW (165 PS; 162 hp), but more importantly, torque climbed from 187 N⋅m (138 lb⋅ft) to 206 N⋅m (152 lb⋅ft). In 2003, this engine was introduced to the GTV/Spider coupé and roadster and it was fitted to the GT from launch. In spite of its benefits to power, torque and economy, the JTS was not used in the smaller 147 or the larger 166, and much less in other models from the Fiat Group. This was allegedly because the JTS engine cost a lot more to produce than the Twin Spark.

- Displacement: 2.0 L (1,970 cc)
- Power: 121 kW (165 PS; 162 hp) at 6400 rpm
- Torque: 206 N⋅m (152 lb⋅ft) at 3250 rpm

Applications:

- 2002-2005 Alfa Romeo 156
- 2003-2004 Alfa Romeo GTV & Spider
- 2004-2010 Alfa Romeo GT

=== 1.9 ===
It was only in 2005, with the arrival of the 159, that more variants of the JTS were produced. The 2.0 JTS gave way to a 1.9 L variant with 160 PS (118 kW; 158 hp) and a 2.2 L version with 185 PS (136 kW; 182 hp). The 1.9 JTS and 2.2 JTS form part of a new engine family and are completely different from the 2.0 JTS. Both 1.9 L and 2.2 L have chain driven camshafts and variable valve timing on both inlet and exhaust camshafts. Both 1.9 and 2.2 JTS engine blocks were supplied by GM to the Fiat group and belong to the GM Ecotec engine family. Both models are mapped to either a six-speed manual gearbox plus a reverse gear, or a Formula One inspired sequential gearbox also having six gears and reverse.

- Displacement: 1.9 L (1,859 cc)
- Power: 118 kW (160 PS; 158 hp) at 6500 rpm
- Torque: 190 N⋅m (140 lb⋅ft) at 4500 rpm

Applications:

- 2005–2011 Alfa Romeo 159

=== 2.2 ===
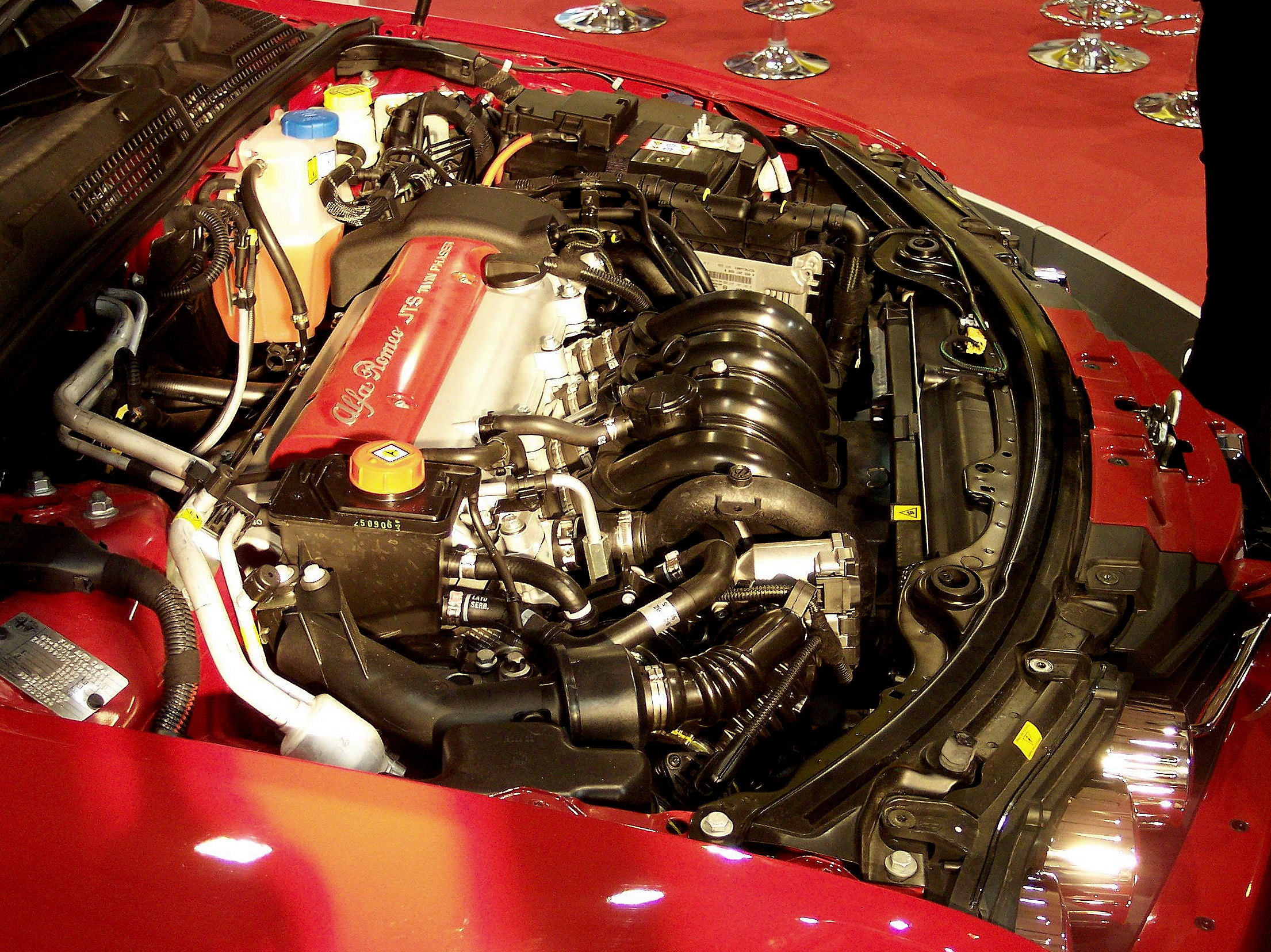
2.2 JTS engine.

With the arrival of 159, a 2.2 JTS was also introduced. The engine block is sourced from GM (Ecotec L61).

- Displacement: 2.2 L (2,198 cc)
- Power: 136 kW (185 PS; 182 hp) at 6500 rpm
- Torque: 230 N⋅m (170 lb⋅ft) at 4500 rpm
- Compression Ratio: 11:3:1

Applications:

- 2005–2010 Alfa Romeo 159
- 2005–2010 Alfa Romeo Brera
- 2006–2010 Alfa Romeo Spider

== Six-cylinder ==
=== 3.2 ===
The JTS direct injection system was first used in a V6 engine in 2005 with the introduction of the Alfa 159 and Brera. This is not related to the Alfa Romeo V6 engine, but is instead a derivation of the GM High Feature engine; built in Australia by GM Holden. While it retains the High Feature engine's 89 mm × 85.6 mm (3.50 in × 3.37 in) bore x stroke and chain driven camshafts, it is modified by Alfa for their performance, fuel economy and sound characteristics. These modifications include: "TwinPhaser" variable valve timing (cam-phasing on both inlet and exhaust cams, thus the name), gasoline direct injection and a higher compression ratio of 11.25:1. It also operates with a lean burn system up to about 1500 rpm, as on many other engines from the company and is capable of generating 191 kW (260 PS; 256 hp), a number matching the larger LY7 3.6 L variant used by GM. Alfa Romeo stopped using the V6 JTS engine in 2010.

- Displacement: 3.2 L; 195.0 cu in (3,195 cc)
- Power: 191 kW (260 PS; 256 hp) at 6200 rpm
- Torque: 322 N⋅m (237 lb⋅ft) at 3800 rpm

Applications:

- 2004 Alfa Romeo Visconti (concept car)
- 2004–2011 Alfa Romeo 159
- 2005–2010 Alfa Romeo Brera
- 2006–2010 Alfa Romeo Spider
