= Alfa Romeo 159 =

Compact executive car

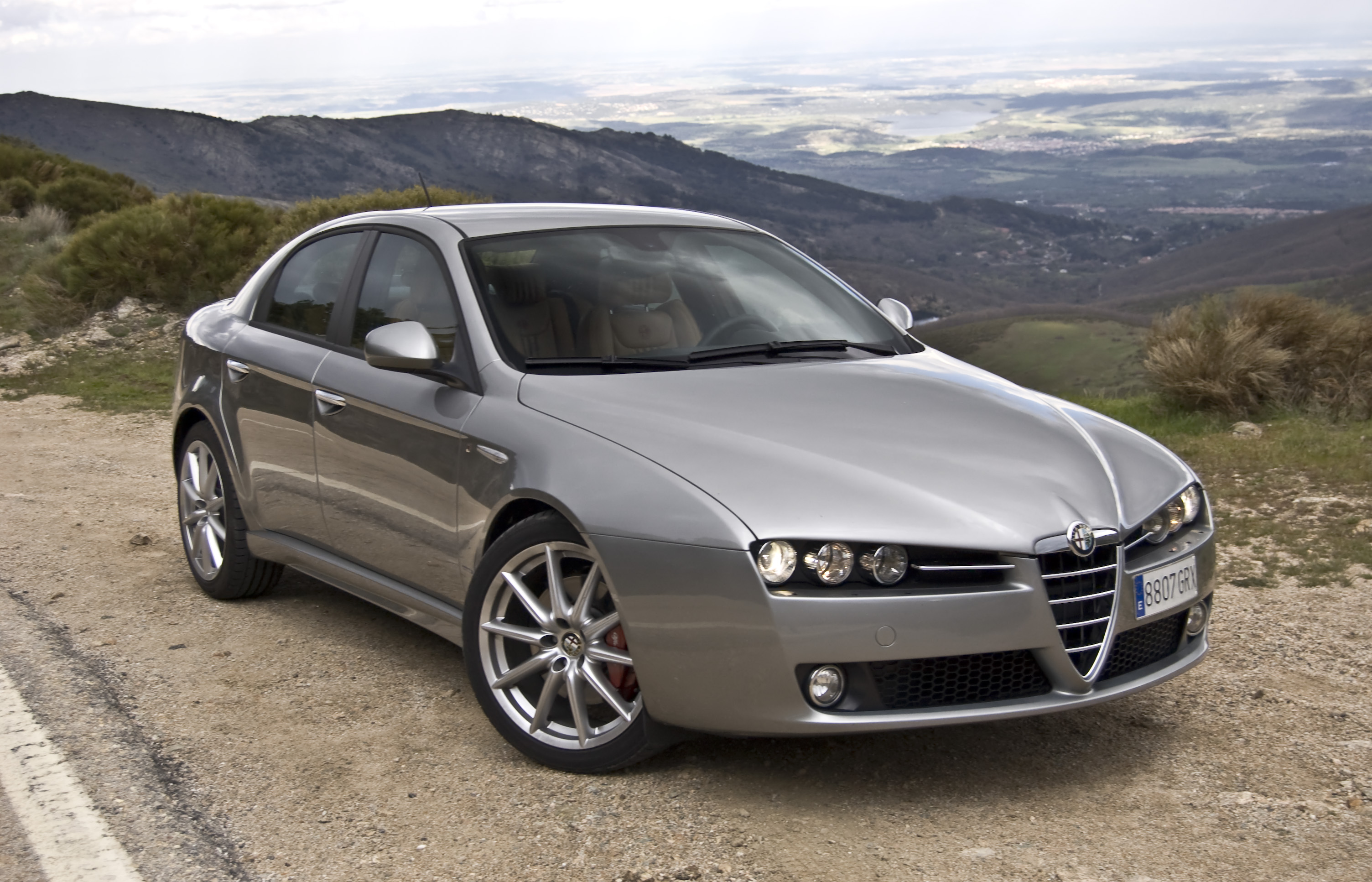
- Alfa Romeo 159 2.0 JTDm ECO Elegante

Overview
- Manufacturer: Alfa Romeo (Note: Fiat Auto (2004–2007) Fiat Group Automobiles (2007–2011))
- Model code: 939
- Production: 2004–2011
- Assembly: Italy: Pomigliano d'Arco
- Designer: Giorgetto Giugiaro at Italdesign; Centro Stile Alfa Romeo (interior)

Body and chassis
- Class: Compact executive car (D)
- Body style: 4-door saloon; 5-door estate
- Layout: Front-engine, front-wheel-drive / four-wheel-drive
- Platform: GM/Fiat Premium
- Related: Alfa Romeo Visconti; Alfa Romeo Brera and Spider

Powertrain
- Engine: Petrol: 1.75 L 1750 TBi turbo 16V I4; 1.8 L Family 1 16V I4; 1.9 L JTS 16V I4; 2.2 L JTS 16V I4; 3.2 L JTS 24V V6; Diesel: 1.9 L JTDm common rail turbo 8V/16V I4; 2.0 L FPT Industrial JTDm common rail turbo-diesel 16V I4; 2.4 L Fiat JTDm common rail turbo-diesel 20V I5
- Transmission: 5-speed manual; 6-speed manual (M32, F40, C635); 6-speed Selespeed automated manual; 6-speed Q-Tronic AWTF-80 SC automatic

Dimensions
- Wheelbase: 2,700 mm (106.3 in)
- Length: 4,660 mm (183.5 in)
- Width: 1,828 mm (72.0 in)
- Height: 1,417 mm (55.8 in)
- Curb weight: 1,385–1,695 kg (3,053–3,737 lb)

Chronology
- Predecessor: Alfa Romeo 156
- Successor: Alfa Romeo Giulia (952)

The Alfa Romeo 159 (Type 939) is a car built by Italian marque Alfa Romeo between 2004 and 2011. It is a large family car in the compact-executive market segment with four-door saloon and five-door estate variants. Introduced at the 2005 Geneva Motor Show as a replacement for the 156, the 159 used the GM/Fiat Premium platform, shared with the Alfa Romeo Brera and Spider as well as the Kamal and Visconti concept cars.

The 159 placed third in the 2006 European Car of the Year awards. Production of the 159 ended in November 2011, with 247,661 cars manufactured. The 159's late transition to what was fundamentally made as an E segment platform resulted in the 159 having excessive weight, a problem shared by the Brera coupé and Spider.

== Styling ==
Sedan or berlina (rear view)

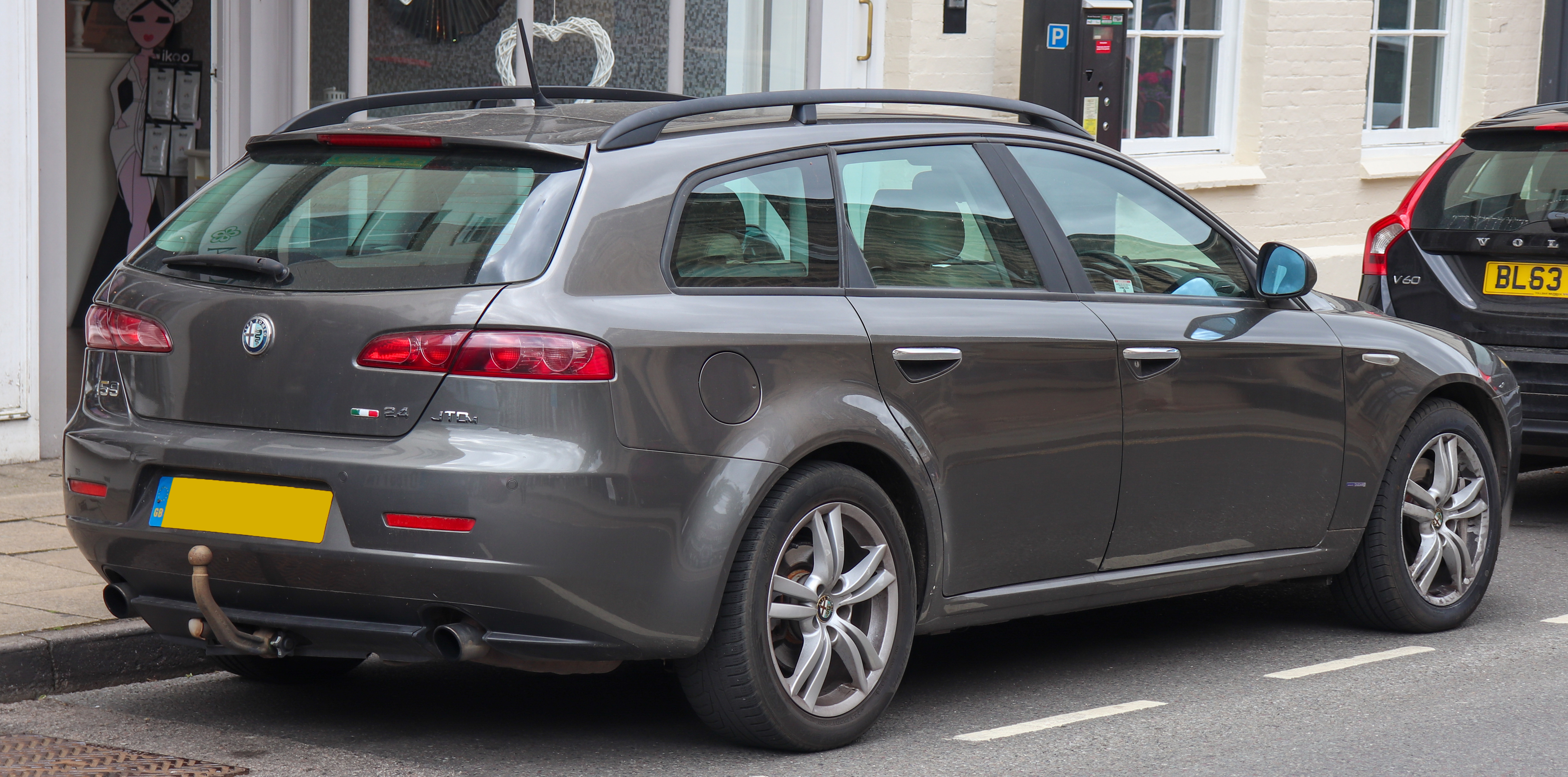
Sportwagon in Lusso trim (rear view)

The 159 was designed by Giorgetto Giugiaro in collaboration with the Centro Stile Alfa Romeo. The nose features a traditional Alfa Romeo V-shaped grille and bonnet, as well as cylindrical headlight clusters. Similar to its coupé counterpart, the front of the car was influenced by the 2002 Brera Concept also designed by Giugiaro, as Fiat asked Giugiaro to transfer the design of the latter on its future saloon.

A high waistline broadens until it reaches the rear "C" pillar. Several exterior design cues were intended to make the car appear larger, supposedly to appeal to potential buyers in the United States; where the 159 was ultimately never marketed.

Initial Centro Stile proposals of Tipo 939 exterior from 2001 were rejected but the interior design would be developed further. The interior recalls styling elements from earlier cars, including the 156, such as deeply recessed instruments angled toward the driver. Alfa Romeo intended for the 159 to compete more directly with BMW, Mercedes-Benz, and Audi by using higher-quality interior materials.

== Model year changes ==
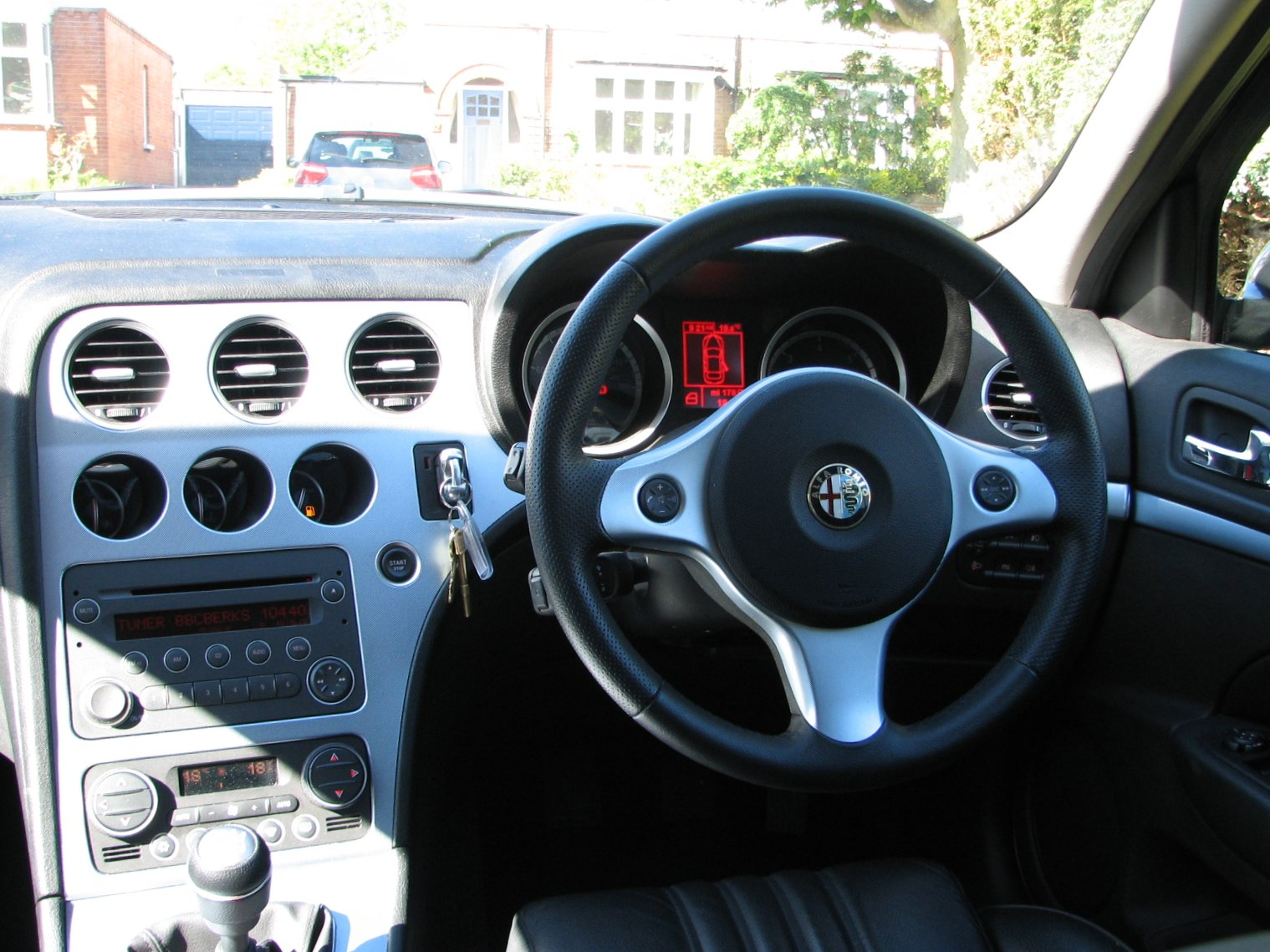
Interior view

Several levels of trim were available depending on the market. Four trim levels namely Progression, Distinctive, Exclusive, and Turismo Internazionale (TI) were generally available. In the United Kingdom, there were three available levels of trim: Turismo, Lusso, and Turismo Internazionale (TI). Among other options, the 159 was also available with the Blue&Me infotainment system.

A Sportwagon variant was introduced at the Geneva Motor Show in March 2006. An automatic gearbox option for the 2.4 JTDM diesel model was also launched that year and later extended to other versions. In 2007, a four-wheel-drive diesel model was introduced, and the 2.4-litre diesel engines' power output was increased to 210 PS (154 kW; 207 hp), with a newly reintroduced TI trim level also available as an option.

For the 2008 model year, the mechanics and interiors of the 159 were further developed. Dashboard, instrumentation, and other aluminium components, reduced kerb weight by 45 kg (99 lb). A 3.2-litre V6 model was offered in front-wheel-drive configuration, achieving a top speed of 250 km/h (155 mph). All model variants were now equipped with Alfa Romeo's electronic "Q2" limited slip differential. The revised 159 range was introduced at the Geneva Motor Show in March 2008.

For the 2009 model year, Alfa Romeo introduced a turbocharged petrol engine variant badge as "TBi", this 1,742 cc unit has direct injection and variable valve timing in both inlet and exhaust cams. This new engine is rated at 200 PS (147 kW; 197 hp) and 320 N⋅m (236 lbf⋅ft) of torque. Eventually this unit would replace the GM derived 2.2 and 1.9 JTS units. Also in the same year, a new 170 PS (125 kW; 168 hp) JTDm diesel engine became available.

The 159 was discontinued in the United Kingdom on 8 July 2011.

== Powertrain ==
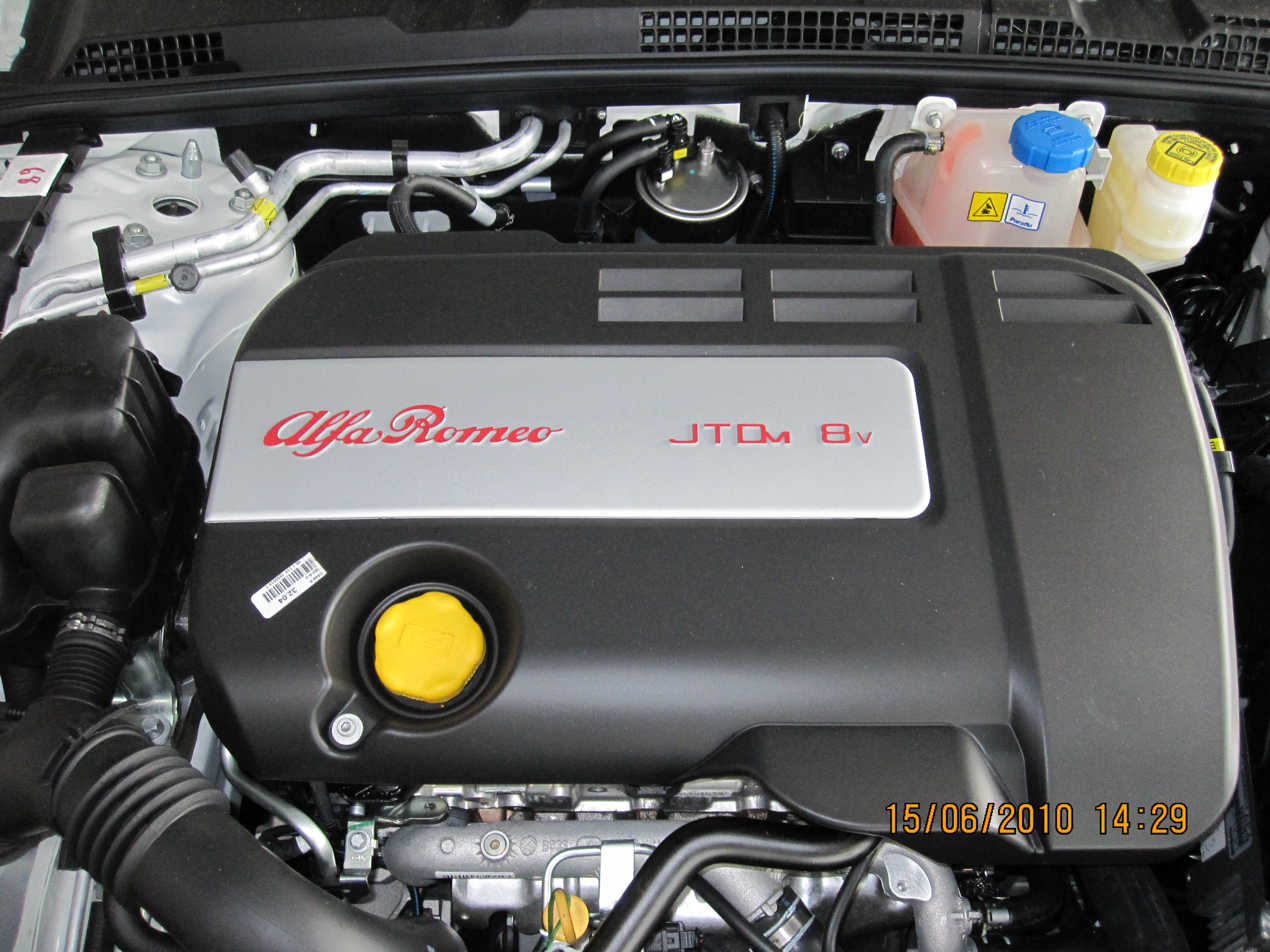
Alfa Romeo JTDm

The 159 was available in both front and four-wheel drive configurations. The "Q4" four-wheel-drive system utilises a Torsen Type-C twin-differential (front and centre differential in the same unit with an open front differential) and was available on the 3.2-litre petrol and 2.4-litre diesel engines.

Due to its platform, the 159 is 225 mm (8.9 in) longer, 85 mm (3.3 in) wider than its predecessor. The considerable growth in dimensions deterred many 156 owners from considering the 159 as a direct replacement model. Thanks to its new platform, a high level of passive safety was achieved, and the torsional rigidity of the chassis reached 180.000 daNm/rad.

The gearbox is a six-speed manual on most models (with the 1.8-litre model having a five-speed manual), and a six-speed automatic Q-Tronic gearbox (Aisin AW TF-80SC) was available for the 1.9 diesel, 2.4 diesel, and 3.2 petrol models. The Selespeed automated manual gearbox was available in some markets with the 2.2 petrol engine.

All petrol engines featured direct fuel injection (except the 1.8l), named as JTS (Jet Thrust Stoichiometric). JTD diesel engines have common rail direct fuel injection.

=== Specifications ===
Model	Engine	Displacement	Power	Torque	Comp. ratio	Years
Petrol engines
1.75 TBi	I4	1,742 cc	200 PS (147 kW; 197 hp) at 5,000 rpm	320 N⋅m (236 lb⋅ft) at 1,400 rpm	9.5:1	2009–2011
1.8	I4	1,796 cc	140 PS (103 kW; 138 hp) at 6,500 rpm	175 N⋅m (129 lb⋅ft) at 3,800 rpm	10.5:1	2007–2010
1.9 JTS	I4	1,859 cc	160 PS (118 kW; 158 hp) at 6,500 rpm	190 N⋅m (140 lb⋅ft) at 4,500 rpm	11.3:1	2005–2007
2.2 JTS	I4	2,198 cc	185 PS (136 kW; 182 hp) at 6,500 rpm	230 N⋅m (170 lb⋅ft) at 4,500 rpm	11.3:1	2005–2010
3.2 V6 JTS Q4	V6	3,195 cc	260 PS (191 kW; 256 hp) at 6,200 rpm	322 N⋅m (237 lb⋅ft) at 3,800 rpm	11.25:1	2005–2010
Diesel engines
1.9 JTDM 8V	I4	1,910 cc	120 PS (88 kW; 118 hp) at 4,000 rpm	280 N⋅m (207 lb⋅ft) at 2,000 rpm	18:1	2005–2010
1.9 JTDM 16V	I4	1,910 cc	150 PS (110 kW; 148 hp) at 4,000 rpm	320 N⋅m (236 lb⋅ft) at 2,000 rpm	17.5:1	2005–2010
2.0 JTDM 16V	I4	1,956 cc	136 PS (100 kW; 134 hp) at 4,000 rpm	350 N⋅m (258 lb⋅ft) at 1,750 rpm	16.5:1	2010–2011
2.0 JTDM 16V	I4	1,956 cc	170 PS (125 kW; 168 hp) at 4,000 rpm	360 N⋅m (266 lb⋅ft) at 1,750 rpm	16.5:1	2009–2011
2.4 JTDM	I5	2,387 cc	200 PS (147 kW; 197 hp) at 4,000 rpm	400 N⋅m (295 lb⋅ft) at 2,000 rpm	17:1	2005–2007
2.4 JTDM	I5	2,387 cc	210 PS (154 kW; 207 hp) at 4,000 rpm	400 N⋅m (295 lb⋅ft) at 1,500 rpm	17:1	2007–2010

=== Performance ===
Engine	Top speed km/h (mph)		0–100 km/h (seconds) 0–62 mph (seconds)		Combined consumption		Years
Engine	manual	automatic	manual	automatic	manual	automatic	Years
1.75 TBi	235 (146)		7.7		8.1 L/100 km (35 mpg_{‑imp}; 29 mpg_{‑US})		2009–2011
1.8	206 (128)		10.2		7.7 L/100 km (37 mpg_{‑imp}; 31 mpg_{‑US})		2005–2007
1.8	208 (129)		10.2		7.6 L/100 km (37 mpg_{‑imp}; 31 mpg_{‑US})		2008–2010
1.9 JTDM 8V	191 (119)		11.0		5.9 L/100 km (48 mpg_{‑imp}; 40 mpg_{‑US})		2005–2007
1.9 JTDM 8V	193 (120)		10.7		5.9 L/100 km (48 mpg_{‑imp}; 40 mpg_{‑US})		2008–2010
1.9 JTDM 16V	210 (130)	210 (130)	9.4	9.4	6.0 L/100 km (47 mpg_{‑imp}; 39 mpg_{‑US})	7.1 L/100 km (40 mpg_{‑imp}; 33 mpg_{‑US})	2005–2007
1.9 JTDM 16V	212 (131)	209 (130)	9.2	9.5	5.9 L/100 km (48 mpg_{‑imp}; 40 mpg_{‑US})	7.1 L/100 km (40 mpg_{‑imp}; 33 mpg_{‑US})	2008–2010
2.0 JTDM 16V 136 PS	202 (135)		9.9		5.1 L/100 km (55 mpg_{‑imp}; 46 mpg_{‑US})		2010–2011
2.0 JTDM 16V 170 PS	218 (135)		8.8		5.4 L/100 km (52 mpg_{‑imp}; 44 mpg_{‑US})		2009–2011
1.9 JTS	212 (132)		9.7		8.7 L/100 km (32 mpg_{‑imp}; 27 mpg_{‑US})		2005–2007
1.9 JTS	214 (133)		9.5		8.7 L/100 km (32 mpg_{‑imp}; 27 mpg_{‑US})		2008–2010
2.2 JTS	222 (138)		8.8		9.4 L/100 km (30 mpg_{‑imp}; 25 mpg_{‑US})		2005–2007
2.2 JTS	224 (139)		8.7		9.2 L/100 km (31 mpg_{‑imp}; 26 mpg_{‑US})		2008–2010
2.2 JTS Selespeed	222 (138)		8.8		9.2 L/100 km (31 mpg_{‑imp}; 26 mpg_{‑US})		2005–2007
2.2 JTS Selespeed	224 (139)		8.7		9.1 L/100 km (31 mpg_{‑imp}; 26 mpg_{‑US})		2008–2010
2.4 JTDM	228 (142)	224 (139)	8.4	8.4	6.8 L/100 km (42 mpg_{‑imp}; 35 mpg_{‑US})	8.0 L/100 km (35 mpg_{‑imp}; 29 mpg_{‑US})	2005–2007
2.4 JTDM (210 PS)	231 (143)		8.1		6.8 L/100 km (42 mpg_{‑imp}; 35 mpg_{‑US})		2008–2010
2.4 JTDM (200 PS Q-Tronic)		225 (140)		8.3		7.9 L/100 km (36 mpg_{‑imp}; 30 mpg_{‑US})	2008–2010
2.4 JTDM (210 PS)	230 (143)		8.2		6.8 L/100 km (42 mpg_{‑imp}; 35 mpg_{‑US})		2007–2010
2.4 JTDM Q4 (210 PS)	226 (141)		8.4		7.5 L/100 km (38 mpg_{‑imp}; 31 mpg_{‑US})		2005–2007
2.4 JTDM Q4 (210 PS)	227 (141)		8.3		7.2 L/100 km (39 mpg_{‑imp}; 33 mpg_{‑US})		2008–2010
3.2 V6 JTS Q4	240 (149)	240 (149)	7.0	7.2	11.5 L/100 km (25 mpg_{‑imp}; 20.5 mpg_{‑US})	12.2 L/100 km (23.2 mpg_{‑imp}; 19.3 mpg_{‑US})	2005–2007
3.2 V6 JTS FWD	250 (155)		7.1		11.0 L/100 km (26 mpg_{‑imp}; 21.4 mpg_{‑US})		2008–2010
3.2 V6 JTS Q4	244 (151)	242 (150)	7.0	7.2	11.4 L/100 km (25 mpg_{‑imp}; 20.6 mpg_{‑US})	12.1 L/100 km (23.3 mpg_{‑imp}; 19.4 mpg_{‑US})	2008–2010
Note: Consumption figures according to European Commission Directive 1999/100/EC.

== Safety ==
The 159 is fitted with seven airbags as a standard, with additional knee airbags also available as an option. The car performed well in rear end crash protection tests, benefiting from "anti whiplash" seats.

ANCAP test results Alfa Romeo 159 (2006)
Test	Score
Overall	5 /5 stars
Frontal offset	15.47/16
Side impact	14.36/16
Pole	2/2
Seat belt reminders	2/3
Whiplash protection	Not Assessed
Pedestrian protection	Poor
Electronic stability control	Standard

The 159 passed the Euro NCAP car safety tests with following ratings:

Euro NCAP test results Alfa Romeo 159 (2006)
Test	Score	Rating
Adult occupant:		5 /5 stars
Child occupant:		4 /5 stars
Pedestrian:		1 /4 stars

== Awards ==
- Auto Bild Design Award 2006
- Design Award in the 2006 Fleet World Honours
- Die Besten Autos 2007 Import category (Auto, Motor und Sport)
- L'Automobile più Bella del Mondo

== Motorsport ==
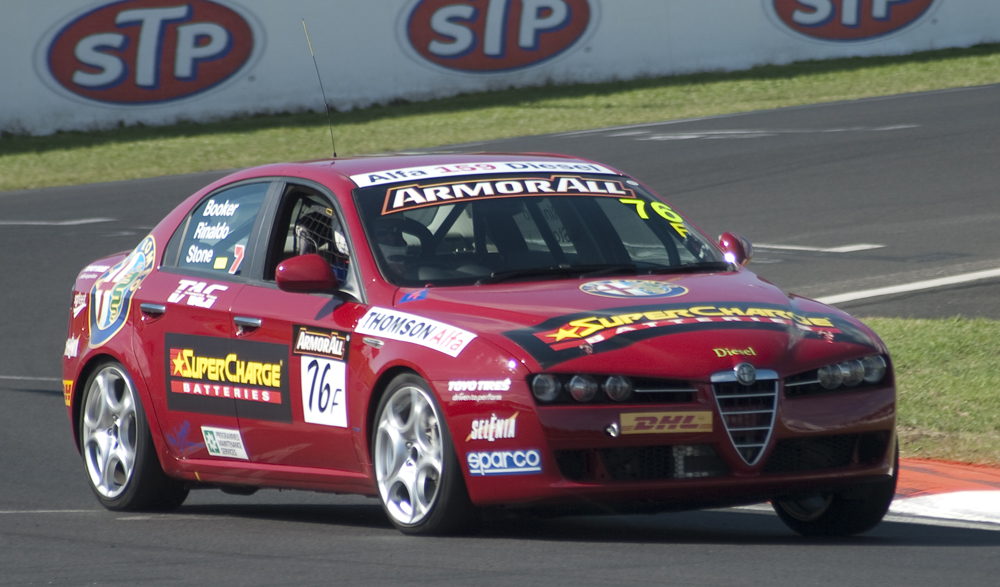
Alfa Romeo 159 JTDm in the 2007 WPS Bathurst 12 Hour

The 159 contested the Bathurst 12 Hour race for production cars in 2007, 2009 and 2010. Competing with the 2.4-litre JTDM diesel engine, it won the Alternative Energy Class in each of these three races.
