= Alfa Romeo Brera and Spider =

Italian sports car series

Alfa Romeo Brera Alfa Romeo Spider
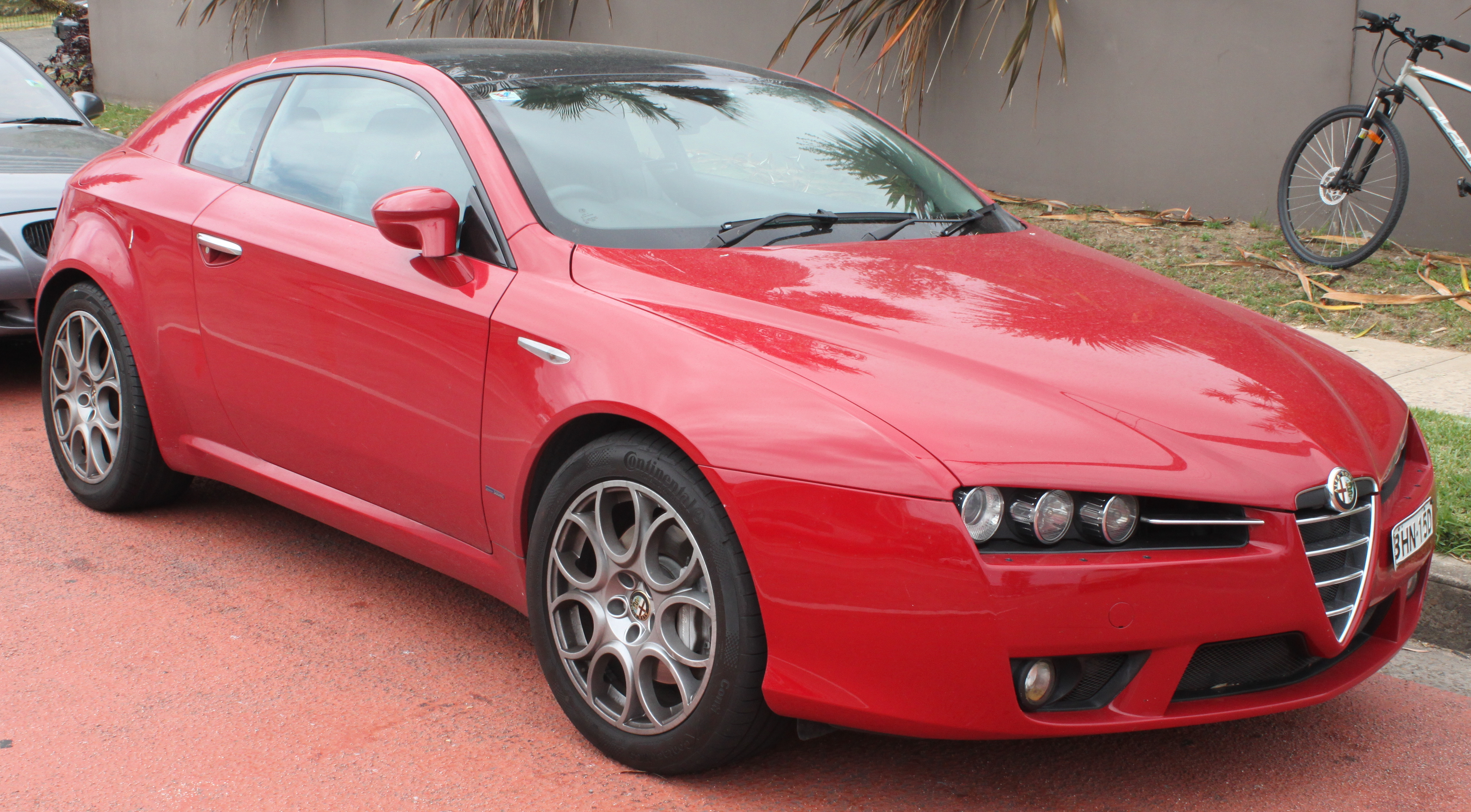

Overview
- Manufacturer: Alfa Romeo (Note: Fiat Auto (2005–2007) Fiat Group Automobiles (2007–2010))
- Model code: 939
- Production: 2005–2010 (Brera); 2006–2010 (Spider)
- Assembly: Italy: San Giorgio Canavese, Turin (Pininfarina)
- Designer: Giorgetto Giugiaro at Italdesign (Brera); Pininfarina and Centro Stile Alfa Romeo (Spider); Centro Stile Alfa Romeo (interior)

Body and chassis
- Class: Sports car (S)
- Body style: 3-door 2+2 coupé (Brera); 2-door roadster (Spider)
- Layout: Front-engine, front-wheel-drive; Front-engine, all-wheel-drive (Q4)
- Platform: GM/Fiat Premium
- Related: Alfa Romeo 159

Powertrain
- Engine: Petrol: 1.75 L 1750 TBi turbo I4 16V; 2.2 L JTS I4 16V; 3.2 L JTS V6 24V; Diesel: 2.0 L JTDm turbo-diesel I4 16V; 2.4 L JTDm turbo-diesel I5 20V
- Transmission: 6-speed manual; 6-speed Selespeed automated manual; 6-speed Q-Tronic Aisin AWTF-80 SC automatic

Dimensions
- Wheelbase: 2,528 mm (99.5 in)
- Length: 4,410 mm (174 in) (Brera); 4,393 mm (173.0 in) (Spider)
- Width: 1,830 mm (72 in)
- Height: 1,341 mm (52.8 in) (Brera); 1,318 mm (51.9 in) (Spider)
- Curb weight: 1,430–1,625 kg (3,153–3,583 lb)

Chronology
- Predecessor: Alfa Romeo GTV and Spider (916)

The Alfa Romeo Brera and the Alfa Romeo Spider (Type 939) are sports cars/grand tourers using the GM/Fiat Premium platform, manufactured by Pininfarina and marketed by Alfa Romeo as a 2+2 coupé and roadster respectively.

12,488 units of the Spider and 21,786 units of the Brera were made with production ending in late 2010 and inventory remaining into 2011.

The name 'Brera' appears to come from the Brera district of Milan, which is known for being an artistic area and is sometimes referred to as the 'Milanese Montmartre'. Alfa Romeo was established in Milan in 1910.

== Concept ==
The Brera was originally unveiled as a concept car at the 2002 Geneva Motor Show, designed by Giorgetto Giugiaro of Italdesign Giugiaro. The concept was powered by a Maserati V8 engine rated at around 400 PS (294 kW; 395 hp). The Brera received positive feedback, and Alfa Romeo subsequently announced production plans for 2005. In 2004, Giorgetto Giugiaro was awarded the Compasso d'Oro industrial design award for his Brera Concept.

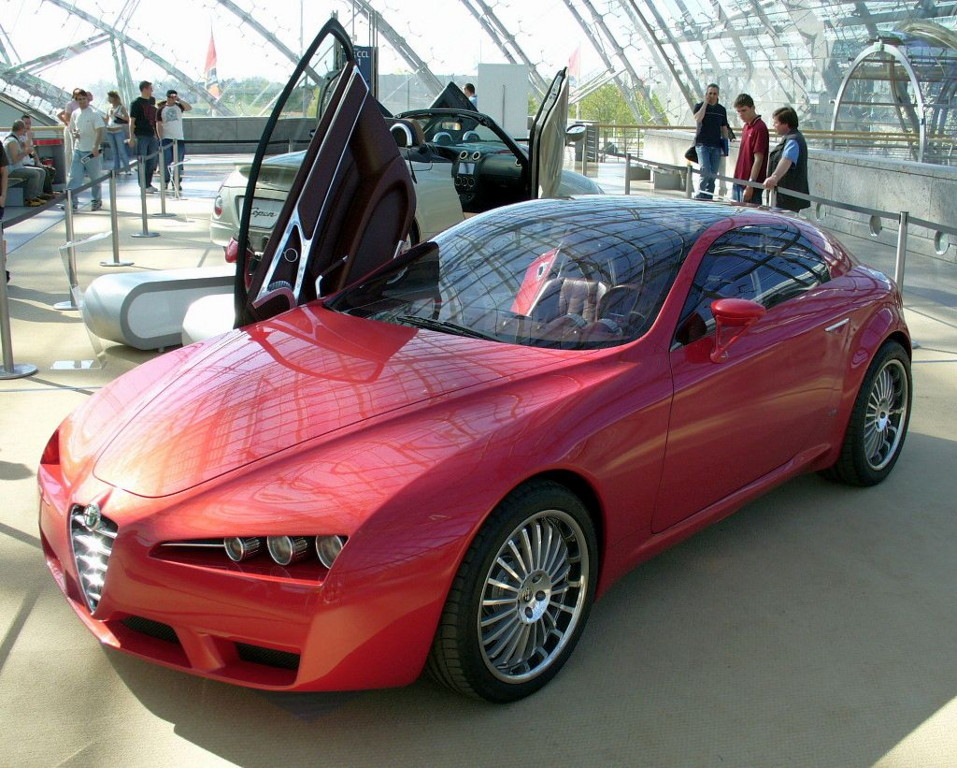
The Brera concept car

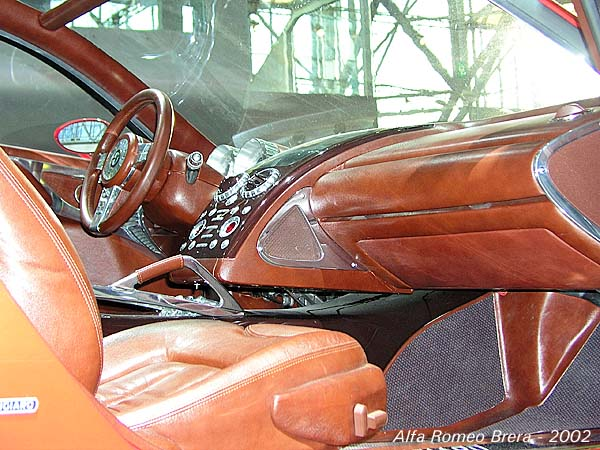
Interior

== Production ==
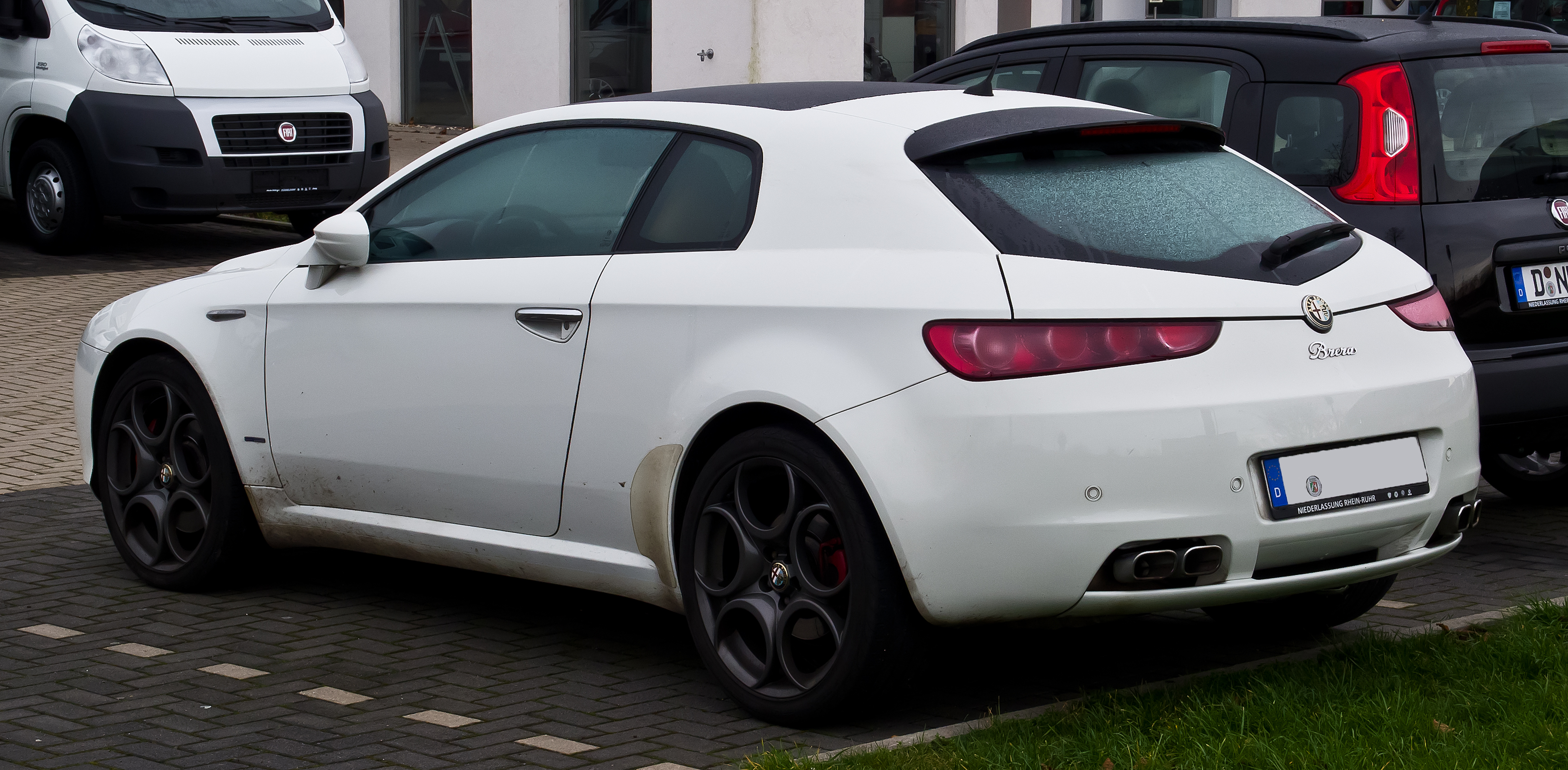
Rear view (Brera coupe)

The Alfa Romeo Brera was introduced in production form at the 2005 Geneva Motor Show. It translated the original's exterior appearance on a much smaller scale, becoming a grand tourer on the GM/Fiat Premium platform (shared with the Alfa Romeo 159), and designed to replace the outgoing GTV. A convertible version of the Brera called the Spider was also announced, to be launched shortly after the coupe to replace the existing GTV-based Spider.

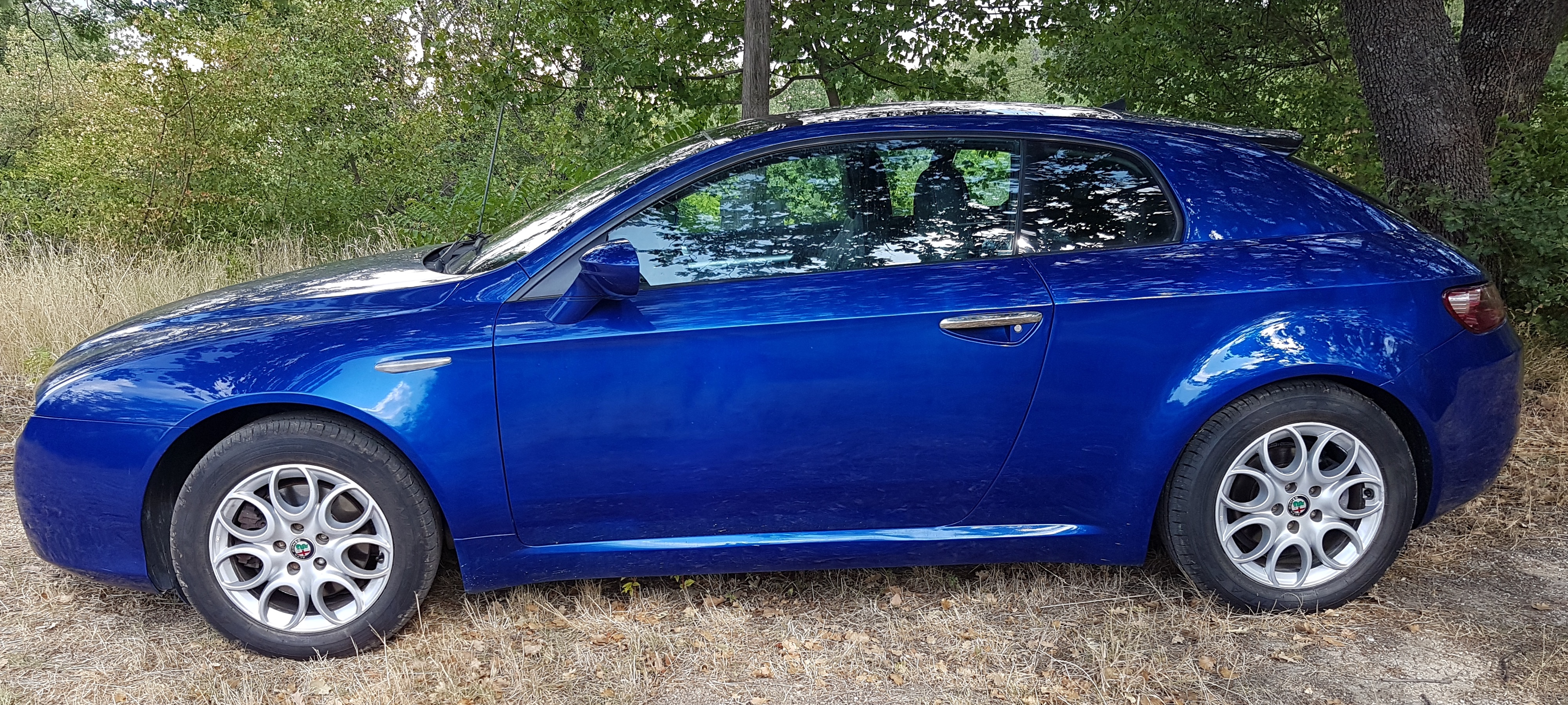
Alfa Romeo Brera (side view)

In Europe, the Brera was initially available with two petrol engines, the 185 PS (136 kW; 182 hp) 2.2-litre JTS and 260 PS (191 kW; 256 hp) 3.2-litre V6; and a 200 PS (147 kW; 197 hp) 2.4-litre JTD turbodiesel. Cars with the diesel or 2.2 petrol were front-wheel drive, whilst the V6 came with a Torsen four-wheel drive system similar to the 159's Q4.

At the 2008 Geneva Motor Show Alfa Romeo introduced updated versions of the Brera and Spider respectively. The 3.2 liter V6 version became available in front-wheel-drive form, allowing for a top speed of 250 km/h (155 mph); all model variants adopted the e-Q2 electronic limited-slip differential; the use of aluminium for various parts of the car helped reduce weight.

The following year, again at the Geneva Motor Show, an all-new turbocharged petrol engine model badged as 1750 TBi (Turbo Benzina iniezione) was added to the lineup. This 1,742 cc unit featured direct injection and variable valve timing on both inlet and exhaust cams, and developed 200 PS (147 kW; 197 hp) and 320 N⋅m (236 lbf⋅ft) of torque.

=== Production totals ===
Brera/Spider production figures*
Model	2005	2006	2007	2008	2009	2010	Totals
Brera	1,630	8,248	4,795	3,770	1,629	1,589	21,661
Spider	0	2,838	4,535	2,559	999	1,432	12,363

*stated by Pininfarina production records

== Trims ==
As with its predecessor, the Brera was initially available with two trim levels: 'Medium' and 'Sky View', the latter's name being derived from the panoramic glass roof available for the Brera's top specification. In 2008 a special trim was introduced; called the TI (Turismo Internazionale), featuring 19" alloy wheels, special badges on the front fenders and inside the front headrests. Alongside the bigger wheels, there were bigger Brembo brakes and stiffer shocks and springs.

=== Brera S ===
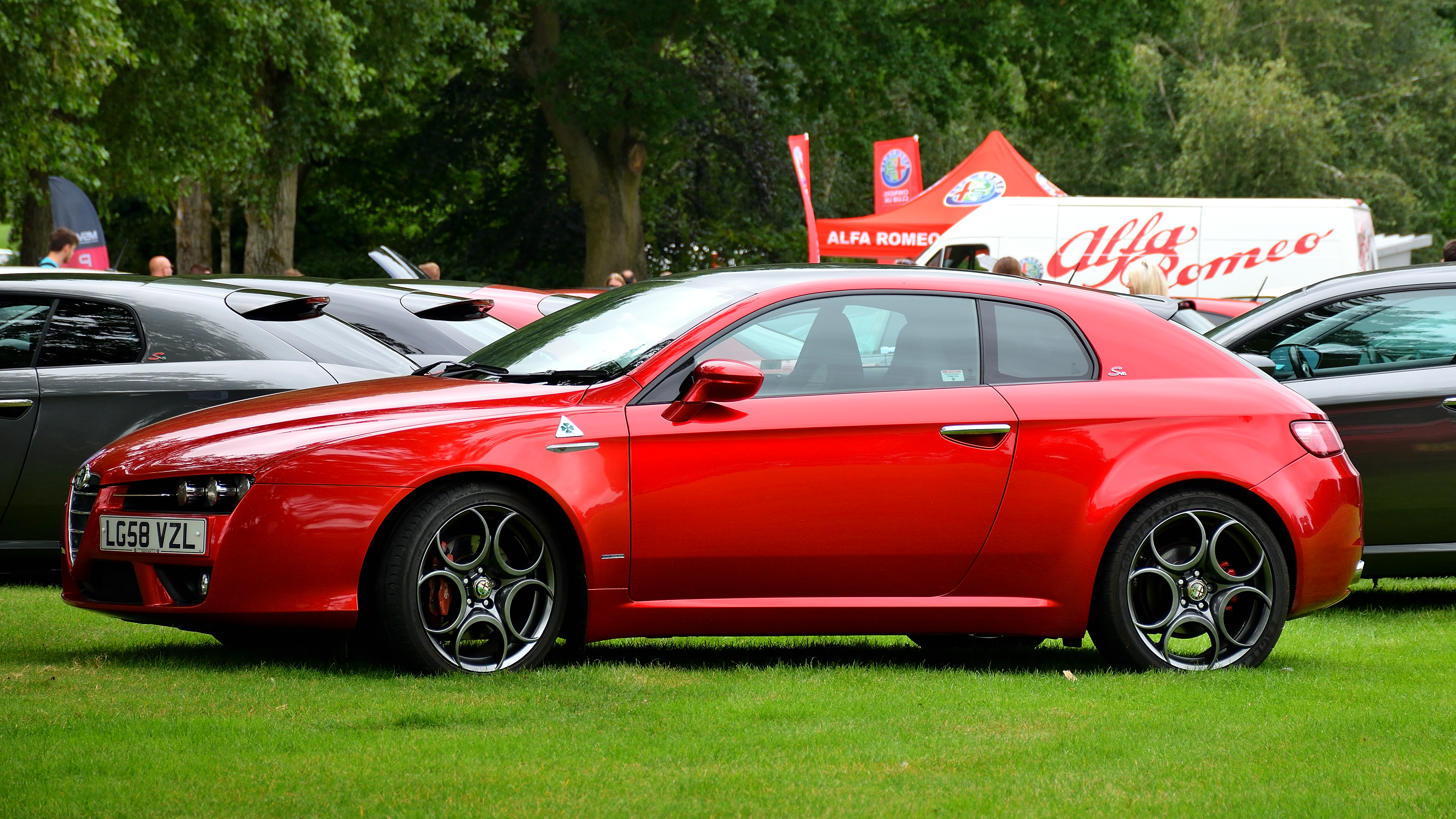
Brera S

In Spring 2008 the Brera 'S' Special Edition was announced. This Alfa Romeo-approved British-only limited-run version was developed by British engineering specialists Prodrive and was intended to address criticism regarding the handling of the standard car. 500 units of the Brera S were made. The Brera S was developed in 12 months and suspension and chassis components and settings of the 'S' were amended from the standard car, altering the handling characteristics. These include Bilstein and Eibach suspension, Prodrive sports exhaust and special 19" wheels and trim. Alfa Romeo and Prodrive had previously collaborated in motorsport, campaigning an Alfa Romeo 155 in the BTCC during 1995. Curiously, the standard glass roof was blanked off with headlining on this version.

=== Brera Italia Independent ===
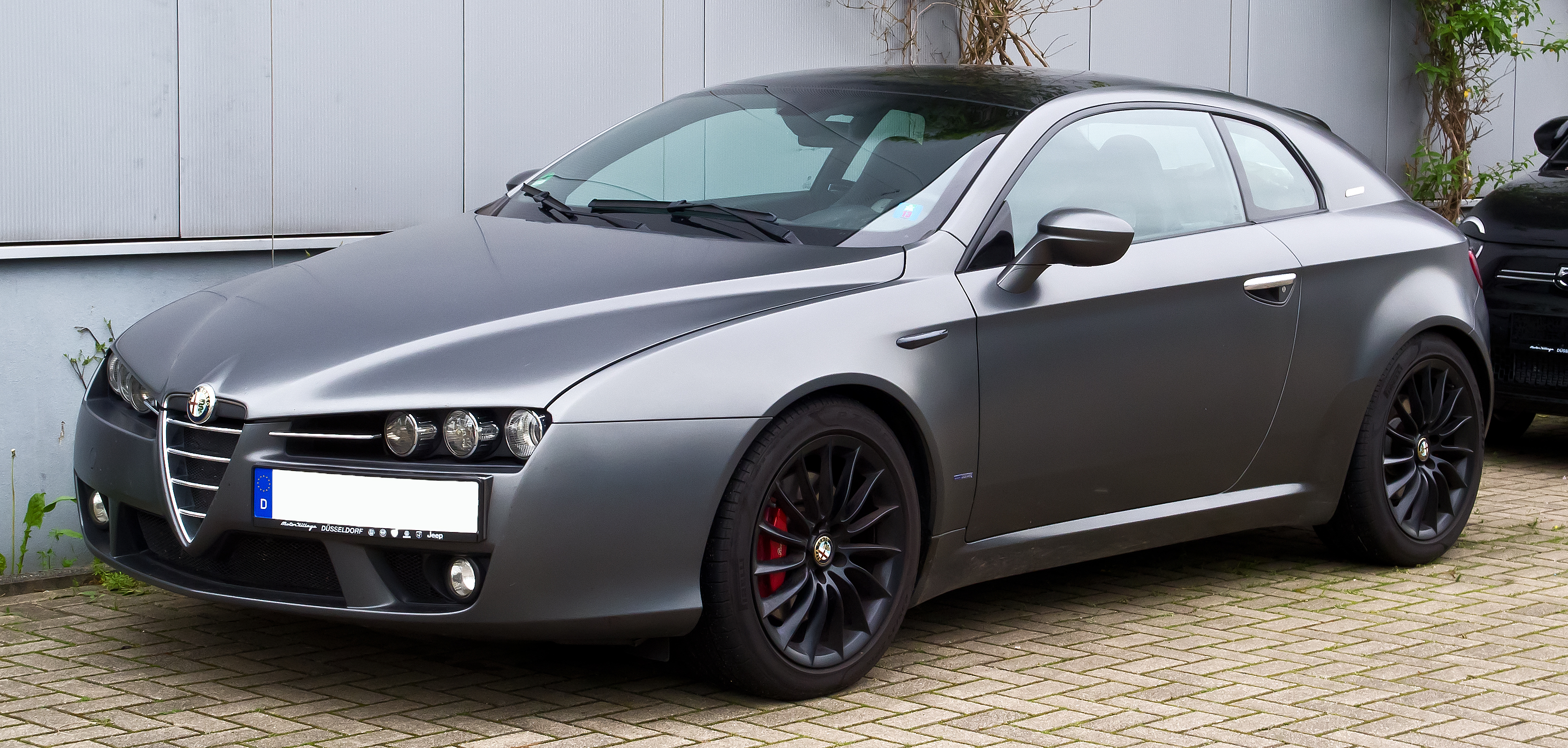
Brera Italia Independent

In 2009, Alfa Romeo released a limited edition of the Brera and Spider in association with Italia Independent, an Italian design company owned and run by Lapo Elkann, grandson of Gianni Agnelli of the Fiat empire. Limited to 900 units and named after Alfa Romeo's partner in the venture, the Italia Independent edition of the Brera was offered with opaque-finish titanium paintwork, 18" "turbine" style alloy wheels, and an aluminium fuel-filler cap. The interior had a Sat-Nav system as standard and the interior had a carbon-fiber trim.

The Italia Independent was offered with 125 kW (170 PS) 2.0 JTDM, 154 kW (210 PS) 2.4 JTDM diesel,157 kW (214 PS) 2.4 JTDM diesel (2009–10) or 147 kW (200 PS) 1.8 TBi, 136 kW (185 PS) 2.2 JTS, 191 kW (260 PS) 3.2 V6 petrol engines and six-speed transmission. A conventional 6-speed manual, the "Selespeed" automated manual, and the Q-Tronic automatic transmission options were offered, and the V6 engine was also available with Alfa Romeo's Q4 all-wheel drive system.

== Spider ==
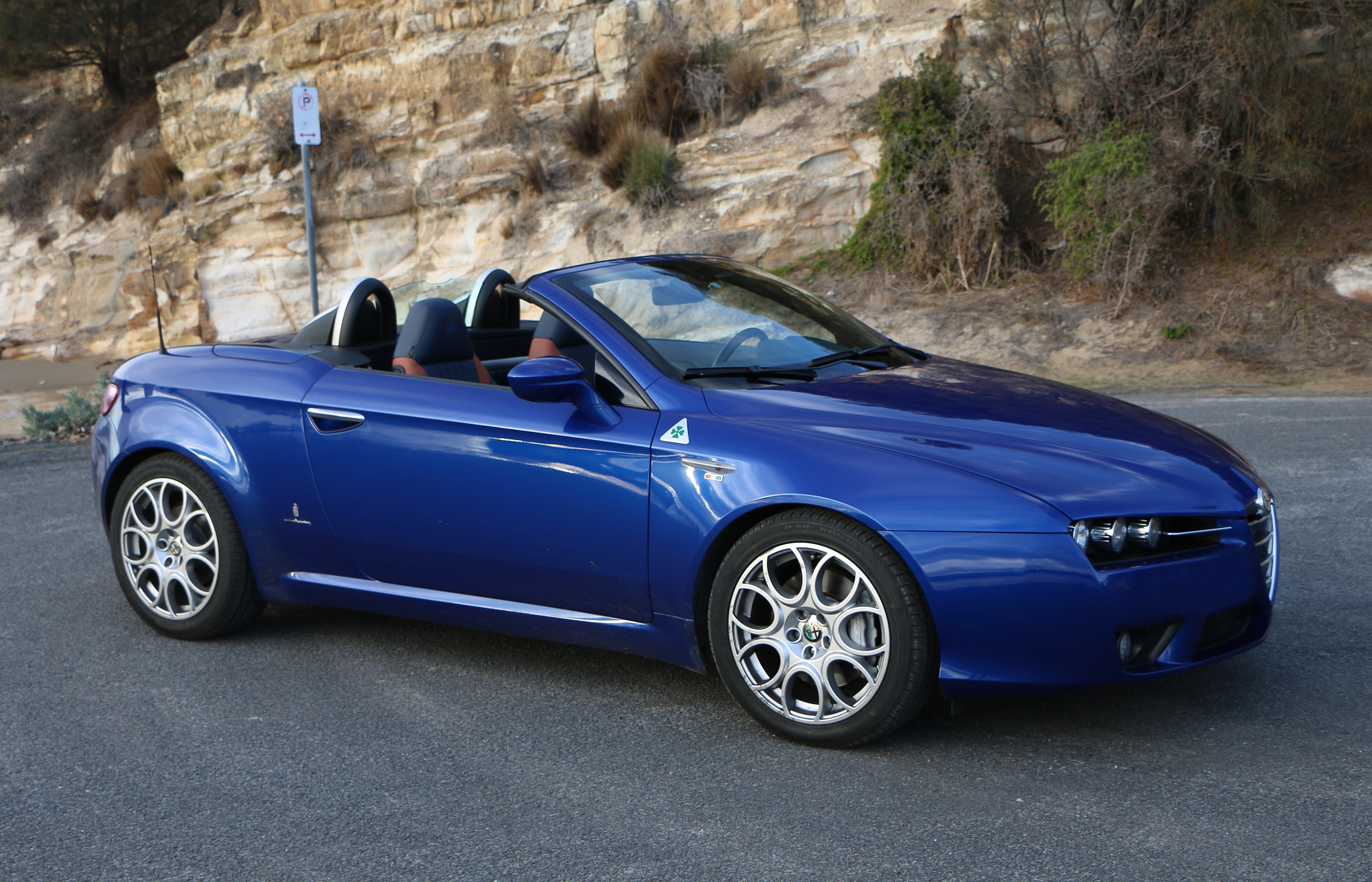
Alfa Romeo Spider

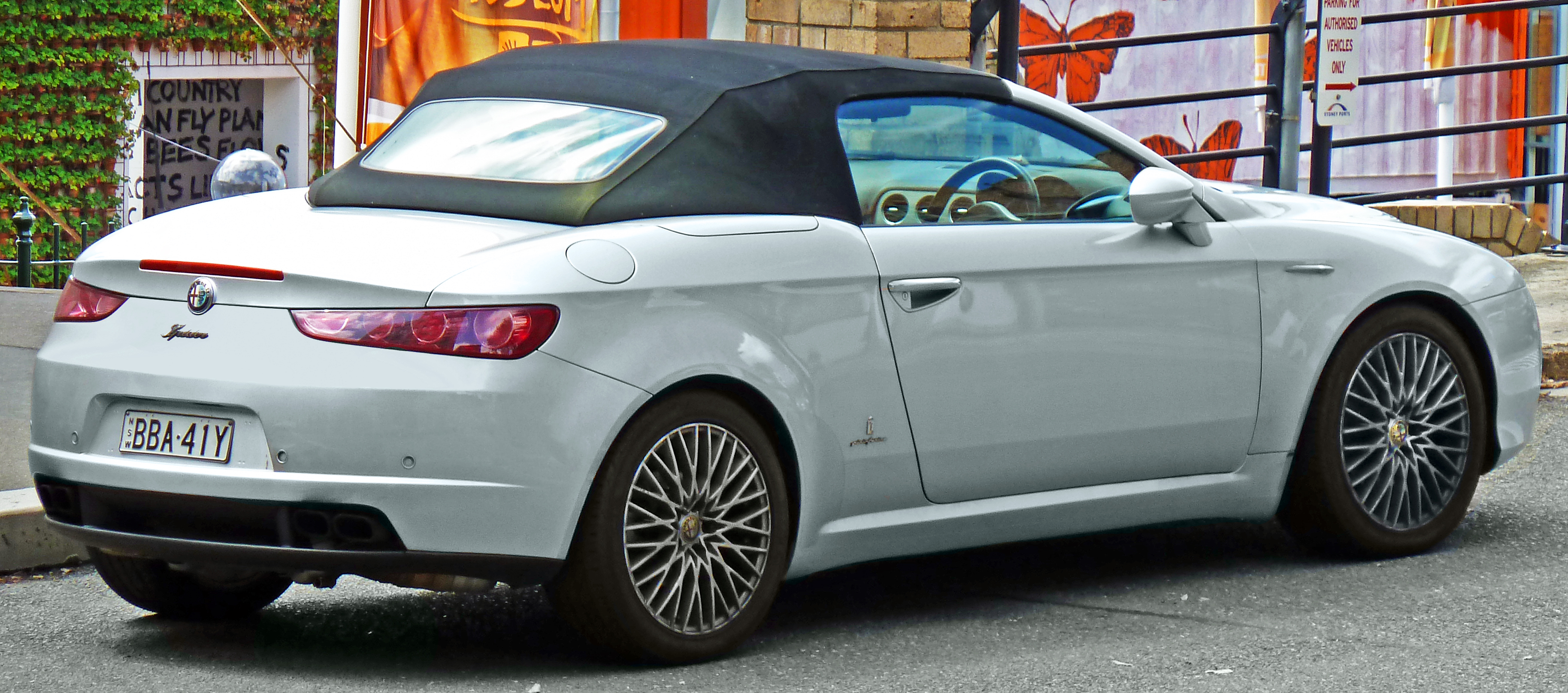
Rear view (roof in place)

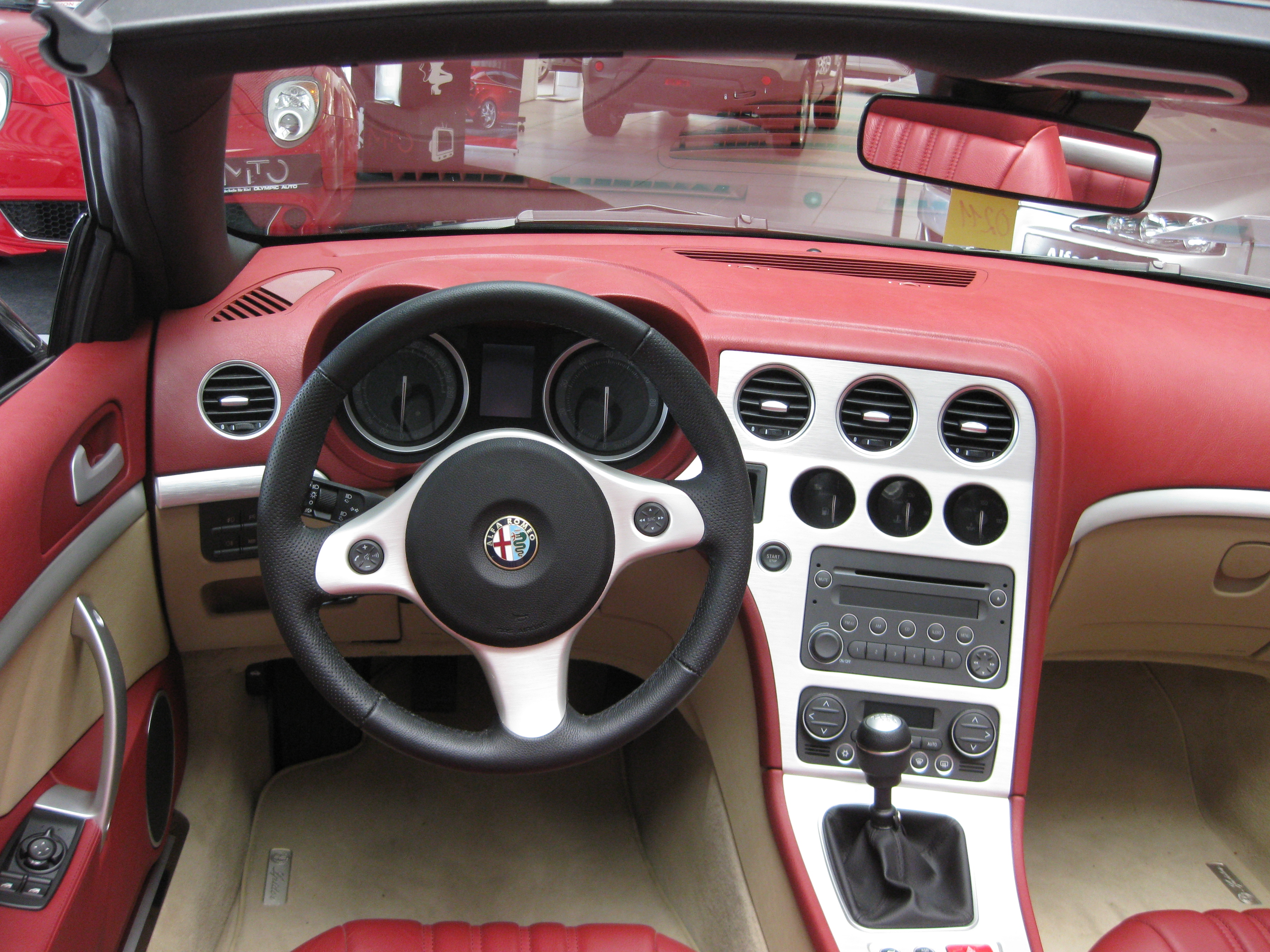
Interior

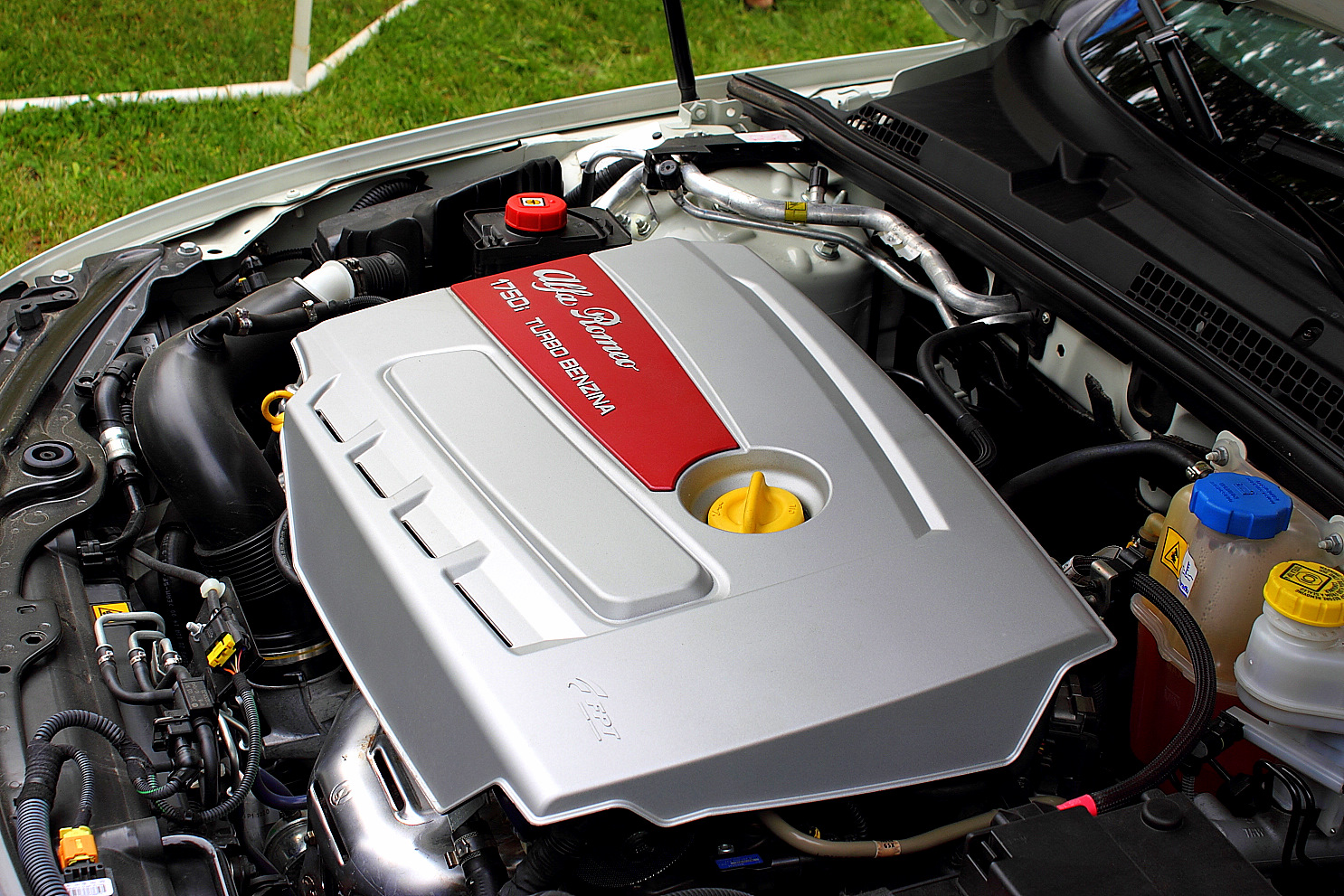
The 1,750 cc turbocharged straight-4 engine in the Spider

The New Spider version (Type 939) was introduced at the 2006 Geneva Motor Show, where it also received the "Cabrio of the Year" award. The Spider is based on the Brera coupe, seating two passengers rather than four passengers as in the coupe. Originally Alfa Romeo offered two engines: the 2.2 L straight-4 and 3.2 L V6 JTS engines — the JTD common rail turbodiesel was introduced at the 2007 Geneva Motor Show. This car replaced the GTV Spider, which was introduced in 1995.

The 939 Spider can be viewed as the 6th generation of Alfa Romeo Spiders, the first version of which was released in 1966. Production ended in November 2010.

=== Italia Independent ===
In 2009, Alfa Romeo unveiled a limited edition of the Brera and Spider in association with Italia Independent. Limited to 900 units and named after Alfa Romeo's partner in the venture, the Italia Independent edition of the Brera was offered with opaque-finish titanium paintwork, 18" "turbine" style alloy wheels, and an aluminium fuel-filler cap.

The Italia Independent was offered with 125 kW (170 PS) 2.0 JTDM, 154 kW (210 PS) 2.4 JTDM diesel, JTDM, 157 kW (214 PS) 2.4 JTDM diesel or 147 kW (200 PS) 1.8 TBi, 136 kW (185 PS) 2.2 JTS or 191 kW (260 PS) 3.2 V6 petrol engines and six-speed transmission. A conventional 6-speed manual, the "Selespeed" automated manual, and the Q-Tronic automatic transmission options were offered, and the V6 engined-car was also available with Alfa Romeo's Q4 all-wheel drive system.

=== Spider 'Mille Miglia' ===
Alfa Romeo has created a special edition of its Spider convertible in order to commemorate the historic Mille Miglia 1,000-mile race that takes place in Italy annually. The carmaker built just 11 examples of the 'Spider Mille Miglia' to mark the 11 victories it's had in the famous Italian race, which heralded the rise of the original sports grand tourer.

While there are no performance increases, the Spider Mille Miglia is based on the standard 3.2 V6 model and has a power output of 260 PS (191 kW; 256 hp). Rather than performance upgrades, each special edition features a silver plate that outlines one of Alfa Romeo's victories between 1928 and 1947. The special edition model also gets an exclusive, bright red paint job called 'Rosso 8C' and a 'Quadrifoglio' logo (a four-leaf clover) on its front wings, as well as red stitching for the black leather seats. Additionally, the rear caps on the roll hoops bars are chrome rather than being painted silver, with the body caps behind them - also silver on other versions - in red.

=== Spider Limited Edition ===
The Alfa Romeo Spider Limited Edition features a choice of three color combinations (Carbonio Black, Alfa Red, Ghiaccio White) plus 19-inch alloy wheels, leather upholstery, electrically adjustable and heated memory front seats, and door mirrors. The car is also now available with Fiat Group's Blue&Me hands-free system with voice recognition and media player. Bespoke colors for the Alfa Spider Limited Edition include a Carbonio Black version with a natural leather upholstery while the Alfa Red exterior paintwork is matched to a black leather interior. The Ghiaccio White color scheme comes with a choice of either black or natural leather upholstery.

Under the hood sits the familiar 185 PS 2.2 L JTS petrol engine. The car can accelerate from 0-62 mph in about 8.8 seconds and reach a top speed of more than 139 mph (224 km/h).

== Engines ==
=== Specifications ===
Model	Engine	Displacement	Power	Torque	Comp. ratio	Years
Petrol engines
1.75 TBi	I4	1,742 cc	200 PS (147 kW; 197 hp) at 5,000 rpm	320 N⋅m (236 lb⋅ft) at 1,400 rpm	9.5:1	2009–2010
2.2 JTS	I4	2,198 cc	185 PS (136 kW; 182 hp) at 6,500 rpm	230 N⋅m (170 lb⋅ft) at 4,500 rpm	11.3:1	2005–2010
3.2 V6 JTS	V6	3,195 cc	260 PS (191 kW; 256 hp) at 6,300 rpm	322 N⋅m (237 lb⋅ft) at 4,500 rpm	11.25:1	2005–2010
Diesel engines
2.0 JTDm	I4	1,956 cc	170 PS (125 kW; 168 hp) at 4,000 rpm	360 N⋅m (266 lb⋅ft) at 1,750 rpm	17:1	2009–2010
2.4 JTDm	I5	2,387 cc	200 PS (147 kW; 197 hp) at 4,000 rpm	400 N⋅m (295 lb⋅ft) at 2,000 rpm	17:1	2005–2006
2.4 JTDm	I5	2,387 cc	210 PS (154 kW; 207 hp) at 4,000 rpm	400 N⋅m (295 lb⋅ft) at 1,500 rpm	17:1	2007–2008
2.4 JTDm	I5	2,387 cc	210 PS (154 kW; 207 hp) at 4,000 rpm	440 N⋅m (325 lb⋅ft) at 1,500 rpm	17:1	2009–2010

=== Performance ===
Engine	Top speed km/h (mph)		0–100 km/h,s 0–62 mph,s		Combined consumption		Years
Engine	manual	automatic	manual	automatic	manual	automatic	Years
1.75 TBi	235 (146)		7.7		8.1 L/100 km (34.9 mpg_{‑imp}; 29.0 mpg_{‑US})		2009–
2.2 JTS	222 (138)		8.6		9.4 L/100 km (30.1 mpg_{‑imp}; 25.0 mpg_{‑US})		2005–2007
2.2 JTS	224 (139)		8.6		9.2 L/100 km (30.7 mpg_{‑imp}; 25.6 mpg_{‑US})		2008–
2.2 JTS Selespeed	222 (138)		8.6		9.1 L/100 km (31.0 mpg_{‑imp}; 25.8 mpg_{‑US})		2008–
2.0 JTDM	218 (135)		8.8		5.4 L/100 km (52.3 mpg_{‑imp}; 43.6 mpg_{‑US})		2009–
2.4 JTDM	228 (142)		8.1		6.8 L/100 km (41.5 mpg_{‑imp}; 34.6 mpg_{‑US})		2005–2006
2.4 JTDM (210 PS)	230 (143)		7.9		6.8 L/100 km (41.5 mpg_{‑imp}; 34.6 mpg_{‑US})		2007
2.4 JTDM (210 PS)	250 (155)		7.2		6.8 L/100 km (41.5 mpg_{‑imp}; 34.6 mpg_{‑US})		2009-
2.4 JTDM (200 PS) Q-Tronic		225 (138)		8.3		7.8 L/100 km (36.2 mpg_{‑imp}; 30.2 mpg_{‑US})	2008–
3.2 V6 Q4	240 (149)	240 (149)	6.8	7.0	11.5 L/100 km (24.6 mpg_{‑imp}; 20.5 mpg_{‑US})	12.2 L/100 km (23.2 mpg_{‑imp}; 19.3 mpg_{‑US})	2005–2007
3.2 V6 Q4	244 (151)	244 (151)	6.8	7.0	11.4 L/100 km (24.8 mpg_{‑imp}; 20.6 mpg_{‑US})	12.1 L/100 km (23.3 mpg_{‑imp}; 19.4 mpg_{‑US})	2008–
3.2 V6 FWD	250 (155)		7.0		11.0 L/100 km (25.7 mpg_{‑imp}; 21.4 mpg_{‑US})		2008–
Note: Consumption figures according to European Commission Directive 1999/100/EC.

== Awards ==
- Before it was released, the Brera concept car was voted "Best of Show" by Autoweek magazine at the Geneva Motor Show, "Best of Show" in the prototype category at the Villa d’Este Concorso D’Eleganze, it picked up two prizes at Challenge Bibendum 2002, and "the Most Fascinating Car" award at the Super Car Rally 2002 from Paris to Monte Carlo.
- Most Beautiful Car in the World award at the 21st annual International Automobile Festival 2006
- European Car of the Year 2007 in Japan.
- Best Sports/Coupe - What Diesel Car?
- European Automotive Design Award 2006
- Best Design Award 2006 by Autocar Magazine (UK)
- Best Coupe – Croatian Car of the Year Awards 2006
