= Honda Fit (second generation) =

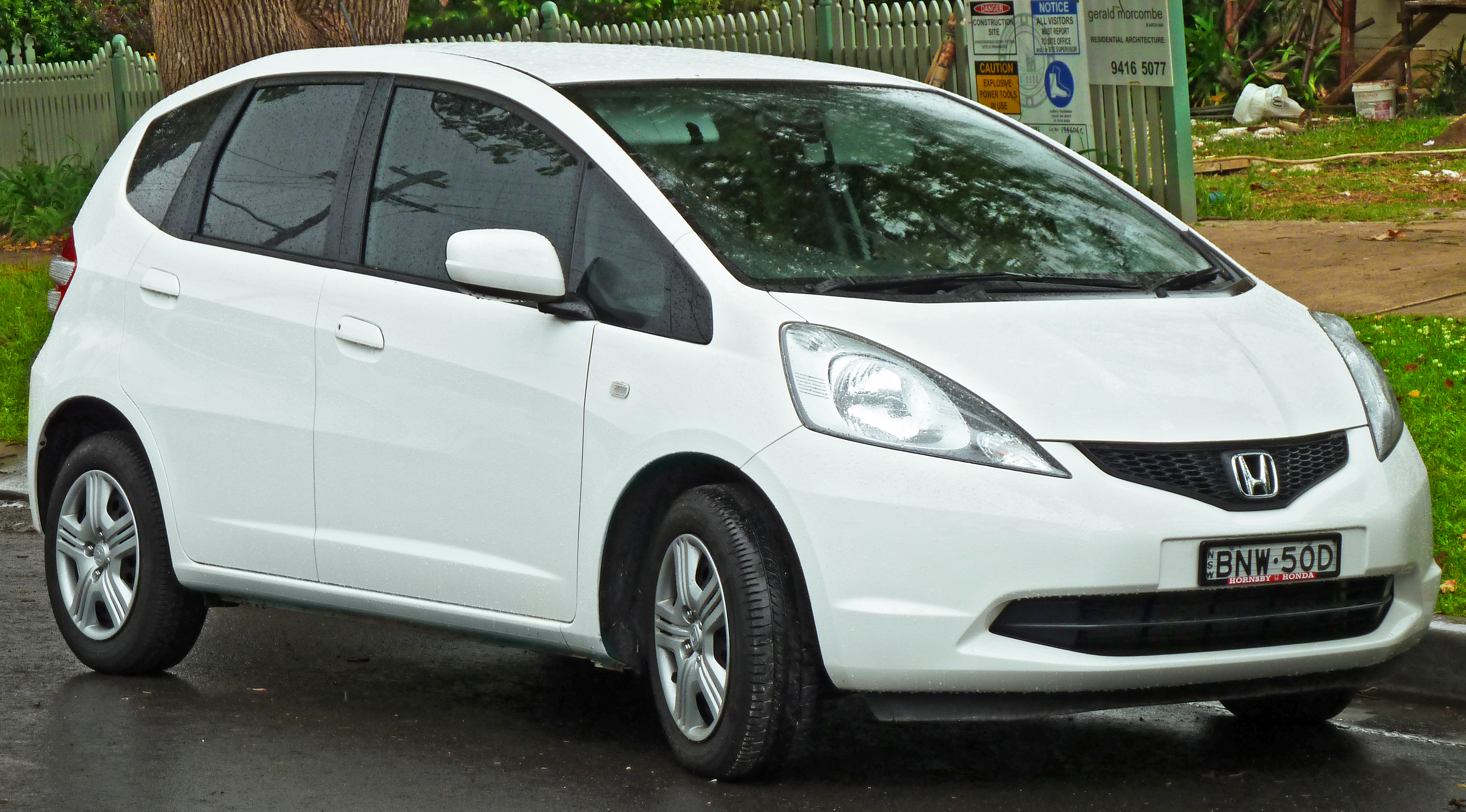
- Pre-facelift Honda Jazz (Australia)

Overview
- Manufacturer: Honda
- Model code: GE6; GE7; GE8; GE9; GG1; GG2; GG3; GG4; GG5; GG6
- Also called: Honda Jazz
- Production: October 2007 – 2014
- Model years: 2009–2013 (US); 2009–2014 (Canada)
- Assembly: Japan: Suzuka, Mie; Sayama, Saitama; United Kingdom: Swindon (HUKM); China: Guangzhou (Guangqi Honda); Guangzhou (CHAC, export); Taiwan: Pingtung; Thailand: Ayutthaya; Indonesia: Karawang (HPM); Malaysia: Alor Gajah, Malacca (2012–2014); India: Greater Noida (HCIL); Brazil: Sumaré, São Paulo
- Designer: Daisuke Sawai

Body and chassis
- Class: Subcompact car (B)
- Body style: 5-door hatchback
- Layout: Front-engine, front-wheel-drive; Front-engine, all-wheel-drive (Japan)
- Platform: Honda Global Small Car
- Related: Honda Fit Shuttle (first generation); Honda City/Ballade (fifth generation); Honda Freed (first generation); Honda Insight (second generation)

Powertrain
- Engine: Petrol: 1.2 L L12B1 SOHC i-VTEC I4 (Europe); 1.3 L L13Z1 SOHC i-VTEC I4; 1.5 L L15A SOHC i-VTEC I4; Petrol hybrid: 1.3 L LDA-MF6 I4; 1.5 L LEA I4
- Transmission: 5-speed manual; 6-speed manual; 5-speed automatic; 6-speed I-SHIFT automated manual; CVT (Japan)
- Hybrid drivetrain: Integrated Motor Assist (IMA)

Dimensions
- Wheelbase: 2,500 mm (98.4 in)
- Length: 3,900–3,920 mm (153.5–154.3 in); 4,105 mm (161.6 in) (North America)
- Width: 1,695 mm (66.7 in)
- Height: 1,525–1,550 mm (60.0–61.0 in)
- Curb weight: 990–1,170 kg (2,183–2,579 lb)

Chronology
- Predecessor: Honda Fit (first generation)
- Successor: Honda Fit (third generation)

The second generation Honda Fit is a subcompact car or supermini manufactured by Honda from 2007 until 2014. It debuted on 17 October 2007 at the 40th Tokyo Motor Show.

== Overview ==
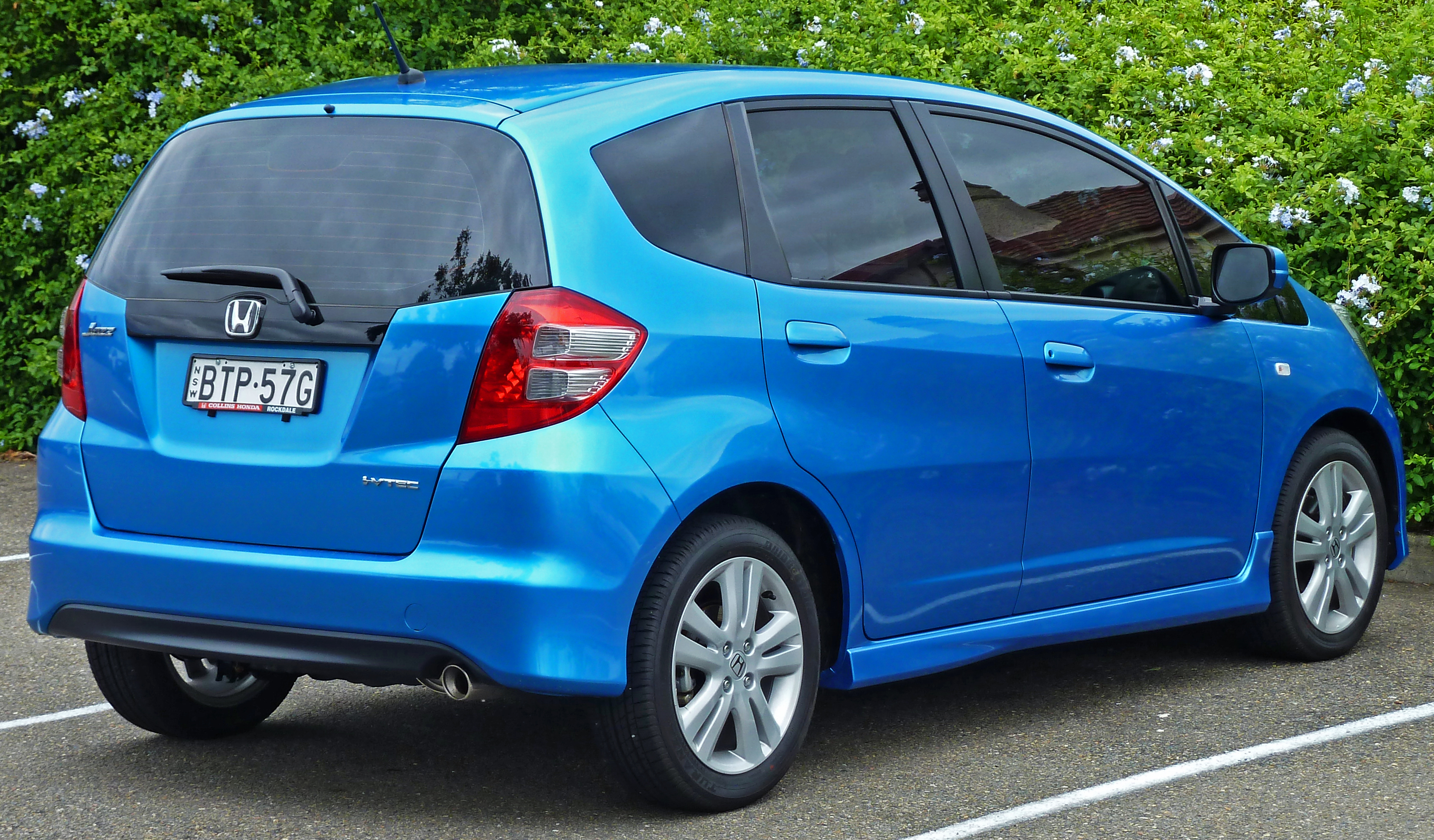
Pre-facelift Honda Jazz VTi-S (Australia)

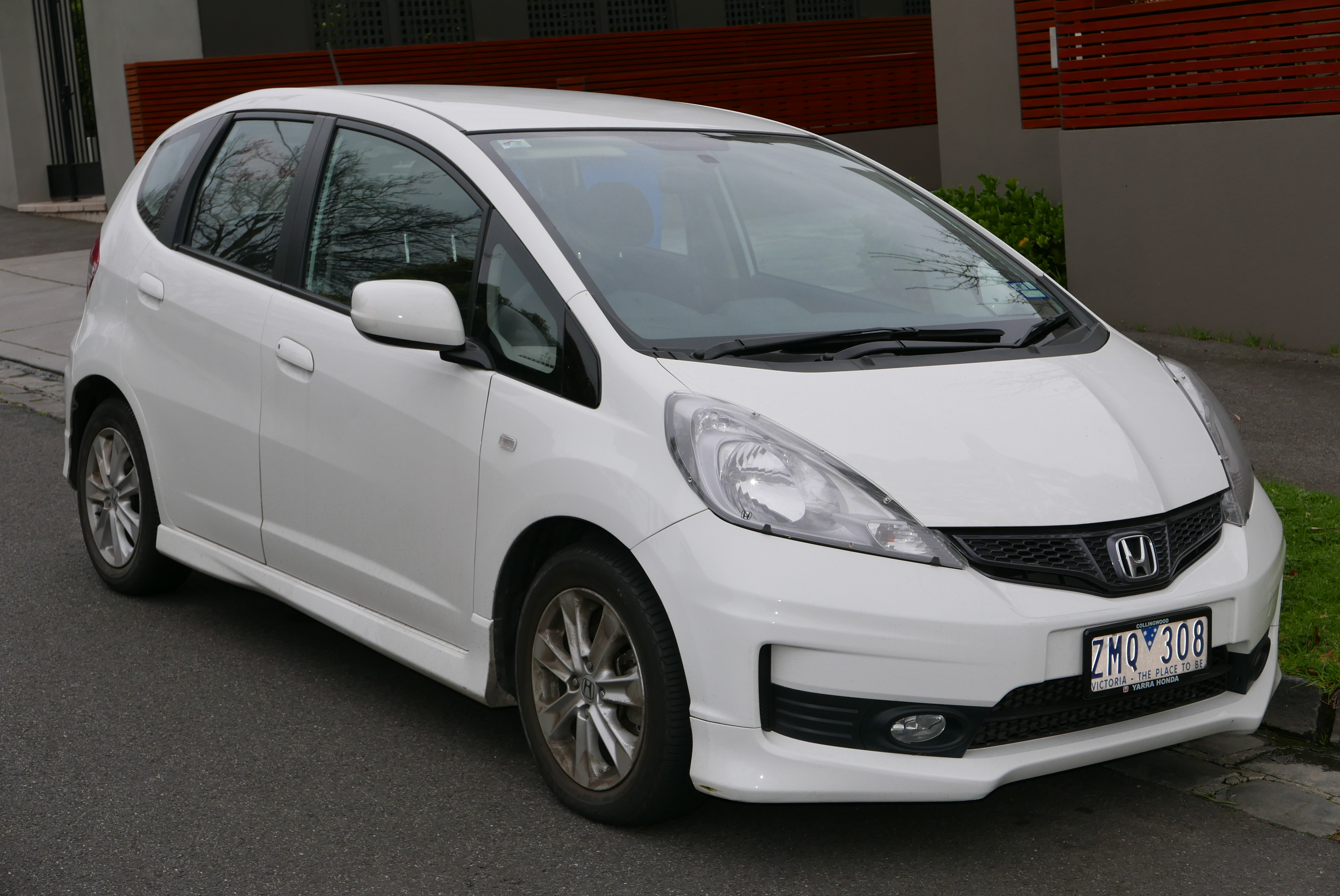

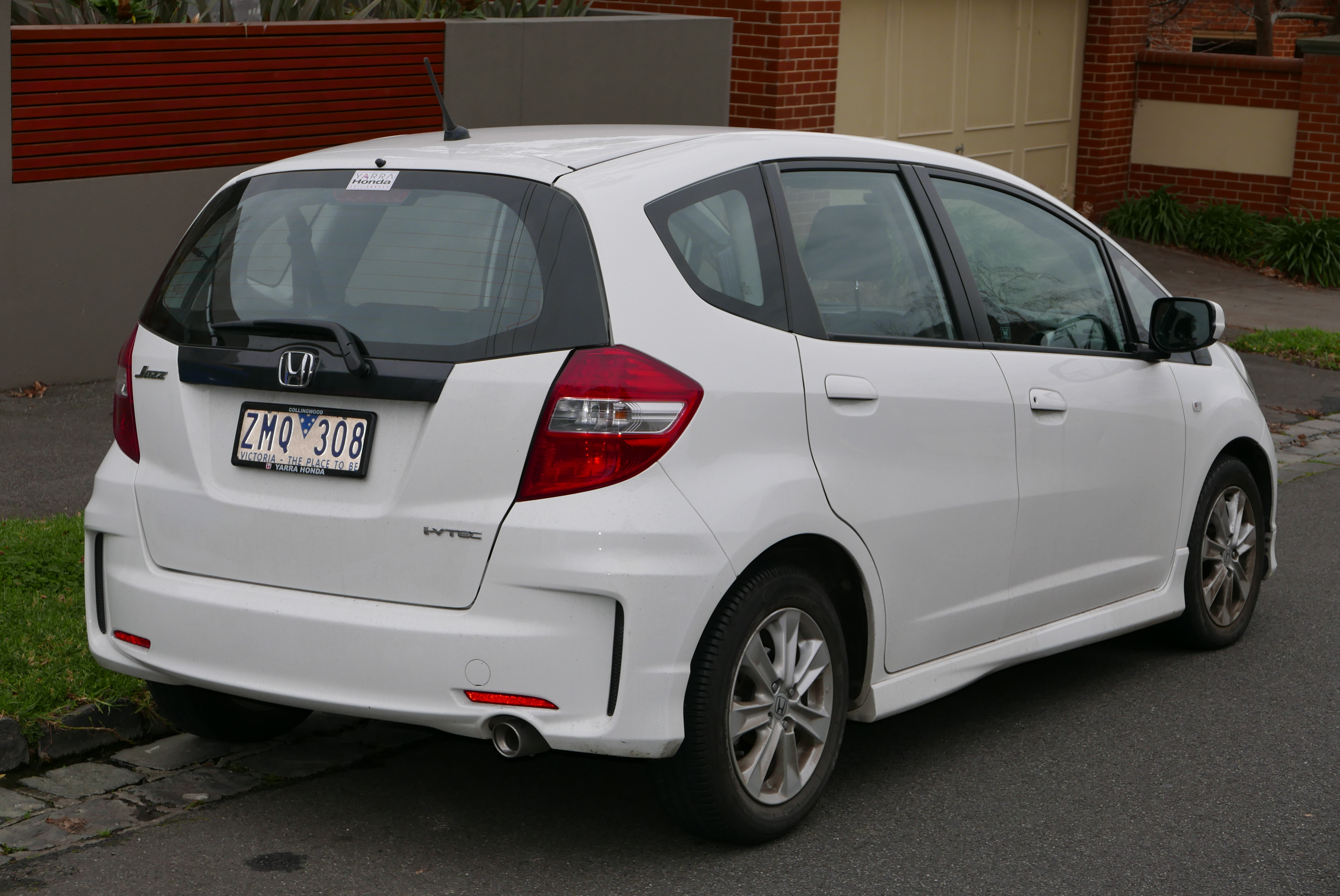
Facelifted Honda Jazz VTi (Australia)

The vehicle offered a longer wheelbase than its predecessor and is wider and longer overall. Overall height is unchanged, while interior height increased by 7.6 mm (0.3 in). Multi-mode seating and cargo configurations were retained (US models were no longer capable of Refresh/Relax Mode until the following gen), with redesigned headrests enabling more convenient folding of the rear seats. The cabin featured greater interior volume, and boot capacity decreased from 21.3 to 20.6 cubic feet (0.58 m^{3}). At its introduction in 2007, it won the Car of the Year Japan Award for the second time.

Two engines were offered in the second-generation Fit. A 1.3-litre i-VTEC produces 100 PS (99 hp; 74 kW) at 6,000 rpm and 127 N⋅m (13.0 kg⋅m; 93.7 lb⋅ft) at 4,800 rpm. This engine was offered in both European and Asian markets. A 1.5-litre i-VTEC engine was also offered and produces a maximum output of 120 PS (118 hp; 88 kW) at 6,600 rpm and 145 N⋅m (14.8 kg⋅m; 107 lb⋅ft) at 4,800 rpm. This was the only engine available in the American market, in addition to being available in several Asian markets including Japan and Malaysia. A five-speed manual, five-speed automatic (4WD only) and CVT transmission were available.

The chassis was re-engineered, with structural rigidity increased by 164 percent over the first-generation Fit.

"We are very aware that the predecessor was a little firm, so we spent a lot of time fixing that. But we believe we've got it just right now."

— Kohei Hitomi, chief engineer

The second-generation Fit was claimed to feature improved ride and handling.

== Markets ==
=== Japan ===
Japanese sales began in October 2007. Facelifted models, and the hybrid version, arrived in October 2010. Models available in Japan are the 1.3-litre and 1.5-litre variants consisting of the 13G, 15XH and the top-of-the-line RS.

In 2007, aftermarket tuner Mugen, introduced a new line of accessories for the Japanese-market 2008 Honda Fit. On 17 January 2008, they introduced the Mugen Fit F154SC at the 2008 Tokyo Auto Salon. The F154SC has a supercharger installed onto the stock L15A engine that raises base horsepower of the 1.5 L (92 cu in) I4 to 150 hp (152 PS; 112 kW) and 184 N⋅m (18.8 kg⋅m; 136 lb⋅ft). Other upgrades include full coilover suspension, exhaust, intake, and brakes. Body modifications include a widened track to feed more air into the engine bay.

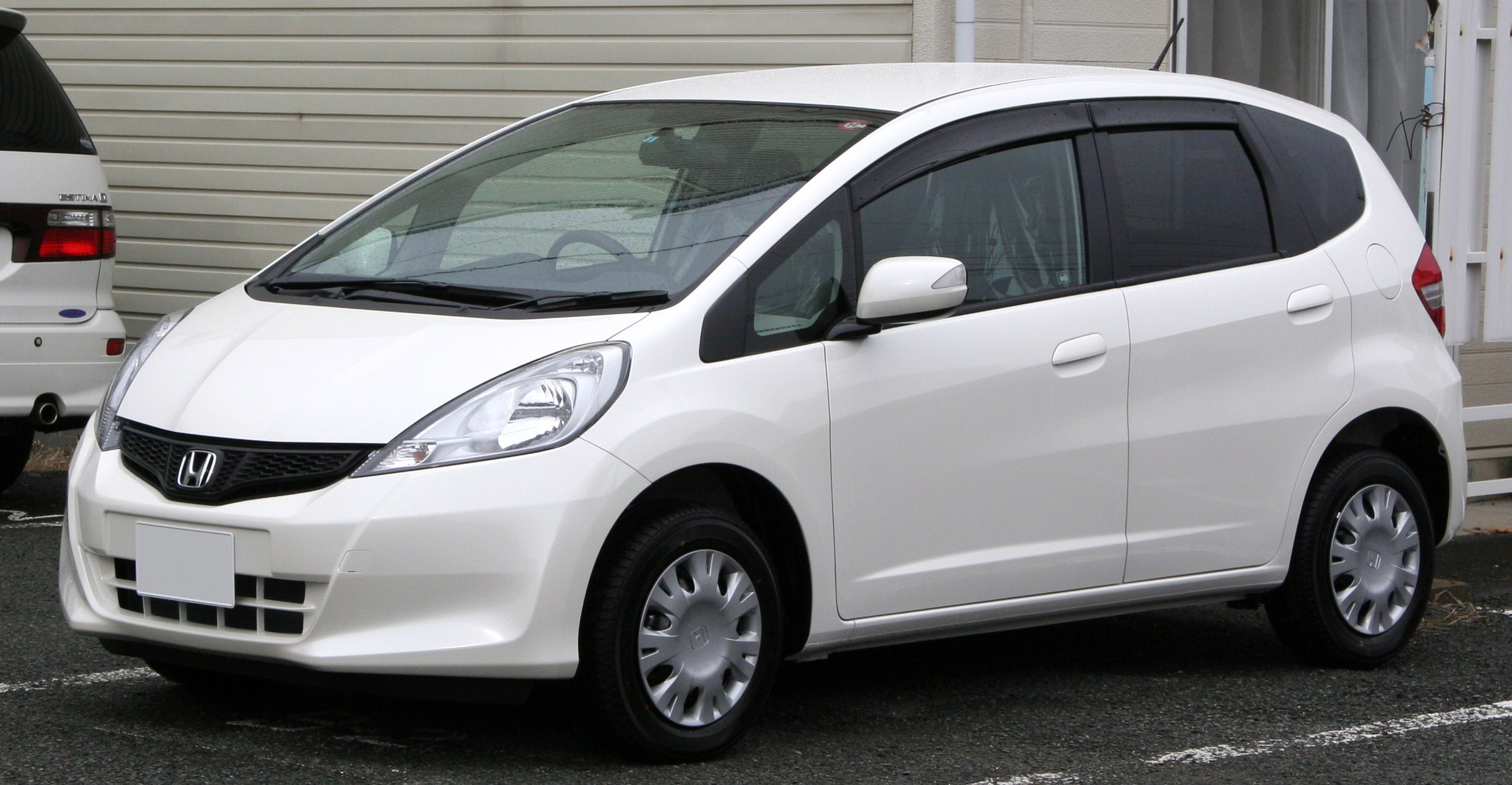
First facelift Honda Fit (Japan)

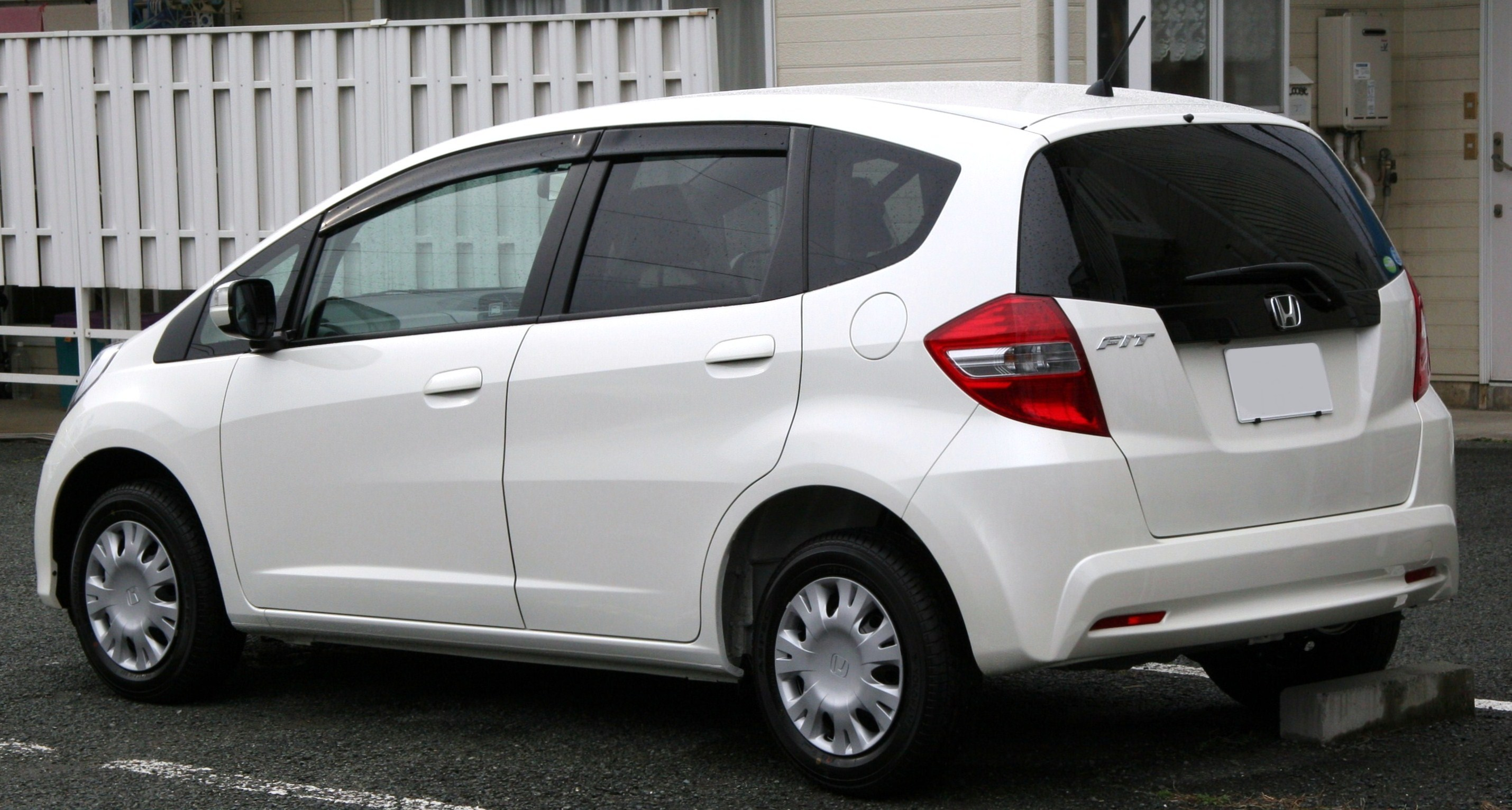
First facelift Honda Fit (Japan)

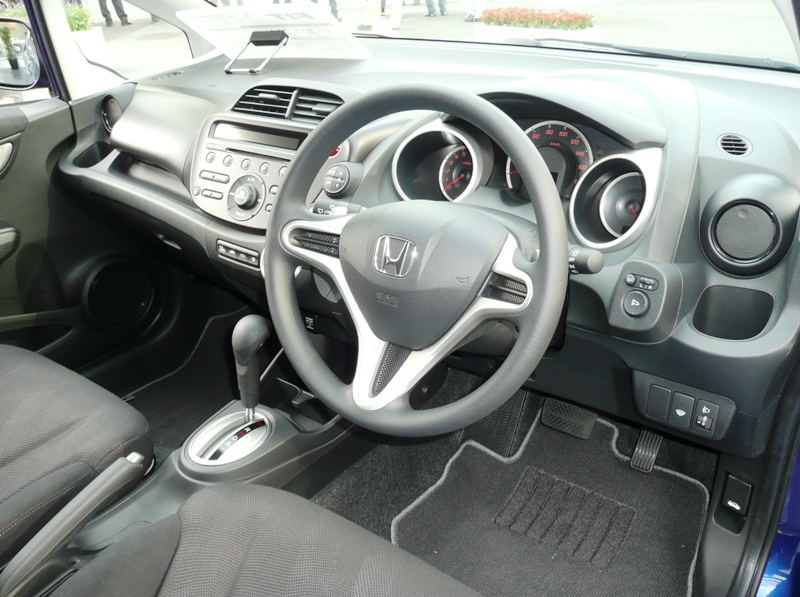
JDM-spec interior

=== North America ===
Although the second-generation Honda Fit was introduced in the Japanese market in 2007, the first-generation Fit was still sold in the North American market for the 2008 model year. The second-generation Fit for the North American market was unveiled on March 19, 2008, at the New York International Auto Show for the 2009 model year. To comply with Canada Motor Vehicle Safety Standards (CMVSS) and improve crash test ratings, the North American Fit's front overhang is several inches longer; the rear bumper is longer too. The engine is a 1.5 L (92 cu in) i-VTEC 4-cylinder with 117 hp (119 PS; 87 kW) at 6,600 rpm mated to a five-speed manual transmission or a five-speed automatic transmission.

The second-generation Honda Fit went on sale in North America on August 26, 2008, for the 2009 model year. It was considered the most expensive within the subcompact class when equipped as such, but was also described as modestly priced. It was reported in September 2009 that Honda was considering producing the Fit in North America in response to the increasing strength of the Japanese yen against the U.S. dollar.

The base Fit comes with 15-inch wheels with covers, power windows, a tilt and telescoping steering wheel, a 160-watt AM/FM/CD audio system with four speakers, a 12-volt power outlet, and other features. The Fit Sport adds a ground appearance package, 16-inch (410 mm) alloy wheels, paddle shifters, a security system, fog lights, chrome exhaust finisher, a leather-wrapped steering wheel, steering wheel-mounted audio controls, floor mats, a 6-speaker AM/FM/CD audio system, and other features. For the first time, a navigation system is introduced to the Fit as an option on the Fit Sport trim.

For the 2011 models, Vehicle Stability Assist, cruise control, remote entry and USB audio interface became standard across all trim levels. In addition, the Fit Sport now comes with carpeted floor mats.

For the 2012 facelift, the Fit Sport features a new front bumper cover and grille, black headlight bezels, dark "machined surface" finish alloy wheels, a black monochrome theme interior with chrome accents. The base model receives body-color exterior mirrors (previously black), standard security system, and new wheel covers.

Canadian trims include the DX (two speakers, black door handles and side mirrors), DX-A (adds factory-installed air conditioning), LX (adds among other things, body-colored door handles and side mirrors, 15-inch lightweight alloy wheels from the Civic Hybrid and DX-G, rear spoiler, power locks and remote entry, rear speakers for a total of four, cruise control) and Fit Sport (adds USB jack and Vehicle Stability Assist). The Fit Sport is similar to its American counterpart, however a navigation system is not offered as an option.

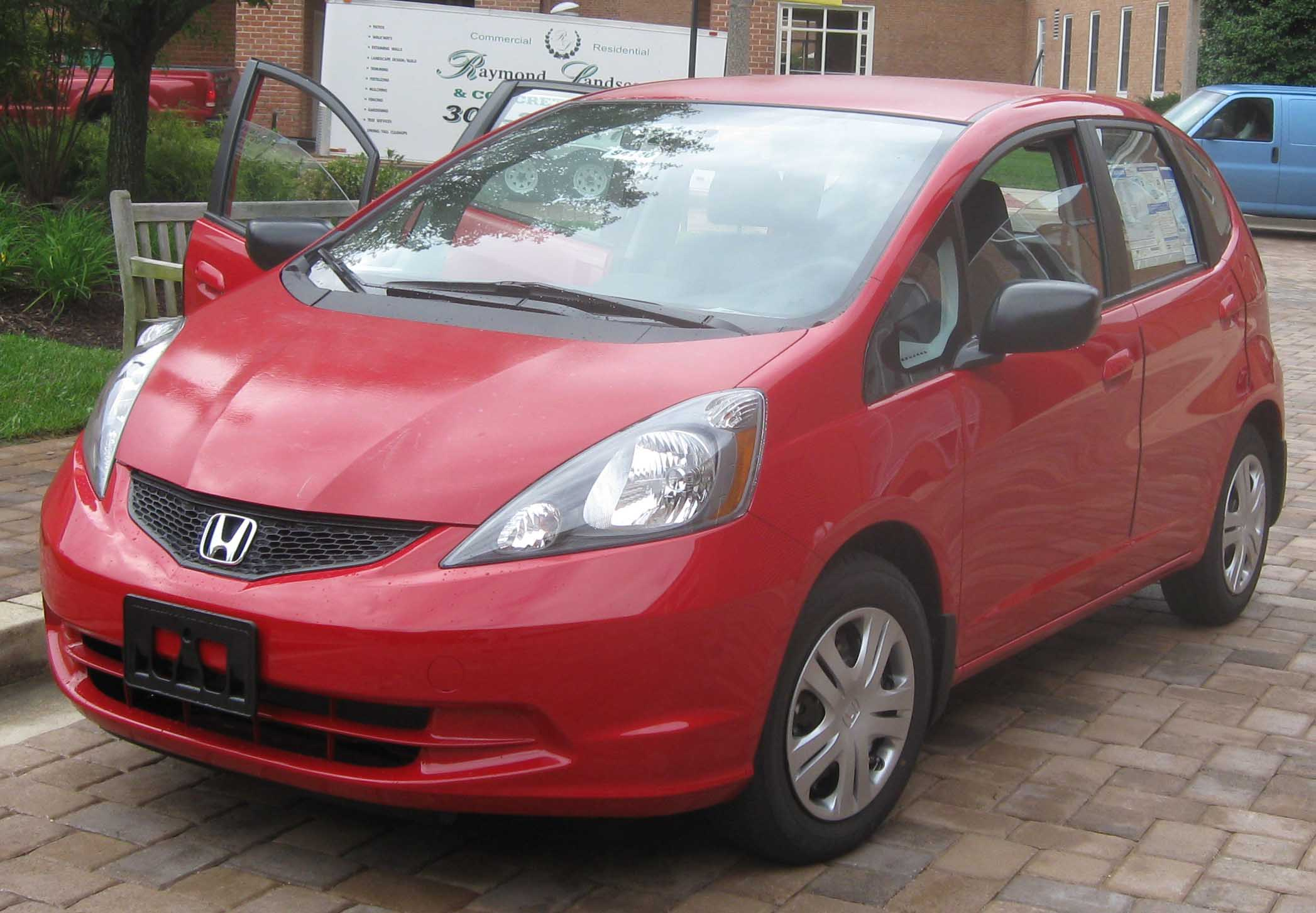
2010 Honda Fit base (US)

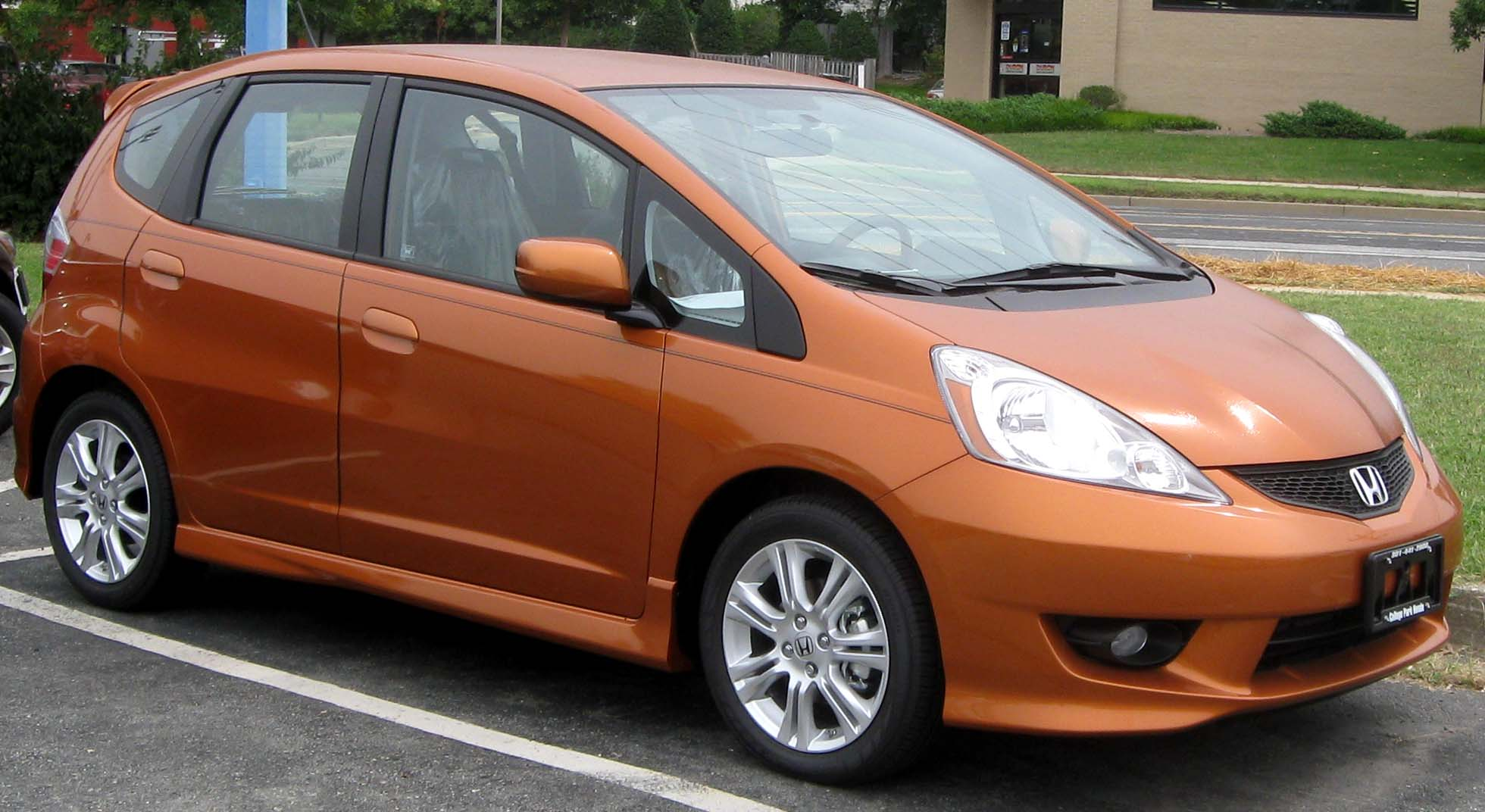
2010 Honda Fit Sport (US)

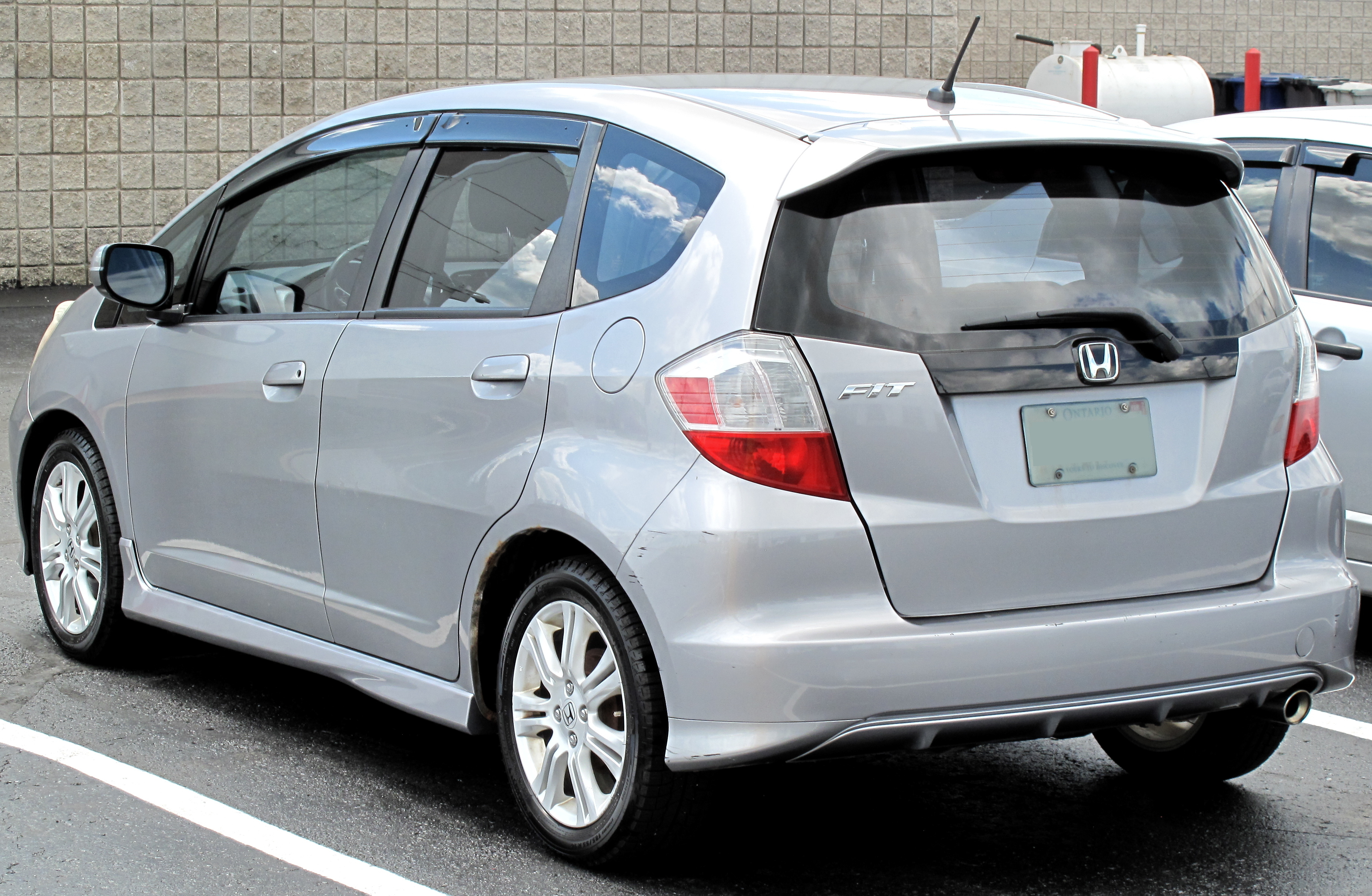
2009 Honda Fit Sport (Canada)

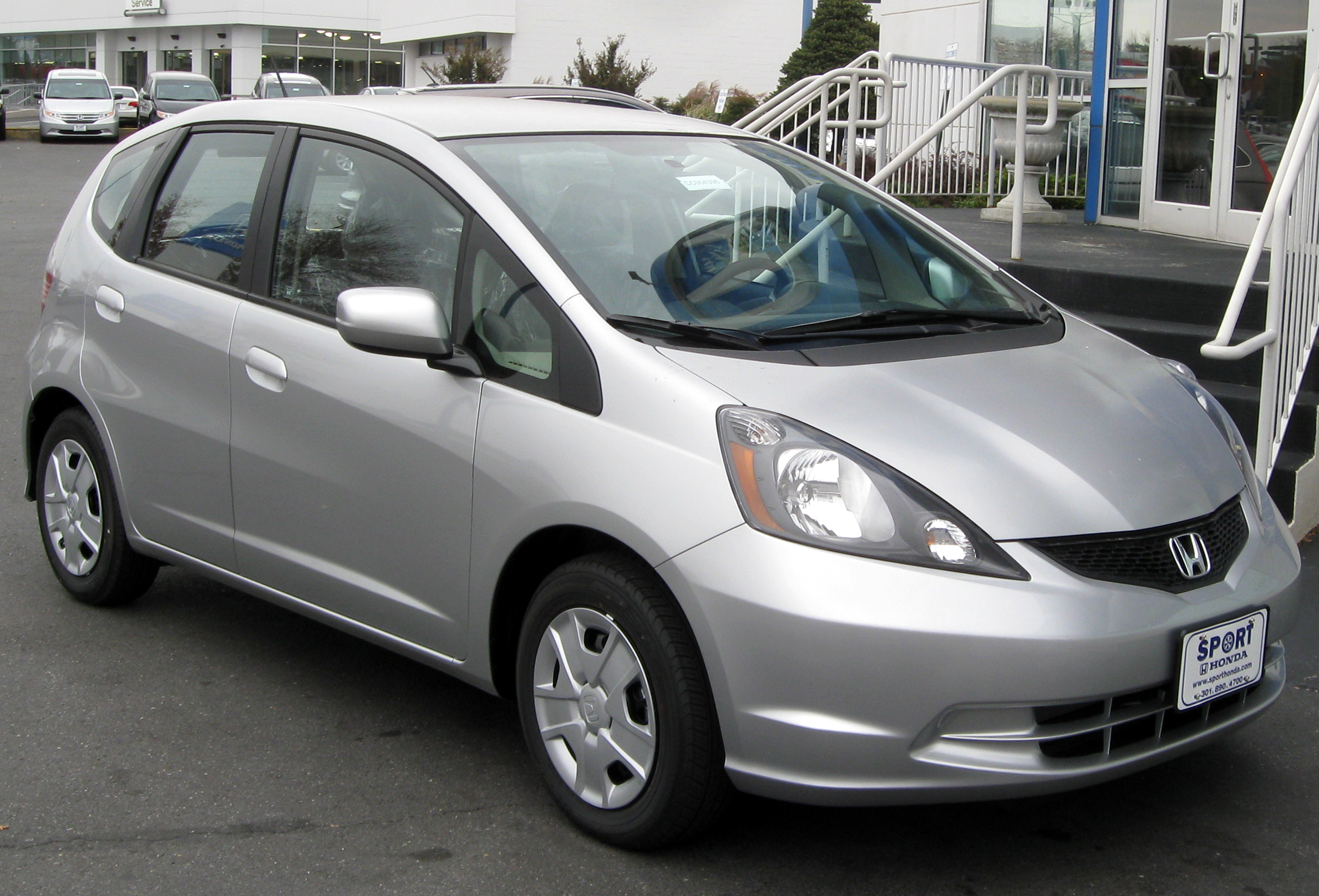
2012 Honda Fit base (US)

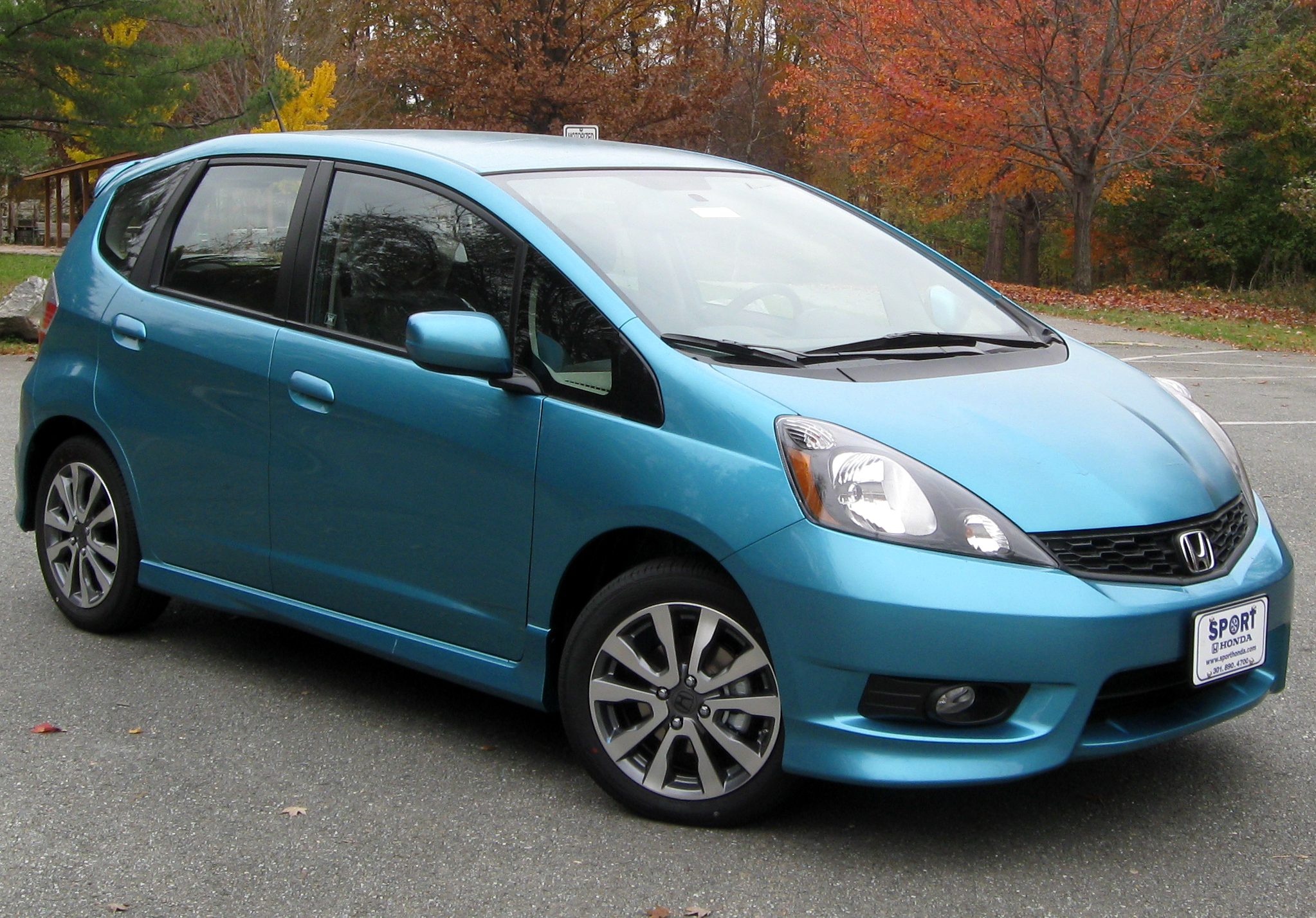
2012 Honda Fit Sport (US)

=== Brazil ===
The Sumaré-built new Fit was introduced in October 2008 in Brazil at the São Paulo Auto Show. There are four versions: LX and LXL, with the 1.35-litre (marketed as 1.4) 16V engine, and EX and EXL, with the 1.5-litre 16V engine. Both engines have VTEC and flex fuel capabilities as standard. Manual and automatic – both five-speed – gearboxes are offered; CVT was no longer available.

=== Malaysia ===
The second-generation Fit was launched as the Jazz in Malaysia in August 2008. Two models were available: Grade S and Grade V. In June 2009, a limited edition Grade S Modulo variant was launched limited to 100 units. In April 2011, the facelift model was officially launched with a sole Grade V variant being available. In August 2012, the sole Grade V variant was replaced with a Grade S variant that saw a reduction in price and a reduction in equipment. Lastly, in July 2013, the Jazz was sold in Malaysia as a locally assembled model. Thus far, the second-generation Jazz had been fully imported from Thailand. Only one variant was available though dubbed Grade S. It comes in a blue-black fabric upholstery for the interior, 4-speakers, a CD/MP3/WMA player with USB and AUX jack, immobiliser and 4 corner reverse sensors.

All second generation Jazz sold in Malaysia came with a 1.5-litre i-VTEC engine with an automatic gearbox.

=== Singapore ===
The second-generation Fit/Jazz was available from parallel importers and the authorized dealer in Singapore. The authorized dealer sells the Jazz in two variants, the 1.3-litre and the 1.5-litre having similar specifications as the parallel imported Fit but does not adopt the RS grade for the 1.5 model. The Jazz was launched later from the authorized dealer in 2009.

=== Thailand ===
The second-generation Fit was marketed in Thailand as the Jazz. The second generation model has been unveiled on 23 March 2008. 3 trim levels were offered, which were S, V and SV. Cars with the S trim level would have 5-speed manual and 5-speed automatic transmission while the V and SV trims with only automatic transmission. All trim levels have the 1.5-litre 16V engine with i-VTEC, ABS and CD/MP3 radio. The Jazz in Thailand got a facelift in January 2011 with new front grille and rear bumper, sees an addition of front dual airbags across the range and front fog lights in SV models.

In early 2012, the Thai government allowed Honda Thailand to import the Jazz and Accord models from Japan to serve buyers in Thailand without any additional excise and import tax, due to a flood in the Honda plant in Ayutthaya province. The Japan-imported Jazz came with HID headlights and six airbags.

The Jazz hybrid was launched in Thailand in July 2012, the first hybrid in the country's sub-compact market. First time buyers of the car are eligible for Thai government's first car tax rebate. The Jazz that is built in Thailand were exported to the Philippines and Australia.

=== Philippines ===
The second-generation Honda Jazz was introduced to the Philippine market in October 2008, making its debut at the 2nd Philippine International Motor Show. Honda promoted the Jazz as a versatile subcompact hatchback with a competitive introductory price aimed at both young professionals and small families.

The model was offered in two trim levels:

- 1.3 S – available with either a 5-speed manual or 5-speed automatic transmission.
- 1.5 V – offered exclusively with a 5-speed automatic transmission featuring paddle shifters and distinctive alloy wheels.

Both variants featured Honda’s ULTRA seat system (Utility, Long, Tall, Refresh modes), which allowed for exceptional interior flexibility. The engines were Honda’s i-VTEC units:

- 1.3-liter i-VTEC (L13A) – producing around 100 hp.
- 1.5-liter i-VTEC (L15A) – producing around 120 hp.

A factory RS-style body kit (but not the actual RS variant) was made available for the 1.5 V trim. This included sportier bumpers, side skirts, a rear spoiler, and unique alloy wheels.

Upon its launch, three variants of the all-new Jazz were made available in the Philippine market, with introductory pricing set at ₱707,000 for the 1.3-liter S M/T, ₱747,000 for the 1.3-liter S A/T, and ₱797,000 for the 1.5-liter V A/T.

All Philippine-market units were initially sourced from Honda's Ayutthaya plant in Thailand. However, in late 2011, severe flooding in Thailand halted production, and Honda scrapped over 1,000 flood-damaged vehicles.

To maintain supply, Honda Cars Philippines imported Completely Built-Up (CBU) units from Japan for a brief period.

==== Facelift and Return to Thai Production ====
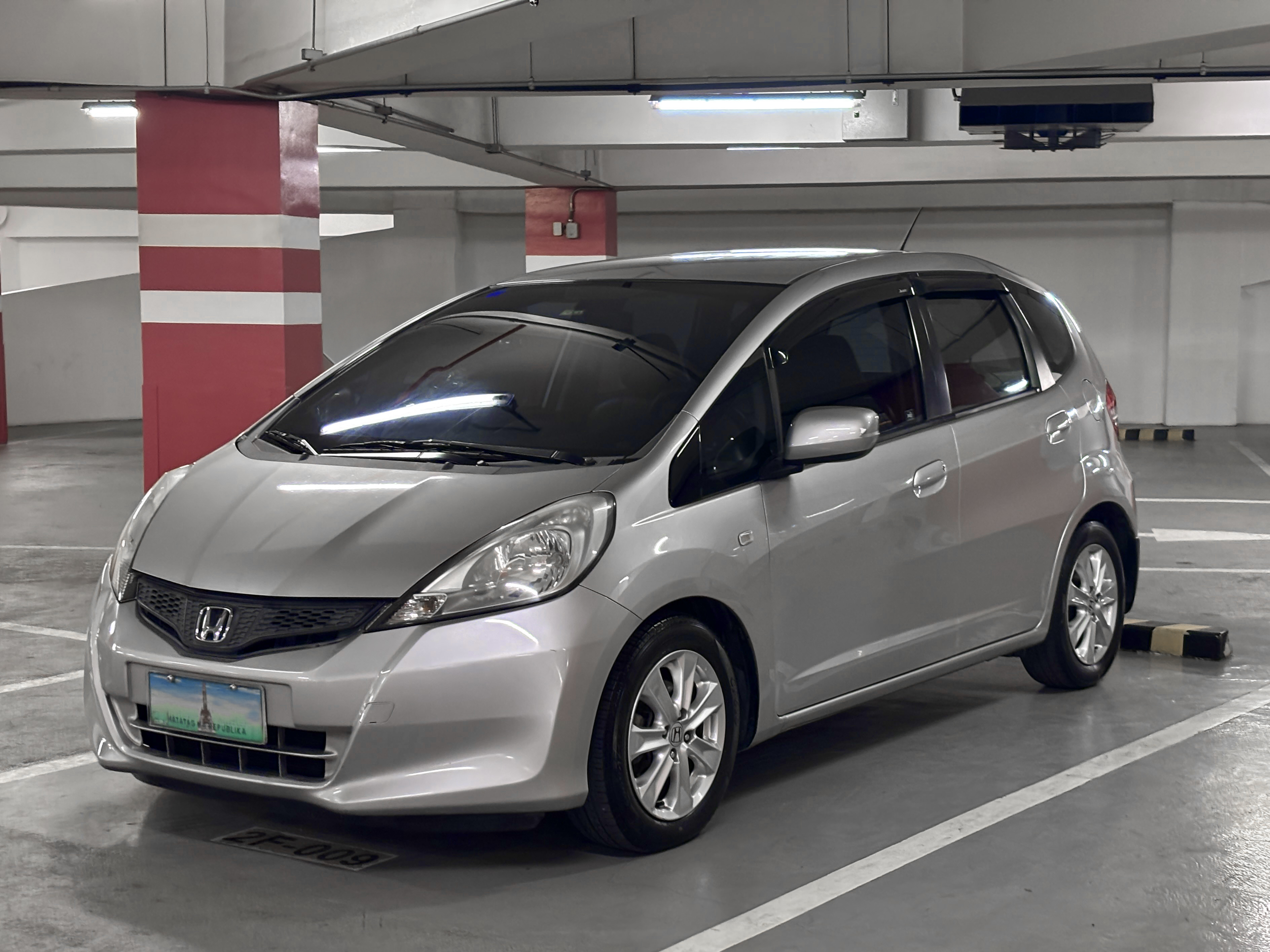
2011-manufactured Honda Jazz 1.3S facelift for the 2012 model year. (Philippines)

In late 2011, Honda introduced a facelift for the Jazz that included:

- Redesigned front bumper and grille
- Updated alloy wheel designs
- Fog lights for the 1.5 V variant

When Thai production resumed in early 2012, the Jazz 1.3 S model was officially relaunched on May 18, 2012. The prices at the time were:

- Jazz 1.3 S M/T: ₱742,000
- Jazz 1.3 S A/T: ₱782,000

A review later that year praised the 1.5 V variant's blend of performance and features, noting its price was justified by its overall refinement. The 1.5 V was priced at ₱857,000.

The second-generation Jazz remained on sale in the Philippines until its successor was introduced in July 2014.

=== Indonesia ===
The second-generation Jazz was launched on 27 June 2008, sold in S and RS variants. In 2008, the total sales of Honda Jazz in Indonesia was 24,969 units, ranked 5th in total for the best-selling passenger car in Indonesia. In 2009, sales fell to 15,713 as economic activities slowed down but sales ranking improved to the fourth best-selling passenger car of the country. As of the end of November 2010, sales of Jazz totaled 20,581 unit for the year. As of June 2014, totaled 228,500 units Honda Jazz were sold since early 2004, making it the segment leader. On 19 May 2011, the Jazz underwent a facelift including the redesigned front grille, the new front/rear bumper, and LED tail lights. On 22 January 2013, the Jazz went through minor changes, including a new headlight and tail light accents, added an upper spoiler as standard, new wheels, a new audio system, and the 'RS' badge on the grille. The S trim received the chrome grille.

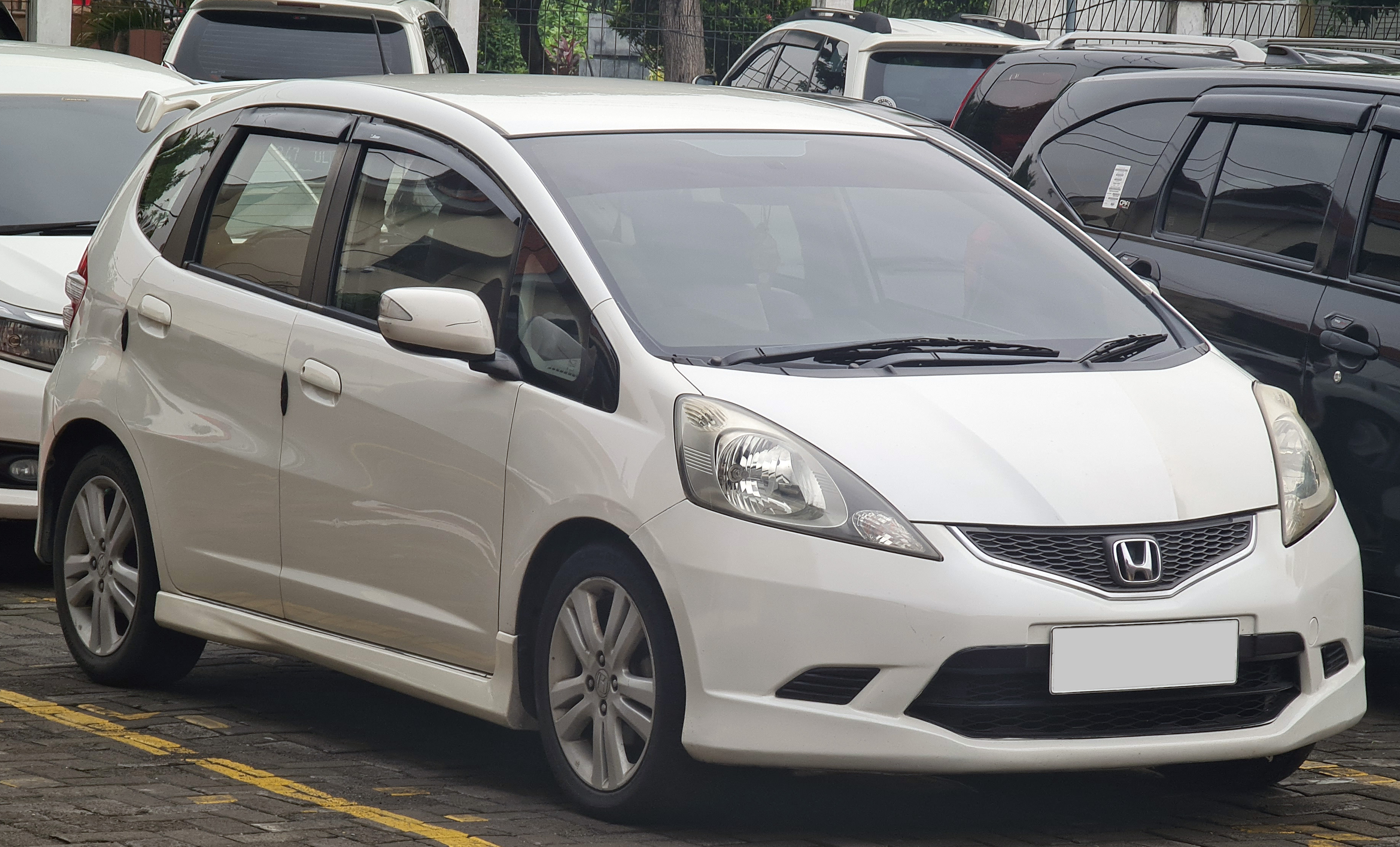
Pre-facelift Honda Jazz RS (Indonesia)

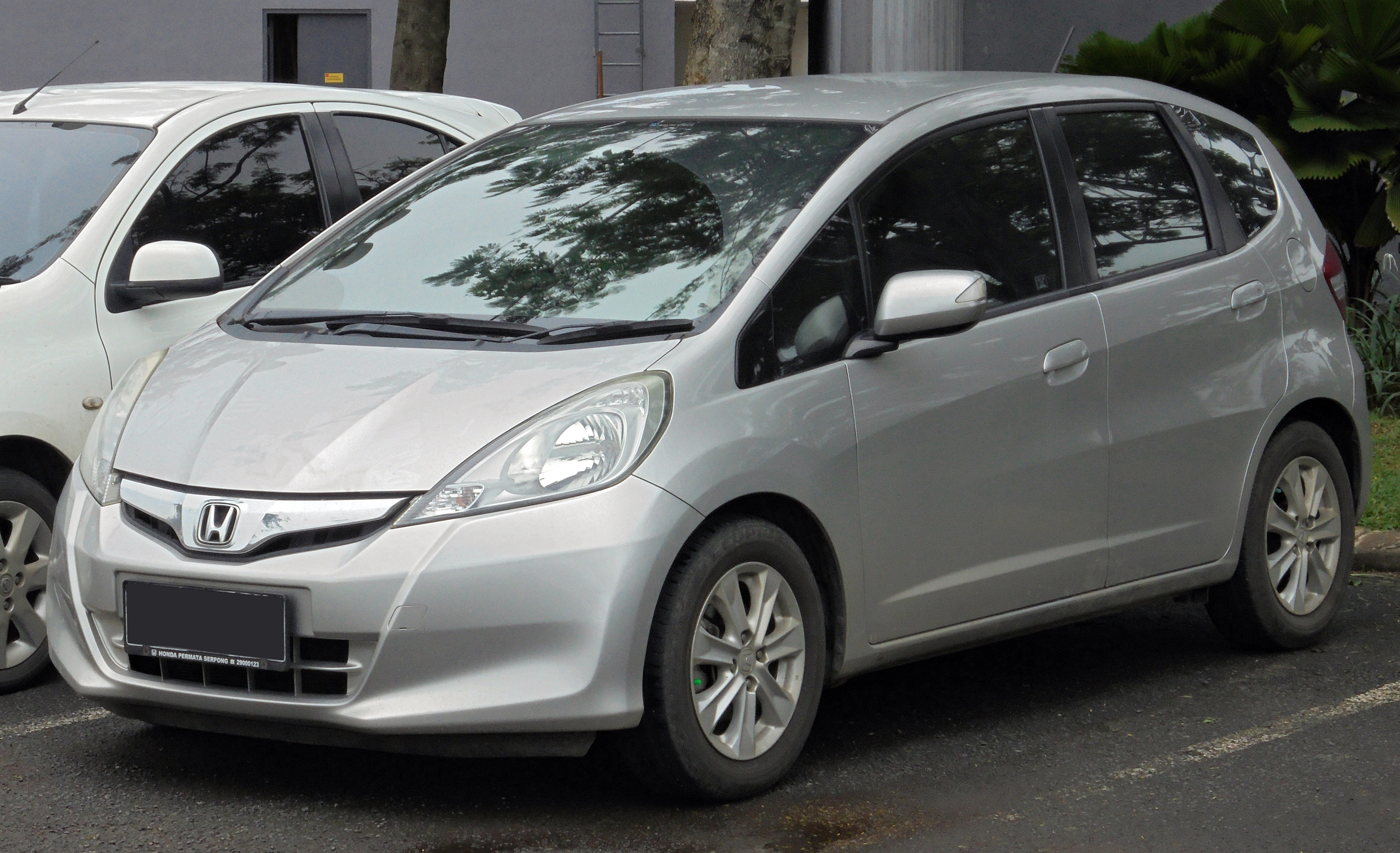
Second facelift Honda Jazz S (Indonesia)

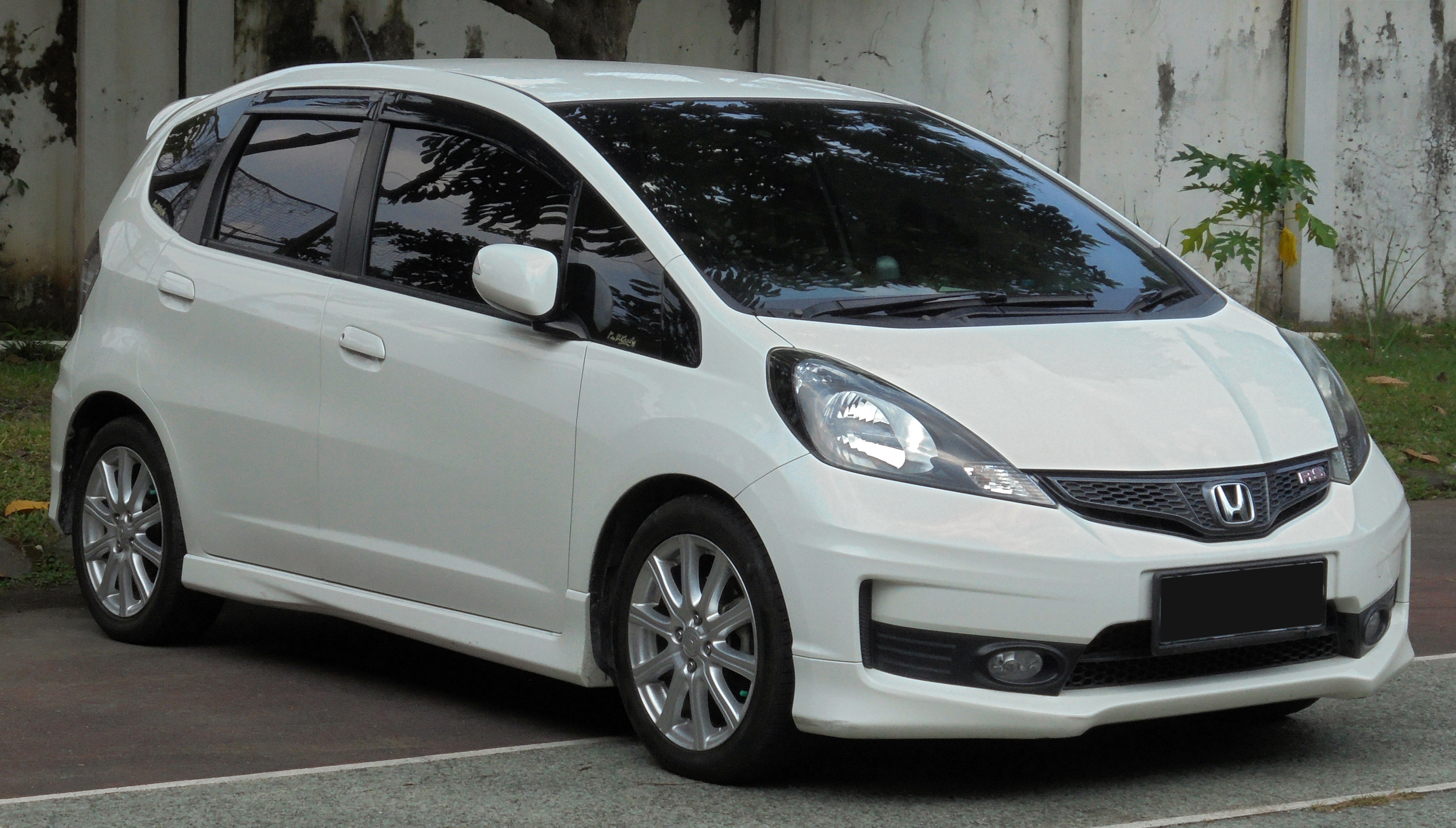
Second facelift Honda Jazz RS (Indonesia)

=== India ===
The Fit was launched as the Jazz in India in June 2009 with 26 percent import content. It was manufactured by Honda Cars India Limited at its factory in Greater Noida. In India, the car is powered by 1.2-litre i-VTEC engine, as the government imposes higher tax for vehicles with petrol engines larger than 1,200 cc. Honda Cars India postponed the introduction of the third generation Jazz up to 2015, citing production limitations.

=== Australia ===
The second-generation Jazz was available in Australia, albeit initially without electronic stability control (known as Vehicle Stability Control in Honda nomenclature). Honda introduced the feature at the end of 2010. Stability Control has since become standard on all Jazzes sold. Until the end of 2011 the Australian Jazz was sourced from Thailand. However, due to the 2011 flooding in Thailand, Honda Australia sourced two special editions of Jazz from Japan from early 2012 until Honda's plant in Thailand resumed production. The Japan-produced Vibe and Vibe S replaced the existing GLi and VTi prefixed models.

=== Europe ===
On 28 July 2008, Honda UK announced that the second-generation Jazz would be on sale from 17 October 2008. The new model will be sold with two new engine variants; a 90 PS 1.2-liter i-VTEC petrol capable of 55.4 miles per imperial gallon (5.10 L/100 km; 46.1 mpg_{‑US}) (combined) and with low CO_{2} emissions of 120 g/km; and a 100 PS 1.4-litre i-VTEC petrol engine capable of 53.3 miles per imperial gallon (5.30 L/100 km; 44.4 mpg_{‑US}) (combined) and with similarly low CO_{2} emissions of 123 g/km. Honda also announced the introduction of an optional new "I-SHIFT" automated manual gearbox replacing the traditional automatic CVT gearbox that had been available on the previous model.

Production of the Jazz for European markets moved from Japan to Honda's UK plant in Swindon on 7 October 2009.

Facelifted models and the new hybrid model went on sale on 1 February 2011. Aerodynamics improvement help the Cd drop from 0.336 to 0.330. Engine modifications result in a drop of carbon emission of two grams to 123 g/km for 1.2-litre engine and 126 g/km for 1.4-litre engine respectively. CVT transmission was available on cars with the larger engine.

== Fit Hybrid (2010) ==
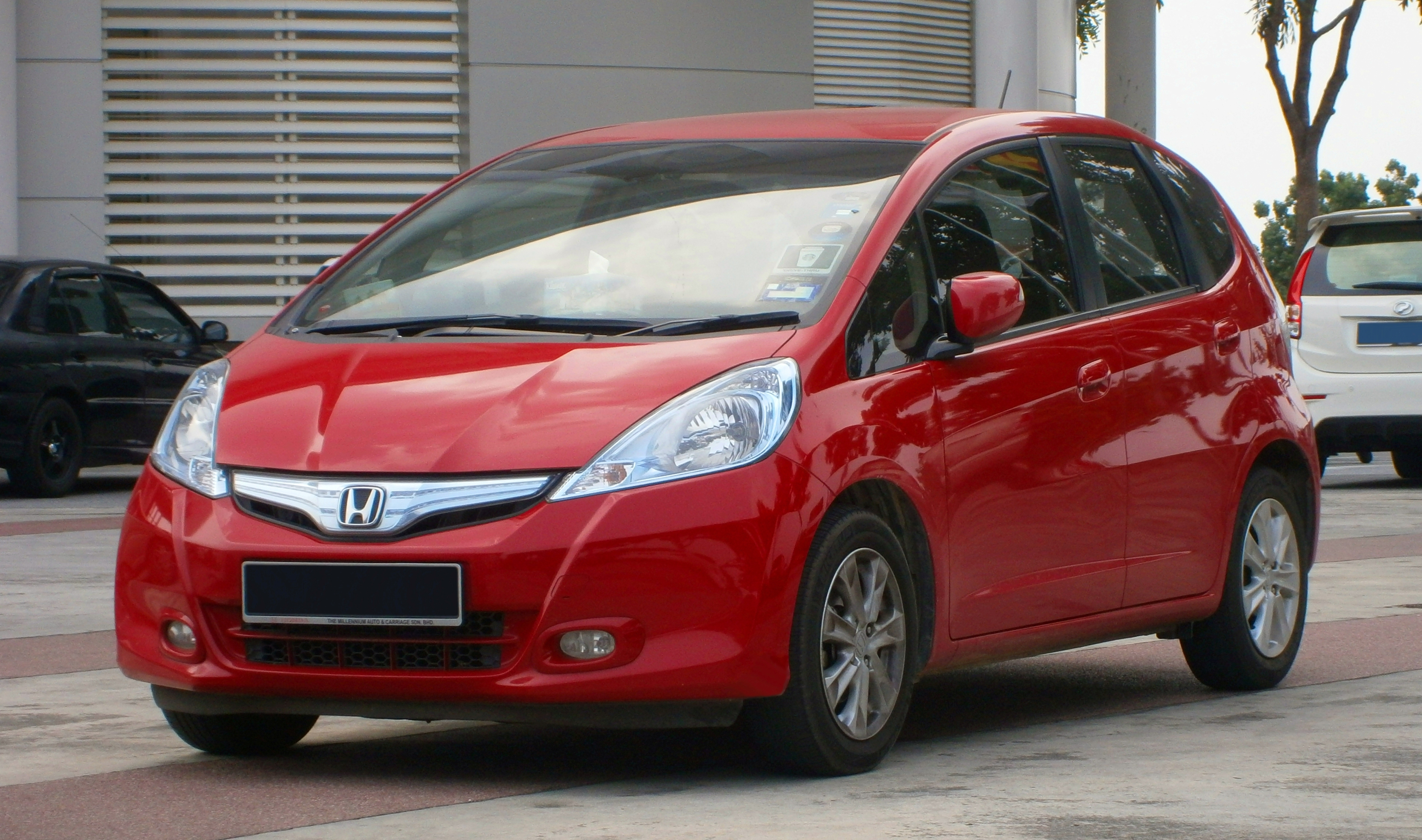

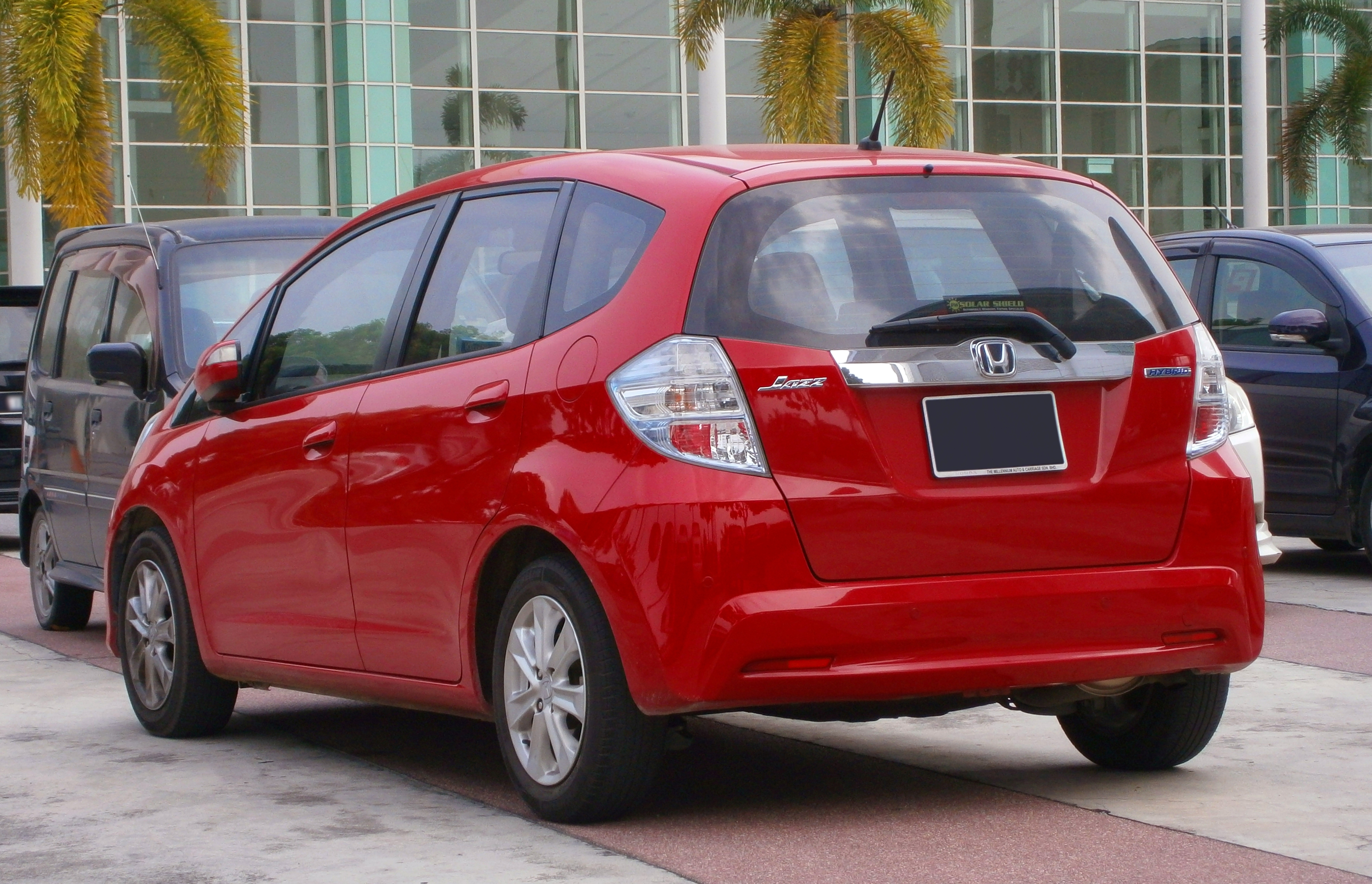
Honda Jazz Hybrid (Malaysia)

Sales of the Fit Hybrid began in Japan in October 2010. At its introduction, the hybrid version was the cheapest petrol-hybrid electric vehicle sold in Japan. The Fit Hybrid featured a 1.3-litre engine and electric motor, with an estimated fuel economy of 3.3 litres per 100 kilometres (86 mpg_{‑imp}; 71 mpg_{‑US}) measured in accordance with Japanese 10–15 cycle. The car used a parallel hybrid system that works in tandem with the petrol engine. The parallel hybrid system is simple and lightweight while enhancing driving performance and fuel economy.

The European version, called Jazz Hybrid, was unveiled at the 2010 Paris Motor Show and became available in early 2011. Honda Fit/Jazz for the European and Japanese markets featured revised headlights, new front grille, a leather seating option and a new Lime Green exterior color choice. Fuel economy estimated in accordance with European standard is around 65 miles per imperial gallon (4.3 L/100 km; 54 mpg_{‑US}) and CO_{2} emissions of 104 g/km. It has the lowest carbon emission of automatic car in the B-segment. When the car is driven in a low and steady speed, the car switches to EV mode, and releases no carbon emissions: the engine shuts down, and the car is powered solely by the electric motor.

A compact Intelligent Power Unit (IPU) is located under the rear cargo area, the Jazz Hybrid maintains the same fully adjustable seating configuration as the petrol-powered model and the same spacious area for optimum use and storage.

With the fuel tank placed in the center, plus an ultra-thin electric motor and compact IPU, it claims to achieve an efficient weight distribution.

In an interview, Kohei Hitomi, the project leader of Fit hybrid, admitted that lowering CO_{2} further will affect some attributes that buyers of the car value: a bigger electric motor and battery sacrifice spaces utility, and improving aerodynamics might make side mirrors smaller. He said there are benefits for customers to keep all the versatility. The drivetrain is the same drive system as the Honda Insight. The advantages of the system are low cost, low weight and that it can be combined with either manual transmission or continuous variable transmission. The car is better-suited than its diesel competitors in areas where superminis are most common: city centres. It is more economical in urban conditions. Thanks to the instant torque of the electric motor, it has a much better engine response.

The hybrid version was not available in the United States. According to Koichi Kondo, Executive Vice President of Honda:

"As for the future, it's open to question. We will carefully be watching the market situation." Hitomi, as reported by Automotive News, believed that the second-generation Fit offered in the North American market had very good fuel mileage, as it was and questioned if buyers were willing to pay extra for marginal mileage gains.

It is reported about 86,000 Fit Hybrid are sold in 2011.

In Malaysia, the Fit hybrid was called Jazz hybrid. Honda introduced the hybrid model to Malaysia in March 2012.

Honda produced the Jazz hybrid in Malaysia from late 2012. Honda was the largest hybrid vehicle seller in Malaysia in 2011 and by 2012 Malaysia was Honda's largest hybrid vehicle market in Southeast Asia.

It was reported that Honda would introduce the Fit hybrid to China during 2012.

The Jazz hybrid was launched in Thailand in July 2012, the first hybrid in the country's subcompact market. First time buyers of the car were eligible for Thai government's first car tax rebate. The hybrid model is assembled in Thailand.

== Fit Shuttle and Fit Shuttle hybrid (2011) ==
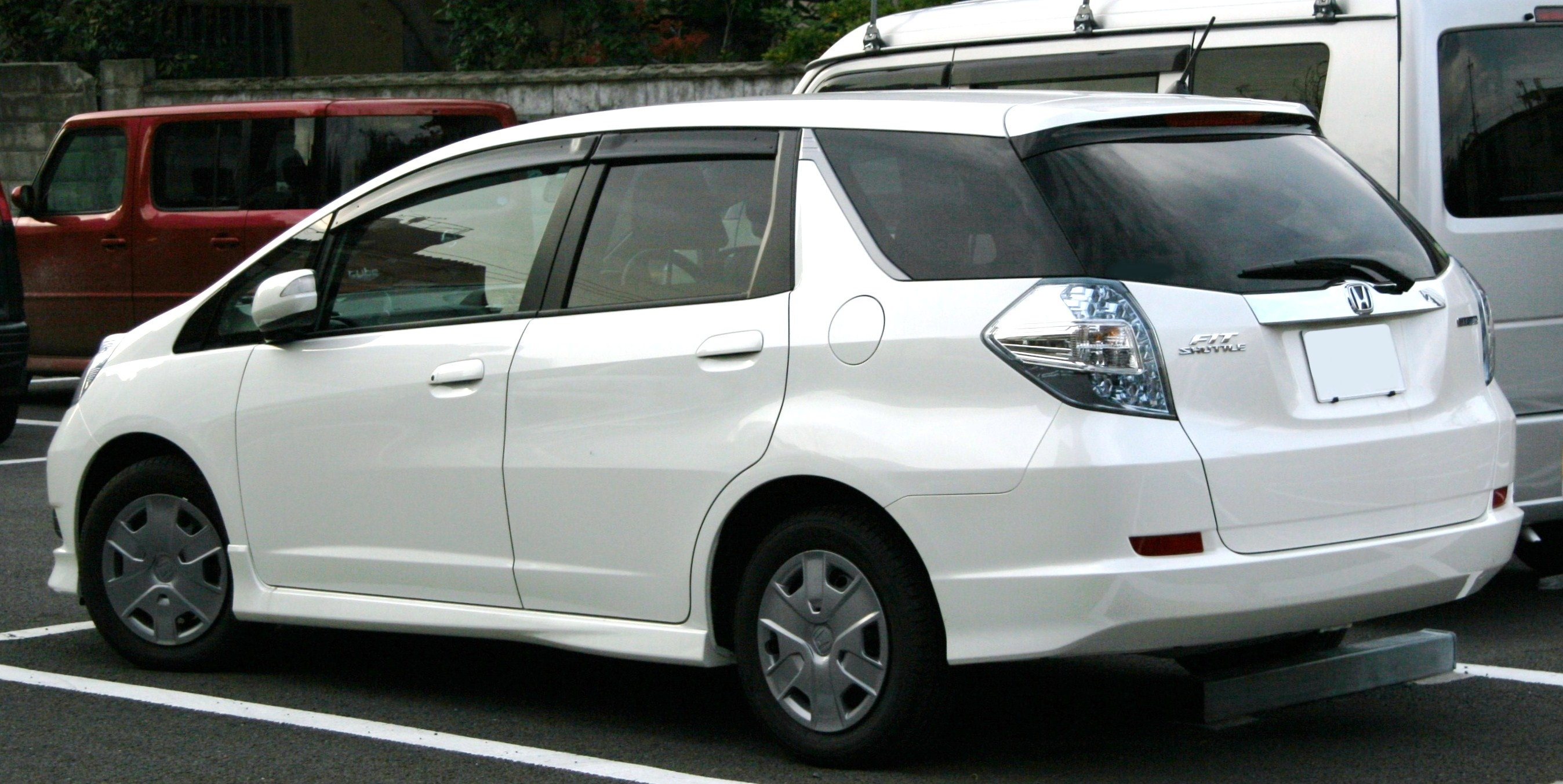
Honda Fit Shuttle Hybrid

The Fit Shuttle is a compact station wagon derived from the second generation Fit and is available in Japan's domestic market. The Shuttle is also a successor to the station wagon variant of first generation Fit, sold as the Airwave. The car leverages the efficient packaging of Fit and Fit hybrid.

The launch of the car in June 2011 was pushed back from March as a result of the earthquake and tsunami in Japan on March 11, 2011. Production of the car was transferred from Honda's Sayama plant in Saitama Prefecture to Suzuka plant in Mie Prefecture as a result of power rationing after the quake. Production began in early May 2011. The Fit Shuttle was shortlisted for Car of The Year Japan 2012.

Its drivetrains are shared with the Fit. The Fit Shuttle has a 1.5-litre i-VTEC engine with 120 PS (118 hp; 88 kW), which was optional in Japan's Fit. A hybrid version, the Fit Shuttle hybrid, was also available, with a 1.3-litre i-VTEC engine with IMA. Continuously variable transmission was the only transmission available for FWD models. A five-speed automatic transmission was standard on four-wheel-drive models.

The fuel efficiency of the station wagon and its hybrid variant was enhanced to be the same as that of Fit and Fit hybrid by reducing engine friction, front brake rolling resistance, improvement in aerodynamics and improvement of control efficiency of the hybrid system. All models feature ECON Mode for enhancing real-world fuel economy. Hybrid model has Eco Assist (Ecological Drive Assist System) to help the driver engage in fuel-efficient driving practices. It went on sale on 16 June 2011, in Japan.

The Fit Shuttle comes with a double-hinged two-piece load floor that both allows access to an under-floor storage bin and also functions as a divider for the cargo area. Through better sound dampening and insulation, the Fit Shuttle is pledged to be as quiet as a mid-size sedan.

== Fit EV ==
Honda showed a concept electric vehicle with the Honda Fit styling in 2010, and did a limited production of Honda Fit EV in 2013–2015.

=== Concept vehicle ===
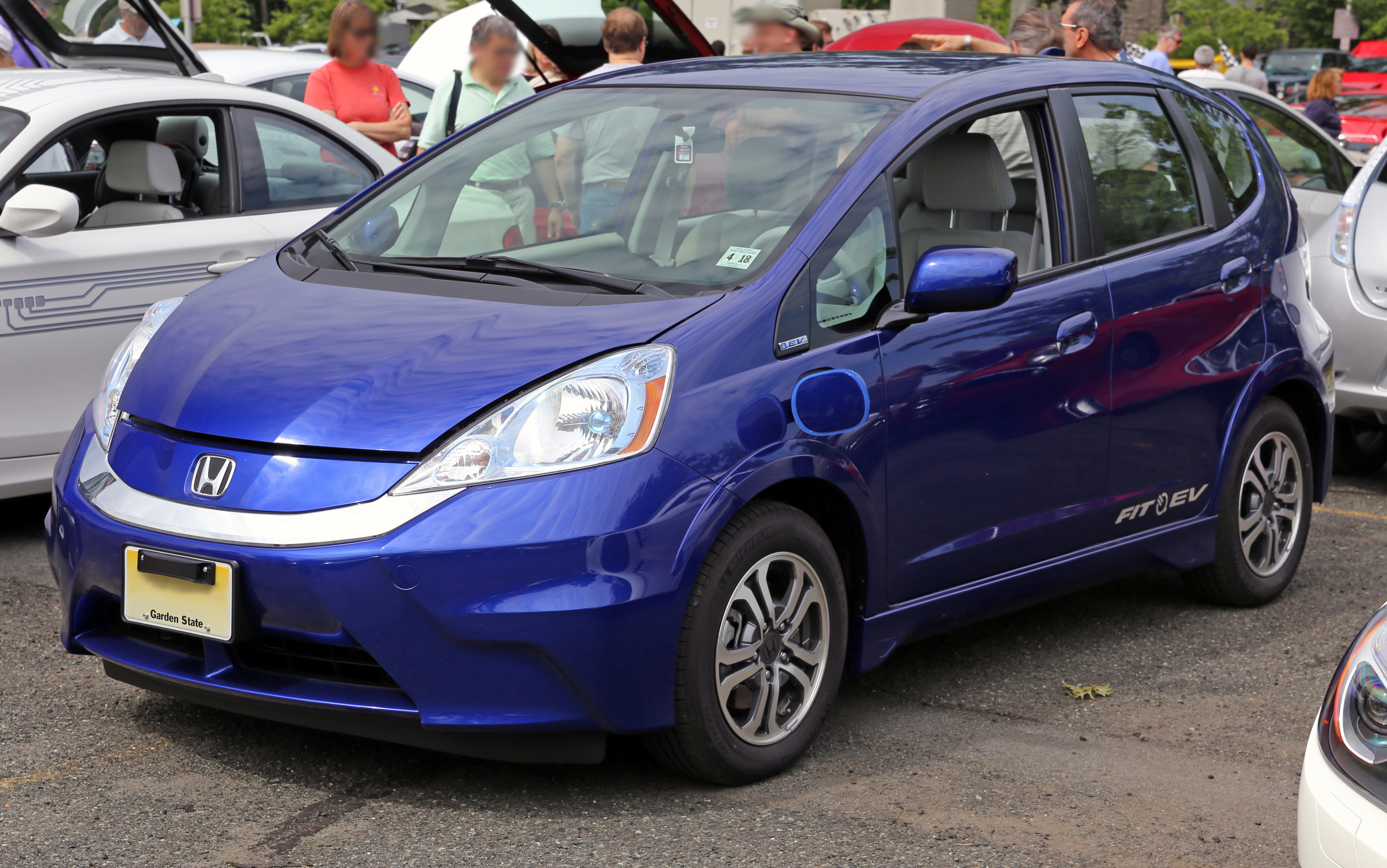
2013 model year Honda Fit EV electric car

The Fit EV concept electric car had its global debut at the 2010 Los Angeles Auto Show. The concept used a motor derived from the Honda FCX Clarity hydrogen fuel cell vehicle, that, in sport mode, gave the driving feel of a car with a 2.0-litre petrol engine. The vehicle was paired with an exclusive interactive key fob that enable the driver to view the battery's state of charge, initiate charging, and activated the vehicle's climate control all without a cell-phone or an Internet connection. The car could also pair with mobile app and web site that allowed drivers to set the vehicle's charging schedule for the best utility rates, locate charging stations and request 24/7 roadside assistance.

=== Demonstration program ===
Honda started the Electric Vehicle Testing Program in the cities of Saitama, Kumagaya and Chichibu, Saitama Prefecture, and Amakusa area, Kumamoto Prefecture, Japan, for its next-generation personal mobility products, including the Fit EV in December 2010.

A demonstration program with pre-production vehicles began in Guangzhou, China in early November 2011. Another program, called Honda Electric Vehicle Demonstration Program, took place in California, in partnership with Stanford University, the city of Torrance and Google. The electric vehicle joined Google's GFleet, a car-sharing service for employees. Stanford used the electric vehicle to study differences in the psychological and physical reaction of using battery-electric vehicles and driving a traditional petrol-powered vehicle.

The first 2013 Fit EV demonstrator was delivered to the city of Torrance in January 2012. Stanford and Google received their demonstrators in February 2012.

=== Production model ===
The 2013 model year production Fit EV was unveiled at the November 2011 Los Angeles Auto Show. Vehicles for the U.S. market were limited to 1,100 units through October 2014. Honda began deliveries of the Fit EV in the United States in July 2012, and the car was available only through leasing at a price of US$389 per month for three years, based on base price of US$36,625, and later the monthly lease payment was reduced to US$259 for all customers effective from June 2013.

Initial availability was limited to California and Oregon, and sales were scheduled to begin in selected markets in Massachusetts, Connecticut, Maryland, New York, and New Jersey by late February 2013. Certified dealers for Fit EV increased from 36 to 200 by the middle of 2013. The Fit EV was released through leasing to local government and corporate customers in Japan in August 2012. Availability in Japan was limited to 200 units during its first two years.

The car was based on the Fit compact car platform, powered by a lithium-ion battery pack combined with an AC synchronous, permanent magnet coaxial traction motor and low-friction reduction gearbox borrowed from the Honda FCX Clarity hydrogen fuel cell vehicle. Honda said the Fit EV concept had an all-electric range of 70 to 100 miles (110 to 160 km) and a top speed of 90 miles per hour (140 km/h). Honda also said that recharging the Fit EV would take 12 hours from a 120-volt outlet and four hours with a 240-volt supply.

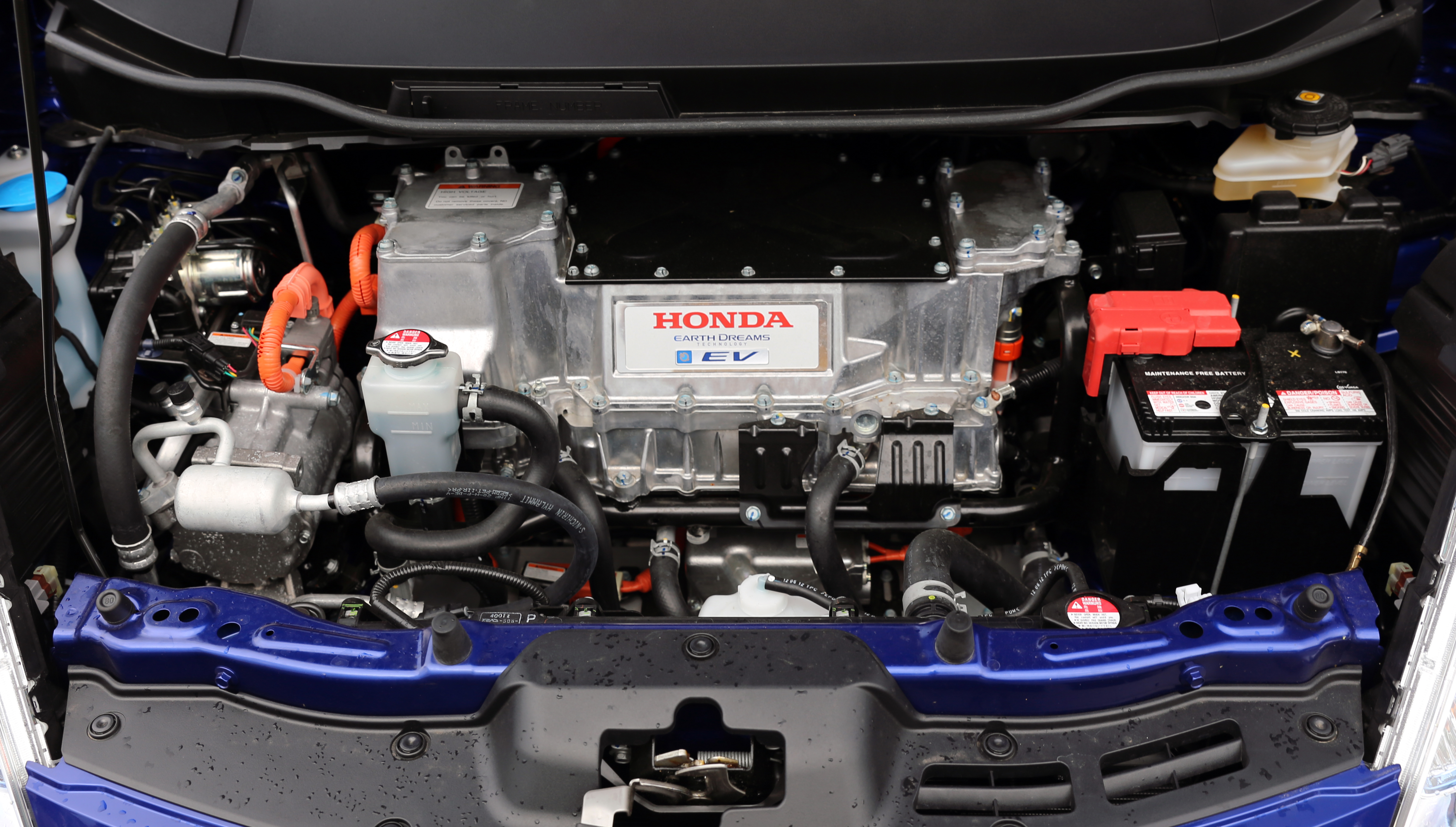
Electrical engine of Honda Fit EV

The United States Environmental Protection Agency official range was 82 mi (132 km) and the agency rated the Fit EV combined fuel economy at 118 miles per gallon gasoline equivalent (2.0 L/100 km), at the time, the highest of any electric car available in the U.S. market, topping Mitsubishi i MiEV, rated with a combined 112 MPGe (2.1 L/100 km). The Fit EV was surpassed in December 2012 by Scion iQ EV, a two-seater, with a rating of 121 MPGe combined. Energy consumption was 29 kW·h per 100 miles, and the fuel economy rating for city driving was 132 MPGe (1.8 L/100 km) and 105 MPGe (2.2 L/100 km) for highway. Under the Japanese JC08 test, the Fit EV achieved the current best AC energy consumption rate of 106 Wh/km and a range of 225 km (140 mi). The Fit EV employed Toshiba's SCiB batteries that could be recharged to 80% capacity in 15 minutes and could be recharged up to 4,000 times, more than 2.5 times that of other Li-ion batteries. The battery cells used lithium titanate oxide in the anode, providing rapid charge times and extending battery life. It also provided stable discharge from extremely cold (-30 °C) to high temperature above 40 °C. According to Honda, the SCiB battery could charge in about half the time of a typical Li-ion battery.

The Honda Fit EV, like the Honda CR-Z hybrid, had three distinct driving modes: econ, normal, and sport. Honda explained that "econ" mode extended driving range by 17% compared to the normal mode; in sport mode, the Fit EV imitated the acceleration of a small car with a 2.0-litre petrol engine. The production version was equipped with a 20 kWh lithium-ion battery and 92 kW coaxial electric motor. Its electric motor was up to 98 percent efficient, contrast to the typical 15 percent efficiency of a petrol engine. Honda estimated the Fit EV range at 123 mi (198 km) for city driving, and 76 mi (122 km) for combined city and highway. The battery could be recharged in four hours from a 240-volt outlet.

In July 2014, Honda announced the end of production of the Fit EV for the 2015 model, together with the Honda Insight hybrid and the Honda FCX Clarity hydrogen fuel-cell car. A total of 1,070 new units were leased in the United States through April 2015. In March 2015 Honda offered a two-year lease extension to existing lessees, and also to new customers on used cars, at a reduced priced of US$199 a month with no down payment. In both cases there was no purchase option at the end of the lease.

== Safety ==
2009 Fit NHTSA scores
Overall:	5/5 stars
Frontal Driver:	5/5 stars
Frontal Passenger:	5/5 stars
Side Driver Impact:	5/5 stars
Side Rear Passenger Impact:	4/5 stars
Rollover:	/ 12.4%

ANCAP test results Honda Jazz GLI 5 door hatch with side curtain airbags (2008)
Test	Score
Overall	4 /5 stars
Frontal offset	14.42/16
Side impact	15.68/16
Pole	2/2
Seat belt reminders	3/3
Whiplash protection	Not Assessed
Pedestrian protection	Adequate
Electronic stability control	Not Available

ANCAP test results Honda Jazz variants with dual frontal airbags (2008)
Test	Score
Overall	4 /5 stars
Frontal offset	14.42/16
Side impact	15.56/16
Pole	Not Assessed
Seat belt reminders	1/3
Whiplash protection	Not Assessed
Pedestrian protection	Adequate
Electronic stability control	Not Available

ANCAP test results Honda Jazz all variants with ESC and 6 airbags (2008)
Test	Score
Overall	5 /5 stars
Frontal offset	14.42/16
Side impact	15.68/16
Pole	2/2
Seat belt reminders	3/3
Whiplash protection	Not Assessed
Pedestrian protection	Adequate
Electronic stability control	Standard

ANCAP test results Honda Jazz all variants (2011)
Test	Score
Overall	5 /5 stars
Frontal offset	14.42/16
Side impact	15.68/16
Pole	2/2
Seat belt reminders	3/3
Whiplash protection	Good
Pedestrian protection	Adequate
Electronic stability control	Standard
