= I-Shift =

I-Shift may refer to:

- Honda I-SHIFT, a transmission system offered with some Honda cars
- Volvo I-Shift, a transmission system offered with most Volvo trucks and buses
- I-mutation, a vowel shift in linguistics
