= Dacia Easy-R =

Type of automated manual transmission

The Dacia Easy-R is an automated manual transmission used by Renault and Dacia that uses electro-mechanical actuation (rather than electro-hydraulic actuation) to automate the gear shifts. The Easy-R uses a traditional manual gearbox with a computer-controlled, electronic clutch; the gear shifts are automatic, and the need for a clutch pedal is eliminated. The number of parts has been reduced by a quarter, ensuring better reliability and simplified maintenance.

Easy-R was available in the Logan, Logan MCV, and Sandero models. It was also available in the Duster and currently it is still available in the Renault Kwid and Renault Triber. There are two versions: the 5-speed JS3 used in petrol engines and the 6-speed TS4 001 used in diesel engines.

The Dacia Easy-R gearbox was a resounding failure, and between 2020 and 2025 Dacia used CVT gearboxes on its models (except for the Duster, which used a 6-speed DCT). Since 2025, Dacia uses a 6-speed EDC for all its models.

== Operation ==
The Easy-R transmission has the following gears: R, N, D, M+, M-

- R is the reverse gear. It is similar to R in both traditional manual and in fully-automatic transmissions.
- N is the neutral gear. It is similar to N in both traditional manual and fully-automatic transmissions.
- D is the drive gear. It is the equivalent to D in a fully-automatic transmission. The gearbox in an AMT car is a manual gearbox, instead of one with a torque converter as in a traditional automatic transmission.
- M- downshifts a gear in a sequential fashion, from M5 (M6 in 6-speed AMT cars) to M1.
- M+ up-shifts a gear in a sequential fashion, from M1 to M5 (M6 in 6-speed AMT cars).

== See also ==
- Automatic transmission
- Direct-Shift Gearbox
- Honda I-SHIFT
- Multimode manual transmission
- Saab Sensonic
- Semi-automatic transmission
- Tiptronic
