= NAVi5 =

The "New Advanced Vehicle with Intelligence 5-speed" (NAVi5, also sometimes written "NAVI5" or "NAVI-5") is an automated manual transmission developed by Isuzu of Japan, and introduced in August 1984. It was initially developed for use in trucks, but was first made available in Isuzu's Aska sedan and subsequently the Gemini and their other Japanese domestic market vehicles. It preceded the likes of Alfa Romeo’s Selespeed and Opel’s Easytronic by more than a decade. It was superseded by the Smoother transmission in newer trucks.

== Models ==
The NAVi5 was used in the following Isuzu vehicles:

Model	Years
Aska	August 1984-1989
Gemini (2nd generation)	April 1986-1990
Elf (Light-duty truck)	December 1986-?
Cubic (Bus)	1989-?

Isuzu added the NAVi6, a six-speed version, to the following trucks:

Model	Years
Forward (Medium-duty truck)	?-?
810 (Heavy-duty truck)	September 1986-?

== Features ==
Early NAVi5 shift lever (Isuzu Aska) 1: The first gear only. 2: The second gear only. D3 (Also labeled “Power"): The first three gears available. D5: All five gears available. R: Reverse.

Unlike "traditional" automatic gearboxes with a torque converter and planetary gears, the mechanical aspects of the NAVi5 are identical to those of a conventional five-speed manual transmission with a dry-clutch. The shifting and clutch operations though, are done automatically by two hydraulic actuators connected to an electronic computer (an 8-bit unit with 8 KB ROM and 192 KB RAM).

The early version of the NAVi5 only had an automatic mode with an ability to lock out certain gears, thus operating in a manner similar to a traditional automatic. The later version added a manual mode, enabling the driver to select specific gears. The NAVi5 also came with autocruise and Hill-Start Aid as standard features.

A Japanese television commercial for the Aska heralded NAVi5 as “Not a manual, not a torque converter.”

== Reception ==
The customer reactions toward the NAVi5 were mixed. Some liked the more “direct” feel and better fuel economy it offered compared to those of typical automatic gearboxes. Others, however, were turned off by what they felt as awkward shifting program and the acceleration gap during shifting. The NAVi5 also required gentle throttle operations when accelerating from standstill since it didn't offer creep function.

It was outsold by the conventional manual and automatic gearboxes in both the Aska and Gemini and subsequently dropped in the next generation Gemini. (Isuzu stopped manufacturing the Aska in-house after the first generation.)
