= MultiMode manual transmission =

Type of automated manual transmission

A MultiMode manual transmission (MMT or M/M) is a type of automated manual transmission offered by Toyota. It uses a traditional manual gearbox with a computer-controlled clutch actuated by permanent magnet motors. Multimode Manual Transmission is available in the Aygo, Yaris, Corolla, Corolla Verso, Mark X and Auris in Europe, and should not be confused with Multimode Automatic Transmission, which is offered in the North American market by Toyota.

== Operation ==
The Multimode Manual Transmission has the following gears: R, N, E, M+, M−.

- R: R is the reverse gear. It is similar to R in both traditional manual and in fully automatic cars.
- N: N is the neutral gear. It is similar to N in both traditional manual and full automatic.
- E: E is the functional equivalent of D in a full automatic. As the gearbox in a MMT car is a manual gearbox, instead of one with a torque converter (as in a traditional automatic), gear changes are noticeable. The accelerator should be eased off, slightly, when gear changes occur. This facilitates a smooth transition, between gears, and allows for smooth acceleration.
- M+: Up-shifts a gear in sequential fashion, from M1 to M5 (M6 in 6-speed MMT cars).
- M- : Downshifts a gear in sequential fashion, from M5 (M6 in 6-speed MMT cars) to M1.

== Differences from an automatic car ==
A Multimode manual car has a clutch instead of a torque converter. As such, gear changes are noticeable, and the car rolls backwards when on an up-sloping incline.

- Creeping: A Multimode Manual Car creeps forward when the brake pedal is released and accelerator is not depressed, like an automatic car. This is achieved via partially engaging and slipping the clutch.
- Moving off from an incline: A MMT car rolls backwards when on an up-sloping incline, unlike an automatic car. To move off from an up-sloping incline, apply handbrake before depressing the accelerator slightly. Do not hold the car on an incline by depressing the accelerator pedal, as the slipping clutch will overheat and lead to clutch damage.
- Parking: Unlike an automatic car, the P gear is absent in a MMT car. The car should be parked in the following fashion. In an up-sloping incline, put the gear to M1, or E, apply handbrake, and switch off the engine. In a down-sloping incline, put the gear to R, apply handbrake, and switch off the engine. On level ground, put the gear to R, apply handbrake, and switch off the engine. R or E/M1 substitute the P function in a full automatic.
- Moving off from Park: The engine can only be started with the gear in N. To start, switch on the car to ON position (this releases the gear lock), depress brake pedal, put the gear to N (from either R or E/M1), and switch on the engine.
- L/1 and 2 gears in a full automatic: The MMT does not provide L/1 and 2 gears as in a full automatic. One action of the MMT system is that it detects the gradient of the slope that the car is situated in. On a down-sloping incline and if the brake pedal is depressed, it automatically selects a lower gear to produce engine brake, which has the equivalent effect of L and 2 gears in a full automatic. L and 2 can also be substituted with E1 and E2 (not available in Aygo) or M1 and M2 gears in a MMT car. To select E1 or E2, put the gear to E, and use + and - pedal flaps on the steering wheel to override the computer selection. E will change to E1/E2/E3/E4/E5/E6, depending on the gear selected. Downshift to E1 or E2 as appropriate to simulate L and 2 gears in a full automatic. To select M1 or M2, put the gear to M, and use M− gear to downshift the gear to M1 or M2.
- Kick-down: In E mode, the kick-down function in a full automatic can be similarly activated in an MMT car. Additionally, the kick-down function can be manually activated using the - pedal flap on the steering wheel in E mode. This overrides the computer setting and E changes to E1/E2/E3/E4/E5/E6. To stop the manual override under E mode, pull and hold the + flap on the steering wheel, until the E1/E2/E3/E4/E5/E6 changes back to E. Alternatively, wait for the next computer activated gear change.
- Reverse: The car reverses as in an automatic car. To reverse, depress brake pedal, and change the gear to R. Gradually lift off the brake pedal to allow the car to creep backwards. On a down-sloping incline, the creep function, simulated using the slipping clutch, is not sufficient to prevent the car from rolling forward. In this case, the car must not be held still using the accelerator pedal, as the excessive clutch slipping will lead to clutch damage. Handbrake should be instead applied, and the accelerator pedal should be depressed slightly.
- Gear change: The gear change in MMT is noticeable, unlike in a full automatic car. Under E gear, the car will automatically change the gear depending on speed and gradient information. It is recommended that the accelerator pedal should be momentarily lifted off during gear change. A constant throttle can also be maintained on the accelerator, and gear change can still occur, although the car will feel noticeably more jerky during gear change than in a full automatic.

== Operation under E mode ==
The E mode functions as the "D" position in a conventional automatic car. Via the onboard computer and electronic clutch, the car automatically selects the appropriate gear based on speed and gradient information. An MMT car limits the highest gear selectable, if the gradient is steep.

- L and 2 gear in a full automatic: The L and 2 gear in automatic can be simulated in an MMT car by either using E1/E2 or M1/M2.
- Es mode: Es mode allows more dynamic and sporty driving with faster gear changes, at the expense of greater fuel consumption. Es mode is available in the Yaris and Auris (in Europe). Es mode is similar to the S mode in Direct-Shift Gearbox.

== Operation under M mode ==
Under M mode, sequential gear shifts can be made by changing the gear to M+ and M−. Under M mode, the gear selected will be displayed as one of M1/M2/M3/M4/M5/M6 on the dashboard. Under M mode, the gear will not change even if the engine RPM reaches redline, which will probably lead to engine damage. However, the user is prevented from excessively downshifting to a gear that exceeds the maximum revolution possible for the engine, or excessively upshifting to a gear that may lead the engine to stall. When the car is braked to a complete stop, the M1 gear is automatically selected.

== Competitors ==
Operationally similar systems are the Direct-Shift Gearbox offered by Volkswagen AG, Selespeed offered by Alfa Romeo, I-SHIFT offered by Honda, Auto Gear Shift offered by Suzuki, ESCOT by UD Trucks, and Dacia Easy-R by Renault Group's Dacia. Other technologies that produce automatic transmissions are the conventional automatic transmission and continuously variable transmission. For example, continuously variable transmission is implemented as the MultiDrive S in Toyota iQ.

== See also ==
- Automated manual transmission
- Honda I-SHIFT
- Direct-Shift Gearbox
- Automatic transmission
- Tiptronic
