= ZF AS Tronic =

Automated manual transmission

ZF AS Tronic is an automated manual transmission made by ZF Friedrichshafen for the bus, motorcoach and lorry market in Europe and North America. It was first introduced in 2003. As is the case with most automated-manual transmissions, it lacks the torque converter that is standard on conventional automatic transmissions. The AS Tronic is claimed to be 500 pounds less than the ZF B500 torque-converter conventional automatic transmission range.

The transmission is offered as 6-speed (referred to as AS Tronic Lite by ZF), along with the core10-speed 12-speed or 16-speed units.
