= Automated manual transmission =

Type of multi-speed motor vehicle transmission system

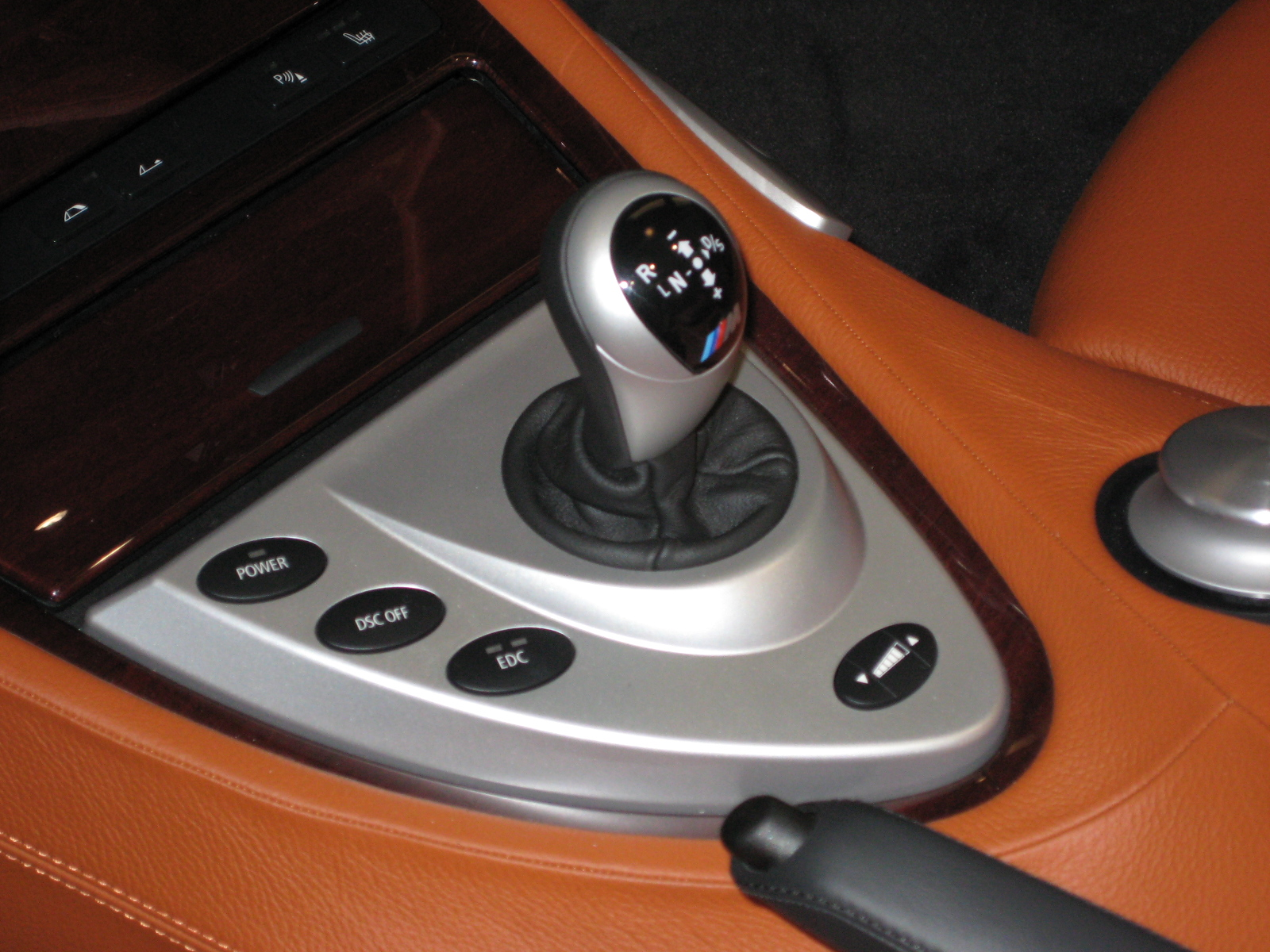
Mid-2000s BMW SMG-III shifter, with a selector for the shift speed located below the shifter

The automated manual transmission (AMT) is a type of transmission for motor vehicles. It is essentially a conventional manual transmission equipped with automatic actuation to operate the clutch and/or shift gears.

Many early versions of these transmissions that are semi-automatic in operation, such as Autostick, which automatically control only the clutch – often using various forms of clutch actuation, such as electro-mechanical, hydraulic, pneumatic, or vacuum actuation – but still require the driver's manual input and full control to initiate gear changes by hand. These systems that require manual shifting are also referred to as clutchless manual systems. Modern versions of these systems that are fully automatic in operation, such as Selespeed and Easytronic, can control both the clutch operation and the gear shifts automatically, by means of an ECU, therefore requiring no manual intervention or driver input for gear changes.

The usage of modern computer-controlled AMTs in passenger cars increased during the mid-1990s, as a more sporting alternative to the traditional hydraulic automatic transmission. During the 2010s, AMTs were largely replaced by the increasingly widespread dual-clutch transmission, but remained popular for smaller cars in Europe and some developing markets, particularly India, where it is notably favored over conventional automatic and CVT transmissions due to its lower cost.

== Design and operation ==
Automated manual transmissions can be semi-automatic or fully-automatic in operation. Several different systems to automate the clutch and/or shifting have been used over the years, but they will generally use one of the following methods of actuation for the clutch and/or shifting: hydraulic or electro-hydraulic actuation, electro-mechanical, pneumatic, electromagnetic, or even purely electrical using an electric motor.

Gear shifting, clutch actuation, shift-timing, and rev-matching are all under automated control via electronic sensors, computers, and actuators. When shifting gears, the driver selects the desired gear with the transmission shift lever, while electronic sensors and actuators connected to a TCU (transmission computer) or microprocessor will automatically operate the clutch and throttle to match revs and to re-engage the clutch in milliseconds. Torque and power transfer to the drive wheels will also be electronically controlled. Most modern implementations of this transmission function are in a sequential mode, where the driver can upshift or downshift by only one gear at a time. However, this is not the case for all modern transmissions. For example, BMW's "SMG" and Ferrari's "F1" transmission can skip gears on both downshifts and upshifts, when selecting gears manually via the steering wheel-mounted paddle shifters, as seen on most modern transmissions. Older clutchless manual transmissions (mostly prior to the 1990s) will retain H-pattern shifters, plus the shift gate, and will require the driver to select the required gear ratios manually. The clutch, however, will be a servo-controlled unit, connected to various actuators, a solenoid and sensors which control the clutch automatically.

Another alternate means of clutch automation is the "clutch-by-wire" system. The system generally uses an electric actuator and electronic sensors, which replace the mechanical clutch linkage or hydraulic clutch connection, to monitor and control clutch positioning, completely replacing the hydraulic linkage between the mechanical clutch and pedal itself with a single electro-mechanical actuator.

Depending on the mechanical build and design, some (mostly modern) automated manual transmissions will automatically shift gears at appropriate points (like a conventional automatic transmission), while traditional semi-automatic and clutchless manuals require the driver to manually select the gear even when the engine is at redline, since they automate only part of the transmission (namely the clutch), and will not shift gears by themselves. Despite the superficial similarity, automated manual transmissions differ significantly in internal operation and driver's "feel" from a manumatic, the latter of which is an automatic transmission (automatics use a torque converter instead of a clutch like in an automated manual, to manage the mechanical linkage between the transmission and motor) with the ability to override the automatic transmission's computer, and actuate shifts manually.

Add-on AMTs can also function as a regular manual gearbox (with a manual shift lever), whereas integrated AMTs do not need a "normal" shift layout, so they can be designed with an optimized AMT shifting layout (which would have an unusual pattern to manually shift). Integrated AMTs either have gear-selector drums (which allows only serial shifting and no gear-skipping, but this system is fairly inexpensive, because it needs only one actuator), or single actuators. Single-actuator systems require one actuator for each shifting sleeve (which is why this type of system is more expensive, but it also shifts faster). The actuators can either be electro-hydraulic (more expensive, but faster, well-suited for single-actuator systems, and allow for higher torque), or electro-mechanical (less expensive, but usually limited to 250 N·m (184.5 lb-ft) of gearbox input torque). This limit is because the clutch actuation force increases with higher torque, and short shifting times; electro-mechanical actuators are just electric motors – using larger motors reduces the motor dynamics due to the motors' higher mass moment of inertia (which is not good for fast shifting), and bigger motors also put more stress on the car's 12-volt electrical system. As a result, one can have either slow shifting and a very large lead-acid battery (not suitable for cars), or fast shifting and a smaller battery (works up to 250 N·m of torque).

Modern AMTs, such as Suzuki Auto Gear Shift and Dacia/Renault Easy-R, usually operate in conjunction with electronic throttle control to initiate gear shifts based on certain RPM and/or throttle position.

== Usage in passenger cars ==
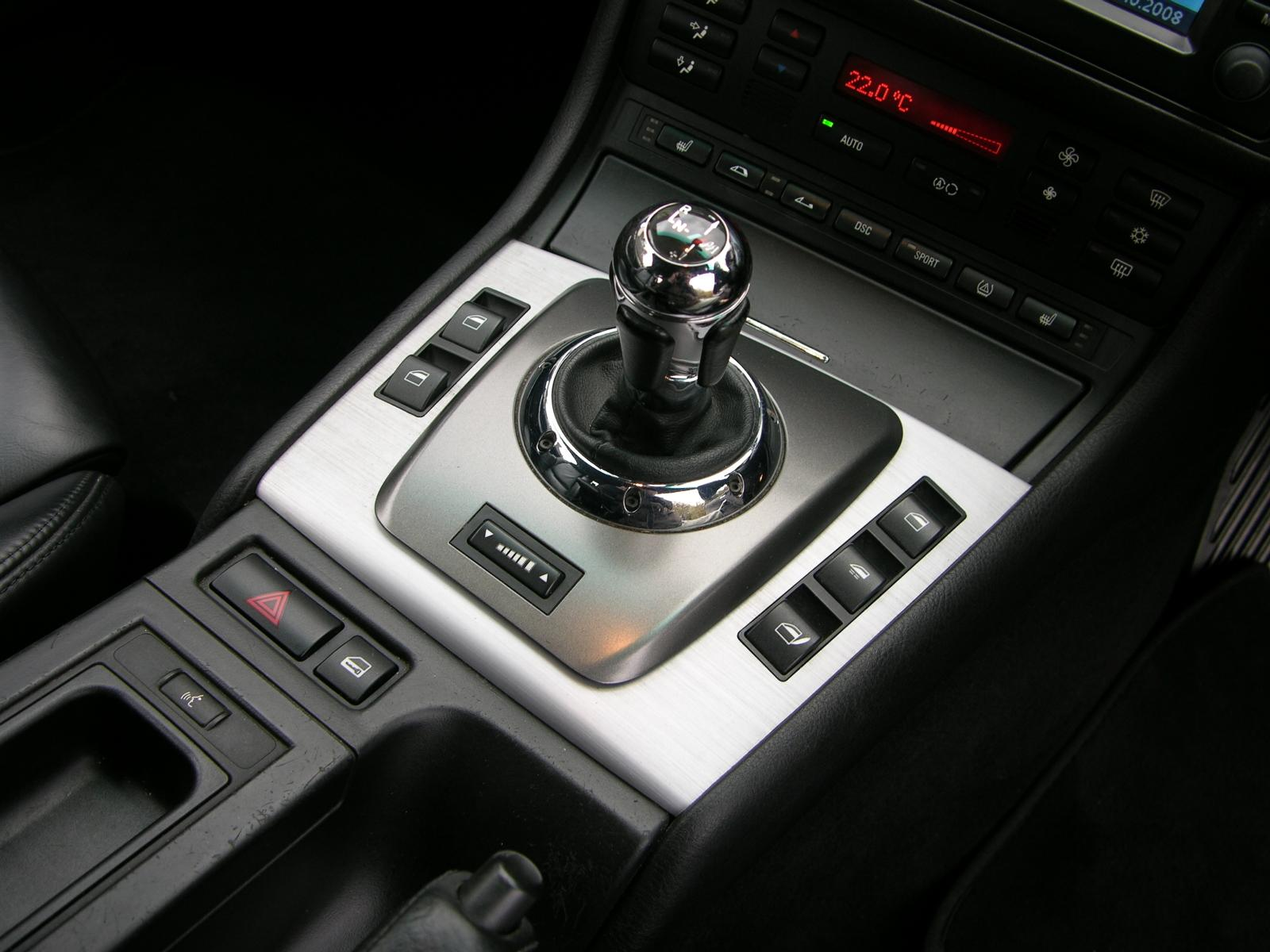
2000–2006 BMW SMG-II shifter

The automated manual transmission has its origins in early clutchless manual transmissions that began to appear on mass-production cars in the 1940s and 1950s. An early example of this transmission was introduced with the Hudson Commodore in 1942, called Drive-Master. This unit was an early semi-automatic transmission, based on the design of a conventional manual transmission which used a servo-controlled vacuum-operated clutch system, with three different gear shifting modes, at the touch of a button; manual shifting and manual clutch operation (fully-manual), manual shifting with automated clutch operation (semi-automatic), and automatic shifting with automatic clutch operation (fully-automatic).

Another early example is the 1955 Citroën DS, which used a 4-speed "BVH" transmission. This semi-automatic transmission used an automated clutch, which was actuated using hydraulics. Gear selection also used hydraulics, however, the gear ratio needs to be manually selected by the driver. The 1956 Renault Dauphine 3-speed manual transmission was available with an optional Ferlec automated clutch, which used an electromagnetically operated clutch system. Other clutchless manual transmissions included the 1967 NSU Ro 80 (3-speed Fichtel & Sachs) and 1967 Porsche 911 (4-speed Sportomatic), both of which used vacuum-actuated clutches and hydraulic torque converters. The 1968 Volkswagen Beetle and Volkswagen Karmann Ghia offered a 3-speed Autostick transmission, which used an electric switch on the gear shifter connected to a solenoid, to operate the electro-pneumatic vacuum clutch servo.

In 1963, Renault switched from the automated clutch to a fully-automatic 3-speed Jager transmission, which consisted of an electro-mechanical control unit that operated both the clutch and shifting, effectively making it one of the earliest automated manual transmissions. The Jager transmission was controlled via dash-mounted electronic push-buttons.

The Isuzu NAVi5 5-speed automatic transmission was introduced in the 1984 Isuzu Aska mid-size sedan (sold in the Japanese domestic market only). This transmission, originally designed for trucks, was based on a manual transmission with the addition of hydraulic actuators for the gear shifter and the clutch. Initial versions did not allow direct selection of gear ratios, instead allowing drivers only to lock out higher gears (as per many traditional automatic transmissions). Later versions added a manual mode, allowing the driver to control the gear selection.

Several companies owned by Fiat S.p.A. were influential in the development of automated manual transmissions. Ferrari's involvement with automated manual transmission began with the 7-speed semi-automatic paddle shift transmission used in the 1989 Ferrari 640 Formula One racing car. In 1992, the Ferrari Mondial T introduced the option of a "Valeo" 5-speed semi-automatic transmission. This transmission used an electro-mechanical actuator to automatically operate the clutch, while the gearshift mechanism was a standard H-pattern shifter operated as per normal transmissions. In 1997, the Ferrari F355 became available with an "F1" 6-speed transmission, which uses paddle shifters located behind the steering wheel or can be driven in a fully-automatic mode. The F355's successors offered similar transmissions, until the company switched to a dual-clutch transmission for the Ferrari 458 in 2009.

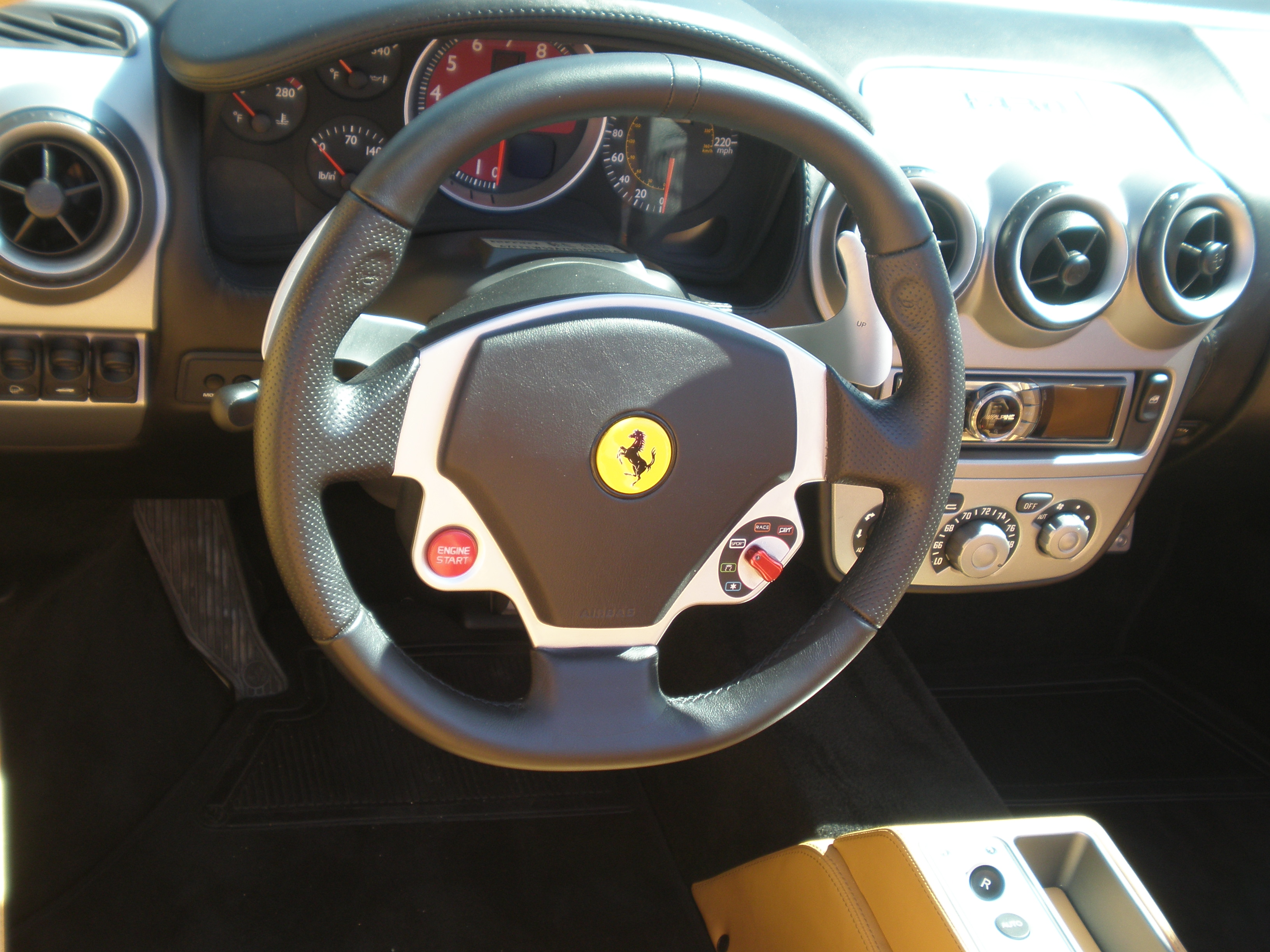
Ferrari F430 F1 steering wheel with paddle shifters

Sister company Alfa Romeo introduced the related Selespeed 5-speed automatic transmission for the Alfa Romeo 156 in 1999. This was followed by Maserati's 2001 introduction of the related Cambiocorsa 6-speed automatic transmission in the Maserati Coupé. Selespeed was also used in the Fiat Punto and Stilo models.

BMW's involvement with automated manual transmissions began in 1993, when the "Shift-tronic" 6-speed semi-automatic was offered on the Alpina B12 coupe (based on the E31 850CSi). Using an automated clutch paired to a standard H-pattern shifter (as per the Ferrari Mondial T), the transmission was supplied by LuK and fitted to less than 40 cars. Mass-production of automated manual transmissions began for BMW in 1997 with the introduction of the "SMG" 6-speed automatic transmission in the E36 M3 coupe. Although the name "SMG" was an abbreviation of "Sequential Manual Gearbox", the transmission internal were as per a typical (synchromesh-equipped) manual transmission, not a true sequential manual transmission. The SMG was replaced by the SMG-II when the E46 M3 was introduced in 2000. BMW's final AMT (before being replaced by a dual-clutch transmission) was the 7-speed SMG-III used in the 2004–2010 BMW E60 M5 and related BMW E63 M6. The SMG-III could achieve a shift time of 65 milliseconds in its most aggressive mode

From 2002 to 2007, the third-generation Toyota MR2 was available with an "SMT" 6-speed automated manual transmission. The SMT system utilized an electro-hydraulic activation system for both the clutch and shifting, but no H-pattern shifter like with the standard transmission. Instead, there was a shift lever that could be pulled and pushed forward or backward to upshift and downshift, as well as the addition of electronic steering-wheel-mounted shift buttons.

Brands within the Volkswagen Group have typically used dual-clutch transmissions instead of automated manual transmissions, however a 6-speed "E-gear" automated manual transmission was introduced for the 2004 Lamborghini Murciélago. and Lamborghini Gallardo. The E-gear was used on the successors to the Murciélago and Gallardo, and it was also available on the 2007–2012 Audi R8 (Type 42), marketed as the "R-tronic" transmission.

=== Applications ===
Year of introduction	Manufacturer	Transmission name	Model(s)
1996	Alfa Romeo	Selespeed	156, 147, GT, 159, Brera, Spider
2007	Alfa Romeo	Q-Select	8C Competizione / 8C Spider
2001	Aston Martin	SSM	Vanquish
2005	Aston Martin	Sportshift	Vantage (2005)
2009	Aston Martin	-	One-77
2020	Aston Martin	-	Valkyrie
1999	Audi	-	A2
2006	Audi	R-Tronic	R8 (Type 42)
1997	BMW	SMG	E36 M3
2000	BMW	SMG-II	E46 M3, E46 3 Series, E85 Z4, E60 5 Series, E63 6 Series
2004	BMW	SMG-III	E60 M5, E63 M6
2003	Chery	-	QQ3
2009	Chery	-	M1
1955	Citroën	BVH	DS
1976	Citroën	C-Matic	CX, GS
2004	Citroën	EGS	C1, C4
2003	Citroën	Sensodrive	C2, C3
2011	Citroën	EGS	DS4, DS5
2016	Citroën	-	C6 (China)
2015	Dacia	Easy-R	Logan, Sandero, Duster
2017	Dallara	-	Stradale
1993	Fiat	Selespeed	Punto, Stilo, Grande Punto
1995	Fiat	Dualogic	Bravo, Idea, Palio, Punto, Siena, Uno, Panda, 500L, Doblò, Linea
1997	Fiat	Citymatic	Seicento
2007	Fiat	Comfort-Matic	Fiorino
2018	Fiat	GSR	Argo, Cronos, Mobi
1988	Ferrari	Valeo	Mondial T
1994	Ferrari	F1	355 F1, 360, 575M Maranello, Enzo, 612 Scaglietti, F430, FXX, 599
2004	Ford Europe	Durashift EST	Fusion, Fiesta, Transit
2010	Honda	I-SHIFT	Civic, Jazz
1942	Hudson	Drive-Master	Commodore
1950	Hudson	Supermatic	Commodore
2018	Hyundai	Smart Auto AMT	i10, Aura, Santro
2020	Hyundai	iMT	Venue, i20
1984	Isuzu	NAVi5	Aska, Gemini
2020	Kia	iMT	Sonet, Seltos
2007	Lada (AvtoVAZ)	-	Priora
2015	Lada (AvtoVAZ)	-	Xray, Vesta
2001	Lamborghini	e-gear	Murciélago, Gallardo, Reventón, Sesto Elemento
2011	Lamborghini	ISR	Aventador, Veneno, Centenario, Sián, Countach LPI 800-4
2004	Lancia	DFN	Musa, Ypsilon
2004	Maxus (LDV)	-	Maxus V80, Maxus V90
2010	Lexus	ASG	LFA
2015	Mahindra	Autoshift	TUV300
2019	Mahindra	-	XUV300
2001	Maserati	Cambiocorsa	Coupé and Spyder, MC12
2003	Maserati	DuoSelect	Quattroporte V
2007	Maserati	MC-Shift	GranTurismo
1999	Mercedes-Benz	-	A-Class (W168)
2000	Mercedes-Benz	Sequentronic	CLK-Class (C208)
2001	Mercedes-Benz	Sequentronic	C-Class (W203) & C SportCoupé (CL203)
2001	Mercedes-Benz	Sequentronic	E-Class (W211)
2001	Mercedes-Benz	Sequentronic	SL 350 (R230)
2002	Mercedes-Benz	Sequentronic	CLK-Class (C209)
2021	Mercedes-AMG	-	ONE
2004	Mitsubishi	AllShift	Colt
1967	NSU	-	Ro 80
1999	Pagani	-	Zonda
2011	Pagani	-	Huayra
2005	Peugeot	2-Tronic	107, 1007
2014	Polaris	AutoDrive	Slingshot
1967	Porsche	Sportomatic	911
2005	Proton	AMT	Savvy
1956	Renault	-	Dauphine
2001	Renault	Quickshift	Modus, Twingo
2015	Renault	Easy-R	Kwid, Symbol III, Triber
1994	Saab	Sensonic	900 NG
2012	SEAT	ASG	Mii
2011	ŠKODA	ASG	Citigo
1998	Smart	Softouch	Fortwo, Forfour, Roadster
2013	Spania	-	GTA Spano
2004	SSC North America	-	Ultimate Aero
2020	SSC North America	-	Tuatara
2014	Suzuki/Maruti	AGS	Celerio
2017	Suzuki/Maruti	AGS	Swift Dzire, Ignis
2004	Suzuki/Maruti	-	Swift
2014	Suzuki/Maruti	-	Alto, Wagon R (India, Pakistan & Indonesia)
2008	Tata Motors	Easy Shift	Nano
2017	Tata Motors	Hyprdrive SSG	Nexon, Tiago, Tigor
1999	Toyota	SMT	MR2 (W30)
2005	Toyota	MMT	Aygo, Yaris, Corolla, Corolla Verso, Mark X, Auris
1965	VEB Sachsenring	Hycomat	Trabant 601
2004	Opel/Vauxhall	Easytronic	Corsa, Tigra, Meriva, Astra, Zafira, Vectra, Adam
1968	Volkswagen	Autostick	Beetle, Karmann Ghia
1998	Volkswagen	-	Lupo
2009	Volkswagen	I-Motion	Gol, Voyage
2011	Volkswagen	ASG	Up, Fox
2009	Zenvo	-	ST1

== Usage in semi-trailer trucks / tractor units ==
- Volvo I-Shift: an automated manual transmission; introduced in 2001 and used in trucks and buses. This system is an add-on for the conventional unsynchronized manual transmission.
- ZF AS Tronic: an automated manual transmission; introduced in 2003, and used in trucks, buses, and coaches.
- Eaton AutoShift: introduced in the early 2000s as an add-on to traditional non-synchromesh manual transmission for heavy trucks.
- Isuzu Smoother: Successor of the Japan-only NAVi5, primarily aimed at developing markets.
- Mack mDRIVE and mDRIVE HD: an automated manual transmission with synchronizers; introduced in 2010, and used in Mack semi-trucks.
- Renault Optidriver: an automated manual transmission; introduced in 2004, and used in Renault heavy-duty commercial semi-trucks.
- Daimler Trucks DT12: an automated manual transmission; introduced in 2012, and used in the Freightliner Cascadia semi-truck, and the Western Star 49X line of commercial semi-, crane, and dump trucks.
- Mercedes-Benz PowerShift: A non-synchronous automated manual transmission, used in Mercedes-Benz heavy-duty semi-trucks.
- UD Trucks ESCOT: An add-on for non-synchronized and synchronized manual transmission; introduced in 1995. Six different versions of this transmission have been made: ESCOT, ESCOT-II, ESCOT-III, ESCOT-IV, ESCOT-V, and ESCOT-VI. Used in UD Trucks' range of commercial vehicles.

== See also ==
- Semi-automatic transmission
- Dual-clutch transmission
