= Honda I-SHIFT =

Transmission system offered with some Honda cars

The Honda I-SHIFT is a 6-speed automated manual transmission (a type of transmission with a hydraulic computer-controlled clutch). Honda's I-SHIFT only debuted recently on the European market Honda Civic hatchback, pairing it with the 1.4 i-VTEC and 1.8 i-VTEC engines. Honda Jazz United Kingdom, January 2010 - January 2011, 1.4 i-VTEC, replaced by updated CVT transmission from February 2011.

== See also ==
- MultiMode manual transmission
