= Jota =

Jota may refer to:

- Iota (Ι, ι), the name of the 9th letter in the Greek alphabet
  - (figuratively) Something very small, based on the fact that the letter iota is the smallest character in the alphabet
- The name of the letter J in Spanish and Portuguese
- Jota (music), a type of Spanish music and dance
- Jota (food), an Istrian bean-sauerkraut stew
- Jamboree on the Air (JOTA), an international amateur radio event organised by Scouts;
- Jota Aviation, a British airline.

== People ==
=== Footballers ===
- Jota (footballer, born 1991) (José Ignacio Peleteiro Ramallo), Spanish former footballer, born 1991
- Jota (footballer, born 1993) (João Tiago Serrão Garcês), Portuguese footballer, plays for Nacional (in Portugal's Primeira Liga)
- Jota (footballer, born March 1999) (João Pedro Neves Filipe), Portuguese footballer, plays for Celtic (Scottish Premiership)
- Jota (footballer, born 2006) (Joaquín Domingo Ponce), Spanish footballer, plays for Albacete
- Jota Silva (João Pedro Ferreira Silva), Portuguese footballer, born 1999, plays for Nottingham Forest (English Premier League) and Portugal
- Diogo Jota (Diogo José Teixeira da Silva), Portuguese footballer, 1996–2025, played for Liverpool and Portugal
- Diego Martins (footballer, born 1987), Brazilian footballer, has played for many clubs in various countries
- Kaiya Jota (Kaiya Rose Flintham Jota), Filipino footballer, born 2006

=== Other people ===
- Jota (singer) (born 1994), born Lee Jonghwa, member of K-pop band MADTOWN
- Jota Mario Valencia (1956–2019), Colombian TV presenter
- Jota Carajota (born 2002), Spanish drag queen

== Vehicles ==
- Jota Sport, an English car racing team
- Lancia Jota, a series of truck and bus chassis
- Laverda Jota, an Italian motorcycle
- Mazda Jota MX-5 GT, a model of the Mazda MX-5

=== Lamborghini ===
- Lamborghini Jota (disambiguation)
  - Lamborghini Miura P400 Jota, a model of the Lamborghini Miura
  - Lamborghini Diablo SE30 Jota, a circuit racing version of the Lamborghini Diablo 30th anniversary edition
  - Lamborghini Jota, speculative name used by automotive journalists to refer to development mules of the then yet to be announced Aventador
  - Lamborghini Aventador J, a concept convertible version of the Aventador

== See also ==
- Iota (disambiguation)
- Yota (disambiguation)
- Jot (disambiguation)
