= Lamborghini Jota =

Lamborghini Jota may refer to:

- Lamborghini Miura P400 Jota, a special variant of the Lamborghini Miura
- Lamborghini Diablo SE30 Jota, a circuit racing version of the Lamborghini Diablo 30th anniversary edition
- Lamborghini Jota, speculative name used by automotive journalists to refer to development mules of the then yet to be announced Aventador
- Lamborghini Aventador J, a concept convertible version of the Aventador

== See also ==
- Jota (disambiguation)
