= Iota (disambiguation) =

Iota (Ι, ι) is the ninth letter of the Greek alphabet.

Iota or IOTA may also refer to:

== Letters and scripts ==
- Ɩ or Latin iota, a letter of the Latin alphabet
- Iota (Cyrillic) (Ꙇ, ꙇ), a letter of the Cyrillic alphabet used to transcribe Glagolitic Ⰺ

== Science and technology ==
- Infrared Optical Telescope Array, a former stellar interferometer array
- Integrable Optics Test Accelerator, a storage ring and test facility at Fermilab
- Iota toxin, a type of pore-forming toxin that acts to destroy the actin cytoskeleton
- SARS-CoV-2 Iota variant, a variant of SARS-CoV-2, the virus that causes COVID-19
- Imaginary unit (i), in the complex number system

=== Computing ===
- ιn, a function generating a vector of every integer from 0 to n-1 (index origin zero) in APL
- Iota and Jot, two esoteric programming languages
- IOTA (technology), a distributed ledger

== Organizations ==
- International Ovarian Tumor Analysis trial and group, founded to develop standardized terminology
- Intra-European Organisation of Tax Administrations

== Arts and entertainment ==
- Iota, a superhero in the comic book Heroes
- Colony Iota, a location in Xenoblade Chronicles 3
- Iota (singer) (Sean Hape, born 1968), Australian singer and actor
- Iota, a syndicated newspaper comic strip by Mike Keefe and Tim Menees
- Iota, 2022 album by Lous and the Yakuza

== Other uses ==
- Iota, Louisiana, a town in the US
- Iota (Italian ship), a vessel from the port of Naples, wrecked in December 1893
- Islands on the air (IOTA), a list of islands maintained by the Radio Society of Great Britain
- Hurricane Iota, a late-season Category 4 Atlantic hurricane in 2020

== See also ==
- Iota-carrageenan, a type of gelling carrageenan used in the food industry
- Iota-carrageenase, an enzyme
- Jota (disambiguation)
