= Yota (disambiguation) =

Yota is a Russian mobile broadband services provider and smartphone manufacturer.

Yota or YOTA may also refer to:

- Yōta, a masculine Japanese given name
- Yota Space, International digital art festival
- Yorta Yorta language, also spelled Yota, an extinct language once spoken by the Yorta Yorta people of Australia
- Year of the Artist, a nationwide scheme organised by the ten English Regional Arts Boards to fund residencies by artists
- A slang for a Toyota

== See also ==
- Jota (food), a stew popular in the northern Adriatic region
- Yotta-, one of the largest unit prefix in the International System of Units
