= Yōta =

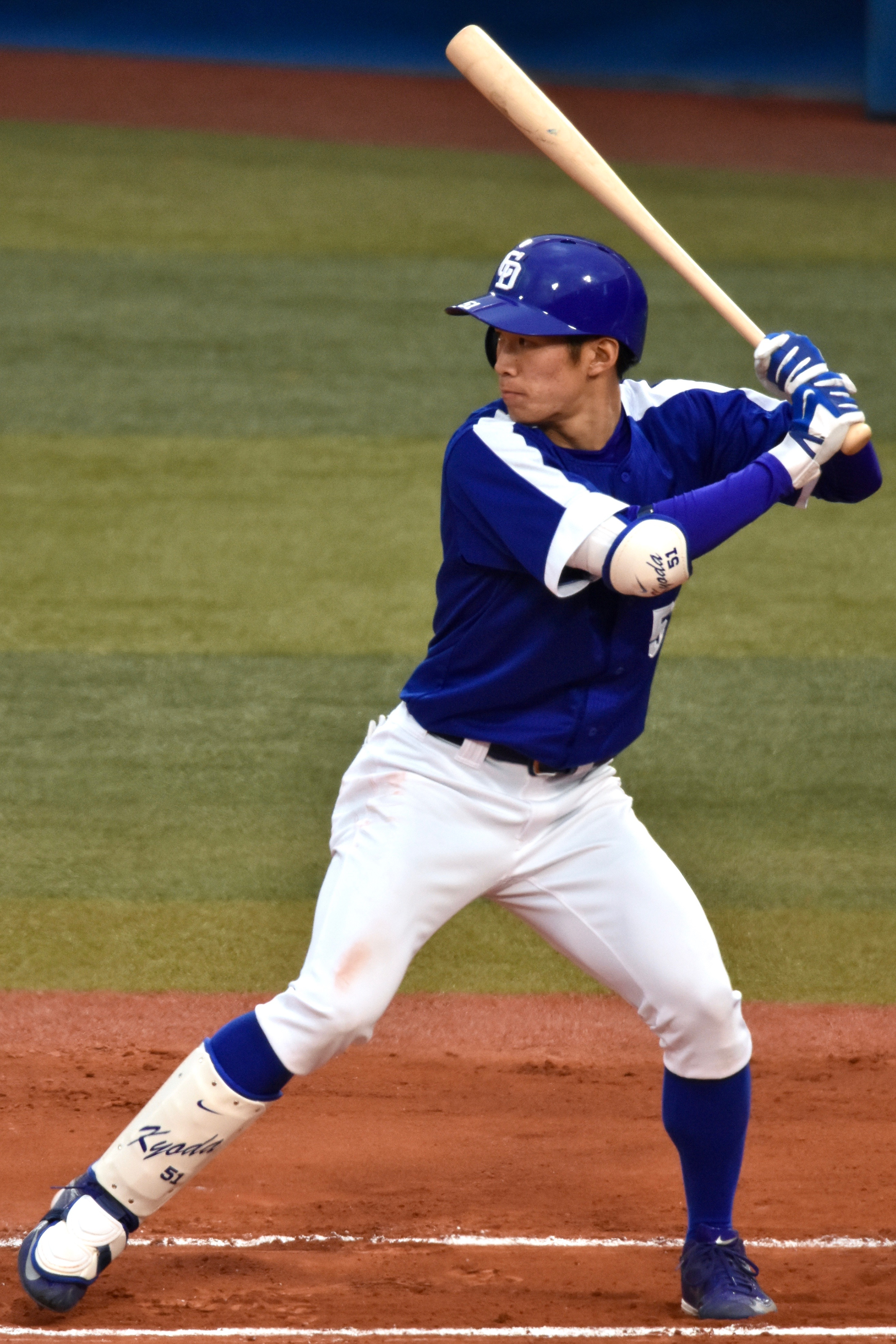
- Yota Kyoda, Japanese baseball player
- Pronunciation: joɯta (IPA)
- Gender: Male

Origin
- Origin: Japanese
- Meaning: Different meanings depending on the kanji used

Other names
- Alternative spelling: Yota (Kunrei-shiki) Yota (Nihon-shiki) Yōta, Yota, Youta (Hepburn)

Yōta, Yota or Youta is a masculine Japanese given name.

== Written forms ==
Yōta can be written using different combinations of kanji characters. Here are some examples:

- 洋太, "ocean, thick"
- 洋汰, "ocean, excessive"
- 洋多, "ocean, many"
- 陽太, "sunshine, thick"
- 陽汰, "sunshine, excessive"
- 陽多, "sunshine, many"
- 容太, "contain, thick"
- 容汰, "contain, excessive"
- 容多, "contain, many"
- 葉太, "leaf, thick"
- 葉汰, "leaf, excessive"
- 葉多, "leaf, many"
- 曜太, "weekday, thick"
- 曜汰, "weekday, excessive"
- 曜多, "weekday, many"
- 要太, "essential, thick"
- 瑶太, "precious stone, thick"
- 用汰, "utilize, excessive"
- 蓉太, "lotus, thick"
- 蓉多, "lotus, many"

The name can also be written in hiragana ようた or katakana ヨウタ.

== Notable people with the name ==
- Yota Akimoto (秋元 陽太; born 1987), Japanese footballer
- Yota Arase (荒瀬 洋太; born 1982), Japanese swimmer
- Yota Komi (小見 洋太; born 2002), Japanese footballer
- Yota Maejima (前嶋 洋太; born 1997), Japanese football player
- Yota Sato (boxer) (佐藤 洋太; born 1984), Japanese boxer
- Yota Sato (footballer) (佐藤 瑶大; born 2001), Japanese footballer
- Yota Shimokawa (下川 陽太; born 1995), Japanese football player
- Yota Tsuji (辻 陽太; born 1993), Japanese professional wrestler

== Fictional characters ==
- Yota Moteuchi (弄内 洋太), from anime and manga Video Girl Ai
