= Iota-carrageenase =

Identifiers
- EC no.: 3.2.1.157
- CAS no.: 50936-37-3

Databases
- IntEnz: IntEnz view
- BRENDA: BRENDA entry
- ExPASy: NiceZyme view
- KEGG: KEGG entry
- MetaCyc: metabolic pathway
- PRIAM: profile
- PDB structures: RCSB PDB PDBe PDBsum
Search
- PMC: articles
- PubMed: articles
- NCBI: proteins

Iota-carrageenase (EC 3.2.1.157) is an enzyme with systematic name iota-carrageenan 4-beta-D-glycanohydrolase (configuration-inverting). This enzyme catalyses the following chemical reaction

Endohydrolysis of (1->4)-beta-D-linkages between D-galactose 4-sulfate and 3,6-anhydro-D-galactose-2-sulfate in iota-carrageenans

The main products of hydrolysis are iota-neocarratetraose sulfate and iota-neocarrahexaose sulfate.
