= Jot =

Jot or JOT may refer to:

== Persons with the name ==
- Jot Agyeman (born 1967), Ghanaian actor
- Jot D. Carpenter (1938–2000), American landscape architect
- Jot Goar (1870–1947), American baseball player

== Computing ==
- Jot (programming language)
- The Journal of Object Technology
- The Joy of Tech, a webcomic
- Jot, a handwriting recognition system which became the basis for Palm OS' Graffiti 2

== Other uses ==
- Jot, or Jat, an umbrella term for the peripatetic groups of Afghanistan
- Jot (interval), a musical pitch interval
- JOT (TV series), a syndicated, animated television series
- Jot, a character from The Plucky Squire
- Jot, the Greek letter iota, in the stock phrase "not one jot or tittle"
- Joliet Regional Airport (IATA: JOT)
- Jot, a Dollar Tree private-label brand of office, school, and stationery supplies
