= Lamborghini Aventador =

Sports car produced by Lamborghini

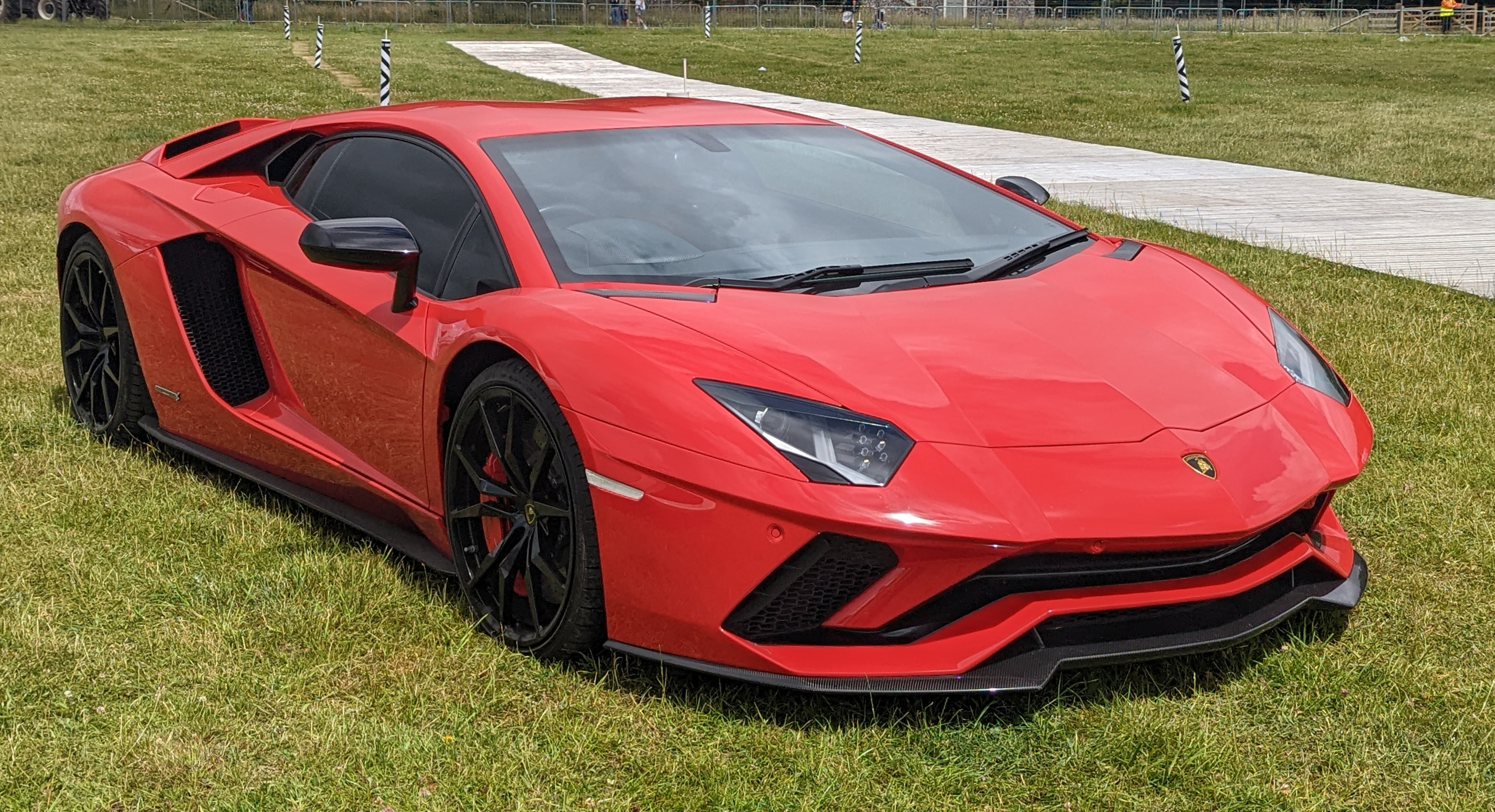
- Lamborghini Aventador S

Overview
- Manufacturer: Lamborghini
- Production: February 2011 – September 2022
- Model years: 2012–2022
- Assembly: Italy: Sant'Agata Bolognese
- Designer: Filippo Perini (original); Mitja Borkert (Aventador S)

Body and chassis
- Class: Sports car (S)
- Body style: 2-door coupé; 2-door Targa top roadster
- Layout: Mid-engine, all-wheel-drive
- Doors: Scissor
- Related: Lamborghini Veneno; Lamborghini Centenario; Lamborghini Sián FKP 37; Lamborghini Essenza SCV12; Lamborghini Countach LPI 800-4

Powertrain
- Engine: 6.5 L L539 V12
- Power output: 515 kW (700 PS; 690 hp) (Aventador); 545 kW (740 PS; 730 hp) (Aventador S); 550 kW (750 PS; 740 hp) (Aventador SV); 565 kW (770 PS; 760 hp) (Aventador SVJ); 575 kW (780 PS; 770 hp) (Aventador Ultimae)
- Transmission: 7-speed Graziano ISR automated manual

Dimensions
- Wheelbase: 2,700 mm (106.3 in)
- Length: 4,780 mm (188.2 in)
- Width: 2,030 mm (79.9 in) (with mirrors: 2,265 mm (89.2 in))
- Height: 1,136 mm (44.7 in)
- Curb weight: 1,575 kg (3,472 lb) LP 700-4, LP 740-4 S (dry); 1,731 kg (3,816 lb) LP 700-4 (with fluids, Eur); 1,853 kg (4,085 lb) LP 700-4 (with fluids, US); 1,769 kg (3,900 lb) LP 750-4 SV (with fluids, US); 1,819 kg (4,010 lb) LP 750-4 SV Roadster (with fluids, US); 1,525 kg (3,362 lb) LP 750-4 SV, SVJ LP 770-4 (dry); 1,770 kg (3,902 lb) SVJ LP 770-4 (with fluids, US)

Chronology
- Predecessor: Lamborghini Murciélago
- Successor: Lamborghini Revuelto

Lamborghini Aventador LP 700-4 at the 2011 Goodwood Festival of speed

The Lamborghini Aventador (Spanish pronunciation: [aβentaˈðoɾ]) is a mid-engine, two-seater sports car manufactured and marketed by Lamborghini from 2011 until 2022. Named after a prominent Spanish fighting bull that fought in Zaragoza, Aragón, in 1993, the Aventador succeeded the Murciélago and was manufactured in Sant'Agata Bolognese, Italy.

== History ==
The Aventador was launched on 28 February 2011 at the Geneva Motor Show, five months after its initial unveiling in Sant'Agata Bolognese. Internally codenamed LB834, it was designed to replace the then-decade-old Murciélago as the new flagship model.

Soon after its unveiling, Lamborghini announced that it had sold 12 cars, with deliveries starting in the second half of 2011. By March 2016, Lamborghini had built 5,000 Aventadors. At the time, it was the second-best selling Lamborghini model ever.

The Aventador was replaced by the Revuelto in 2023.

== Specifications and performance ==
=== Specifications ===
==== Engine ====
The Aventador LP 700–4 used Lamborghini's 700 PS (515 kW; 690 hp) 6,498 cc (6.5 L; 396.5 cu in) 60° V12 engine, weighing about 235 kg (518 lb). Known internally as the L539, it was Lamborghini's fifth in-house engine and second V12 design since the 3.5-litre power plant found in the 350GT.

Displacement	6,498 cc (396.5 cu in)
Max. power	700 PS (515 kW; 690 hp) at 8,250 rpm
Min. power to weight	378 PS (278 kW; 373 bhp) per tonne
Max. torque	690 N⋅m (509 lb⋅ft) at 5,500 rpm
Firing order	1, 12, 4, 9, 2, 11, 6, 7, 3, 10, 5, 8
CO_{2} emissions	398 g/km (23 oz/mi)
Combined fuel consumption	17.2 L/100 km (16.4 mpg_{‑imp}; 13.7 mpg_{‑US})

Powertrains
Models	Engine & Displacement	Drive type	Max. Power	Max. Torque	Kerb Weight	Top Speed	0–100 km/h (0-62 mph)
LP 700-4 Roadster	6.5 L (6,498 cc); L539 V12	All-wheel drive	515 kW (691 bhp)	689 N·m (508 lb·ft)	1,625 kg. (3,583 lb.)	350 km/h (217 mph)	2.9 seconds
LP 700–4	6.5 L (6,498 cc); L539 V12	All-wheel drive	515 kW (691 bhp)	689 N·m (508 lb·ft)	1,575 kg (3,472 lb)	350 km/h (217 mph)	2.9 seconds
SuperVeloce LP 750-4 Roadster	6.5 L (6,498 cc); L539 V12	All-wheel drive	552 kW (740 bhp)	689 N·m (508 lb·ft)	1,575 kg. (3,472 lb.)	350 km/h (217 mph)	2.8 seconds
SuperVeloce LP 750–4	6.5 L (6,498 cc); L539 V12	All-wheel drive	552 kW (740 bhp)	689 N·m (508 lb·ft)	1,853 kg. (4,085 lb.)	350 km/h (217 mph)	2.8 seconds
S LP 740–4	6.5 L (6,498 cc); L539 V12	All-wheel drive	545 kW (730 bhp)	690 N·m (509 lb·ft)	1,575 kg. (3,472 lb.)	350 km/h (217 mph)	2.9 seconds
S Roadster	6.5 L (6,498 cc); L539 V12	All-wheel drive	545 kW (730 bhp)	690 N·m (509 lb·ft)	1,623 kg. (3,582 lb.)	350 km/h (217 mph)	3.2 seconds
SVJ LP 770–4	6.5 L (6,498 cc); L539 V12	All-wheel drive	566 kW (759 bhp)	720 N·m (531 lb·ft)	1525–1575 kg. (3362-3472 lb.)	350 km/h (217 mph)	2.8 seconds
SVJ Roadster	6.5 L (6,498 cc); L539 V12	All-wheel drive	566 kW (759 bhp)	720 N·m (531 lb·ft)	1525–1575 kg. (3362-3472 lb.)	350 km/h (217 mph)	2.8 seconds
LP 780-4 Ultimae	6.5 L (6,498 cc); L539 V12	All-wheel drive	573 kW (769 bhp)	720 N·m (531 lb·ft)	1550 kg. (3417 lb.)	354 km/h (220 mph)	*2.84 seconds

=== Performance ===
- 0–100 km/h (0–62 mph): 2.9 seconds
- 0–161 km/h (0–100 mph): 6.4 seconds
- 400 m (1/4 mi): 10.5 seconds at 220 km/h (137 mph)
- Top speed:
  - Official: 350 km/h (217 mph)
  - Measured by Sport Auto magazine: 354 km/h (220 mph)
- 97–0 km/h (60–0 mph): 30 m (100 ft)
- Cornering – 1.05 g.

The seven-speed single-clutch automated manual transmission, was built by Graziano Trasmissioni.

The new, electronically controlled, all-wheel drive system was developed and supplied by the Swedish company Haldex Traction.

== Models ==
=== Aventador LP 700-4 (2011–2016) ===
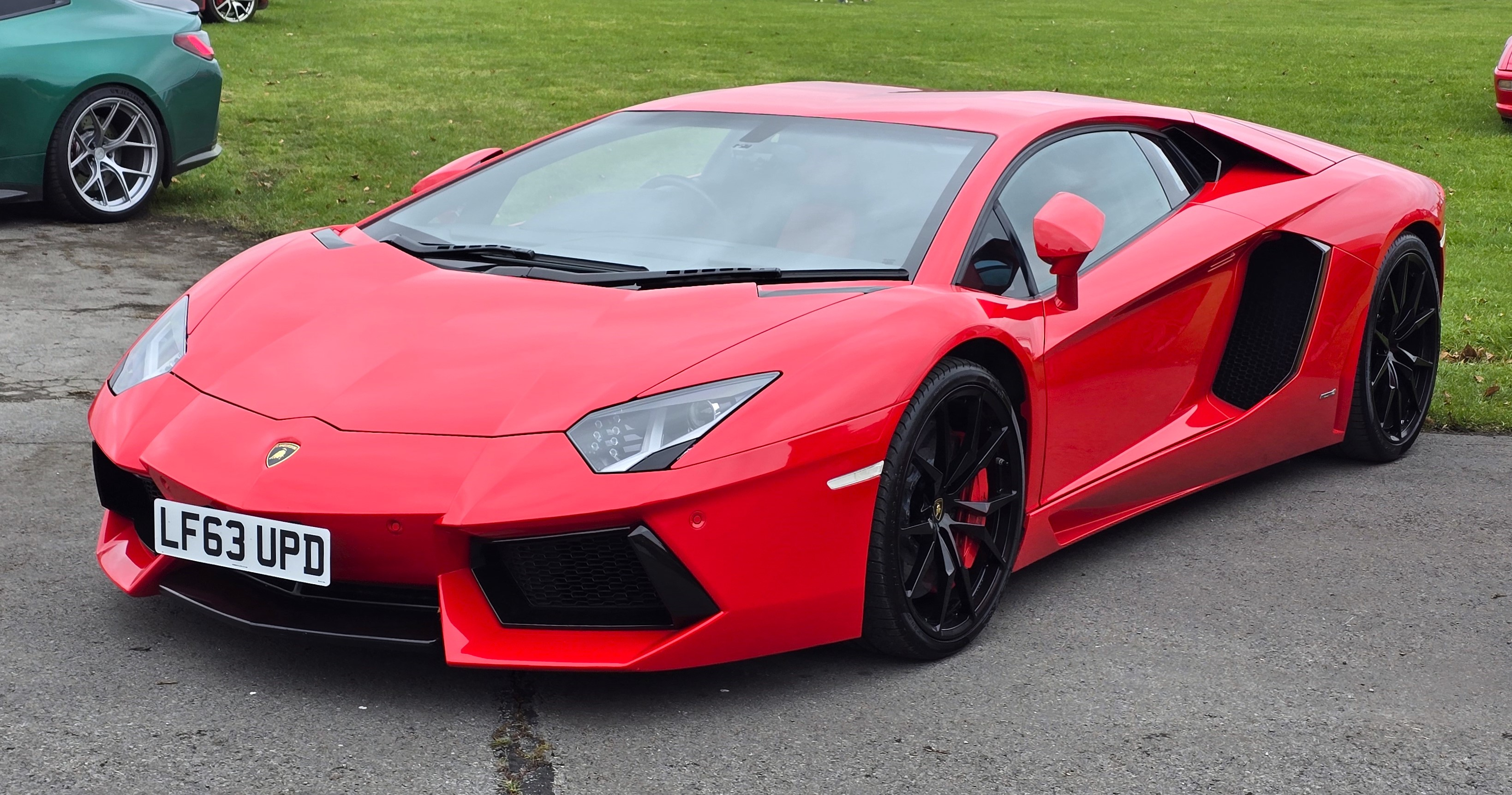
Aventador LP 700-4

The Aventador LP 700-4 was the first iteration of the Aventador and was designed by Filippo Perini. Production of the Aventador was planned to be limited to 4,000 vehicles; however, in 2016, it achieved the 5,000 unit milestone. The moulds used to make the carbon fibre monocoque were expected to last 500 moulds each, and only 8 were made.

=== Aventador LP 700-4 Roadster (2013–2016) ===
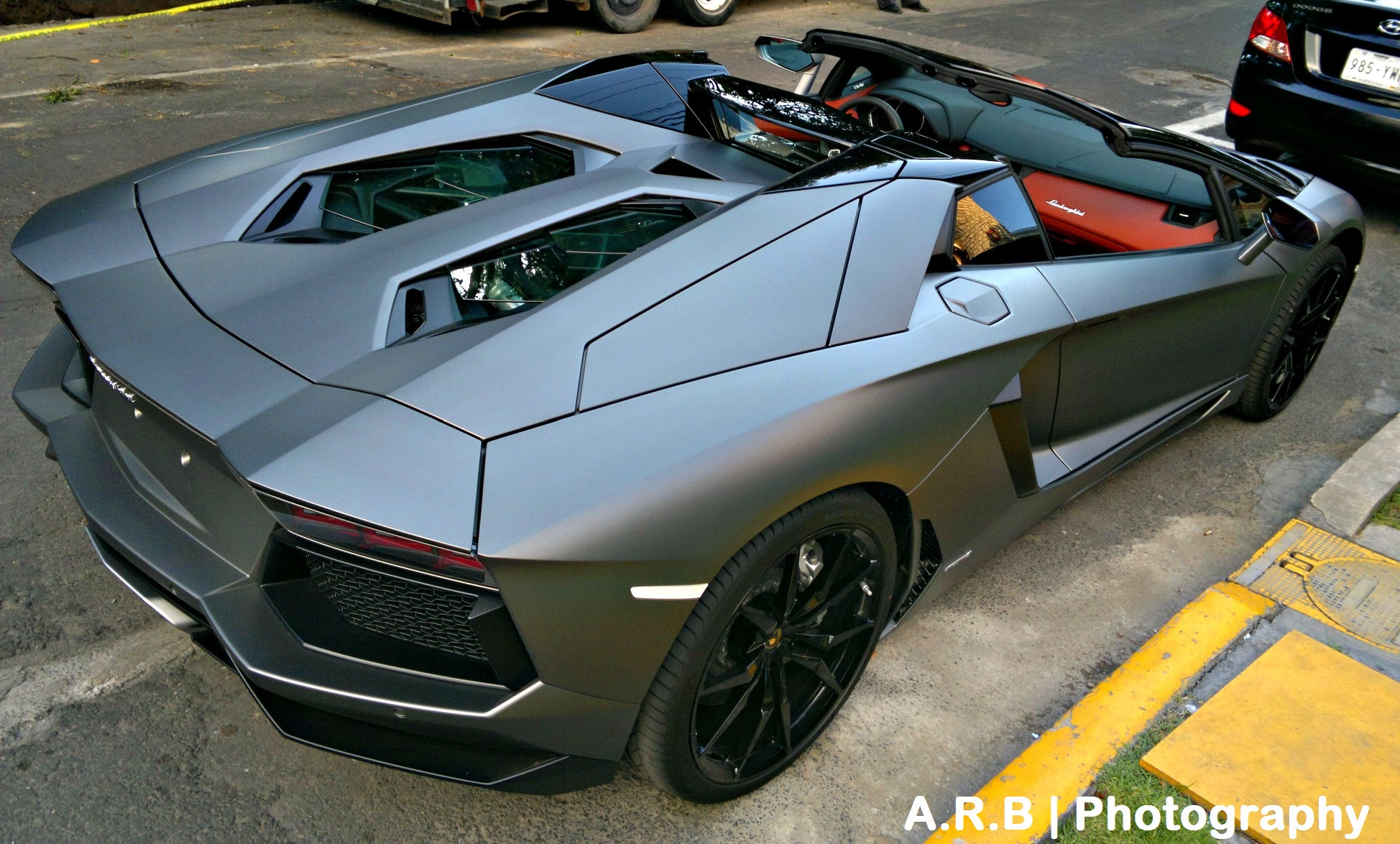
Aventador LP 700-4 Roadster

The Roadster model was announced for production on 27 December 2012. Equipped with the same V12 engine as the coupé, Lamborghini claimed that it could accelerate from 0–97 km/h (0–60 mph) in 2.9 seconds and would achieve a top speed of 349 km/h (217 mph).

The removable roof consisted of two carbon fibre panels weighing 6 kg (13 lb) each, which required the reinforcement of the rear pillar to compensate for the loss of structural integrity and accommodate the rollover protection and ventilation systems for the engine. The panels were removable and could be stored in the front luggage compartment. The Aventador Roadster had a unique engine cover design and an attachable wind deflector to improve cabin airflow at super high speeds and a gloss black finish on the A-pillars, windshield header, roof panels, and rear window area. With a total weight of 1,625 kg (3,583 lb) it was only 50 kg (110 lb) heavier than the coupé (the weight of the roof, plus additional stiffening in the sills and A-pillars).

=== Aventador SuperVeloce LP 750-4 (2015–2017) ===
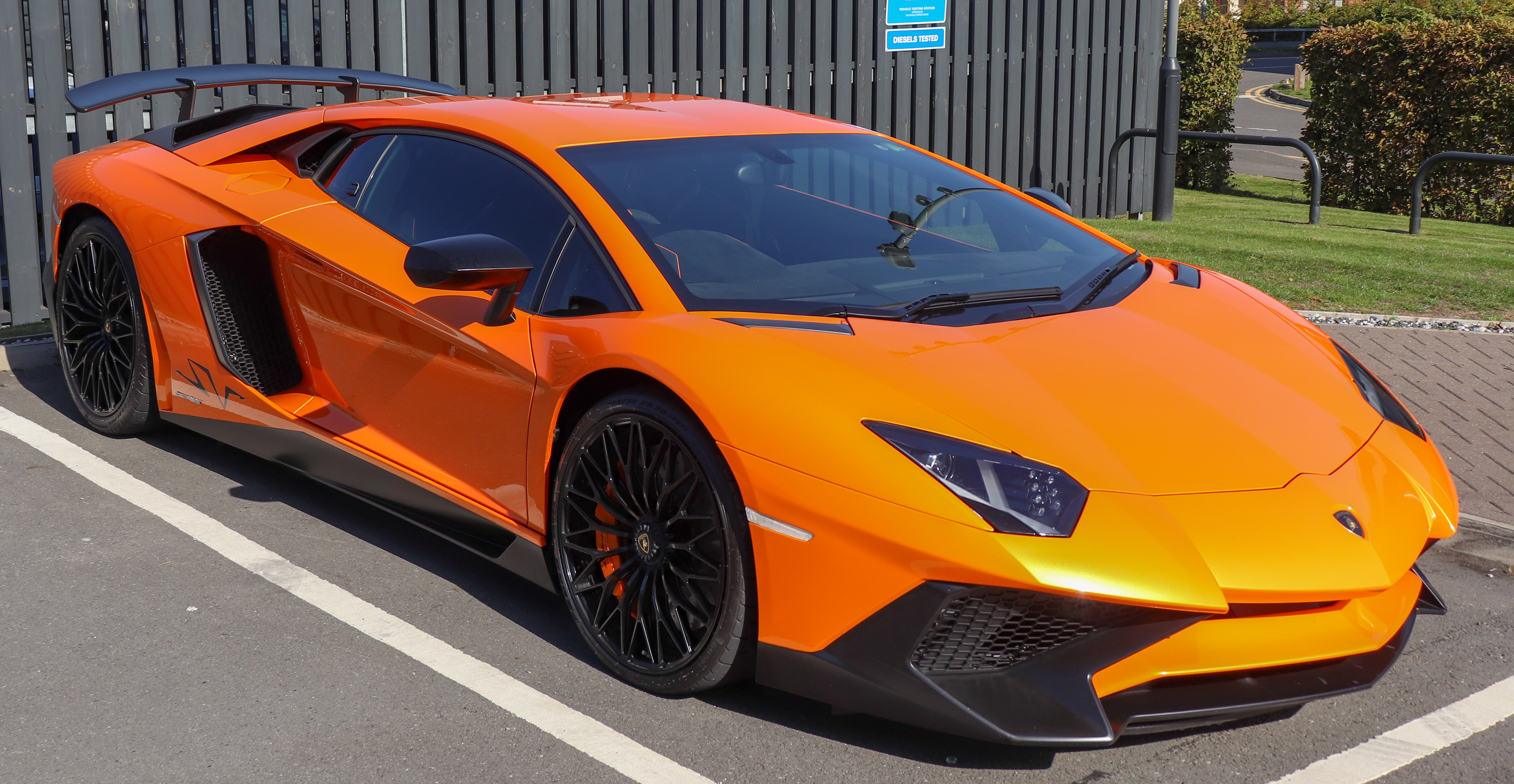
2015 Aventador SV

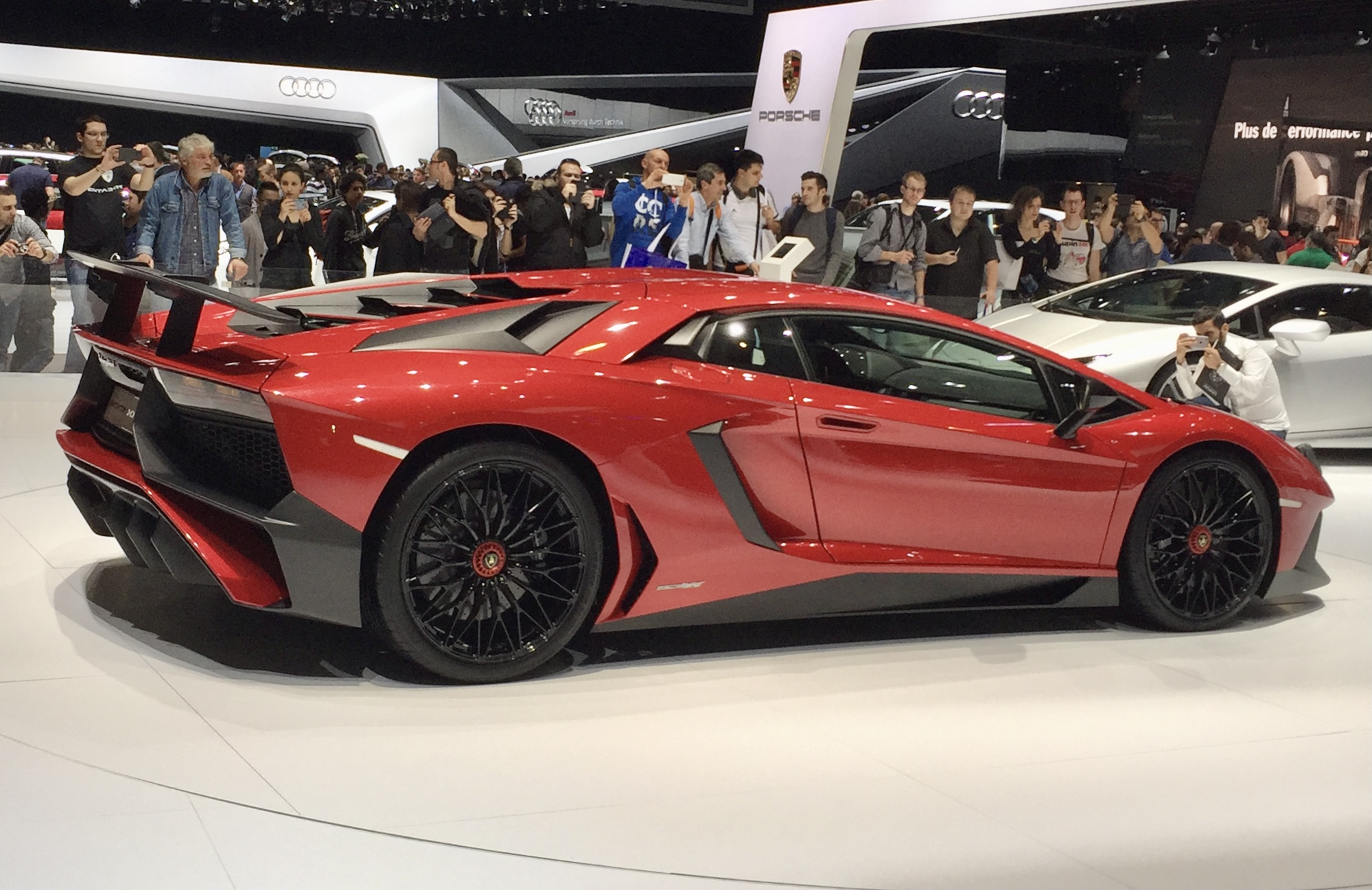
Rear view

The SuperVeloce (SV) (Italian pronunciation: [ˌsuperveˈloːtʃe]) was announced at the 2015 Geneva Motor Show. It featured an upgraded powertrain, with maximum power output increased to 750 PS (552 kW; 740 hp) from the standard coupé's 700 PS (515 kW; 690 hp). Combined with a weight reduction of 50 kg (110 lb) from increased usage of carbon fibre both inside and out, the SV had a power-to-weight ratio of 1 hp to 2 kg. It also featured improved aerodynamics, with downforce increased by 180% as compared to the standard coupé. Notable aerodynamic upgrades were a revised front splitter and rear diffuser, along with a fixed CFRP rear wing. Driving dynamics were enhanced with electronic steering, magnetic push-rod suspension, and chassis improvements to increase rigidity. Overall, the SV's 0–100 km/h (0–62 mph) acceleration time decreased from 2.9 seconds to 2.8 seconds, with the theoretical top speed still "somewhere in excess" of 350 km/h (217 mph). Delivery of the car began in the second quarter of 2015 with production limited to 600 units. Road & Track recorded a 0–241 km/h (0–150 mph) time of 12.8 seconds, a 0–322 km/h (0–200 mph) time of 33.5 seconds, and a 0–1/4 mile (402 m) at the top speed of 227.4 km/h (141.3 mph) 0–322 km/h (0–200 mph) shootout.

Production ended in July 2017, with the last car finished in a bespoke liquid metallic silver.

=== Aventador SuperVeloce LP 750-4 Roadster (2016–2017) ===
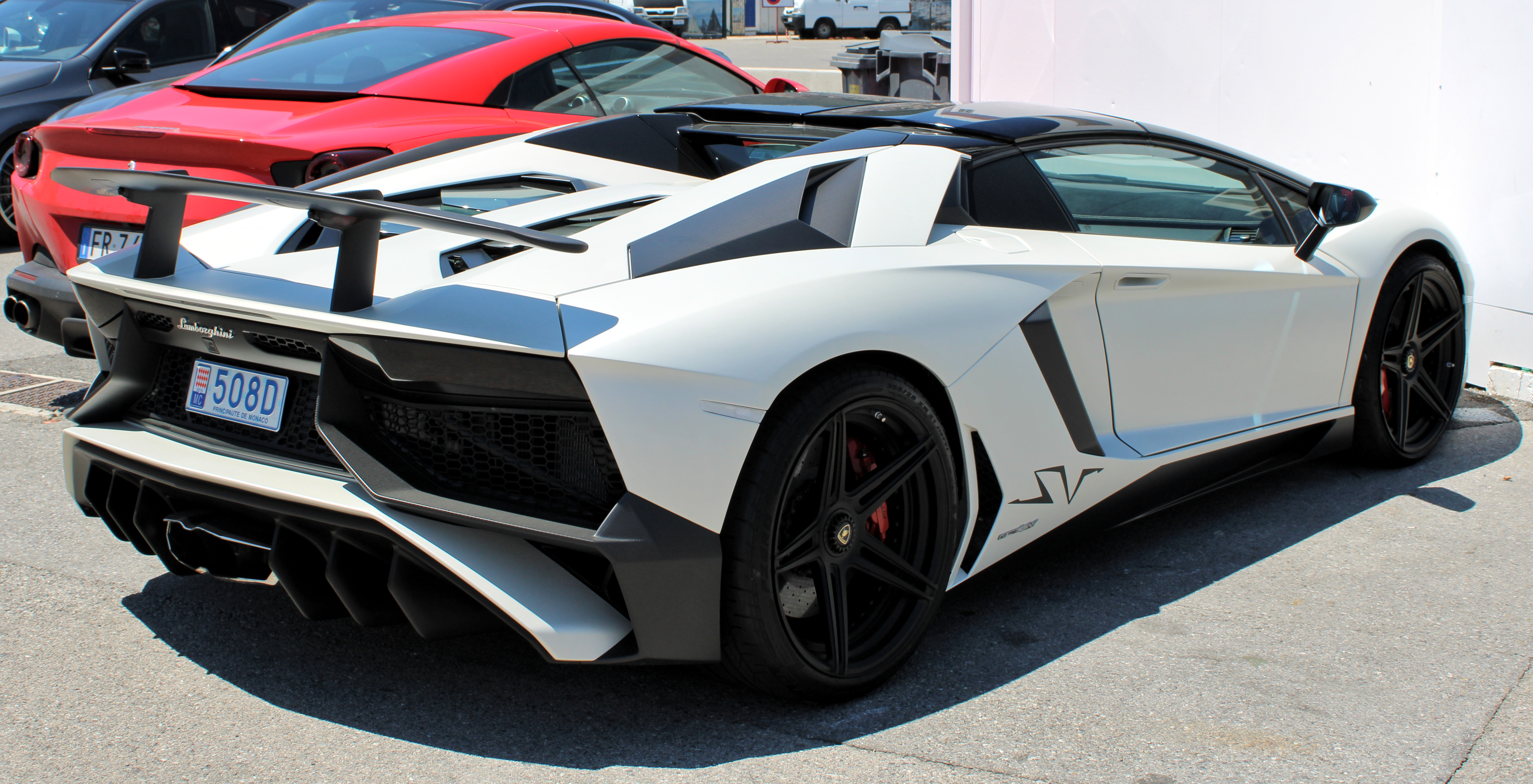
Aventador SV Roadster

The SuperVeloce Roadster was unveiled at the 2015 Pebble Beach Concours d'Elegance. It featured a compact two-piece carbon fibre hardtop that could be stored in the trunk like the standard roadster. Weight-saving measures lowered the weight to 1,575 kg (3,472 lb), making it 50 kg (110 lb) lighter than the standard roadster. Deliveries began in the first quarter of 2016 and production was limited to 500 units.

=== Aventador S LP 740-4 (2016–2021) ===
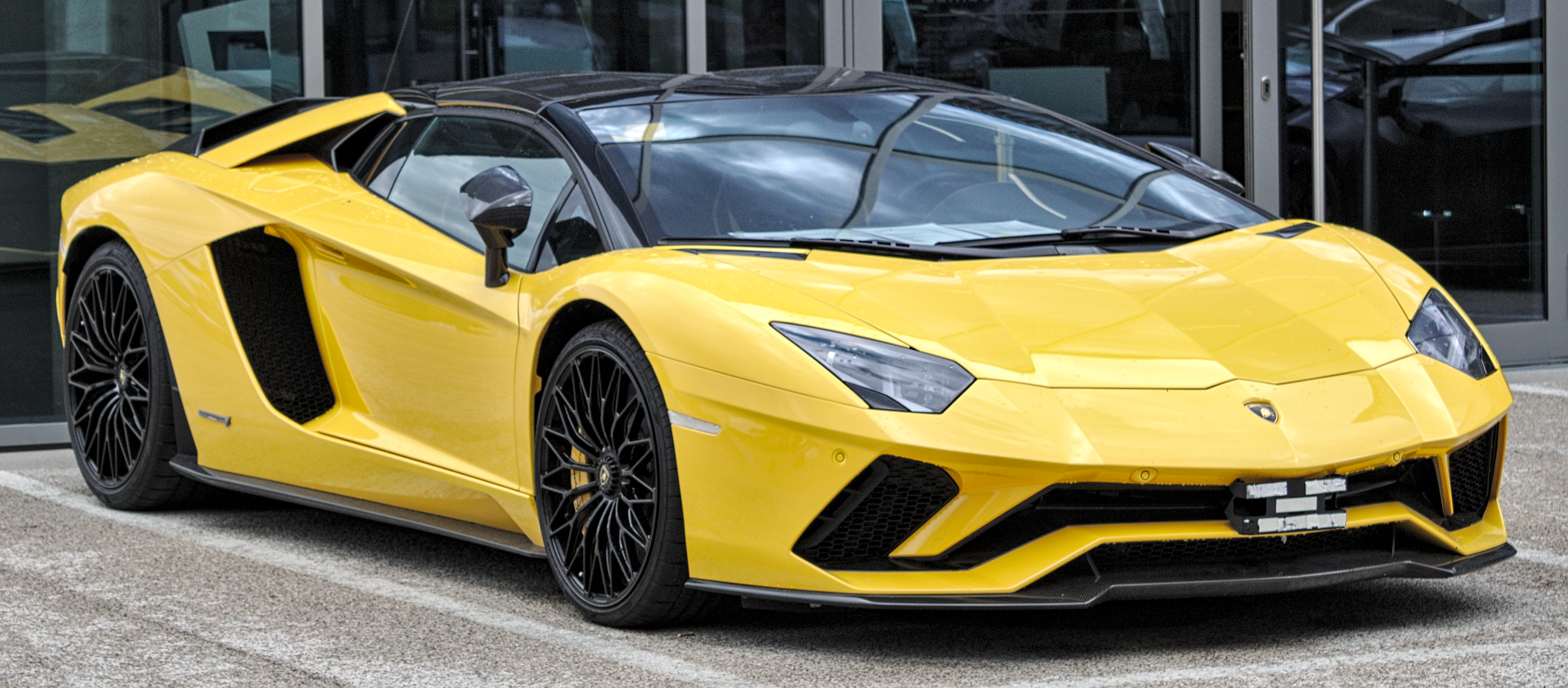
Aventador S

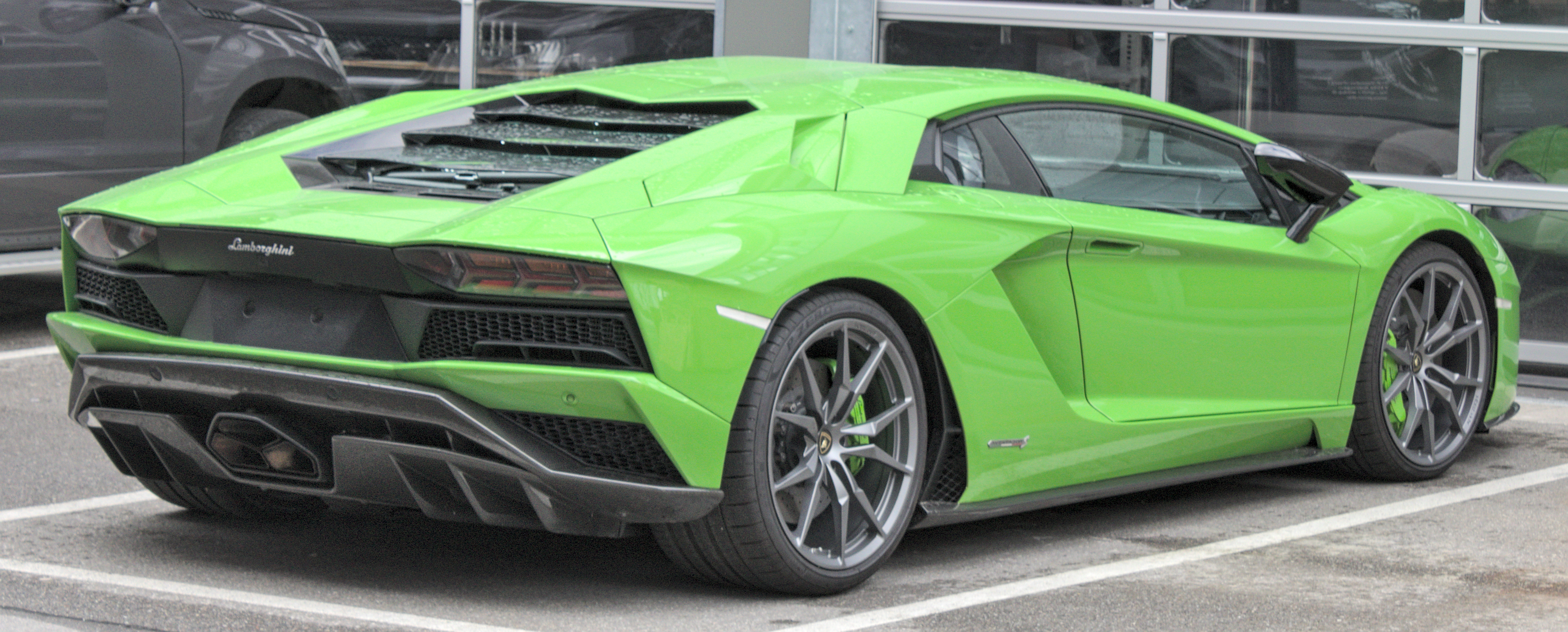
Aventador S rear view

Unveiled on 19 December 2016 at the Sant'Agata factory, official reveal took place at the March 2017 Geneva Motor Show. The S was an update to the base Aventador with mechanical (including four-wheeled-steering), and exterior changes. The updated exterior was designed by head of design Mitja Borkert. The 6.5 litre V12 engine was rated at 740 PS (544 kW; 730 hp) at 8,400 rpm (40 PS (39 hp; 29 kW), more than the original Aventador), and 690 N⋅m (509 lb⋅ft) of torque at 5,500 rpm. It could accelerate from 0 to 97 km/h (0 to 60 mph) in 2.9 seconds with a top speed of 217 mph (350.0 km/h).

The S came with four-wheel steering, permanent four-wheel-drive and updated suspension. Suspension was controlled by the 'Lamborghini Dinamica Veicolo Attiva' (LDVA) control unit with four selectable modes – Sport, Strada (Street), Corsa (Track) and Ego (i.e. individual). Carbon ceramic brakes were standard (front: 400 mm, rear: 380 mm). The nose was redesigned with a bigger front splitter and two new air ducts in the front bumper. At the rear, it had a new black rear diffuser with fins and three single exit exhaust tips. It had 130 percent more front downforce than the original Aventador.

=== Aventador S Roadster (2017–2021) ===
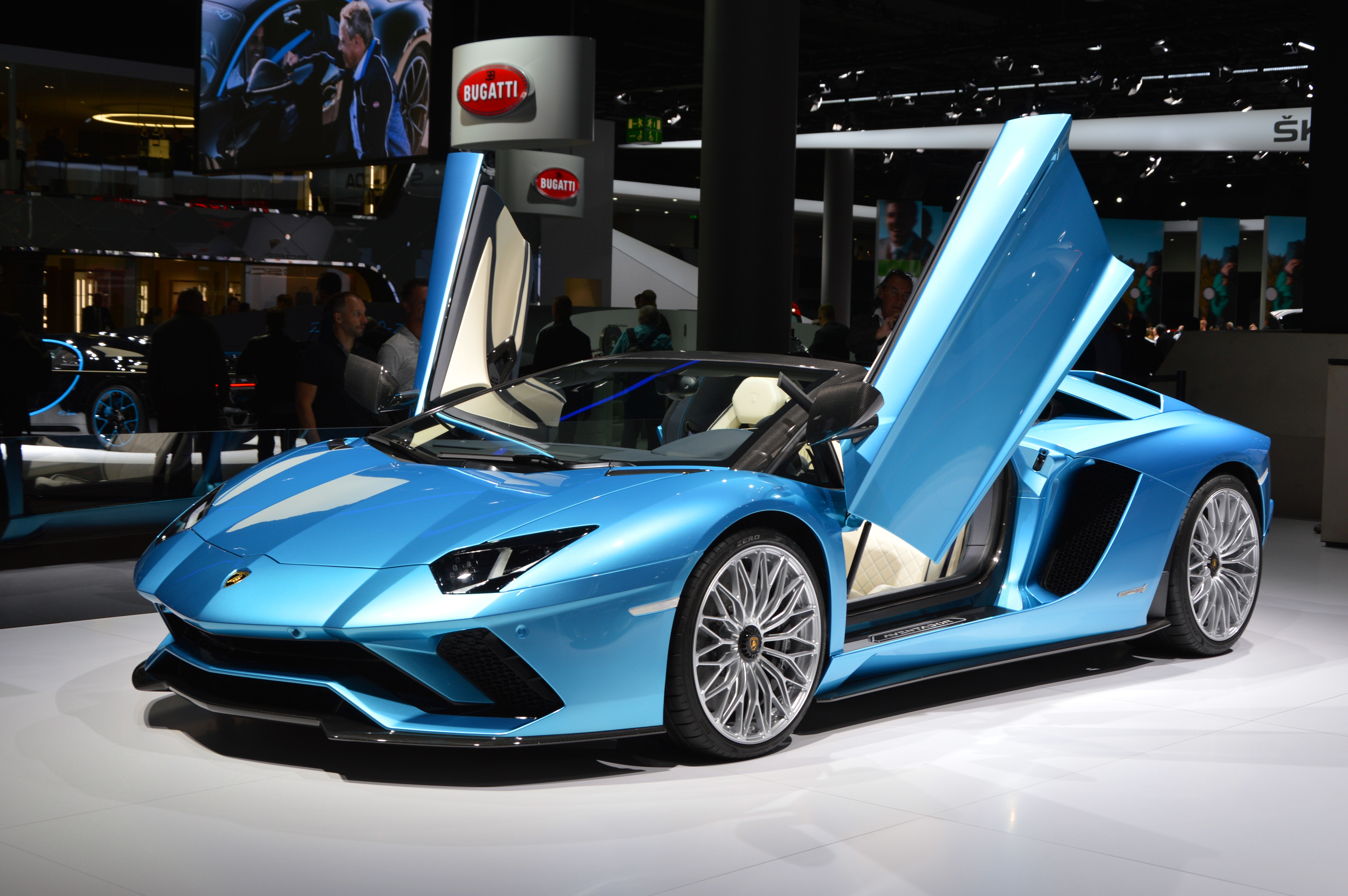
Aventador S Roadster at the 2017 Frankfurt Motor Show

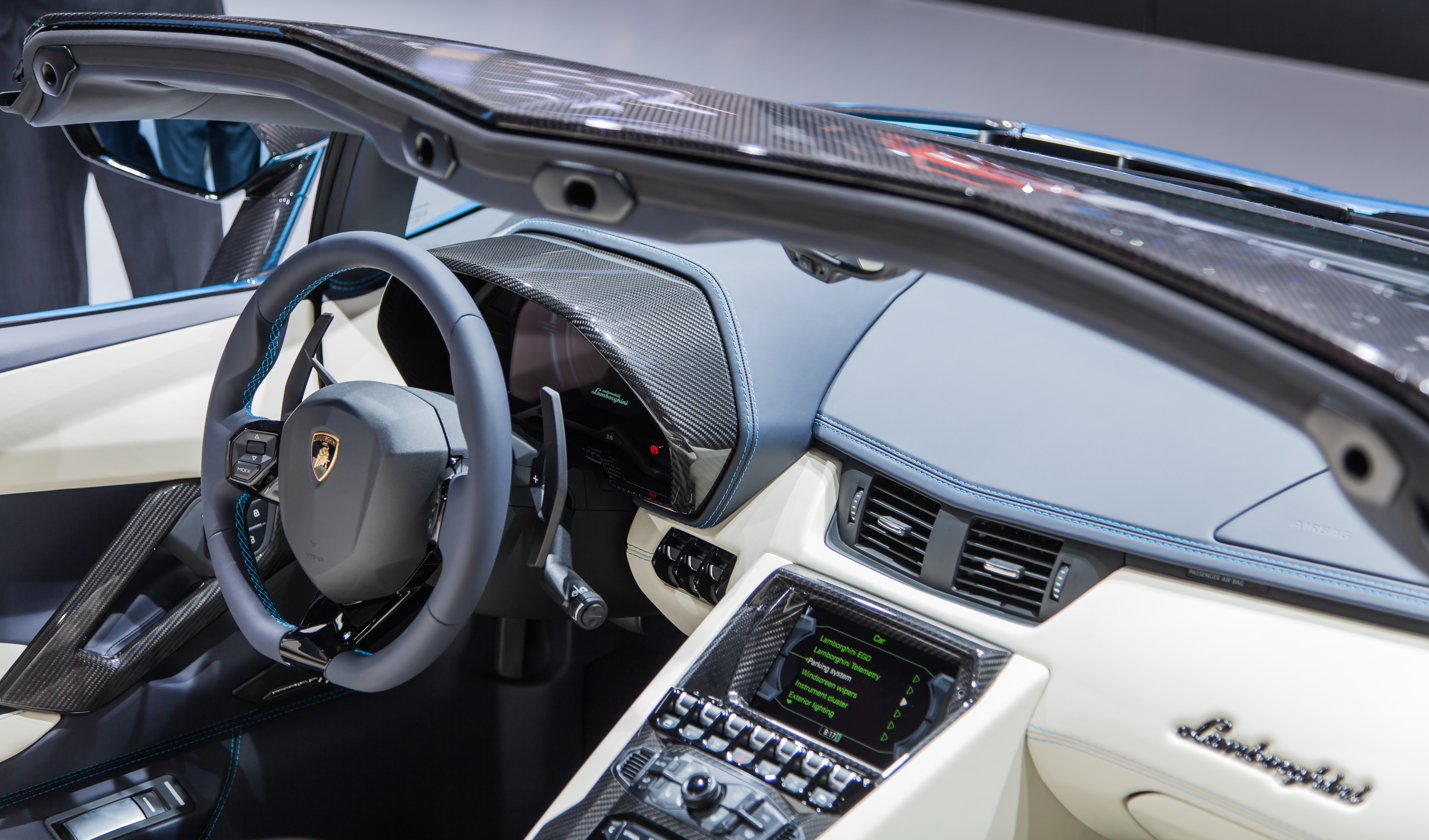
Interior

The roadster variant of the S model followed in 2017 at the Frankfurt International Motor Show. It was mechanically identical to the coupé with the only difference being the engine cover (identical to the standard Aventador roadster), two carbon fibre removable roof panels (weighing less than 6 kg (13 lb) stow-able in the front compartment), and new optional wheels. It was 50 kg (110 lb) heavier than the coupé due to chassis reinforcing components. Acceleration from 0–60 mph (0–97 km/h) in 3.2 seconds was 0.3 seconds slower than the coupe.

=== Aventador SVJ LP 770-4 (2018–2021) ===
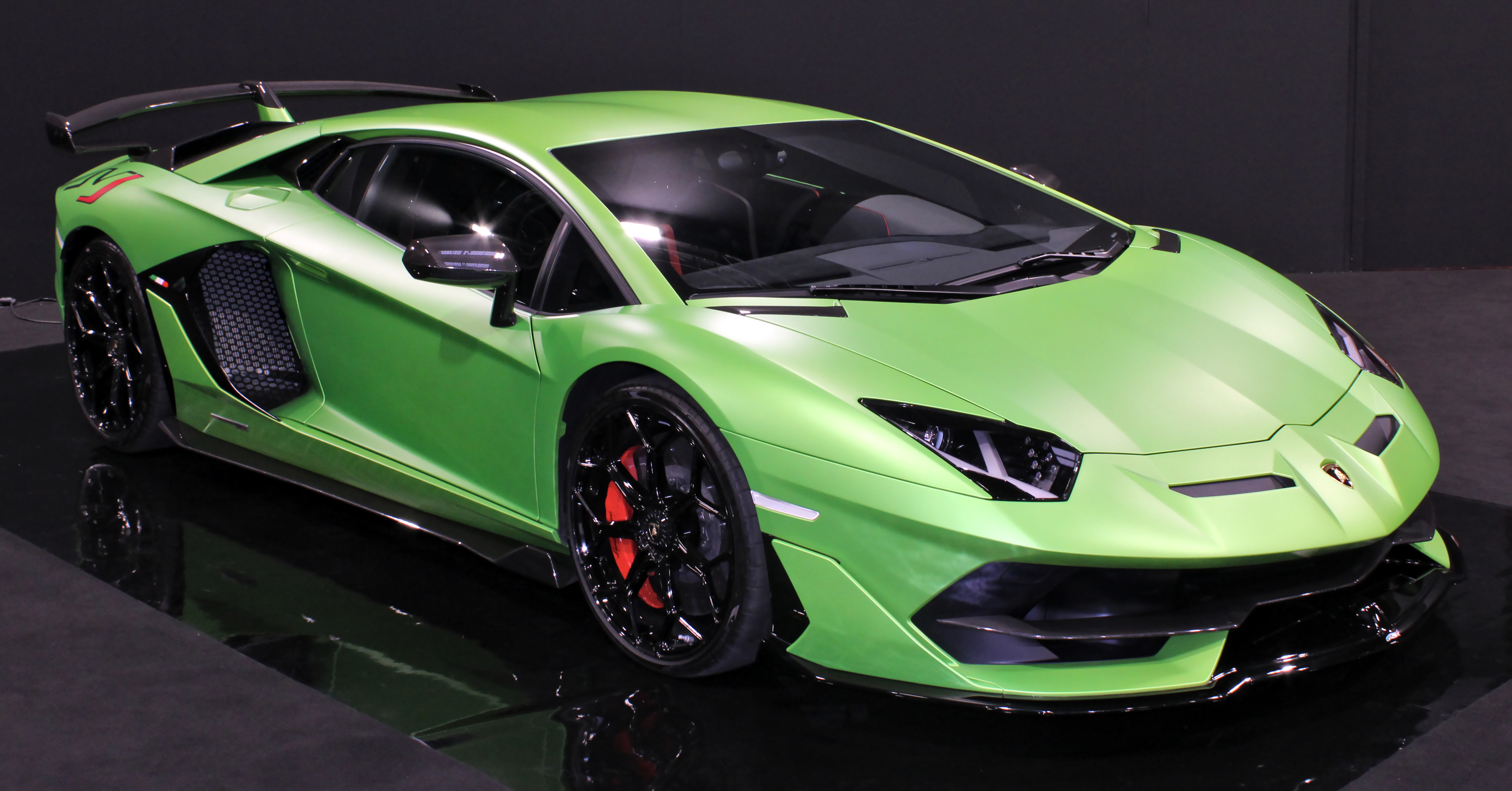
Aventador SVJ at the 2018 Paris Motor Show

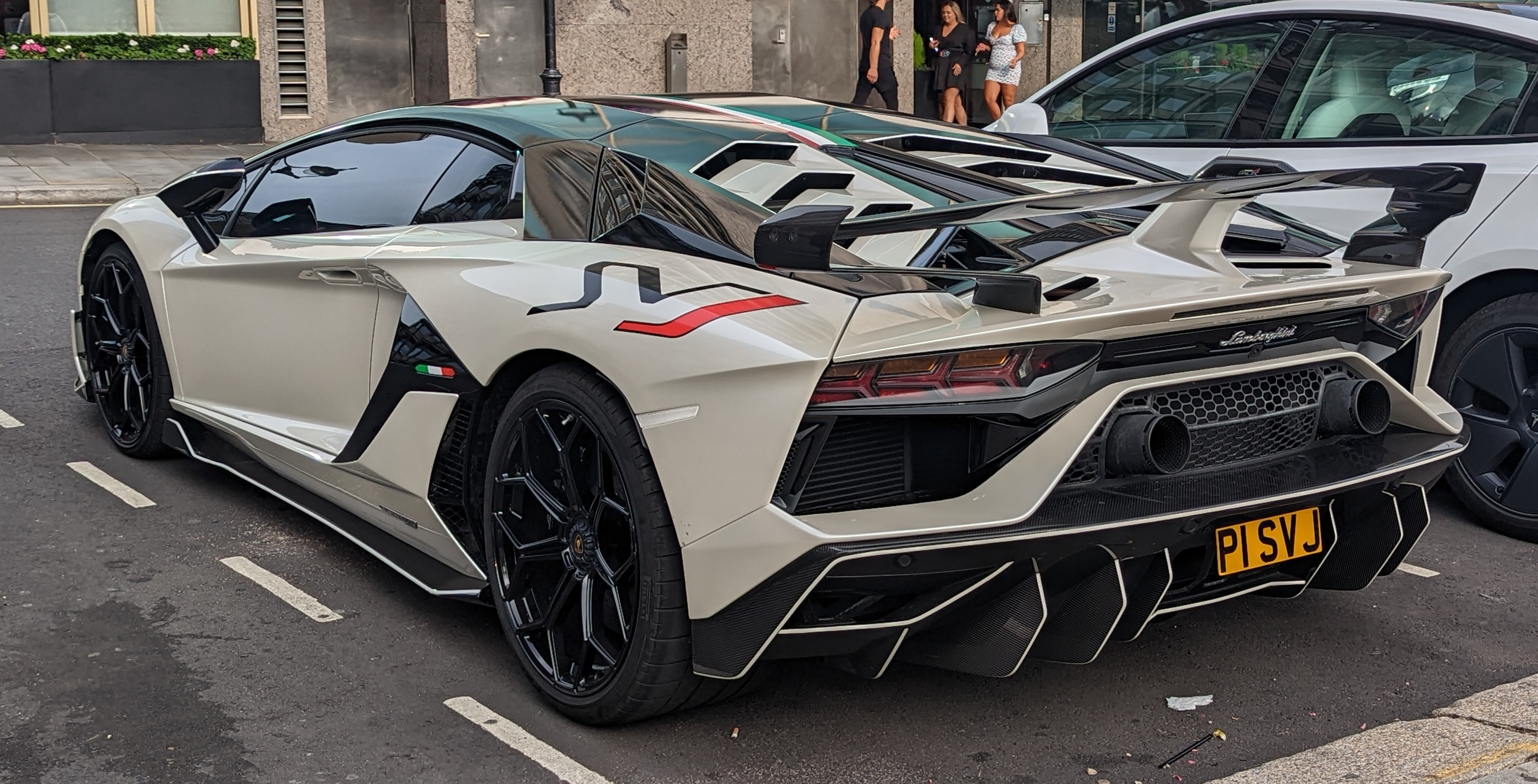
Aventador SVJ rear view

Unveiled at the 2018 Pebble Beach Concours d'Elegance, the SVJ (Super Veloce Jota) is a track-focused iteration of the S and an improvement over the SV, with 900 units produced. The 6.5-litre L539 V12 engine used in the entire Aventador lineage was reworked and to generate a maximum power output of 770 PS (566 kW; 759 hp) at 8,500 rpm and 720 N⋅m (531 lb⋅ft) of torque at 6,750 rpm. Measures such as extensive use of carbon fibre, and titanium in the exhaust system brought the weight down to 1,525 kg (3,362 lb), giving the car a power-to-weight ratio of 0.5 hp/kg. The SVJ could accelerate from 0–100 km/h (0–62 mph) in 2.8 seconds and 0–200 km/h (0–124 mph) in 8.6 seconds with a top speed of 217 mph (350.0 km/h).

A camouflaged SVJ prototype driven by Lamborghini test driver Marco Mapelli set a new production car lap time of 6:44.97 around the Nürburgring Nordschleife in July 2018, beating the previous record-holder, the Porsche 911 GT2 RS.

The SVJ was the first production V12 Lamborghini model to feature the Aerodinamica Lamborghini Attiva (ALA) system adding aerodynamic components including a disconnected front splitter, tri-dimensional air outlet on the bonnet, large carbon fibre rear wing with central fin, underbody vortex generators, and a large rear diffuser. The system worked in conjunction with the Lamborghini Dinamica Veicolo Attiva 2.0 (LDVA 2.0) management system, which uses inertial sensors to control the car's configuration every 0.5 seconds, and claims to allow the car to achieve 40% more downforce than the SV and 1% reduction in the drag coefficient.

=== Aventador SVJ Roadster (2019–2021) ===
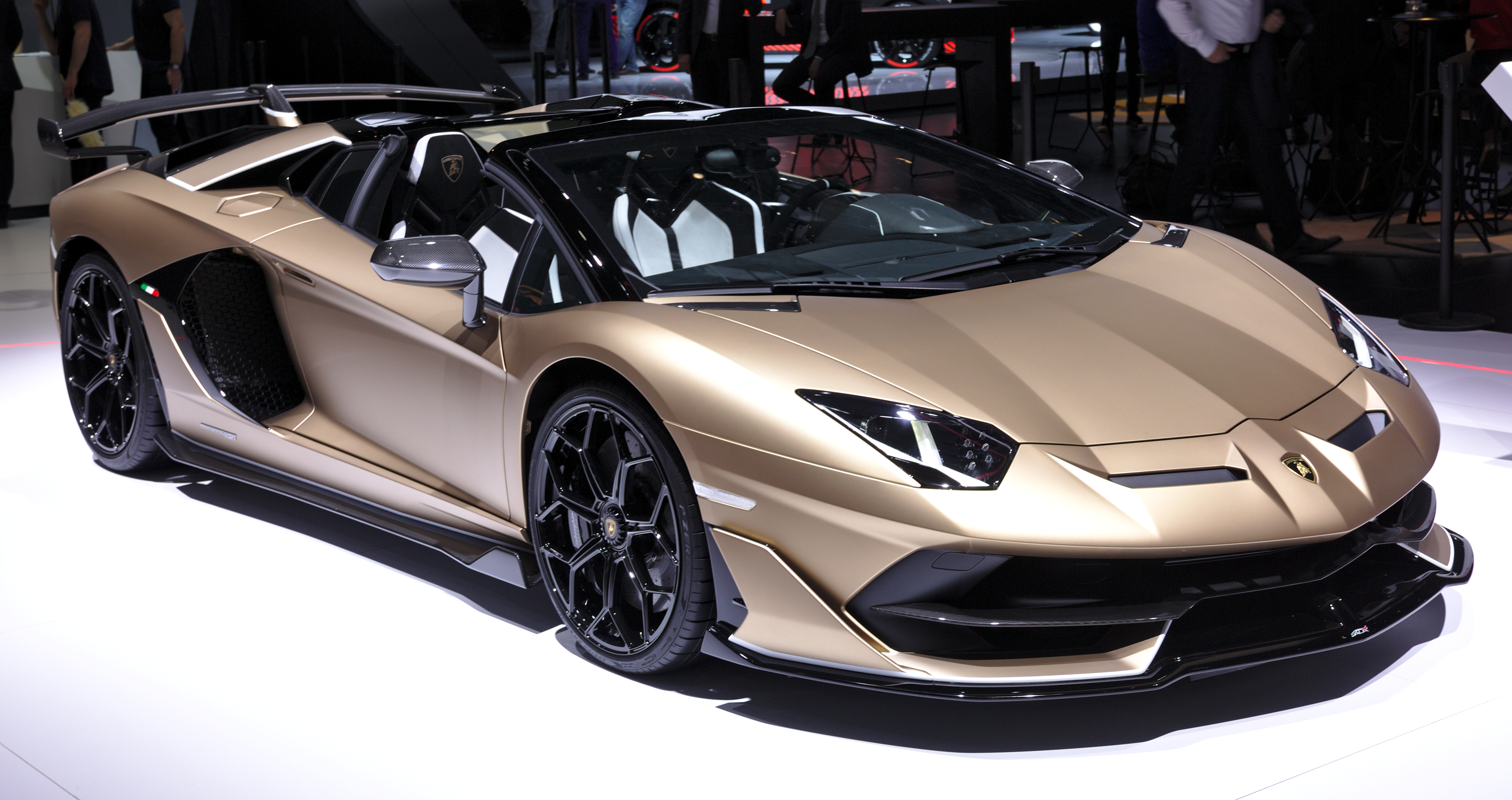
Aventador SVJ Roadster

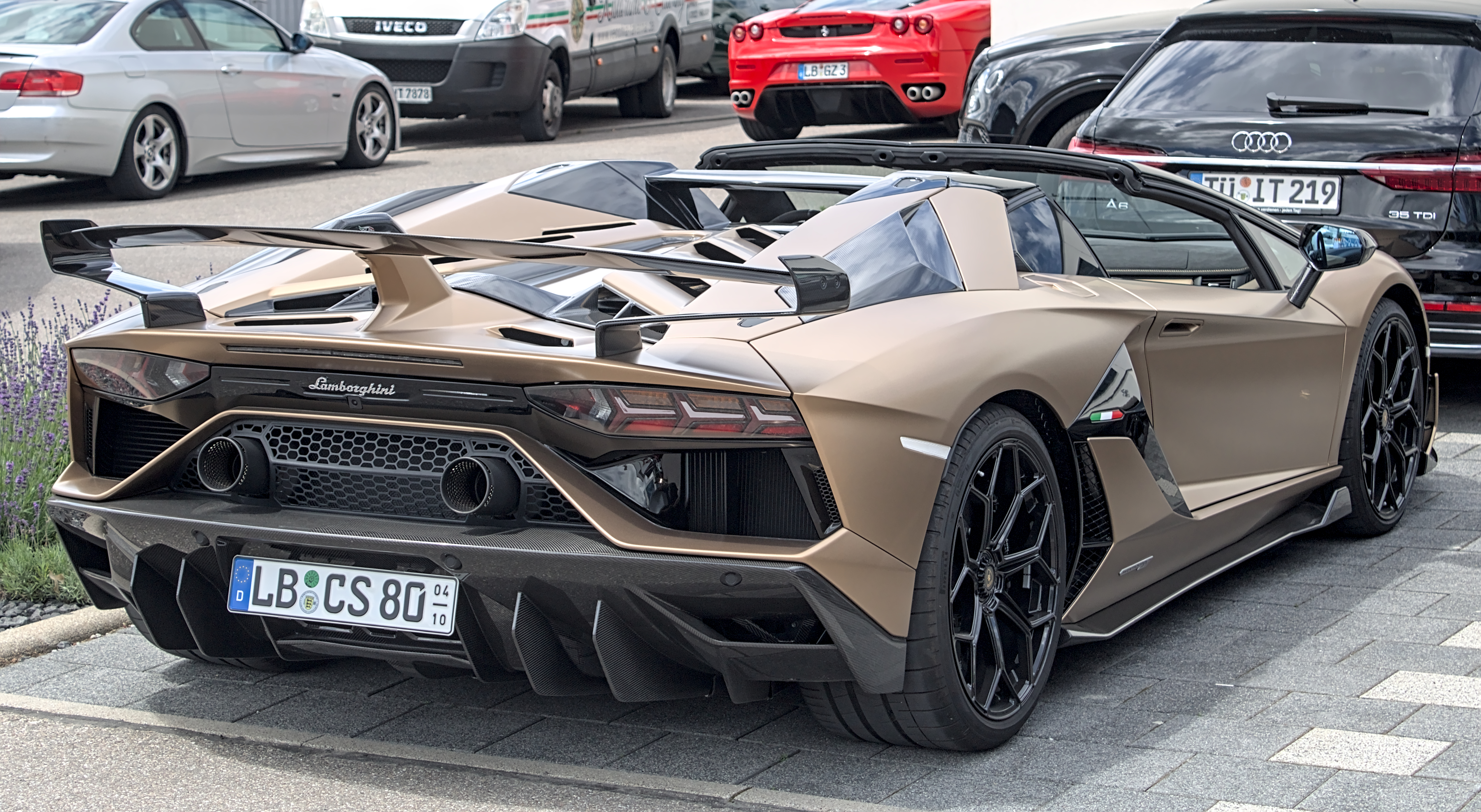

The roadster variant of the SVJ was unveiled at the 2019 Geneva Motor Show. 800 units of the SVJ Roadster were produced. It had a removable two-piece carbon-fibre hard top and retained the coupé powertrain with the same performance figures.

=== Aventador LP 780-4 Ultimae (2021–2022) ===
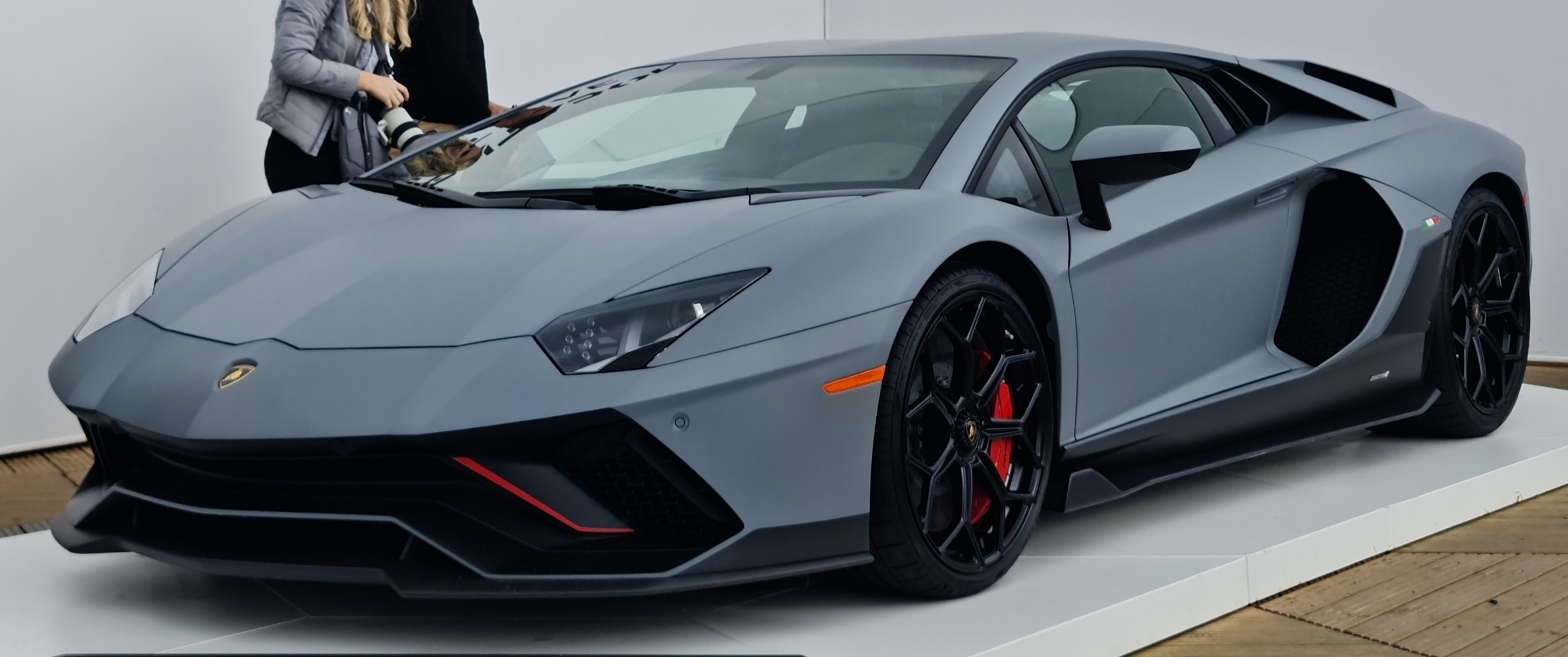
Aventador LP 780-4 Ultimae

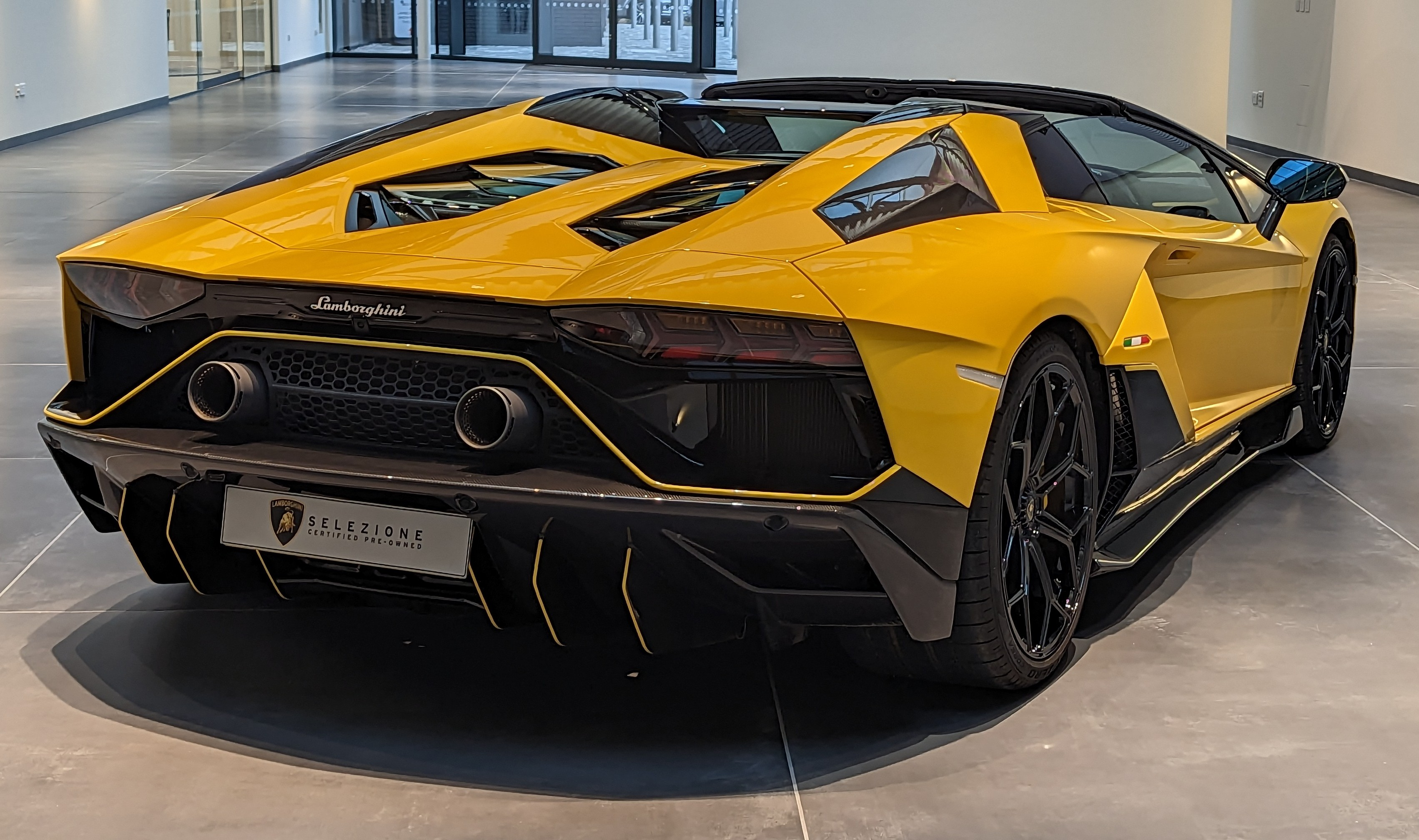
Rear view

The last variant was announced at on Lamborghini's social channels in July 2021. It was limited to 600 units (350 Coupés, 250 Roadsters). It came with the standard features of the Aventador S and SVJ. The engine produces 780 PS (574 kW; 769 hp) and the same 720 N⋅m (531 lb⋅ft) of torque as the SVJ. Lamborghini claimed acceleration from 0–100 km/h (0–62 mph) in 2.84 seconds, with a top speed of 220 mph (354 km/h). The Coupé has a claimed kerb weight of 1,550 kg (3,417 lb).

In February 2022, after production had ended, 15 cars were destroyed when car carrier ship Felicity Ace, caught fire and sank near the Azores. Lamborghini restarted production of the Ultimae to replace those 15 destroyed cars. The very last Ultimae, and thus the very last production Aventador rolled off the line in July 2022. It was customized as an homage to a one-of-a-kind 1968 Lamborghini Miura P400, painted in Azzuro Flake blue with silver wheels and white leather interior.

In April 2022, the last Lamborghini Aventador LP 780-4 Ultimae Coupé ever produced was sold at an RM Sotheby's auction for over US$1.6 million, paired with a 1 of 1 NFT.

== Special editions ==
=== Aventador J ===
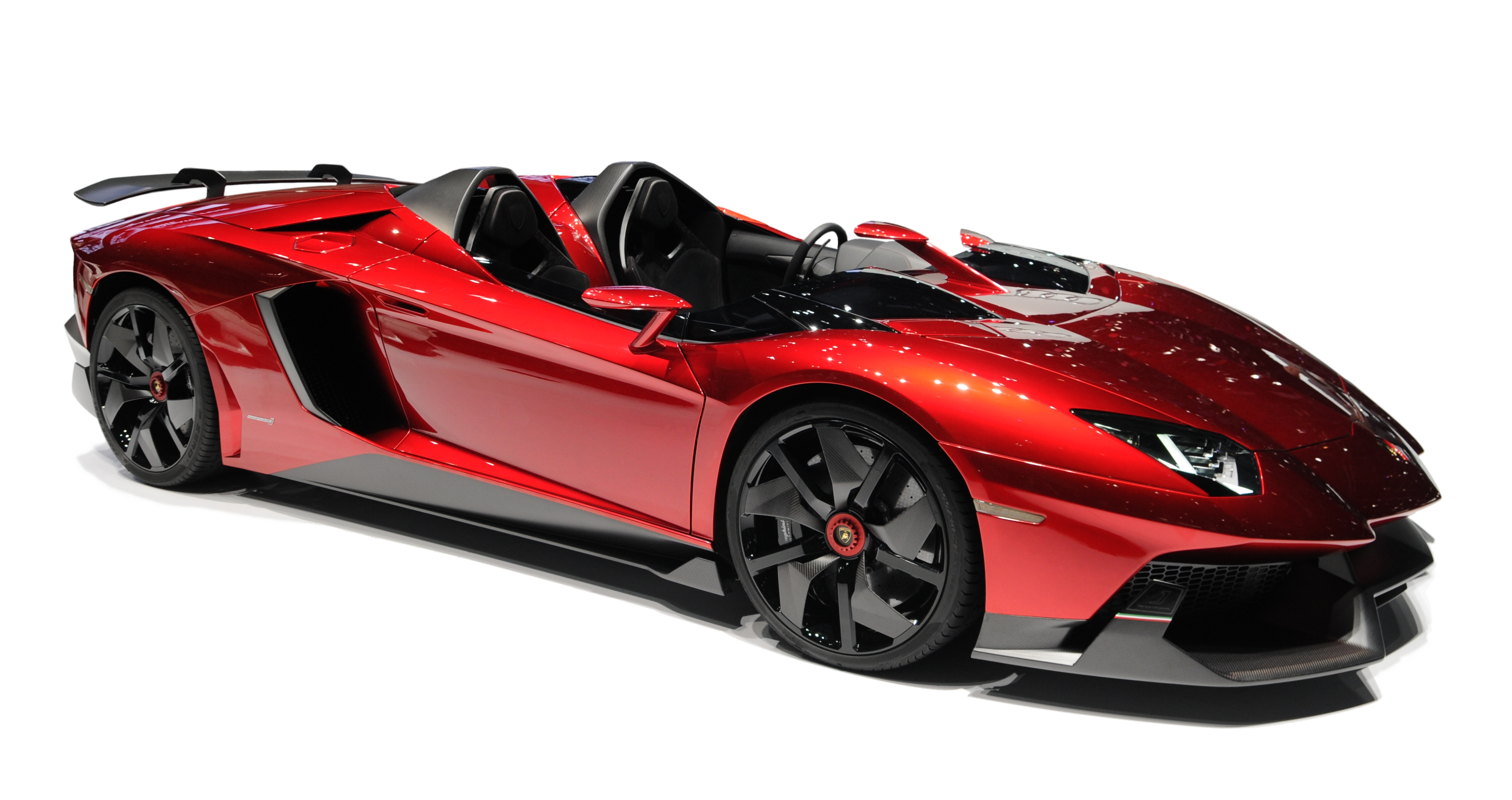
Aventador J

Six months after unveiling the Aventador, plans for a roadster version were leaked by the U.S. EPA by including the model on a data sheet on its website. Lamborghini officially unveiled the Aventador J to the world at the 2012 Geneva Motor Show. The barchetta concept car used the same V12 engine as the standard Aventador, producing 700 PS (690 hp; 515 kW) with the same transmission as the coupé. It did not have air conditioning or radio to save further weight, for a total of 3,472 lb (1,575 kg). The car presented at the Geneva show was the only unit to be produced, and was sold out at an auction for US$2.8 million.

The J designation was thought to have come from Appendix J in the FIA rulebook that describes the technical specifications of race cars. However, during an interview with designer Filippo Perini, it was revealed that the 'J' actually stands for Jota, in reference to a 1970s one-off Lamborghini Miura Jota, which also conformed to the FIA's Appendix J regulations.

=== Aventador LP 720-4 50º Anniversario (2013) ===
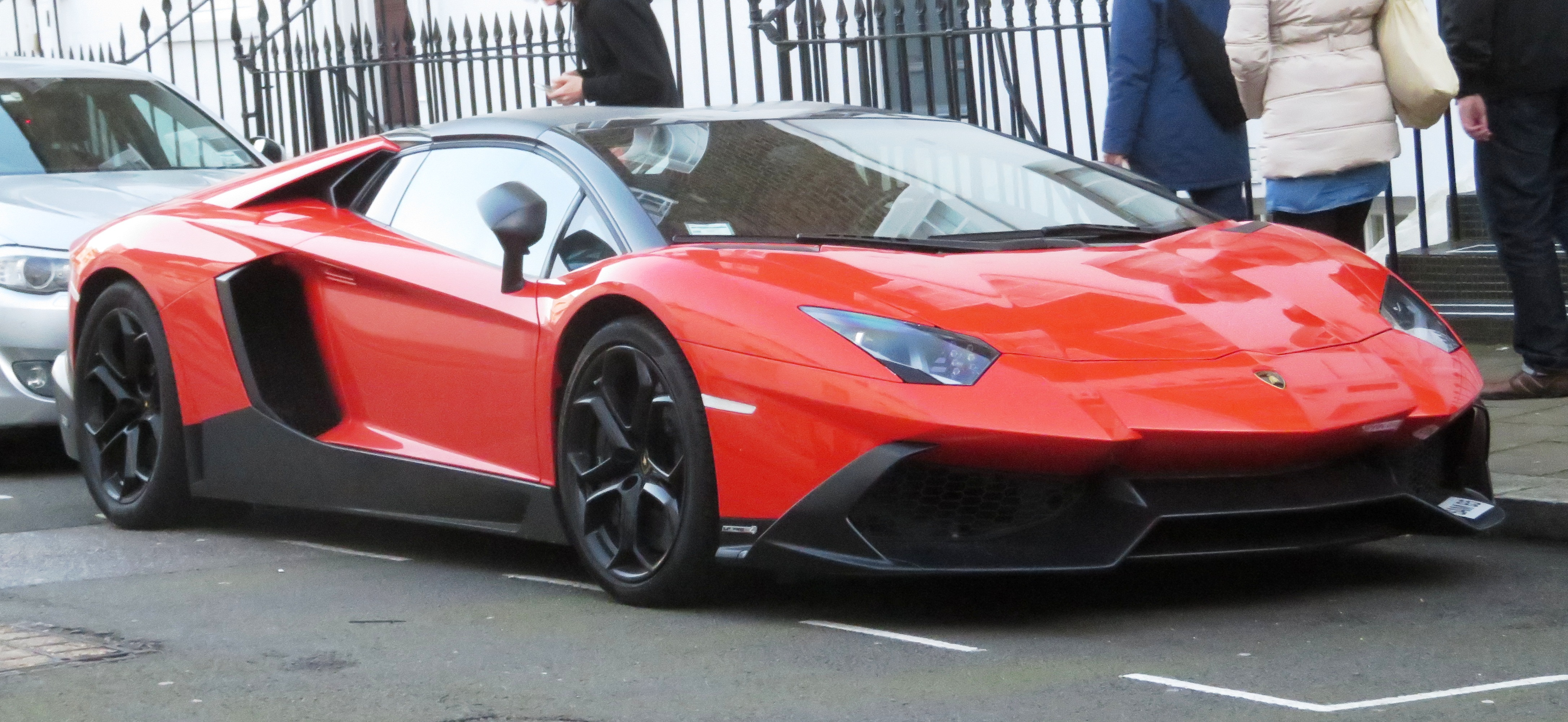
Aventador LP 720-4 50º Anniversario roadster

The Aventador LP 720-4 50º Anniversario is a limited (200 units - 100 coupé and 100 roadster) version of the LP 700-4 commemorating the 50th anniversary of Automobili Lamborghini. It had increased engine power to 720 PS (530 kW; 710 bhp) via a new engine calibration, enlarged and extended front air intakes and aerodynamic splitter, small side flaps, new rear end enlarged diffuser and expansive meshwork that further improved engine-compartment ventilation, model-exclusive Giallo Maggio (Italian for "May yellow") body colour, front and rear matte-black sills, semi-aniline leather upholstery in Nero Ade (black) with Terra Emilia (optional Giallo Quercus (yellow)) with Q-Citura stitch diamond pattern, and 50th anniversary emblem in forged composite carbon-fibre.

The coupé was unveiled at the 2013 Shanghai Motor Show.

The roadster was unveiled at the 2013 Quail Motorsports Gathering.

=== Aventador Pirelli Edition (2014) ===
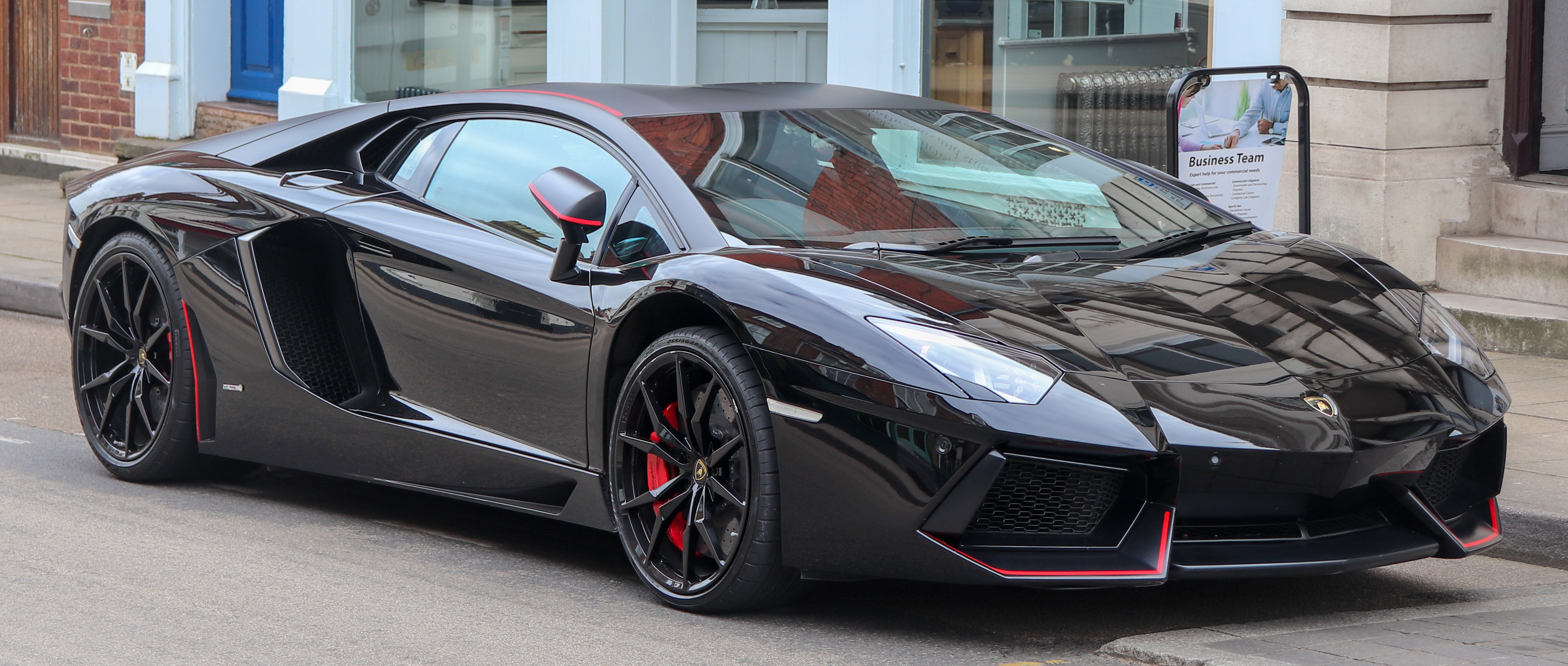
Aventador Pirelli Edition

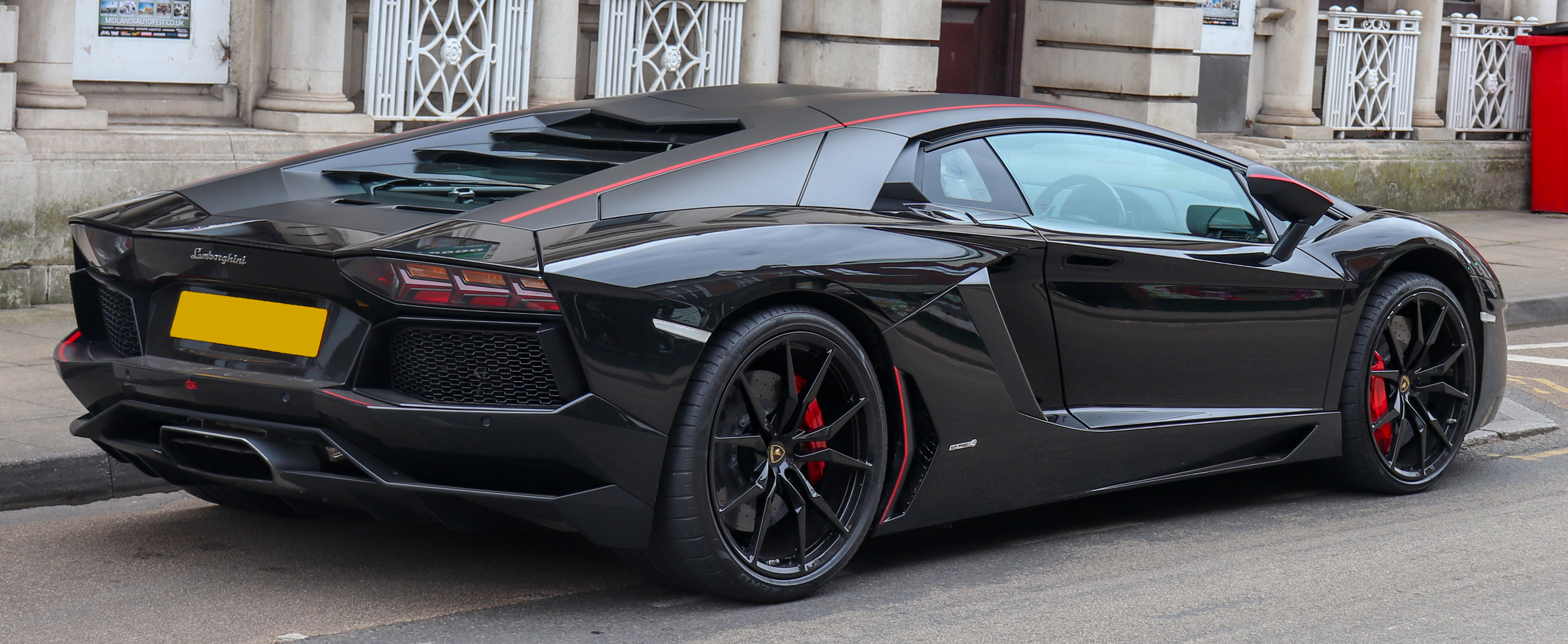

The Pirelli Edition was announced in December 2014. Celebrating a 50-year association between Lamborghini and Pirelli, it featured a design and colour scheme that echoed the Pirelli tyre, with a thin red stripe running across the roof. It came in both Coupé and Roadster forms.

=== Aventador SVJ 63 (2018) ===
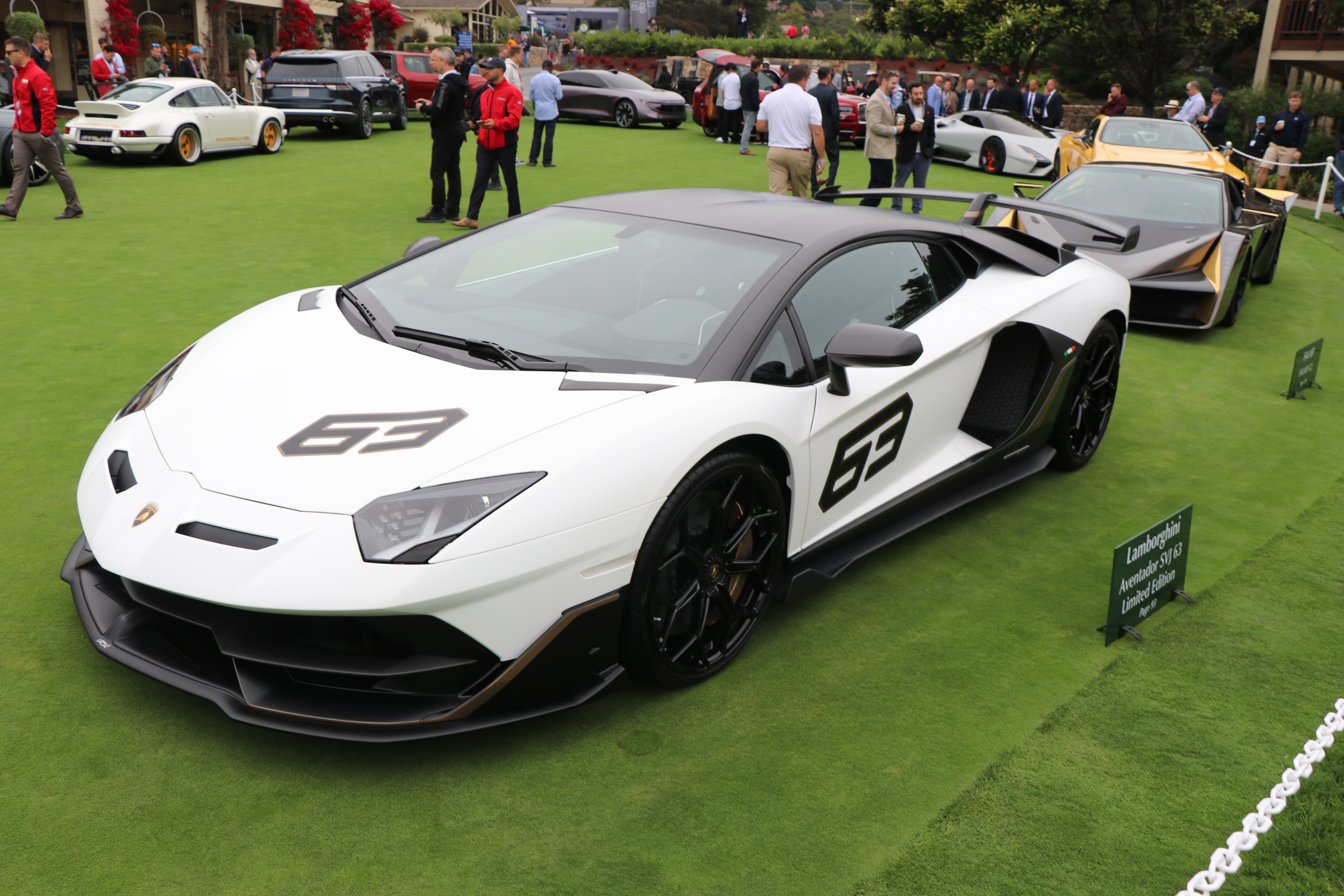
SVJ 63 at the 2018 Pebble Beach Concours d'Elegance

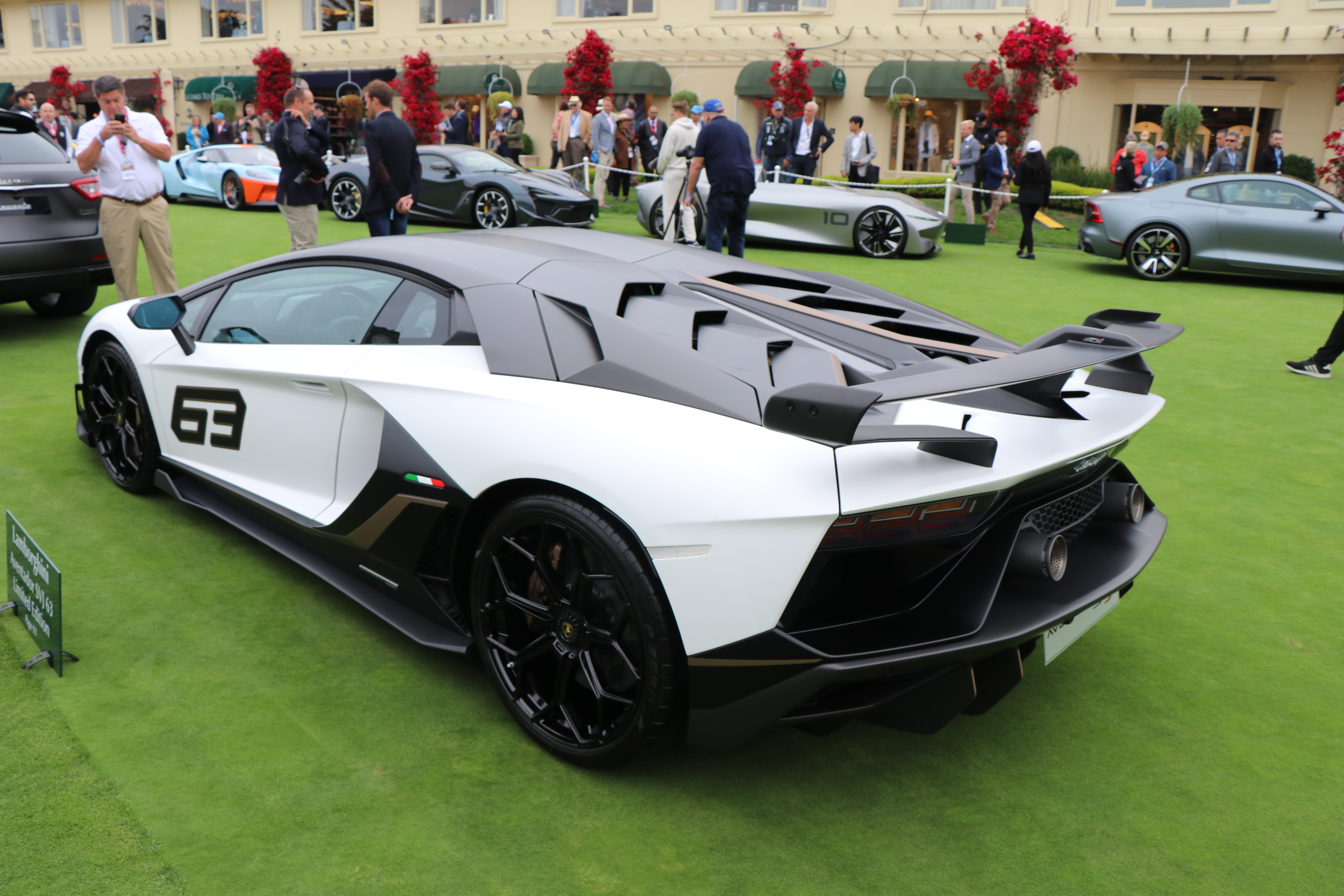

The SVJ "63 Edition" commemorated the company's 1963 year of foundation. It featured a white livery prominently featuring the number 63 with production limited to 63 units. Deliveries were to start at the beginning of 2019.

=== Aventador SVJ 63 Roadster (2019) ===
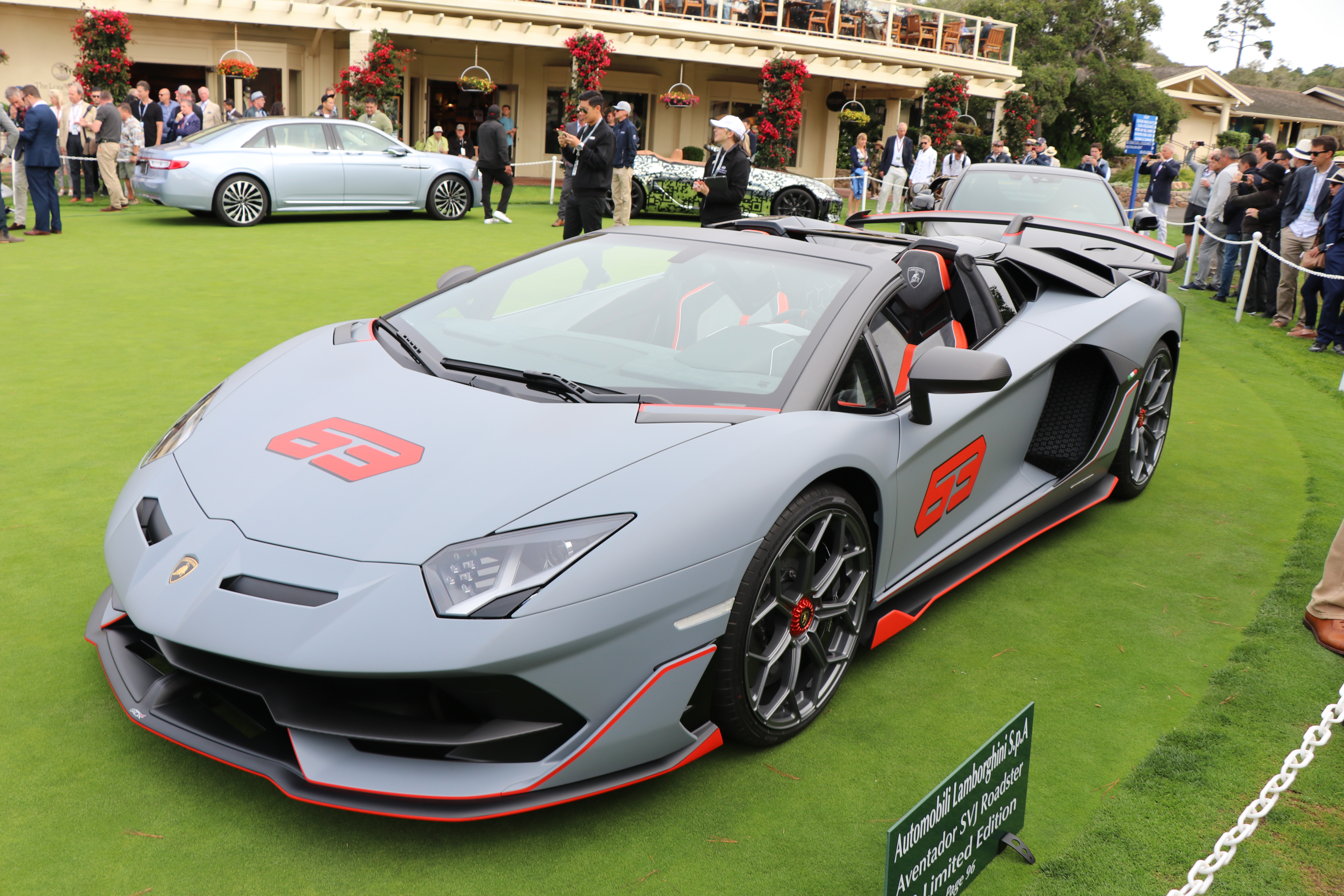
SVJ 63 Roadster at the 2019 Pebble Beach Concours d'Elegance

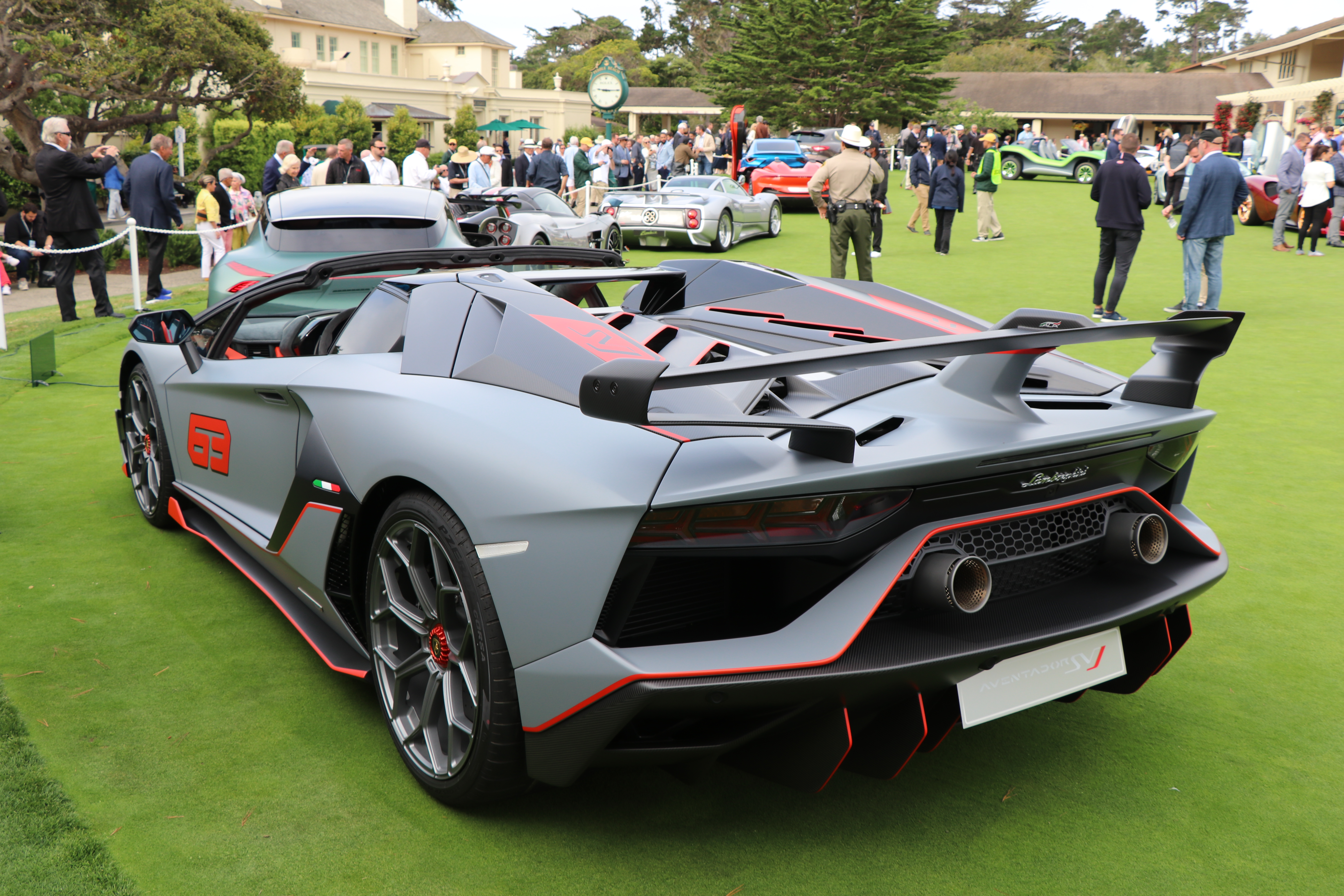

The SVJ 63 Roadster is a special edition of the SVJ, unveiled at Monterey Car Week in August 2019. It paid tribute to the 2018 and 2019 24 Hours of Daytona and 12 Hours of Sebring victories. 63 were built, the number representing Lamborghini's founding in 1963. Technical specifications were the same as the SVJ Roadster.

=== Aventador SVJ Roadster Xago Edition (2020) ===
The Xago Edition was unveiled on July 17, 2020, for clients of the newly created virtual version of the Ad Personam studio, based on the standard SVJ Roadster. Taking inspiration from the hexagonal storms of Saturn, the exterior colour scheme of the car took 120 hours and another 80 hours for the interior to be reworked to match. Only ten were produced. Technical specifications are the same as the SVJ Roadster.

== Limited production derivatives ==
=== Veneno ===
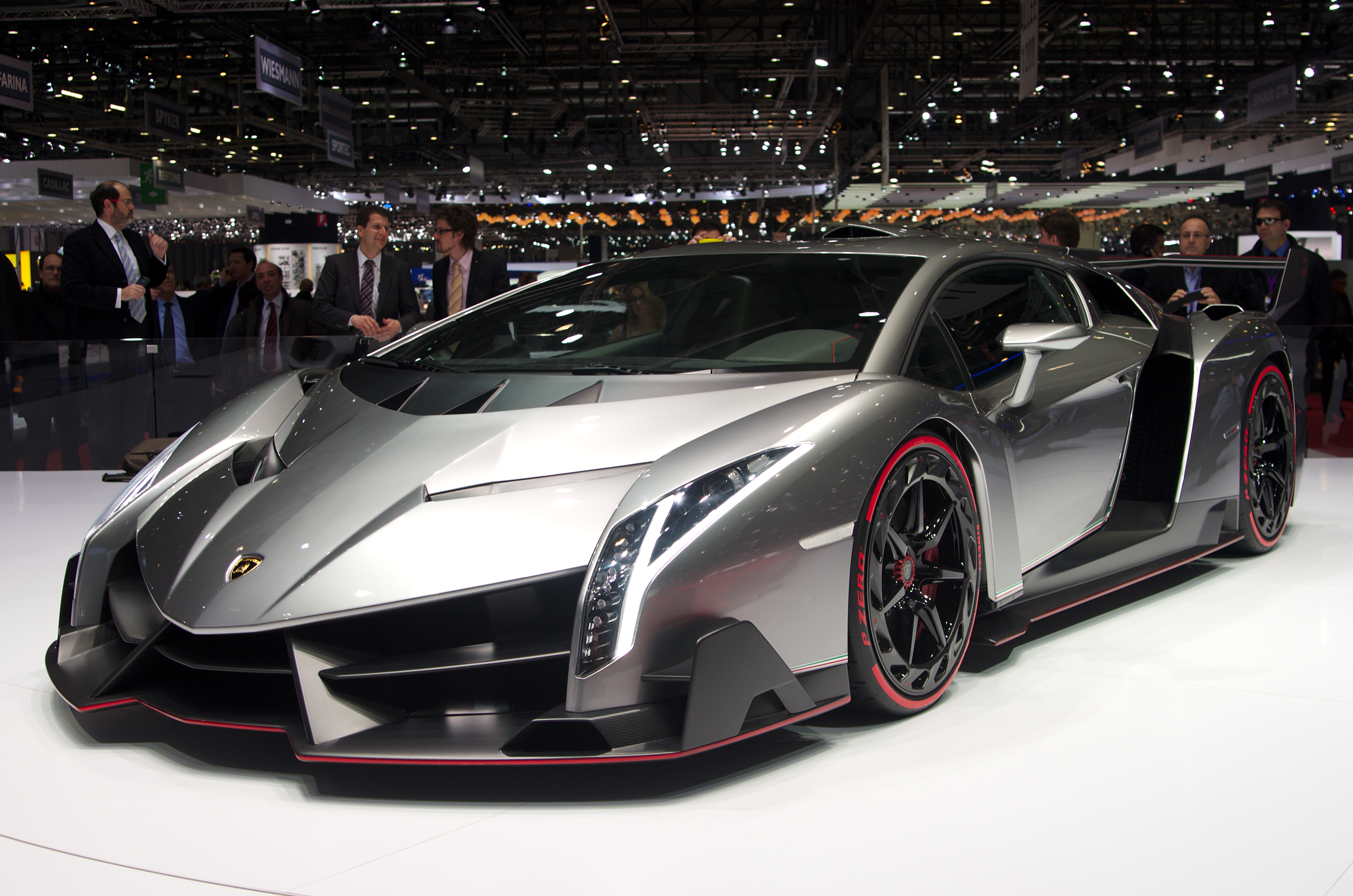
Lamborghini Veneno at the 2013 Geneva Motor Show

The Veneno is a 2014 limited-run supercar based on the Aventador LP 700–4. Developed to celebrate Lamborghini's 50th anniversary, it was introduced at the 2013 Geneva Motor Show with a price of US$4,000,000, making it one of the most expensive production cars in the world. The 6.5-litre naturally aspirated V12 generated 552 kW (740 hp; 750 PS) at 8,400 rpm and 690 N⋅m (509 lb⋅ft) of torque at 5,500 rpm. The increase in power was achieved by enlarging the air intakes and modifying the exhaust system. Just four Coupés were built: one retained for the factory, and three cars for customers, all of which had different accent colours representing the Italian flag. A further nine roadster versions were produced.

=== Centenario ===
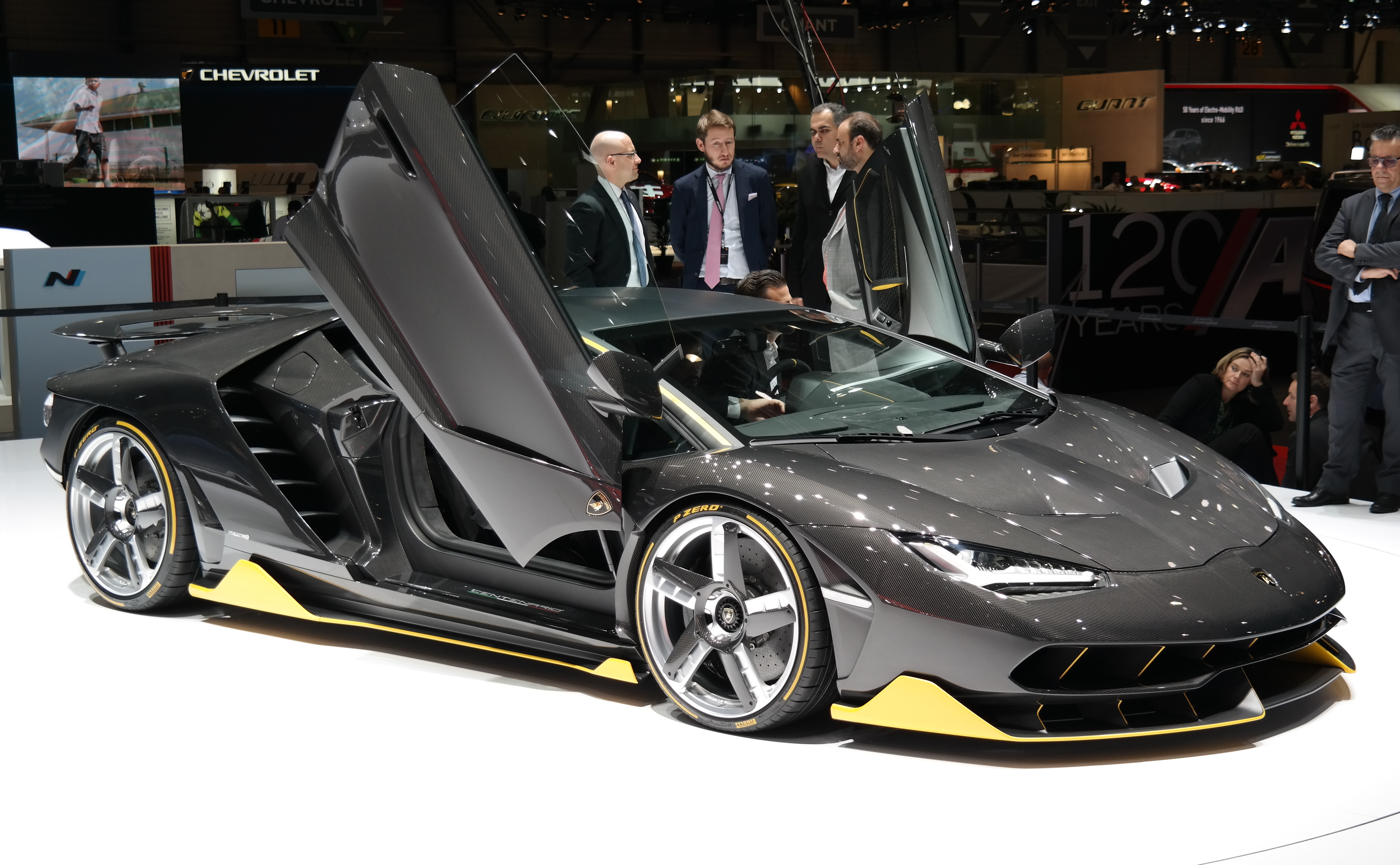
Lamborghini Centenario at the 2016 Geneva Motor Show

The Centenario was based on the Aventador SV. The coupé was unveiled at the 2016 Geneva Motor Show and the roadster was unveiled at The Quail, during Monterey Car Week 2016 to celebrate the 100th birthday of Ferruccio Lamborghini. Power comes from a tuned version of the 6.5-litre naturally aspirated V12 generating 566 kW (759 hp; 770 PS) at 8,500 rpm and 690 N⋅m (509 lb⋅ft) of torque at 5,500 rpm, therefore increasing power over the SV by 15 kW (20 hp; 20 PS). The Centenario also had a slight weight reduction from the SV of 5 kg (11 lb). The engine is mated to the same 7-speed ISR automated manual gearbox as used on the SV, along with the all-wheel-drive drivetrain and two turns lock-to-lock power steering. The suspension system is a push-rod design. A total of 40 units were produced (20 coupés and 20 roadsters), all of which were pre-sold via invitation to selected customers.

=== SC18 Alston ===
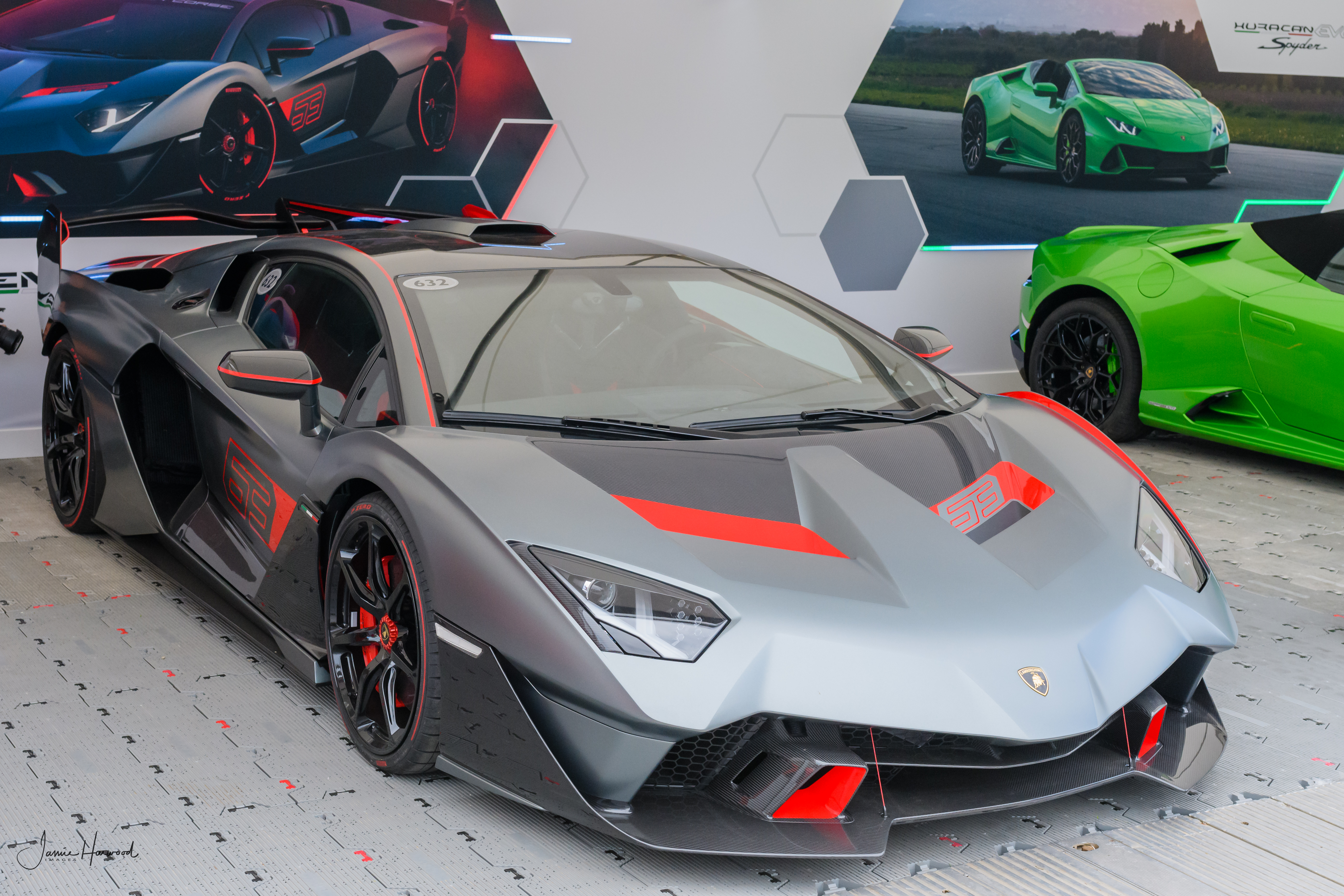
SC18 Alston

Unveiled in November 2018, the SC18 Alston is a track-focused one-off created for a customer in close collaboration with Lamborghini's motorsport division Squadra Corse. Based on the SVJ, it incorporated aerodynamic elements taken from the Huracán GT3 and the Huracán Super Trofeo EVO. Main features included a large adjustable carbon-fibre rear wing, Huracán GT3 front air intakes on the hood, unique Veneno-like wheels, a one-off exhaust system, rear lights from the Centenario, rear fenders, hood scoops and the central fin from the Huracán Super Trofeo Evo, and a new front bumper. All these changes gave it 759 hp (770 PS) and 720 N⋅m (531 lb⋅ft) of torque. The mechanical components and drivetrain remained the same as the donor car.

=== SC20 Alston ===
A one-off bespoke model developed in collaboration with Lamborghini Squadra Corse, the Alston SC20 followed a similar ethos to the Aventador J with its barchetta body and added elements from the track-oriented Essenza SCV12. It featured a detuned variant of the 6.5 L V12 used on the Essenza, now rated at 759 hp (770 PS; 566 kW) at 8,500 rpm and 720 N⋅m (531 lb⋅ft) of torque at 6,750 rpm. Visual changes to the car, aside from the speedster styling, included a distinctive front splitter, side mirrors from the Essenza SCV12, specially designed headlights, elongated front hood air intakes similar to the Huracan GT3 Evo, and a carbon fibre rear spoiler which offers three configurations for varying levels of downforce. It was painted Bianco Fu white with Blu Cepheus accents. The interior featured Nero Cosmos leather with Blu Cepheus accents.

=== Sián FKP 37 ===
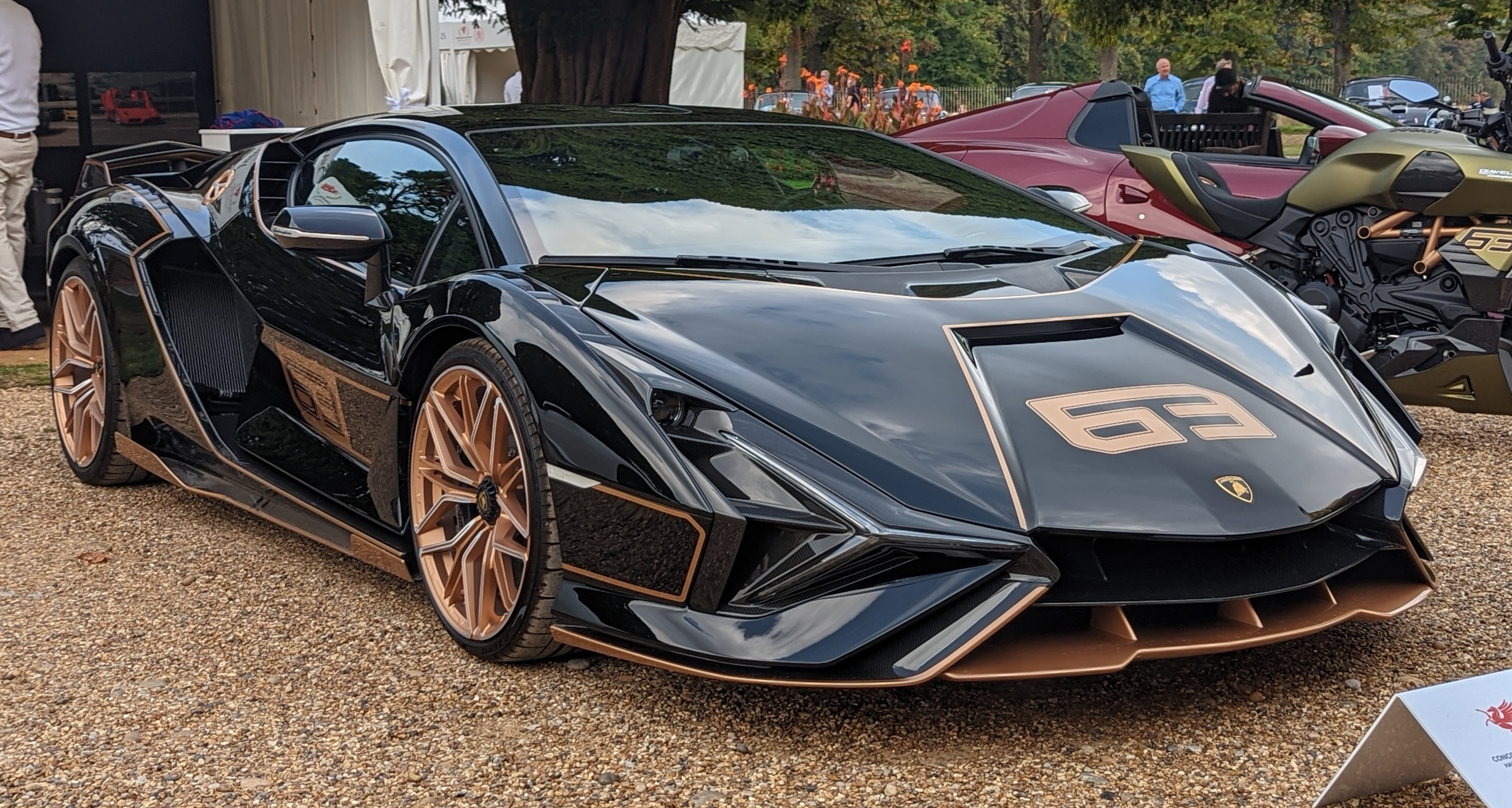
Lamborghini Sián FKP 37

The Sián FKP 37 was the first Lamborghini hybrid, and was manufactured by the Ad Personam division. It honoured the late Ferdinand Karl Piëch (whose initials emboss the name of the car), and his birth year 1937 (the last two digits make up the name of the car as well). Power comes from a reconfigured SVJ V12 and an electric motor powered by supercapacitors at the rear axle, for a total of 603 kW (808 hp; 819 PS) making the Sián the most powerful production Lamborghini ever at its online launch on 3 September 2019. The exterior design incorporated a trademark Marcello Gandini wedge shape mixed with designs from the Terzo Millennio concept car introduced two years prior. The Y-shaped daytime running lamps are inspired by the Lamborghini Terzo Millennio, while an active rear wing with "63" embossed on its winglets honours the company's year of incorporation. Downforce is maximised by prominent side air intakes and large carbon fibre front splitter. A transparent "Peroscopio" glass panel runs from the centre of the roof and rolls back into the slatted engine cover. Six hexagonal taillights were inspired by the Countach. It was unveiled at the 2019 Frankfurt Motor Show configured in a unique "electric gold" paint. The coupé was limited to 63 units and the roadster 19 units.

=== Essenza SCV12 ===
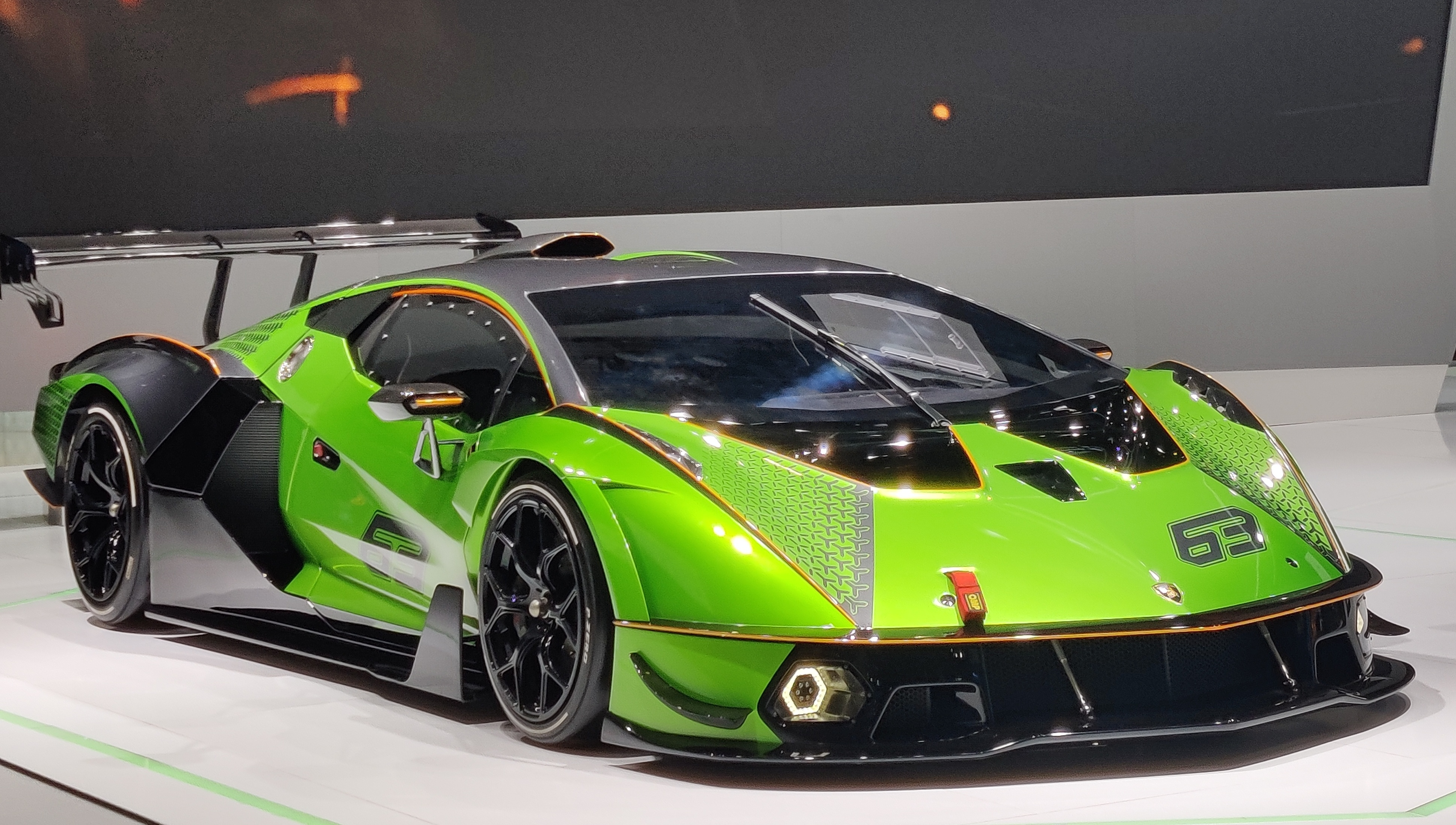
Lamborghini Essenza SCV12

The Essenza SCV12 is a track-only model built by Lamborghini's motorsport division, Squadra Corse. When it was unveiled on July 29, 2020, it was the most powerful naturally aspirated production car, with 610 kW (819 hp; 830 PS) achieved by a horizontally mounted 6.5-litre naturally aspirated V12 from the SVJ and a ram air induction system. It is 136 kg (300 lb) lighter than the SVJ and features a carbon fibre monocoque which was the first to be homologated without the use of metal. It was also the first car to be developed according to the FIA prototype safety rules. It has a power-to-weight ratio of 1.66 kg per hp and generates a downforce of 1,200 kg (2,600 lb) at 249 km/h (155 mph), more than a typical GT3 race car. Production was limited to 40 units and was planned to have its own one-make racing series.

=== Countach LPI 800-4 ===
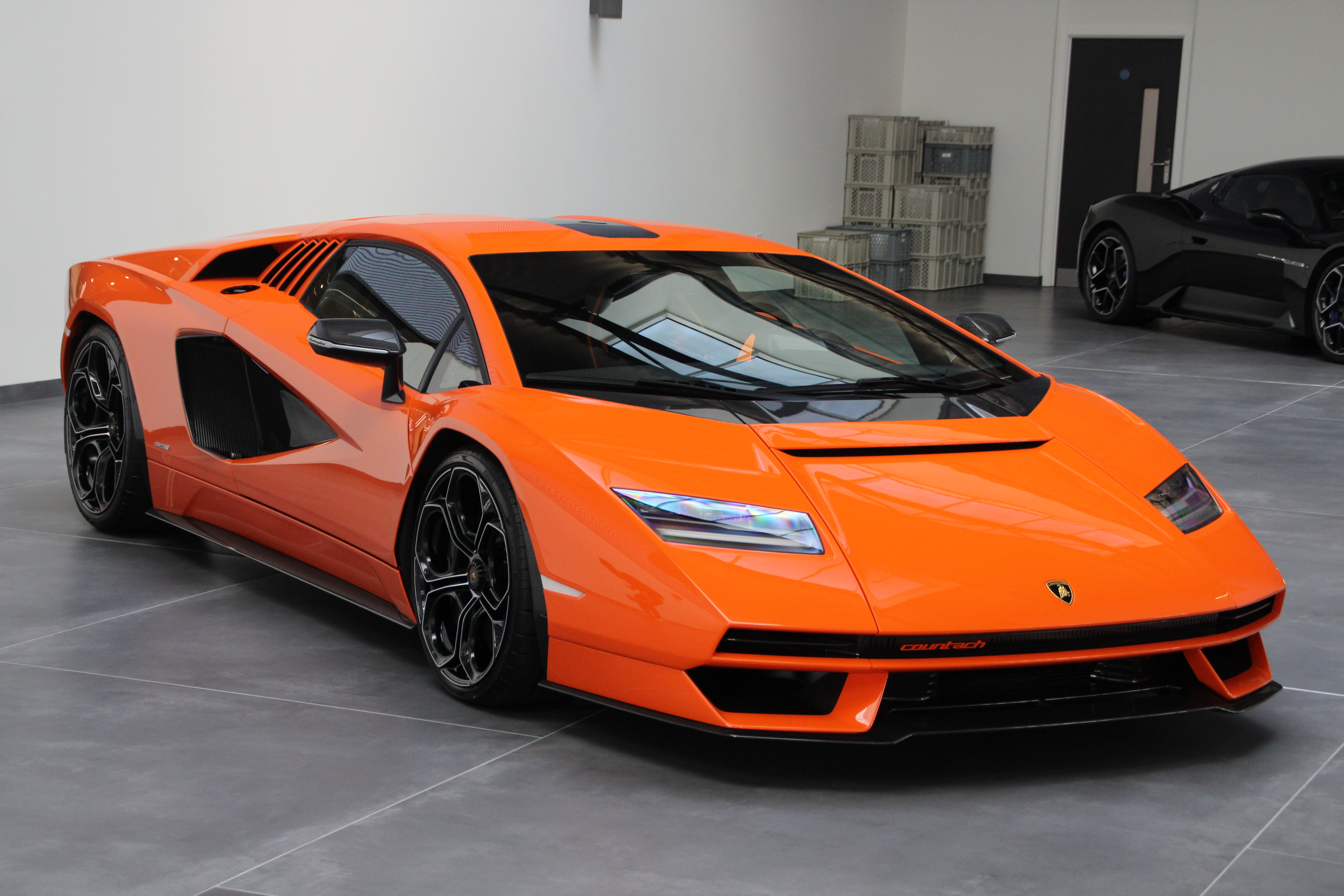
Lamborghini Countach LPI 800-4 front view

A 2021 limited edition hybrid derivative that took inspiration from the original Countach and elements from the Sián FKP 37. 0-100 km/h (62 mph) acceleration was 2.8 seconds with a top speed of 355 km/h (221 mph). Production was limited to 112 units, a number inspired by the LP112 type code of the original Countach project.

== Reception ==
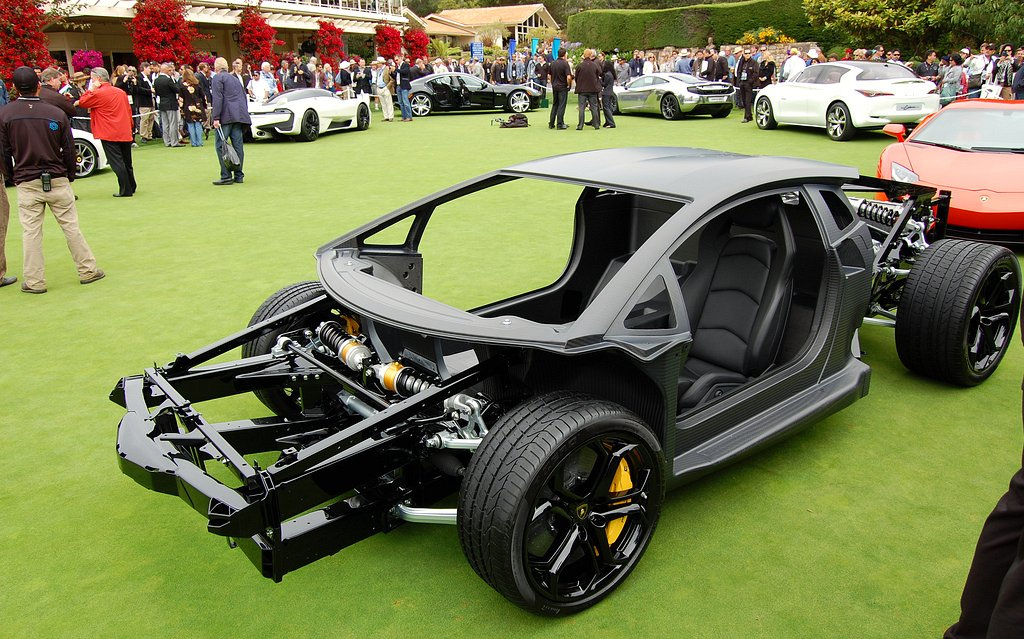
Unibody construction as used for the Aventador LP 700-4

Car and Driver titled their article "The Best Lamborghini Ever." Motor Trend described it as "the friendliest V12 supercar in the world." Praise for the new V12 powerplant centered on the engine's responsiveness, torque, and smooth power output. Criticism centered mainly around the Aventador's unrefined single-disc clutch.

On 31 July 2011, the Aventador was reviewed by the motorsport show Top Gear. Host Richard Hammond was impressed with its performance and handling. His biggest complaint was a nostalgic poke at its accessible temperament, implying that it left him longing for the "danger" associated with driving previous Lamborghinis. The Aventador posted the fifth fastest time ever recorded on the Top Gear test track with a time of 1:16.5. In season 18 of the programme, presenter Jeremy Clarkson said that the Aventador was better than the Ferrari 458 Italia (which they had previously called the best supercar ever), describing it as being "£200,000 worth of dreams." The Aventador won the "Supercar of the Year 2011" from Top Gear. Hammond later reviewed the Aventador Roadster in a segment covering 50 years of Lamborghini.

== Marketing ==
Robert Gülpen of RGE Robert Gülpen Engineering GmbH produced a 1/8-scale model Aventador LP 700-4 that was sold at auction December 2011 with starting bid price of US$4,700,000 (€3,500,000). A second model, featuring a 25 kg gold body, was set to go for sale at auction with a starting bid price of US$7,500,000.

BMC Switzerland produced a 50-unit edition of Lamborghini 50th Anniversary Edition Impec bicycles inspired by the Aventador. The bikes cost US$32,000 (€25,000) each via international BMC or Lamborghini dealer network, with delivery done by the dealer.

To promote the car, a silver Aventador LP 700-4 appears in the 2012 film The Dark Knight Rises and driven by Bruce Wayne.

== Sales ==
Year	Units	Coupé	Roadster
2011	447	447	–
2012	976 (922 deliveries)	958	18
2013	1,113 (1,001 deliveries)	710	403
2014	1,110 (1,128 deliveries)	456	654
2015	1,079 (1,003 deliveries)	666	413
2016	1,160	587	573
2017	1,286	1,008	278
2018	1,216	578	638
2019	1,005	786	219
2020	876	–	–
2021	798	–	–
2022	753	–	–
2023	12		
Total	11,831	6,196 (Note: Missing data)	3,196
