= Paolo Feraboli =

Italian inventor and businessman (born 1976)

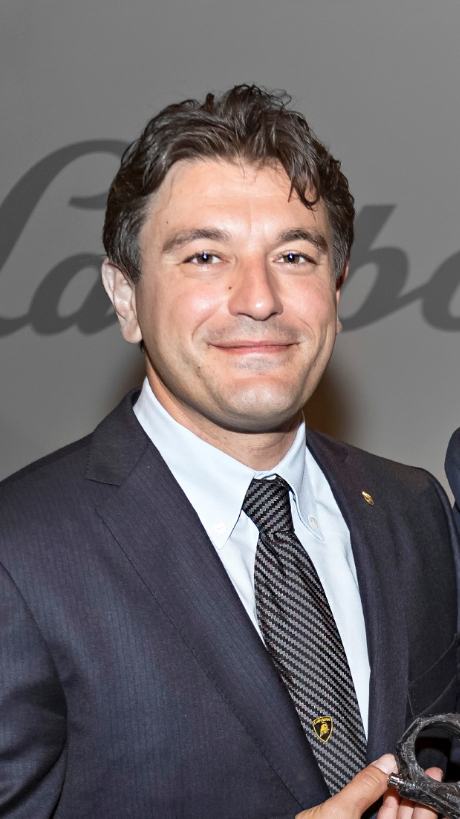
- Feraboli in 2016
- Born: 20 September 1976 (age 49); Bologna, Italy
- Education: University of Bologna (M.E., 2002); University of California at Santa Barbara (Ph.D., 2005)
- Occupations: CTO of Gemini Composites, LLC
- Known for: Forged Composite; Lamborghini Lab

Paolo Feraboli (born September 20, 1976) is a carbon fiber technology inventor and businessman. He is the founder and CTO of Gemini Composites, LLC, a wholly owned subsidiary of Mitsubishi Chemical Carbon Fiber and Composites, and founder and former Director of the Automobili Lamborghini Advanced Composite Structures Laboratory (ACSL). He is known for having invented the Forged Composite technology, and his contributions to the Lamborghini Sesto Elemento and Aventador programs.

== Life ==
Paolo Feraboli was born and grew up in Bologna, Italy. He graduated in mechanical engineering at the University of Bologna in 2002 with a Master's thesis on turbulent heat transfer. He received his doctorate in mechanical engineering from the University of California at Santa Barbara in 2005 with a dissertation on impact of carbon fiber composite structures under the guidance of Professor Keith T. Kedward. Among his mentors during his doctoral studies were composite pioneers such as John Halpin of Air Force Research Laboratory, and Larry Ilcewicz of the Federal Aviation Administration.

== Career ==
=== Lamborghini ===
The relationship between Feraboli and Automobili Lamborghini S.p.A. started in 2001–2002 with an internship at the Esperienza Compositi (R&D composites division) at the headquarters in Sant'Agata Bolognese. Under the supervision of Attilio Masini, Andrea Bonfatti, and Maurizio Reggiani, Feraboli worked on the development of the Murciélago and Murciélago Roadster carbon fiber components in the body and chassis.

After years of study and research in the United States, Lamborghini engaged Feraboli in 2007 to spearhead the development of new carbon fiber technologies as well as monocoque and chassis concepts while he was serving as assistant professor at the University of Washington. The successful collaboration led to the formal establishment of the Lamborghini Lab which was located on the UW campus from 2009 until 2013. After inventing Forged Composite technology for Lamborghini, Feraboli left the university in 2014 to focus on its further commercialization for the Italian car manufacturer. In order to do so, he opened a new stand-alone Lamborghini Lab which was to be the only Lamborghini R&D organization outside of the headquarters in Italy. The new facility, inaugurated in 2016, included the Carbon Fiber Technology Gallery and Lamborghini Academy of Carbon Arts & Sciences.

The legacy of Paolo Feraboli with Lamborghini is notable in the following achievements:

- Aventador monocoque design and crash certification (homologation) using the aerospace-derived Building Block Approach
- Aventador liquid resin infusion materials and processes used for the entirely out-of-autoclave monocoque
- Aventador repair strategy including the "Flying Doctors" for carbon fiber composite repair
- Sesto Elemento monocoque design, materials, and processes
- Sesto Elemento Forged Composite suspension arms
- Aventador Forged Composite connecting rod prototypes
- The new marbled look of carbon fiber (the so-called "Forged Composite look") introduced first on the Sesto Elemento, then applied to the interior and exterior of the Aventador J, Veneno, Huracan, and Huracan Performante
- Creation of novel test procedures for chopped carbon fiber composites
- Pioneering use of 3D printing technology to make both artistic and engineering scale models
- Highly acclaimed special series of scale models, Collezione Tecnica

=== Aerospace ===
Feraboli was introduced to the world of carbon fiber in aerospace by one of the founding fathers of composite technologies, his UCSB doctoral advisor Professor Keith Kedward. Professor Kedward was a fellow of AIAA, fellow of American Society of Composites (ASC), winner of the prestigious AIAA-ASC Starnes Award.

Feraboli's research on aircraft foreign object damage (FOD) brought him to the NASA Langley Research Center in 2004–2005. There he conducted experiments and analysis on impact damage on carbon fiber structures for the blended wing body project, along with other projects in the Mechanics and Durability branch.

In 2005, Feraboli was hired by the University of Washington to expand the recently established Boeing/FAA Center of Excellence for composites research, guided by the FAA Chief Scientist for Composites Dr. Larry Ilcewicz. In his new laboratory, Feraboli pioneered the first research in the public domain in chopped carbon fiber technology for commercial transport aircraft, lightning strike damage on composites, and composite crashworthiness. Because of his contributions in these fields, he received awards from the Japan Society for Composite Materials (JSCM), American Society for Composites (ASC), and MIL-17.

While a professor at UW, Feraboli also worked in the Boeing 787 Technology Integration team in Everett, WA under Dr. Alan Miller and Dr. Patrick Stickler. Within this group, he conducted a critical review of all 787 composite analysis methods, including in-house tools and external software, and acted as the liaison with the Structural Methods and Allowables group, under William Sheridan.

Feraboli is the founder and former chairman (2004–2012) of the Working Group on Composite Crashworthiness of the CMH-17 (formerly MIL-HDBK-17), the long established DoD/DoT organization aimed at providing recommendations on the use of composite materials.

Ever since his Boeing and FAA experience, Feraboli has been a strong advocate for the Building Block Approach, also known as Certification by Analysis supported by test evidence. He has often spoken publicly to caution on the use of so-called predictive analysis tools for composites, especially in the area of crashworthiness.

=== Gemini Composites, LLC ===
In 2012 Feraboli incorporated a design and engineering firm called Gemini Composites, which focused on the commercialization of Forged Composite technology. Such breakthrough technology requires specific know-how in material, process, and design alike, and Gemini offered these services for OEMs worldwide and across multiple industries.

At Gemini, Feraboli assisted OEMs in the development of several consumer goods, including:

- The Callaway Golf Diablo Octane and Razr Hawk golf club heads
- The Union Binding Company FC and Ultra snowboard bindings, which won the prestigious 2014 ISPO Product of the year award
- Several global and regional patents for mountain bikes and lacrosse heads

Gemini Composites supported several other OEMs in developmental and research projects, including Northrop Grumman, Lockheed Martin, Toyota, Ducati, Volvo, Honda North America, and Nike.

In March 2017, Gemini Composites was acquired by Mitsubishi Rayon Co. (now Mitsubishi Chemical), to expand the use of Forged Composite technology under the new name Forged Molding Compound (FMC).

In 2017, Toyota introduced a version of Forged Composite technology in the production of the Prius prime (PHV). The inner structure of the rear hatch is the first carbon fiber component used in a mass-produced vehicle thanks to the unique benefits of the new FMC technology. Mitsubishi Chemical, supplier of the Prius FMC material, is now the world's largest producer of Forged composite raw material worldwide.

While at Gemini, under the new MCC ownership, Dr. Feraboli trademarked the name Forged Molding Compound, or FMC, to indicate the commercial name of the CFSMC marketed by MCC. The name uniquely identifies the MCC material as opposed to the Forged Composite, trademarked by Automobili Lamborghini SpA, and the more generic Forged Carbon, which is not trademarked and is used by many enterprises such as Union Binding Company.

Between 2017 and 2021, Dr. Feraboli supported Mitsubishi Chemical by leading the Global Engineering team, which was spread between Japan, USA, and Europe, and was tasked with the development of material property data and FEA analysis method generation for carbon fiber technology.

The last development projects Dr. Feraboli brought to life while at Gemini were presented at the JEC show of May 2022 in Paris, France. These included the automotive FMC suspension arm, which was innovatively engineered to meet and exceed the performance, weight and cost targets of the production forged aluminum wishbone arm. The design and fabrication process were patented and showcased also at the automotive SPE conference in April 2021. Finally, the rear subframe of the Ducati Hypermotard, which was developed in 2017–2019, was designed to be used as a 1-to-1 FMC replacement for the cast aluminum production part, and met all durability requirements with minimal re-engineering.

=== Present ===
After the completion of the technology transfer from Gemini to MCC, Dr. Feraboli exited the company to join Rivian Automotive in September 2021, as Sr. Lead engineer in the Prototypes and Special Projects division. Shortly after, Rivian launched the production of the R1T electric adventure truck and became listed on the Nasdaq market, the 5th largest IPO in the US history. In August 2022 Dr. Feraboli joined the Advanced Development Projects division at Blue Origin, which develops projects such as the Orbital Reef and Human Landing System, as Director of Mechanical, Material and Structural Engineering.

== Awards ==
For his contributions in the field of carbon fiber composites, Paolo Feraboli has received awards from the American Society for Composites, the Japan Society for Composite Materials, and the MIL-HDBK-17. He also holds an honorary research professor position at the Nagoya Institute of Technology in Japan.
