= Lamborghini Lab =

US research facility

Coordinates: 47°39′00″N 122°22′45″W

The Automobili Lamborghini Advanced Composite Structures Laboratory (ACSL), commonly referred to as the Lamborghini Lab (or Lambo Lab), was a research and development facility based in Seattle, Washington from 2007 to 2018, which focused on the development of carbon fiber composite technologies for Automobili Lamborghini S.p.A. The ACSL also designed and developed carbon fiber products for other organizations in other industries. The hallmark technology pioneered by the Lamborghini Lab is the forged composite technology.

For Lamborghini, the ACSL was responsible for carbon fiber technology innovation, such as experimenting with new materials and processes, as well as structural concept development and generating new body-in-white concepts. For other organizations, the ACSL provided design, engineering, testing, and educational services for carbon fiber composite products.

The facility, located in the Interbay neighborhood of Seattle, also had a museum on carbon fiber materials and manufacturing that was open from 2015 to 2018.

== History ==
=== 2007 to 2013 ===
The ACSL began as an academic research laboratory under the guidance of Professor Paolo Feraboli at the University of Washington in Seattle. The lab was initially co-sponsored by aircraft manufacturer Boeing and the Federal Aviation Administration, and focused on conducting research in areas that were pertinent to the certification of the carbon fiber composite-intensive Boeing 787 Dreamliner aircraft. These topics included certification methodologies for chopped carbon fiber technology, lightning strike damage, and crashworthiness of composite structures. In 2007, Lamborghini began co-sponsoring the ACSL with the purpose of creating a research collaboration between the aerospace and automotive industries in the field of advanced carbon fiber composite structures. The official inauguration of the ACSL took place on October 6, 2009 with Lamborghini President Stephan Winkelmann and Chief Technical Officer Maurizio Reggiani, Boeing CEO Scott Carson, and UW President Mark Emmert. Following the establishment of the ACSL, Lamborghini opened the Advanced Composites Research Center (ACRC) at its headquarters in Italy in July 2010.

The collaboration between Boeing and Lamborghini through the ACSL led to the incorporation of the aerospace engineering development mentality at Lamborghini known as the Building Block Approach. This approach calls for progressive correlation between analysis and experimental test data at different levels of structural complexity, from material coupons, to structural components and assemblies, to the full scale structure. The Building Block Approach was first used by Lamborghini ACSL and ACRC on the Aventador program for the development of the first out-of-autoclave carbon fiber monocoque. In particular, the Building Block Approach enabled the Aventador to pass its crash test certification on its first try.

The ACSL and ACRC were responsible for the development, characterization, and testing of liquid resin infusion technologies (such as VaRTM and RTM) for the Aventador monocoque.

Another area of collaboration between Boeing and Lamborghini researched at the ACSL focused on composite repair technologies. For the 787 aircraft, Boeing utilizes specialized technicians and engineers, called Aircraft on Ground crews, to fly out to a damaged aircraft and perform structural repairs on the composite airframe. The ACSL adopted, modified, and transferred these technologies, processes, and equipment to Lamborghini for use on the Aventador supercar. Lamborghini trained a similar team of specialized technicians, called the Flying Doctors, and became the first automaker to be certified for structural repair of composites by the Technischer Überwachungsverein German TÜV and insurance companies worldwide.

The collaboration between Boeing and Lamborghini was celebrated in 2012 by painting an Aventador in a special Boeing livery for the Washington State showcase at the 2012 Aerospace & Defense Supplier Summit in Seattle.

The ACSL also performed research in the area of 3D printing, in particular 3D printed high temperature prototype mold manufacturing, and 3D printed Class A surfaces class A surface finish models.

While at the University of Washington, the ACSL sponsored and graduated three Ph.D. students (Dr. Federico Gasco, Dr. Hirohide Kawakami, and Dr. Bonnie Wade) as well as 30 Master's and undergraduate students.

=== 2014 to 2018 ===
The ACSL exited the University of Washington on January 1, 2014 with Dr. Paolo Feraboli in order to transition from research into application and product development. It was a stand-alone organization located in an independent facility in the Interbay neighborhood of Seattle. The inauguration of the Interbay ACSL facility occurred on June 20, 2016 with Lamborghini President Stefano Domenicali and Chief Technical Officer Maurizio Reggiani.

In addition to the research laboratory, the ACSL facility also included the Lamborghini Academy of Carbon Arts & Sciences, which offered professional classes on topics such as forged composite technology; and the Carbon Fiber Technology Gallery, which showcased over 30 years of carbon fiber composite innovation at Lamborghini. The ACSL actively engaged in outreach efforts such as student visits and internships with the Washington State Department of Commerce, the Washington Industrial Council, and local schools.

The impact of the technologies developed by the Lambo Lab on the Lamborghini current vehicle lineup is still recognized today.

== Forged composite technology ==
The ACSL is responsible for the pioneering work of forged composite technology, based on previous research of chopped carbon fiber material forms sponsored by Boeing and the FAA between 2006 and 2012. Starting from 2009, The ACSL began to transfer the knowledge developed in the lab to the prototyping division at Callaway Golf and Automobili Lamborghini, which jointly launched the forged composite technology at the 2010 Paris Auto Show. The ACSL designed and produced the first scale prototype of the Sesto Elemento monocoque, which was subsequently transformed into a full scale working monocoque by Lamborghini. Forged composite has since become a key technology for Lamborghini, and has been used in the structure of the Huracán, as well as for the interior trim and seats of the Aventador J, Urus concept, Veneno, Asterion, and Huracan vehicles. The forged composite interior package won the JEC Composites Innovation Award for Automotive Interiors in 2016.

Using forged composite technology, the ACSL has developed for Lamborghini the world's first carbon fiber wishbone suspension arms shown in 2010, and the first carbon fiber connecting rods shown in 2016. The ACSL has continued to introduce forged composite technology in other applications, such as the Union Binding Company FC snowboard binding, which won the ISPO Product of the Year Award in 2014.
