= CFSMC =

Carbon fiber reinforced polymer composite material

CFSMC, or Carbon Fiber Sheet Molding Compound (also known as CSMC or CF-SMC), is a ready to mold carbon fiber reinforced polymer composite material used in compression molding. While traditional SMC utilizes chopped glass fibers in a polymer resin, CFSMC utilizes chopped carbon fibers. The length and distribution of the carbon fibers is more regular, homogeneous, and constant than the standard glass SMC. CFSMC offers much higher stiffness and usually higher strength than standard SMC, but at a higher cost.

== Manufacturing ==
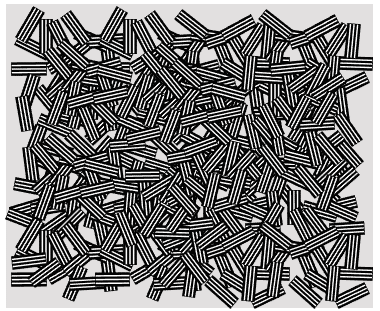
Scheme of the tow-based microstructure of CF-SMC

CF-SMC are made up of carbon tow chunks, spread between two layers of uncured thermosetting resin. The carbon fibre tows are cut from prepreg UD tape. The originating tape can be made up of a certain number of fibres (filaments), thus affecting the properties of the final composite: values can vary from 3 to 50 thousand filaments, while typical tow lengths are within 10 to 50 mm. As for the resin, thermosetting resins are used: possible choices are polyester, vinyl ester or epoxy, with the former being the cheapest and the latter being the most performant. Despite not being as strong nor stiff as epoxy, vinyl ester is often used for its properties like corrosion and higher temperature resistance. The constituents are combined in sheets of prepreg material. The tows usually fall from the cutter onto one of the two layers of resin, and are then covered by the second layer. The prepreg sheets of SMC are made after the viscous assembly is compacted via rollers. In this phase, any control over the orientation of the fibres is generally impossible, and the fibres can be considered to have an equiprobable orientation in all directions.

Once the prepreg sheets are made, the material can be compression moulded into the final desired shape. Compression moulding is a manufacturing technique that requires a two part mould: the first one hosts the moulding material (charge), while the second one is mounted on a press to close the cavity while applying high pressure. Due to complex geometry, it may be necessary to cut the sheets to place them more easily in the lower mould. Then, while the upper mould cavity is closing, the material is pushed throughout the mould until closed. Pressure is maintained, together with elevated temperature, to allow the curing of the resin and low porosity. This stage has a heavy influence on the mechanical performances of the final product, as the viscous flow into the mold cavity tends to orient the fibers along the direction of the flow. By controlling the amount and direction of the flow, it is thus possible to influence the fibre orientation, having a quasi-isotropic material (low-flow moulding) or higher performances in a desired direction (high-flow moulding).

During the manufacturing phase, it is also important to avoid, when possible, defects like weld- lines. Weld lines occur when two flow fronts of material meet during the filling of a mold cavity. This can sometimes result in air entrapment, inhibited crosslinking in the polymer matrix, or the clumping or absence of fibers. For these reasons weld-lines can be as weak or weaker than the neat polymer resin.

== Material properties ==
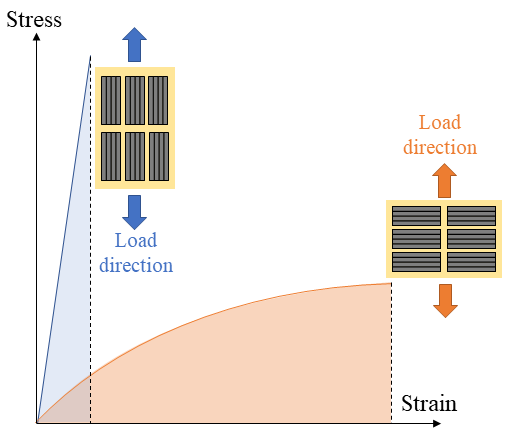
Different behaviour, in terms of stress strain curve, of CF-SMC according to the orientation of the tows. In the picture are shown the two (irrealistic) extreme cases of the tows perfectly aligned parallel or perpendicular to load direction.

Due to their heterogeneous and anisotropic microstructure, mechanical properties of CF-SMC can vary significantly within broad ranges. Parameters having profound impact on these materials performances are mainly related to the fibres and matrix neat mechanical and geometrical properties (especially those of the fibres) and the orientation and content of the reinforcement. Modulus can vary from less than 20 GPa to 60 GPa, while strength values are within 60–500 MPa.

CF-SMC can also be engineered, to some extent, to have better performances in a specific direction, in a similar fashion as continuous fibres composites. This can be achieved by carefully controlling the compression moulding stage to influence fibre orientation. When the fibres are mainly aligned with the loading direction, the material behaviour is mainly dominated by that of the fibres, thus resulting in stronger and stiffer, but also more brittle response. In the opposite case, if fibres tend to dispose perpendicular to the loading direction, the resin contributes more to the load bearing, and the overall composite will be less stiff, less strong and more ductile. Being based on hydrodynamic transport phenomena, however, the control over fibre orientation in CF-SMC is much more limited than in the continuous composites case, where orientation is often directly determined accurately by the manufacturer. In addition, while continuous fibres composites have a specific orientation, short fibre reinforced plastics can have a preferential orientation, meaning that, considering a generic system of axis, the majority of fibres can have a higher component along a direction and a lower component along the other two axes.

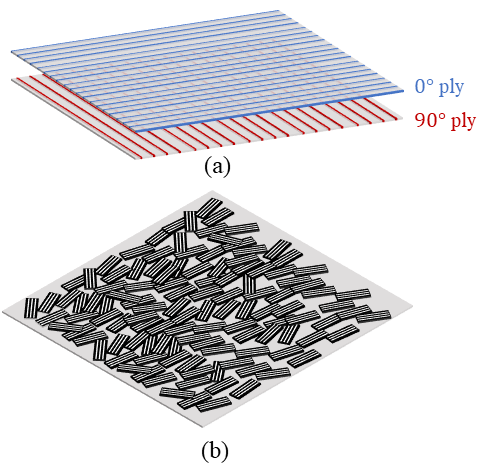
Comparison of the accurate fibre orientation in a laminate of UD plies (a) and the preferential orientation achievable with CF-SMC (b)

The discontinuous tow-based microstructure of these materials makes is even more heterogeneous than standard composites: fibre ends themselves acts as stress concentration areas for both the resin and the neighbouring tows; moreover, especially for complex shaped parts, it is impossible to prevent some local spots with badly aligned tows (e.g. perpendicular to the direction of axial stress) or with low fibre volume content, like resin pockets. Although making the material weaker and the structural design more complex, this feature makes these materials quite notch-insensitive.

When moulded, CFSMC has a very different appearance than traditional carbon fibre fabric composites, which traditionally appear with a woven checkerboard pattern. CFSMC has the appearance of black and grey marble or burl.

== Industrial use ==
CF SMC combines the lightweight properties of carbon composites with a manufacturing process, as compression moulding, that allows fast manufacturing and thus is suitable for high volume industrial applications. For these reasons, the automotive industry is one of the best candidates for this technology.

Car manufacturers have used standard glass SMC for over 30 years as a material for body panels in select sport cars such as the Chevrolet Corvette. Substituting glass fibres with carbon is a recent development, having been used for significant structural components of the 2003 Dodge Viper, the multifunctional spare wheel pan of Mercedes-AMG E-Class, the Mercedes-Benz SLR McLaren, the 2009 Lexus LFA, 2015 Lamborghini Huracán, the 2017 BMW 7 series and 2017 McLaren chassis. Lamborghini (together with Callaway Golf Company) patented an advanced version of CF-SMC called Forged Composite. They first introduced it in the Sesto Elemento concept car, and since then, Forged Composite has been a distinctive mark for Lamborghini cars, used both in structural and aesthetical purposes. CF-SMC use is recently spreading also to the much broader non-high performance automotive sector as for the 2017 Toyota Prius PHV.

CF-SMC has also been used in the aeronautic industry by Boeing, for the 787 Dreamliner window frames, while producers suggest that the use of these materials will grow in this sector as well.
