= Sheet moulding compound =

Polyester material

Sheet moulding compound (SMC) or sheet moulding composite is a ready to mould glass-fibre reinforced polyester material primarily used in compression moulding. The sheet is provided in rolls weighing up to 1000 kg. Alternatively the resin and related materials may be mixed on site when a producer wants greater control over the chemistry and filler.

SMC is both a process and a reinforced composite material. This is manufactured by dispersing long strands (usually >1”) of chopped fiber, commonly glass fibers or carbon fibers on a bath of thermoset resin (typically polyester resin, vinyl ester resin or epoxy resin). The longer fibers in SMC result in better strength properties than standard bulk moulding compound (BMC) products. Typical applications include demanding electrical applications, corrosion resistant needs, structural components at low cost, automotive, and transit.

== Process ==
Paste reservoir dispenses a measured amount of specified resin paste onto a plastic carrier film. This carrier film passes underneath a chopper which cuts the fibers onto the surface. Once these have drifted through the depth of resin paste, another sheet is added on top which sandwiches the glass. The sheets are compacted and then enter onto a take-up roll, which is used to store the product whilst it matures. The carrier film is then later removed and the material is cut into charges. Depending on what shape is required determines the shape of the charge and steel die which it is then added to. Heat and pressure act on the charge and once fully cured, this is then removed from the mould as the finished product. Fillers both reduce weight and change the physical properties, typically adding strength. Production challenges include wetting the filler, which could consist of glass microspheres or aligned fibers rather than random chopped fibers; adjusting die temperature and pressure to provide the proper geometry; and adjusting chemistry to end use.

== Advantages ==
Compared to similar methods, SMC benefits from a very high volume production ability, excellent part reproducibility, it is cost effective as low labor requirements per production level is very good and industry scrap is reduced substantially. Weight reduction, due to lower dimensional requirements and because of the ability to consolidate many parts into one, is also advantageous. The level of flexibility also exceeds many counterpart processes.

== Physical properties ==
Properties vary depending upon filler and resin types, with compounds using aligned fibers (especially long fibers) being subject to greater anisotropy. Typical ranges are listed below.

Density	1.1–2.0 g/cm^{3} (69–125 lb/cu ft)
Impact Strength	4–11 J/cm (7–21 ft⋅lbf/in)
Flexural Strength	120–230 MPa (17–33 ksi)
Flexural Modulus	10–15 GPa (1,500–2,200 ksi)
Tensile Strength	55–125 MPa (8–18 ksi)
Tensile Modulus	7–14 GPa (1,000–2,000 ksi)
Compressive Strength	130–220 MPa (19–32 ksi)
Heat Deflection Temperature at 1.82 MPa (264 psi)	200–260 °C (392–500 °F)
Heat Deflection Temperature at 0.455 MPa (66 psi)	115–180 °C (239–356 °F)
Curing Temperature	80–150 °C (176–302 °F)

== See also ==
- Bulk moulding compound
- Fiberglass
- Fibre-reinforced plastic
- Thermosetting polymer
- Thermoset polymer matrix
- Forged composite
- CFSMC
