= Mitsubishi Rayon =

Japanese textile company

Logo

Mitsubishi Rayon Co., Ltd. (三菱レイヨン株式会社, Mitsubishi Reiyon Kabushiki-gaisha) (est. August 31, 1933) is a Japanese textile company that manufactures chemicals, plastics, and fibers. It is Japan's biggest acrylic fiber maker. In 2010, it became a wholly owned subsidiary of Mitsubishi Chemical Holdings.

In addition to the primary acrylic fiber, Mitsubishi Rayon also is one of the top makers of golf shafts, now largely popular on the PGA and European Tours now gaining popularity by consumers. Current Success in the shaft market includes the making of new golf clubs by brands such as Ping (golf), Callaway Golf, Nike, Titleist, and TaylorMade sold manufactured with a Mitsubishi Rayon shaft.
