= Lamborghini Murciélago =

Sports car produced by Lamborghini

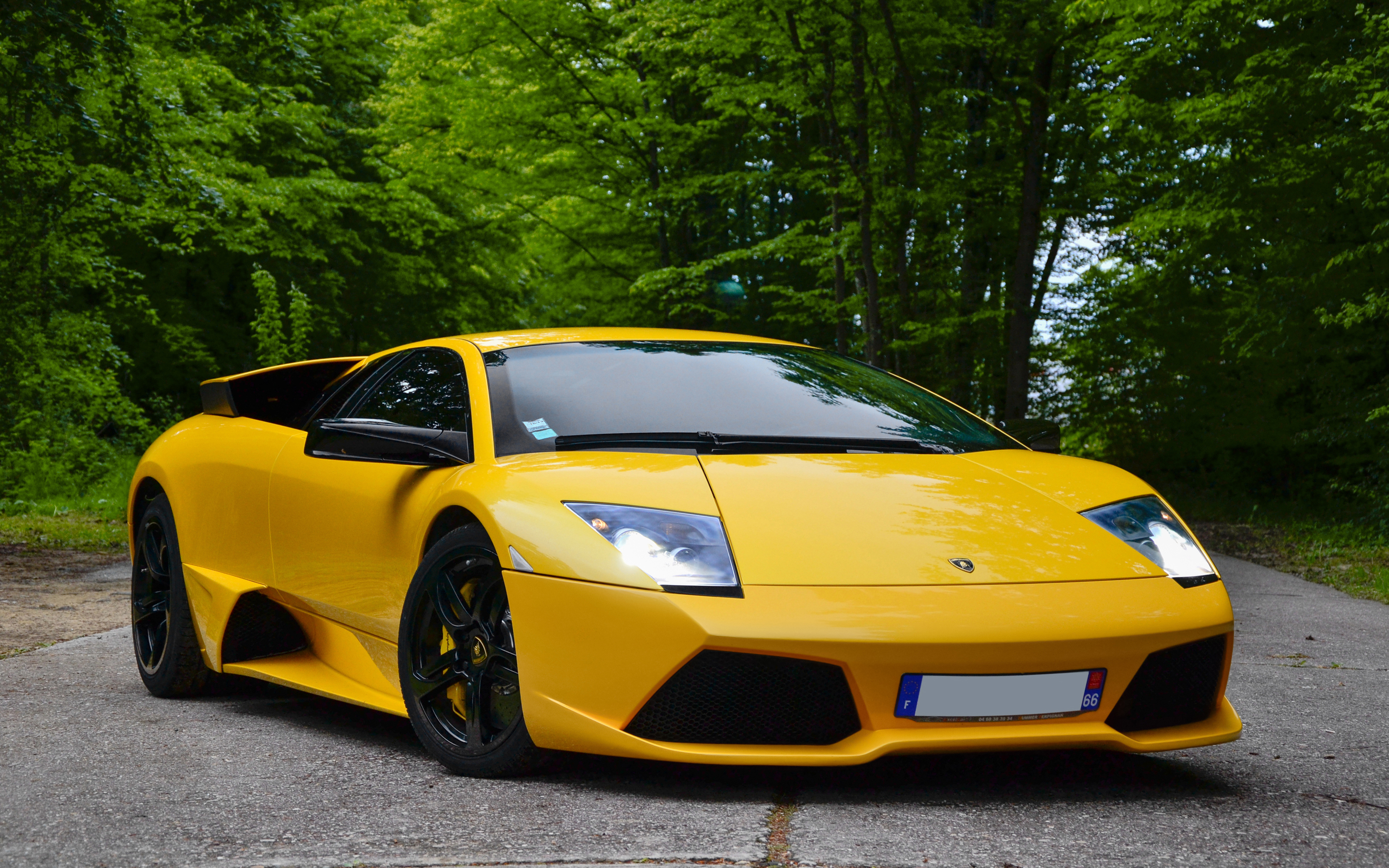
- Lamborghini Murciélago LP 640

Overview
- Manufacturer: Lamborghini
- Production: 2001–2010; 4,099 produced
- Model years: 2002–2010
- Assembly: Italy: Sant'Agata Bolognese
- Designer: Luc Donckerwolke (original design); Filippo Perini at Lamborghini Style Center (facelift)

Body and chassis
- Class: Sports car (S)
- Body style: 2-door coupé; 2-door roadster
- Layout: Longitudinal, mid-engine, all wheel drive
- Doors: Scissor
- Related: Lamborghini Reventón

Powertrain
- Engine: 6.2 L–6.5 L Lamborghini V12
- Power output: 427 kW (581 PS; 573 hp) (2001–2005); 471 kW (640 PS; 632 hp) (2006–2010); 478 kW (650 PS; 641 hp) (LP 650-4 roadster); 493 kW (670 PS; 661 hp) (LP 670-4 SV)
- Transmission: 6-speed manual; 6-speed e-gear automated manual

Dimensions
- Wheelbase: 2,665 mm (104.9 in)
- Length: 2002–05: 4,580 mm (180.3 in); 2006–10: 4,610 mm (181.5 in)
- Width: 2002–05: 2,045 mm (80.5 in); 2006–10: 2,057 mm (81.0 in)
- Height: 1,135 mm (44.7 in)
- Curb weight: 1,841 kg (4,058 lb); 1,860 kg (4,100 lb) Roadster; 1,746 kg (3,850 lb) LP 640; 1,860 kg (4,100 lb) LP 640 Roadster; 1,746 kg (3,850 lb) LP 670-4 SV

Chronology
- Predecessor: Lamborghini Diablo
- Successor: Lamborghini Aventador

The Lamborghini Murciélago is a sports car produced by Italian automotive manufacturer Lamborghini between 2001 and 2010. The successor to the Diablo and flagship V12 of the automaker's lineup, the Murciélago was introduced as a coupé in 2001. The car was first available in North America for the 2002 model year. The Murciélago was Lamborghini's first new design in eleven years and was also the brand's first new model under the ownership of German parent company Audi, which is owned by the Volkswagen Group. The car is designed by Peruvian-born Belgian Luc Donckerwolke, Lamborghini's head of design from 1998 to 2005.

A roadster variant was introduced in 2003, followed by the more powerful and updated LP 640 coupé and roadster and a limited edition LP 650–4 Roadster. The final variation to wear the Murciélago nameplate was the LP 670–4 SuperVeloce, powered by the largest and final evolution of the original Lamborghini V12 engine. Production of the Murciélago ended on 5 November 2010, with a total production run of 4,099 cars. Its successor, the Aventador, was unveiled at the 2011 Geneva Motor Show.

== Name ==
Lamborghini cars are often named after Spanish Fighting Bulls; the eponymous Murciélago was a leading sire after surviving an 1879 fight in Córdoba. Murciélago is the Spanish word for bat. In the Castilian Spanish spoken in most of Spain the word is pronounced [muɾˈθjelaɣo], with a voiceless dental fricative [θ] (as in English thing). However, the Italian automaker often uses the Southern Spanish and Hispanic American pronunciation, [muɾˈsjelaɣo], with an [s] sound.

== Variants ==
=== Murciélago (2001–2006) ===
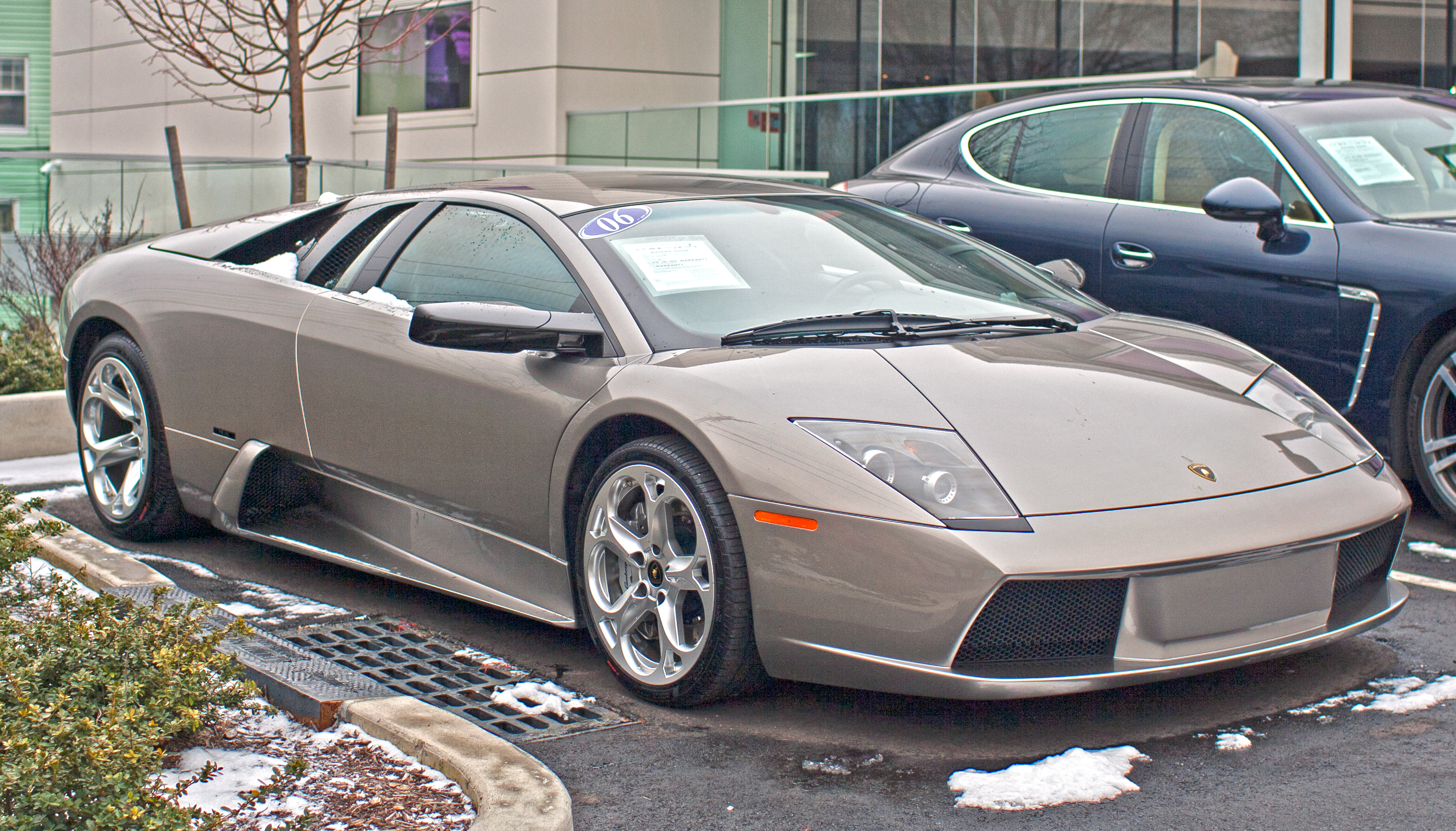
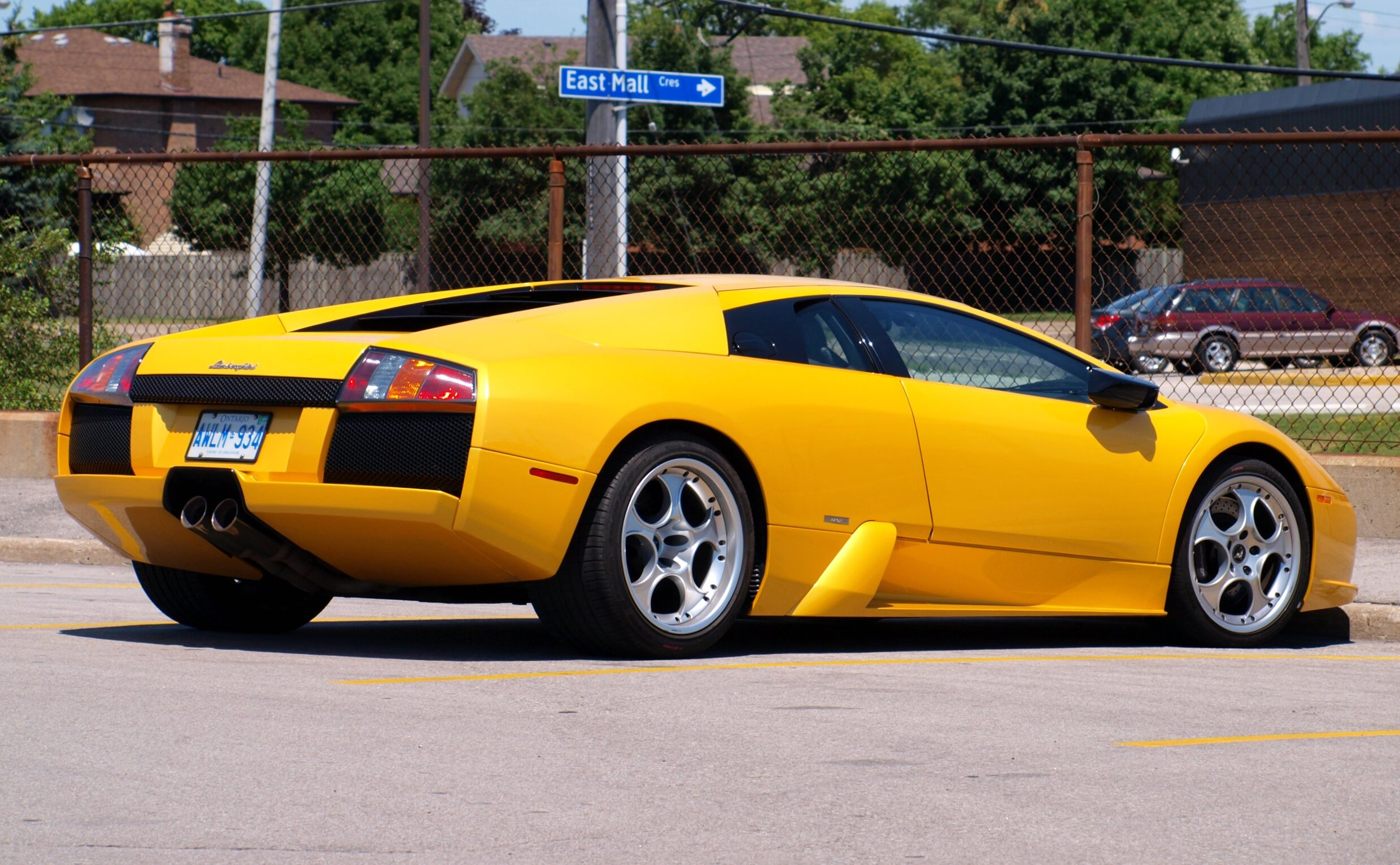
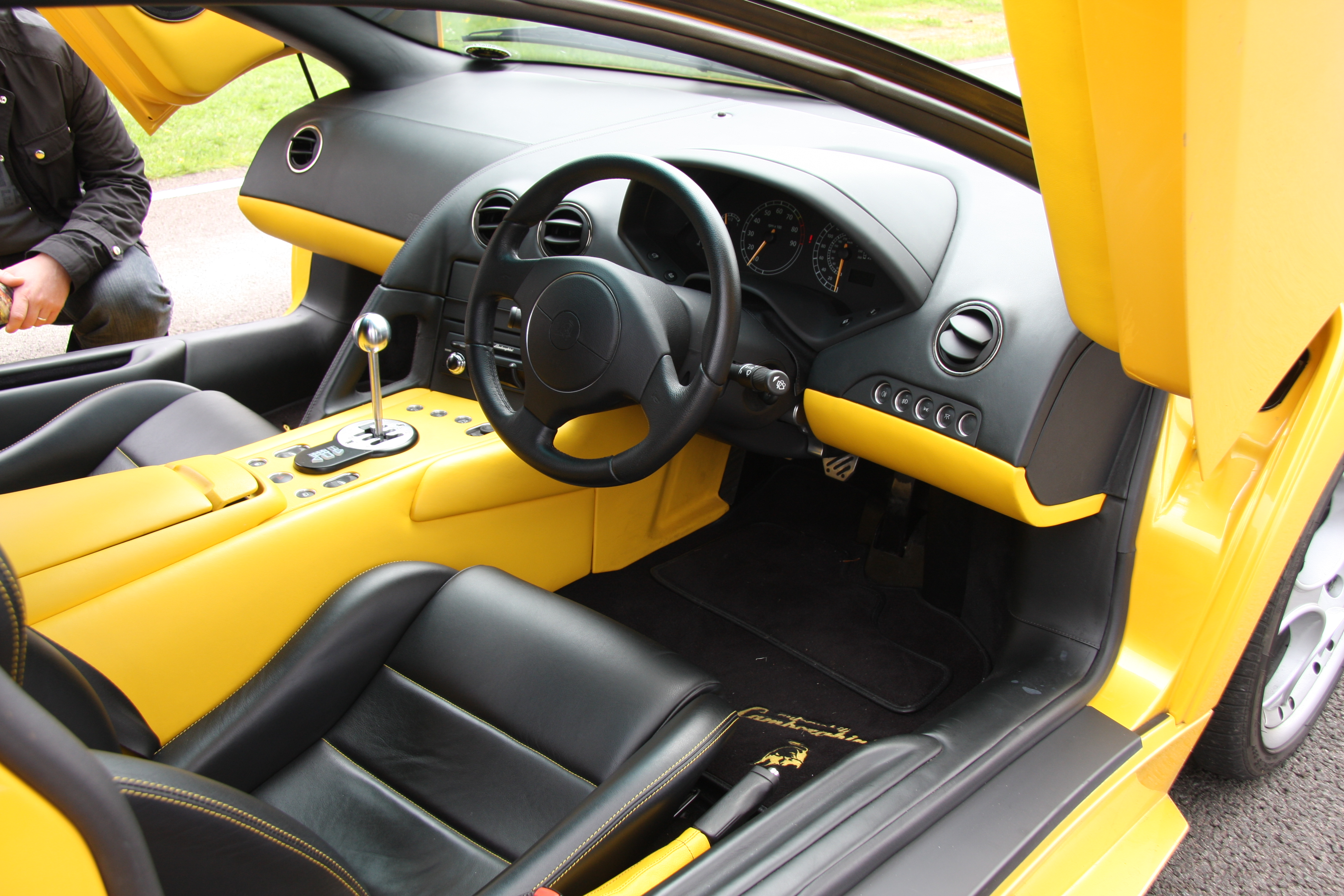
Murciélago coupé

The Murciélago is an all-wheel drive, mid-engine sports car. With an angular design and a low slung body, the highest point of the roof is just under 4 feet (1.2 m) above the ground. One of the vehicle's most distinguishing features is its scissor doors, a hallmark feature of flagship Lamborghini models since the Countach. The first generation of the Murciélago was produced between 2001 and 2006 and was powered by a Lamborghini V12 that traces its roots back to the company's beginnings in the 1960s. The rear differential is integrated with the engine itself, with a viscous coupling centre differential transferring power to the front wheels. The total power distribution is 70 percent at the rear and 30 percent at the front. Power is delivered through a 6-speed manual transmission. The suspension utilised in the car uses an independent double-wishbone design, and the bodywork mostly features carbon fibre except for the steel roof and aluminium scissor doors. The active rear wing and the active air intakes integrated into the car's shoulders are electromechanically controlled, deploying automatically only at high speeds in an effort to maximise both aerodynamic and cooling efficiency. The interior was also made more comfortable and ergonomic than its predecessor sporting a simple and clean look with all the major controls along with the gearshift knob integrated into the central tunnel.

The first generation cars were known simply as Murciélago. The 6,192 cc (6.2 L; 377.9 cu in) naturally aspirated V12 engine installed in the first generation cars generated a maximum power output of 580 PS (572 hp; 427 kW) at 7,500 rpm and 650 N⋅m (479 lb⋅ft) of torque at 5,400 rpm, accelerating the car from a stand still to 100 km/h (62 mph) in 3.8 seconds and on to a top speed of 333 km/h (207 mph). Subsequent versions incorporated an alphanumeric designation to the name Murciélago, which indicated their engine orientation and output. However, the original Murciélago is never referred to as "LP 580".

=== Murciélago Roadster (2004–2006) ===
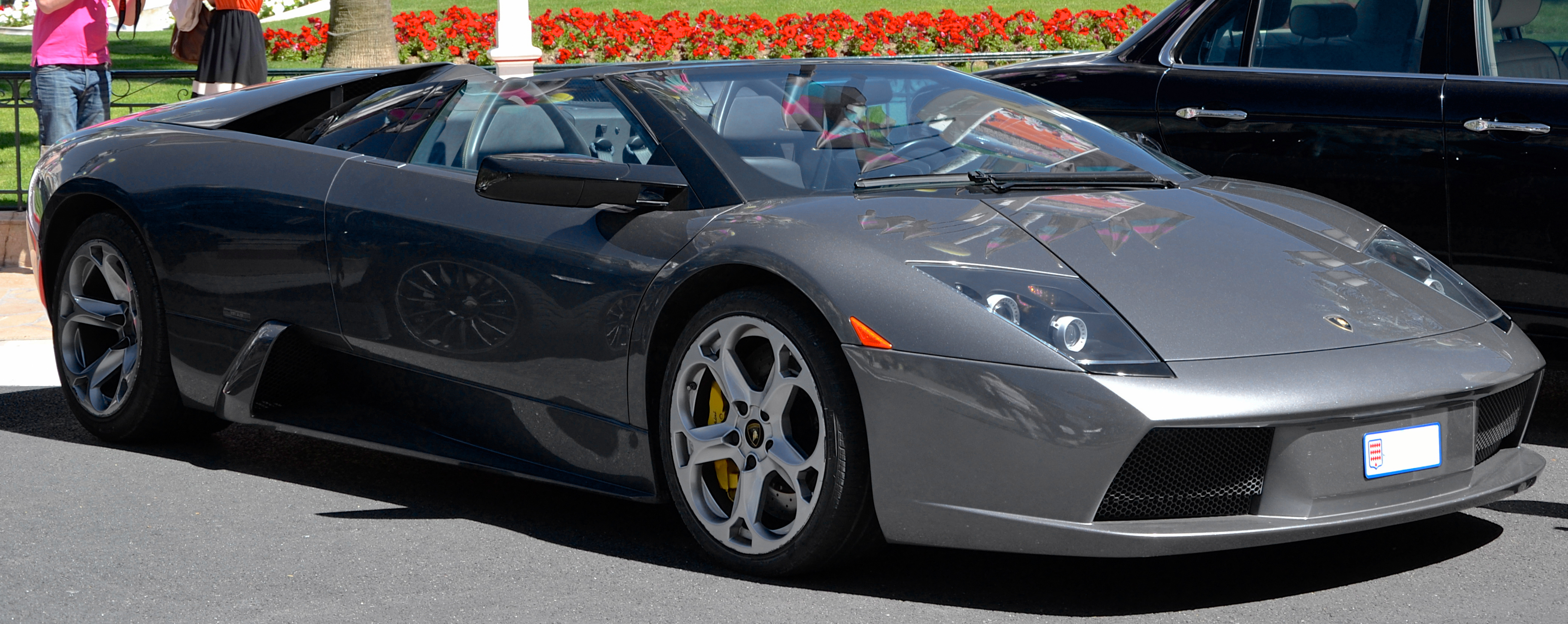
Murciélago Roadster

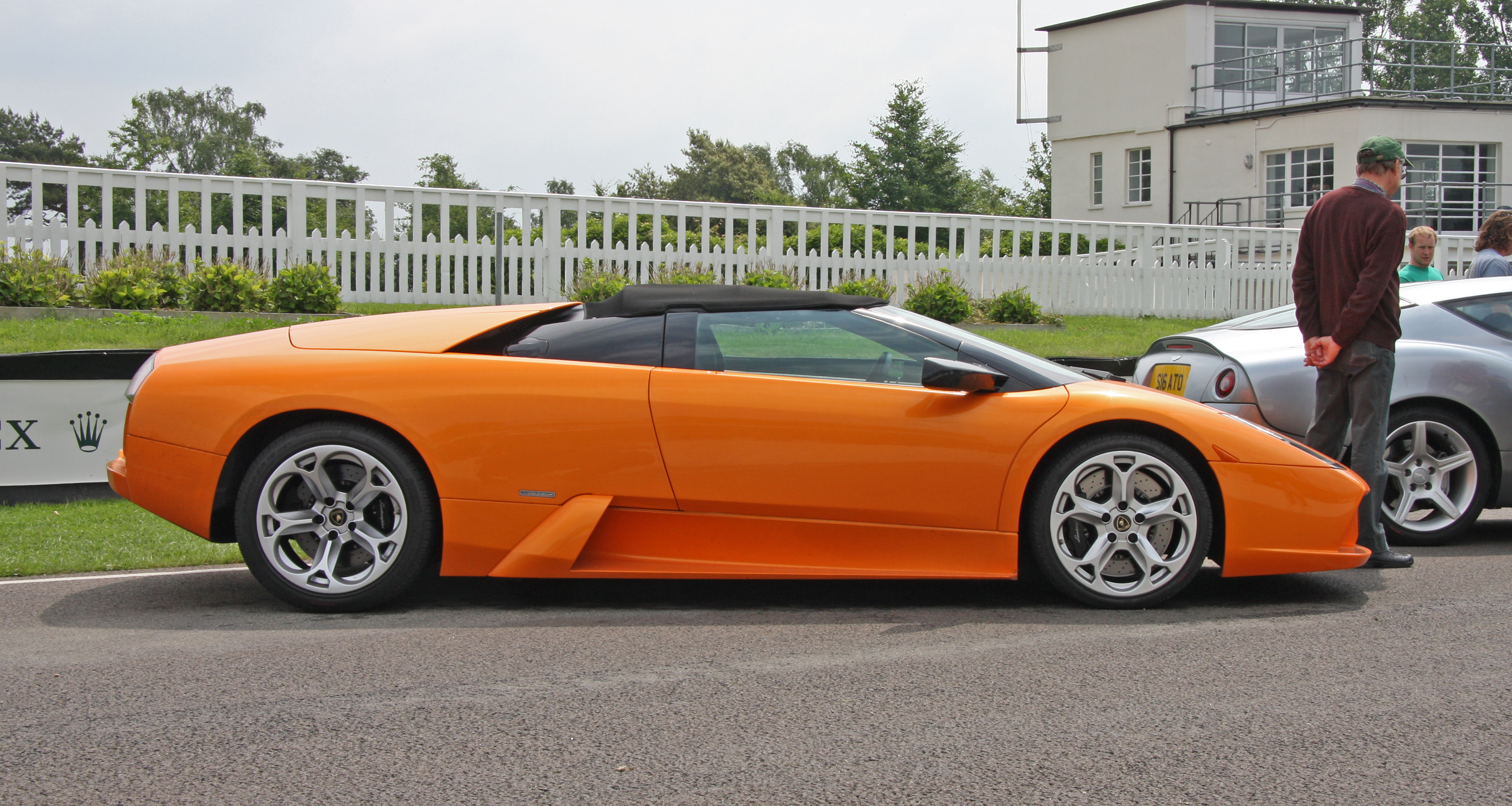
Murciélago Roadster side view with the top in place

The concept car of the upcoming open-top variant was presented at the 2003 Detroit Motor Show as the Murciélago Barchetta. The production version called the Murciélago Roadster was introduced in 2004. Primarily designed to be an open-top car, it employed a manually attached soft roof as a cover from adverse weather, but a warning on the windshield header advised the driver not to exceed 100 mph (160 km/h) with the roof in place. The roof which was made of fabric could be folded and fit into a leather bag supplied with the car in order to store it in the front compartment when not in use. The designer, Luc Donckerwolke used the B-2 stealth bomber, the Wally 118 WallyPower yacht, and architect Santiago Calatrava's Ciutat de Les Arts i Les Ciències in Valencia, Spain as his inspiration for the roadster's revised rear pillars and engine cover. The roadster weighs 29 kg (65 lb) more than the coupé due to the loss of the roof and the addition of chassis reinforcing components. The roadster could accelerate from 0–97 km/h (0–60 mph) in 3.8 seconds which is more than the coupé owing to the increased weight while the top speed remained the same as the coupé.

=== Murciélago LP 640 (2006–2010) ===
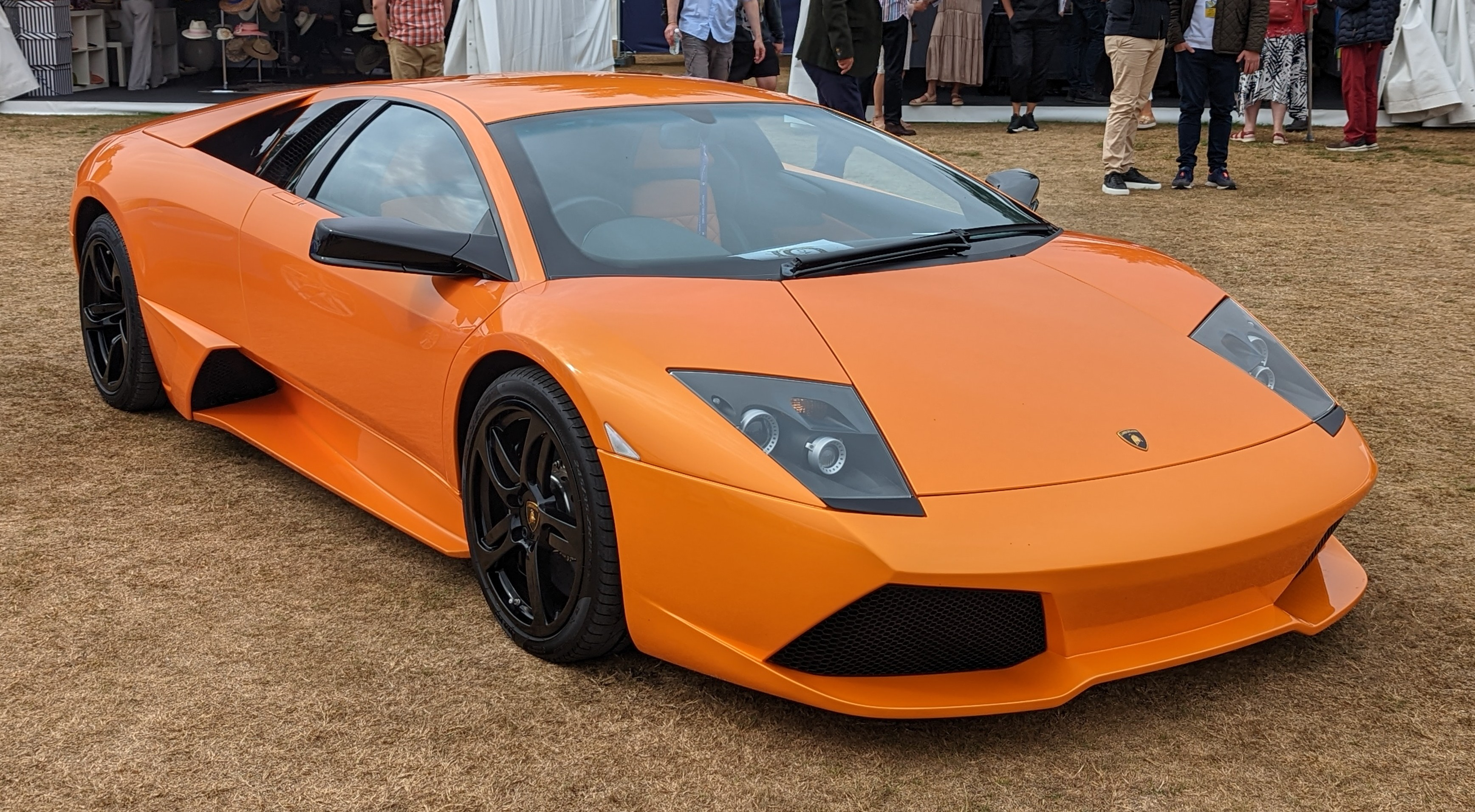

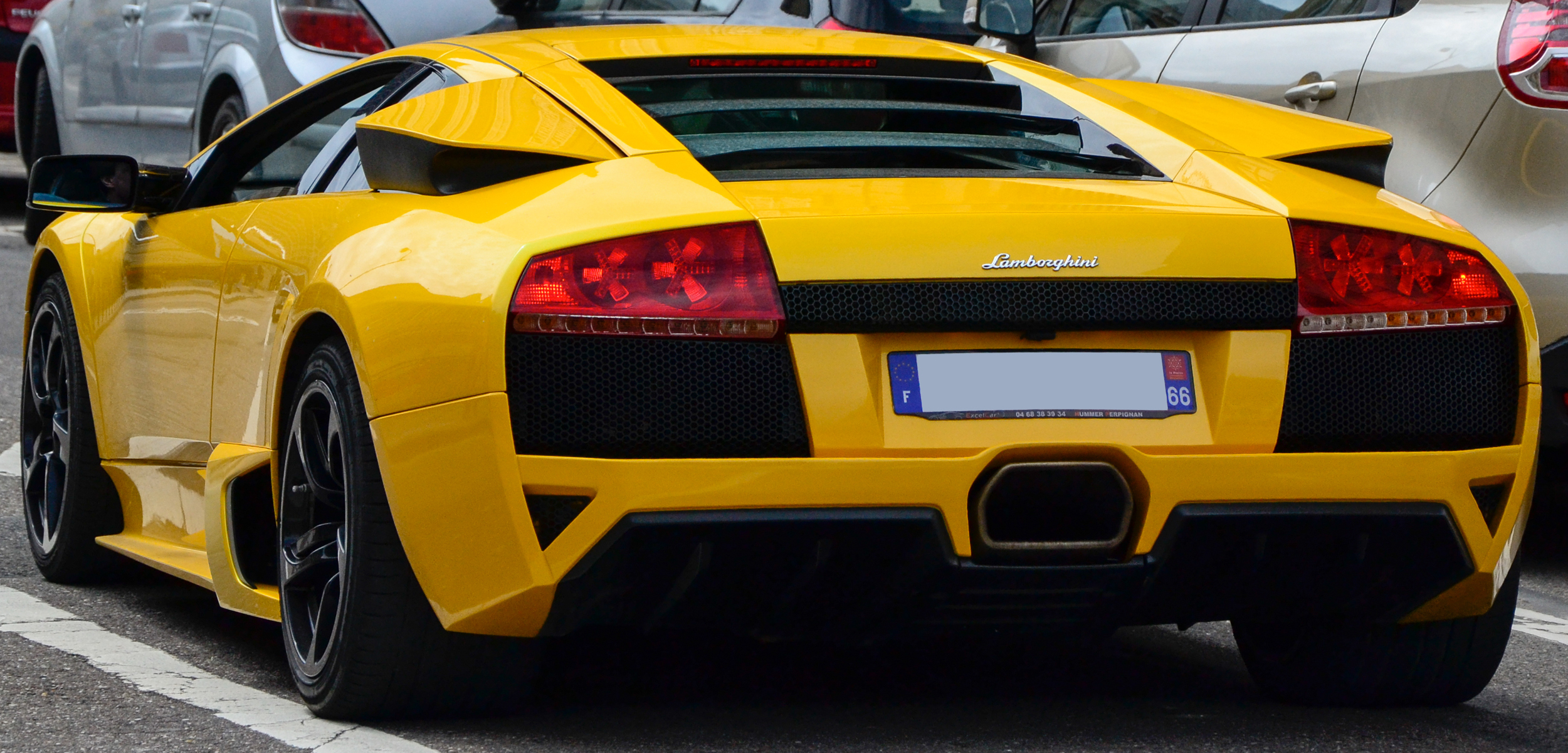
Murciélago LP 640

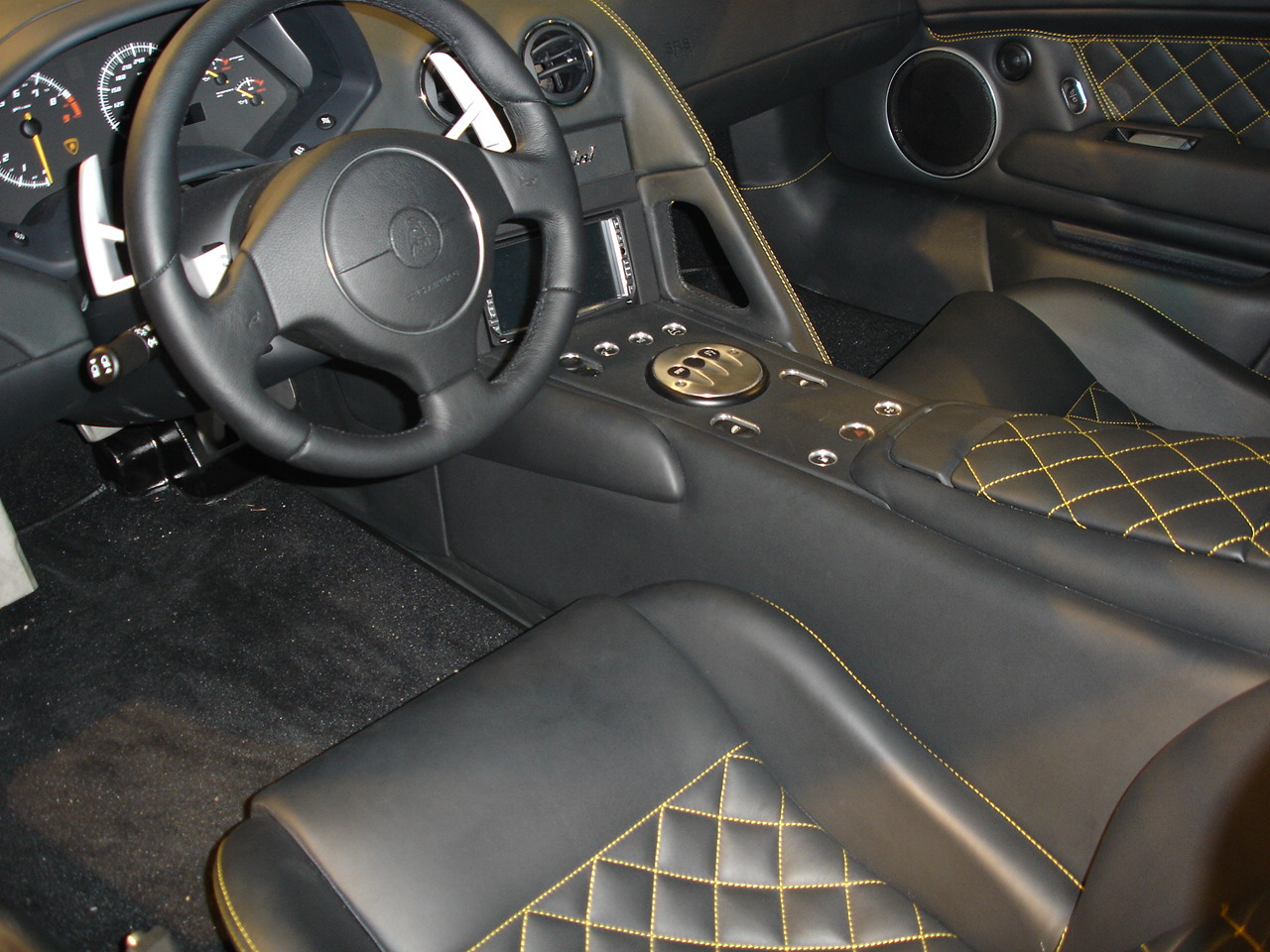
Interior with the newly introduced paddle shift semi-automatic transmission

In March 2006, Lamborghini unveiled an updated version of the Murciélago at the Geneva Motor Show: the Murciélago LP 640. The new title incorporated the car's name, along with an alphanumeric designation which indicated the engine's orientation (Longitudinale Posteriore), and the updated power output. With displacement now increased to 6.5 litres, the engine was rated at 640 PS (471 kW; 631 hp) at 8,000 rpm. The exterior received a noticeable facelift, featuring revised front and rear fascias, and asymmetrical side air intakes, with the left side intake feeding an oil cooler. A new single outlet exhaust system incorporated into the rear diffuser, modified suspension system, revised programming, and upgraded clutch for the 6-speed "e-Gear" automated manual transmission with launch control rounded out the performance modifications. Interior seating was also re-configured in order to provide greater headroom, and a new stereo system formed part of the updated dashboard. Optional equipment included Carbon fibre-reinforced Silicon Carbide (C/SiC) ceramic composite brakes, chrome paddle shifters and a glass engine cover. The car's estimated fuel economy for the 6-speed manual variant is 8 miles per U.S. gallon (29 L/100 km; 9.6 mpg_{‑imp}) in the city and 13 miles per U.S. gallon (18 L/100 km; 16 mpg_{‑imp}) on the highway, making it the least efficient car in 2008 for city and highway driving, according to the EPA.

=== Murciélago LP 640 Roadster (2006–2010) ===
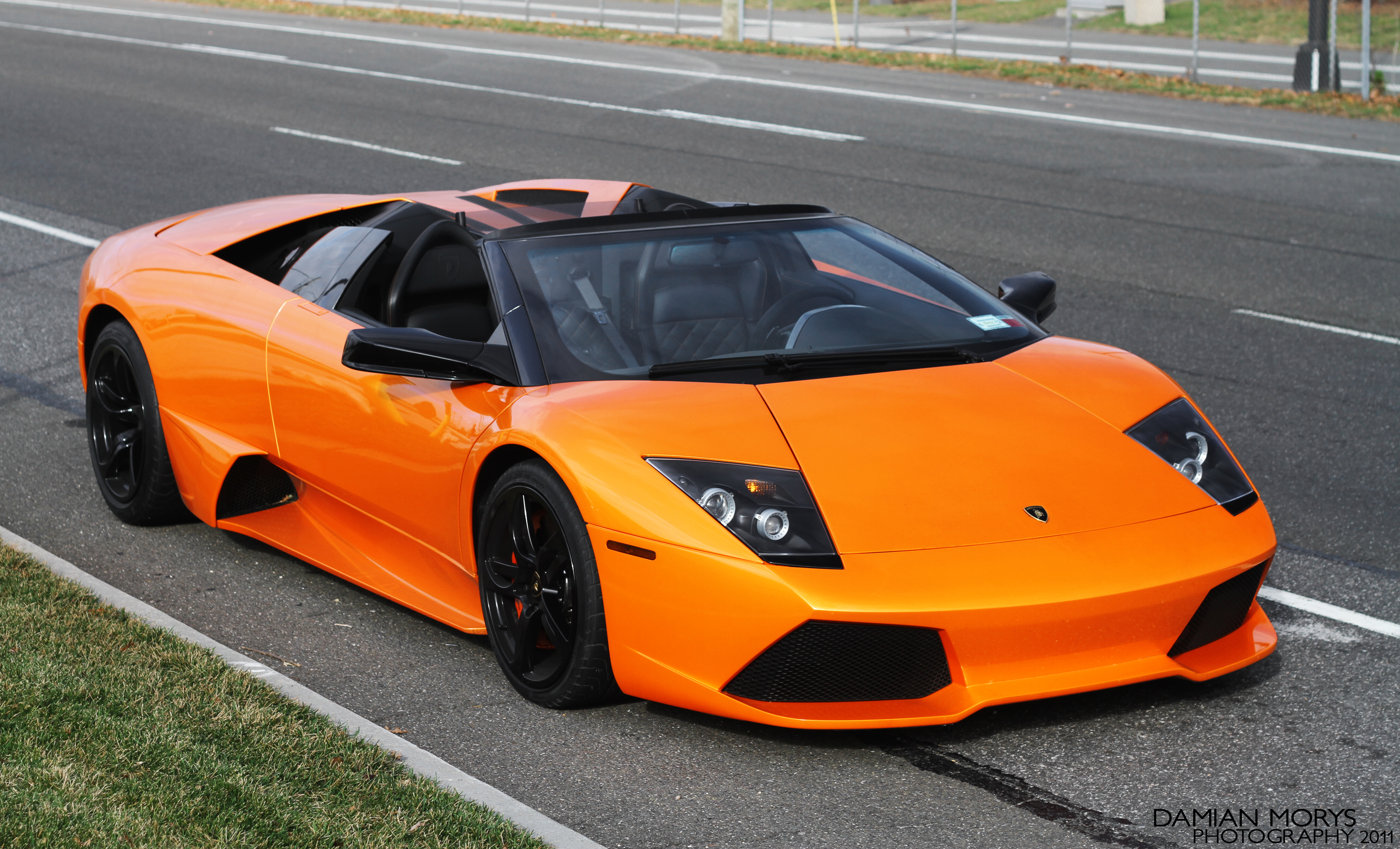
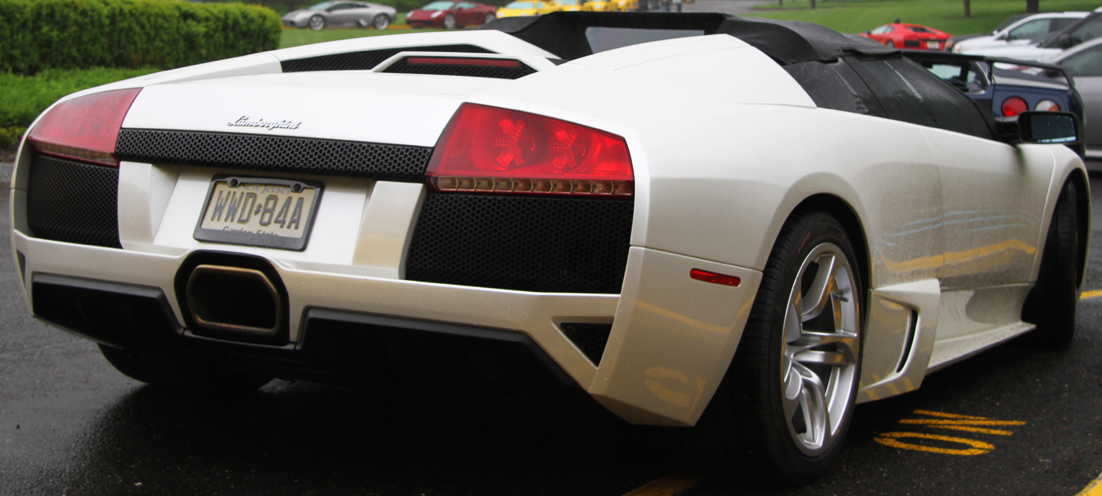
Murciélago LP 640 roadster

At the 2006 Los Angeles Auto Show, Lamborghini announced that the roadster version of the Murciélago would also be updated to LP 640 specifications. One of the most rare of all the LP640 Roadster derivatives is the LP640 in right-hand-drive guise with a manual transmission. A rumoured five of these are said to exist worldwide.

=== Murciélago LP 670–4 SuperVeloce (2009–2010) ===
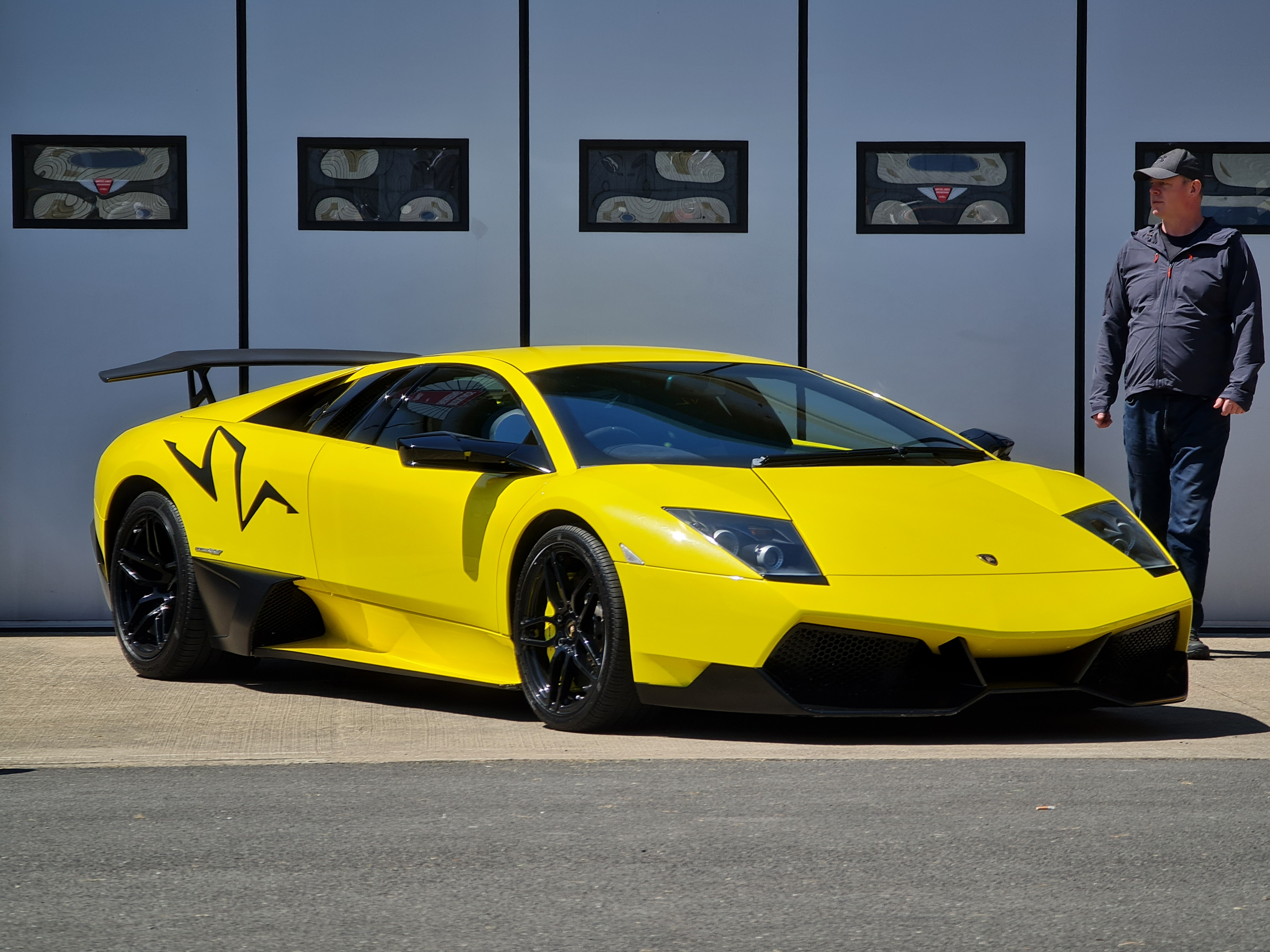
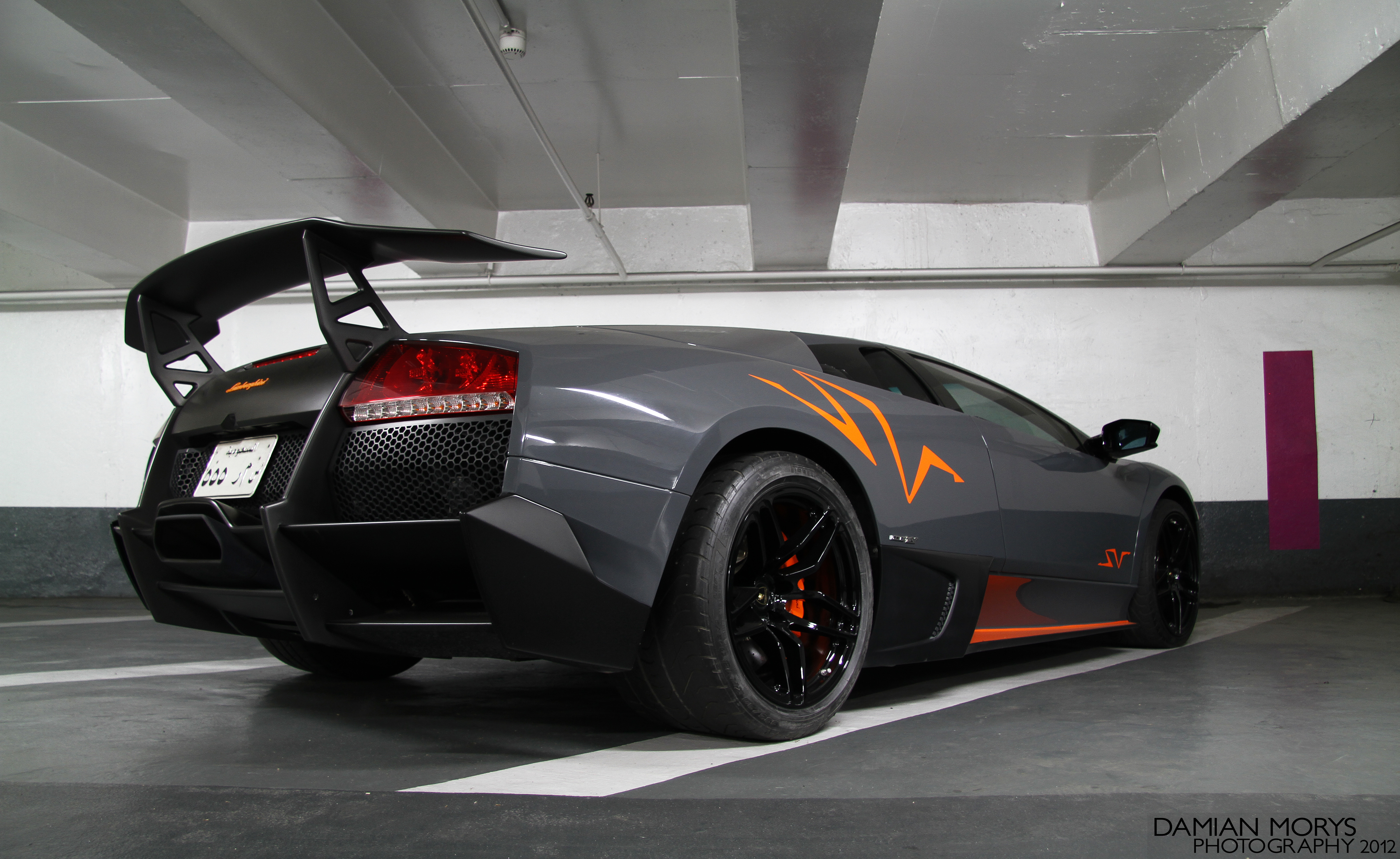
Murciélago LP 670–4 Super Veloce front and rear view

At the 2009 Geneva Motor Show, Lamborghini unveiled a high performance variant of the Murciélago, the LP 670–4 SuperVeloce. The SV moniker had previously appeared on the Diablo SV, as well as the Miura SV. The SV variants are more track-oriented than the normal production variants and are usually produced in limited numbers.

The SuperVeloce's 6,496 cc (6.5 L; 396.4 cu in) V12 engine generates a maximum power output of 670 PS (493 kW; 661 hp) at 8,000 rpm and 660 N⋅m (487 lb⋅ft) of torque at 6,500 rpm, due to revised valve timing and an upgraded intake system. The air intakes were made bigger for better brake cooling and the front spoiler extended much farther for improved downforce. The engine cover was specially designed for the SV and consisted of three hexagonal plexiglass plates supported by a carbon fibre framework. The car's weight was also reduced by 100 kg (220 lb) through the extensive use of carbon fibre inside and out. A new, lighter exhaust system also helps in saving weight. The interior was also trimmed in Alcantara as a weight saving measure. As a result of the extensive weight loss, the SV has a power-to-weight ratio of 429 hp/long ton. The LP 640's optional 15-inch carbon-ceramic disc brakes with 6 piston callipers came as standard equipment with the car. In its June 2009 issue, Car and Driver magazine estimated that the LP 670–4 SV is capable of accelerating to 60 mph (97 km/h) from a standing start in 3.0 seconds and on to 100 mph (161 km/h) in 7.2 seconds. Subsequent testing by Road & Track revealed a 0–60 mph (0–97 km/h) time of 3.1 seconds and a quarter mile time of 10.9 seconds at 129.4 mph (208.2 km/h). Lamborghini claimed a top speed of 342 km/h (213 mph) when the car is fitted with an optional smaller spoiler, or 337 km/h (209 mph) with the standard Aeropack spoiler.

According to Maurizio Reggiani, head of Lamborghini R&D at the time, the LP 670–4 SV's steering was tuned for high-speed sensitivity. The original production plan of the ultimate Murciélago was limited to 350 cars. However, an Instagram page known as "@murcielagosv.registry" has been tracking the exact number of LP 670-4s and as of 2025 there have been 268 units found so far. The initial plan of 350 units was scrapped due to the factory requiring to make room for the Aventador's assembly line which is the Murciélago's successor. The chassis numbers of the total cars manufactured do not represent manufacturing order.

== Limited editions ==
=== 40th Anniversary Edition ===
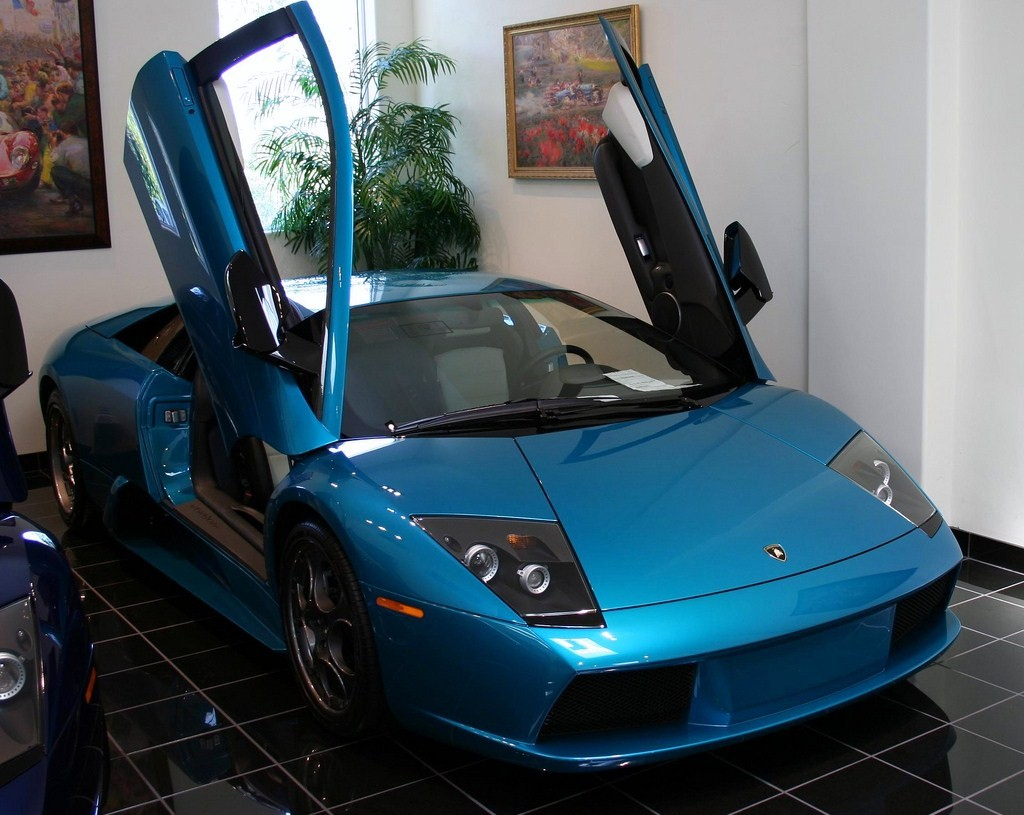
Murciélago 40th Anniversary Edition

In 2003, Lamborghini celebrated its 40th anniversary by introducing a limited production run of fifty 40th-Anniversary Edition Murciélagos. Enhancements over the standard car included a limited-edition blue body color that was called "Verde Artemis", carbon-fibre exterior detailing, upgraded wheels, a revamped exhaust system, and a numbered plaque on the inside of the rear window. The interior also featured unique leather trim.

=== LP 640 Versace ===
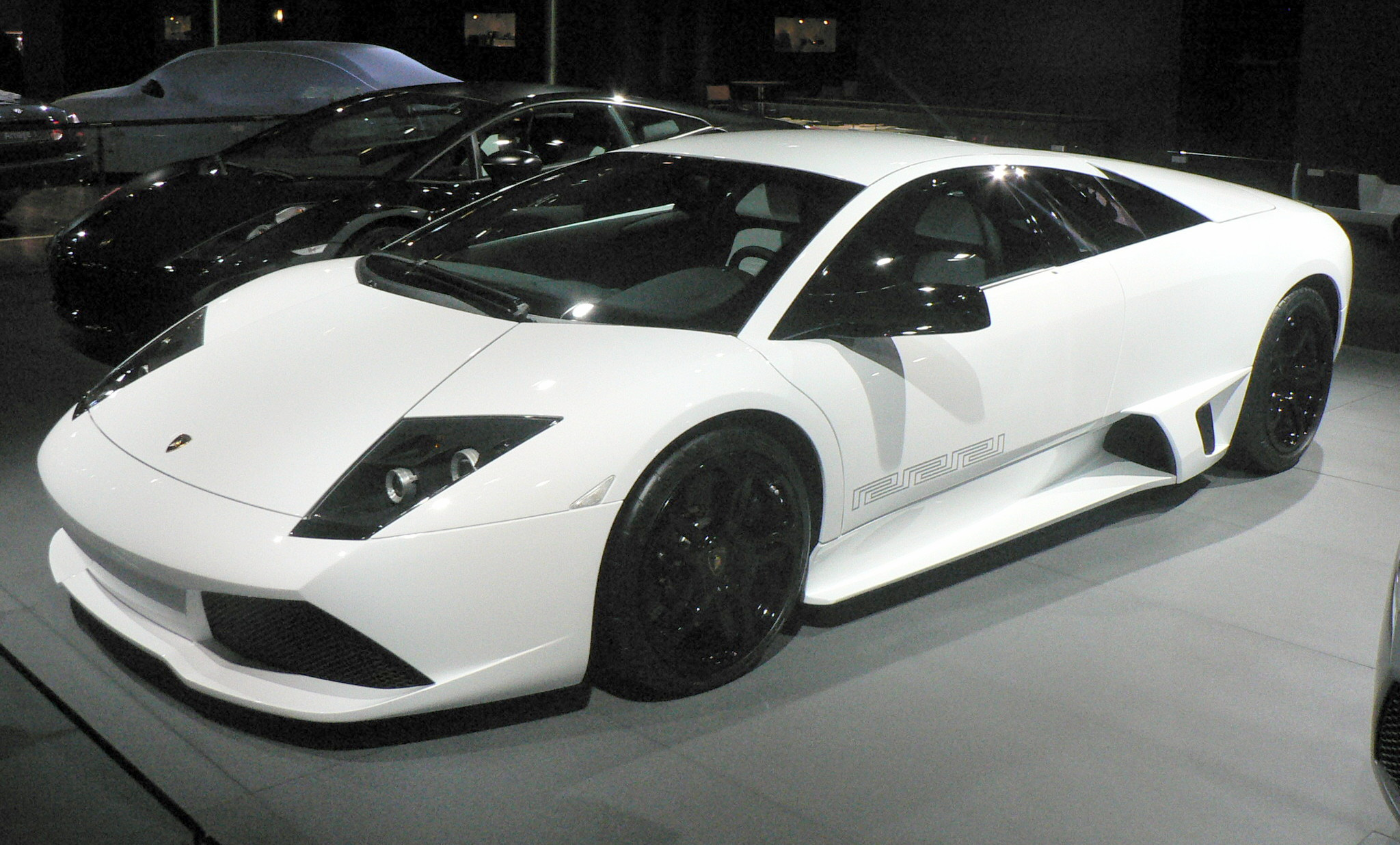
Murciélago LP-640 Versace

The Murciélago LP 640 Versace is a special limited edition of the LP 640 that was unveiled at the 2006 Paris Motor Show. Available in either white or black, 20 were produced as both coupés and roadsters but only 8 were available for sale. Although the standard V12 engine was used, stylists from the Versace fashion house, and Lamborghini's Ad Personam program, collaborated to design custom interiors finished in two-toned Versace leather complemented with a Gianni Versace logo plaque on the centre console. Each unit came with matching Versace luggage, along with driving shoes and gloves. A matching watch from Versace's Precious Items department was also made available to customers.

=== LP 650–4 Roadster ===
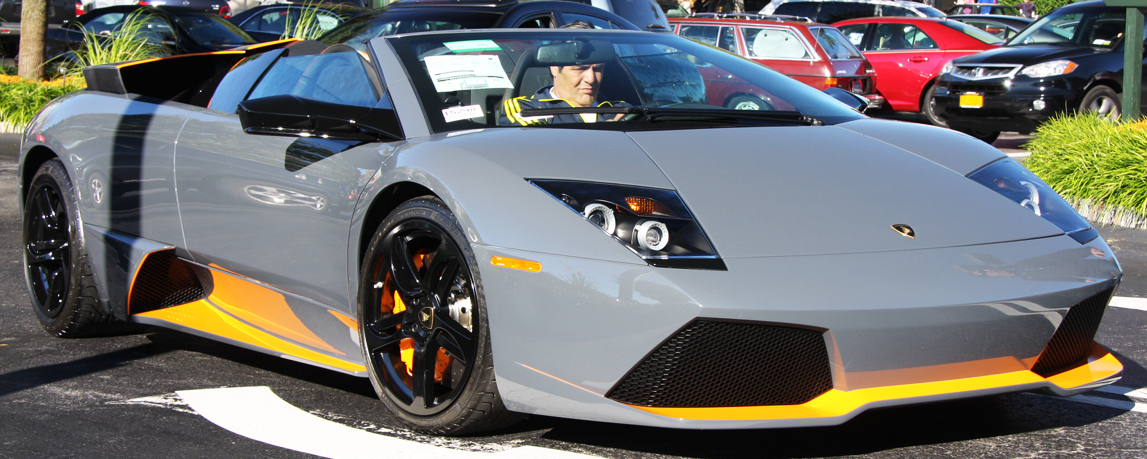
Murciélago LP 650-4 Roadster

In 2009, Lamborghini released a limited-run update of the Murciélago Roadster (50 units). The LP 650-4's increased engine output is rated at 650 PS (478 kW; 641 hp) and 660 N⋅m (487 lbf⋅ft), allowing the car to reach 100 km/h (62 mph) in 3.4 seconds and achieve a top speed of 330 km/h (205 mph). Available only in Grigio Telesto gray with Arancio orange highlights, the color scheme was continued on the inside.

=== LP 670–4 SuperVeloce China Limited Edition (2010) ===
The LP 670–4 SuperVeloce China Limited Edition is a limited version of the LP 670–4 SuperVeloce for the Chinese market. It is distinguished by the middle stripe. The vehicle, unveiled at the Beijing Auto Show, has a top speed of 345 km/h (214 mph) and produces 670 hp (500 kW; 679 PS) and 661 N⋅m (488 lb⋅ft) of torque, which propels it from 0–100 km/h (0–62 mph) in 3.2 seconds. Production was limited to 10 units.

== Safety recall ==
In May 2010 in the United States, Lamborghini recalled 428 of its 2007–2008 Murciélago coupés and roadsters because of the possibility of weld failure on the fuel pump support inside the fuel tank, potentially leading to a fuel leak and possible fire.

== Specifications ==
=== Engines ===
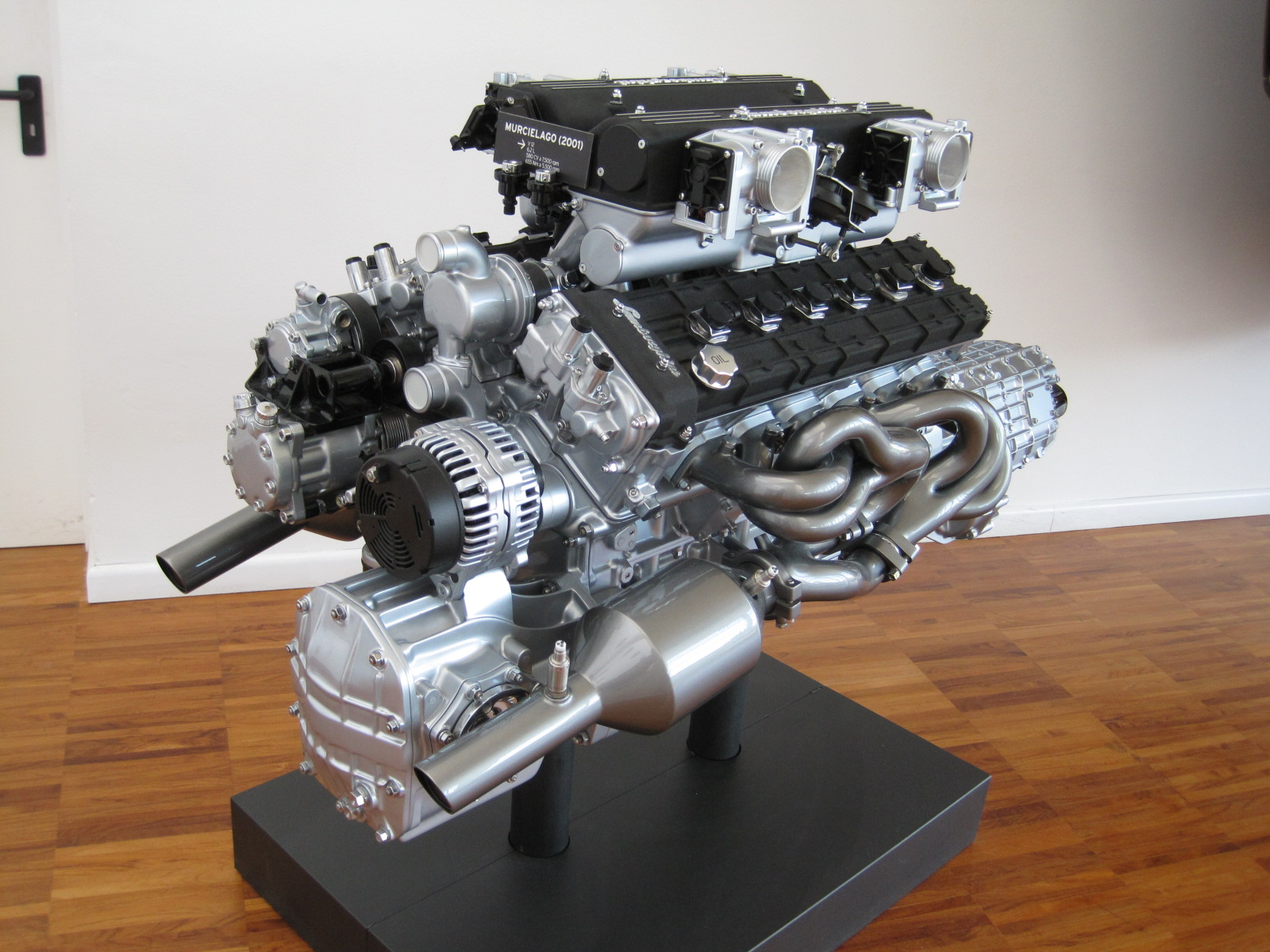
The 6.2-litre V12 engine used in the Murciélago

Model	Engine	Power and torque	Acceleration (seconds)				Top speed
Model	Engine	Power and torque	0–97 km/h (0–60 mph)	0–160 km/h (0–100 mph)	0–240 km/h (0–149 mph)	Quarter mile	Top speed
Murciélago (2001–2006)	6,192 cc (6.2 L) V12	580 PS (427 kW; 572 hp) at 7,500 rpm, 650 N⋅m (479 lb⋅ft) at 5,400 rpm	3.8	8.3	21.4	11.7 at 196 km/h (122 mph)	official: 332 km/h (206 mph)
Murciélago LP 640-4 (2006–2010)	6,496 cc (6.5 L) V12	640 PS (471 kW; 631 hp) at 8,000 rpm, 660 N⋅m (487 lb⋅ft) at 6,000 rpm	3.4	7.5	--	11.2 seconds at 204 km/h (127 mph)	official: 340 km/h (211 mph)
Murciélago LP 640-4 Roadster (2006–2010)	6,496 cc (6.5 L) V12	640 PS (471 kW; 631 hp) at 8,000 rpm, 660 N⋅m (487 lb⋅ft) at 6,000 rpm	3.5	8.1	16.1	11.8 at 203 km/h (126 mph)	official: 336 km/h (209 mph)
Murciélago LP 650–4 Roadster (2010)	6,496 cc (6.5 L) V12	650 PS (478 kW; 641 hp) at 8,000 rpm, 660 N⋅m (487 lb⋅ft) at 6,000 rpm	3.1	-	-	-	official: 338 km/h (210 mph)
Murciélago LP 670–4 SuperVeloce (2009–2010)	6,496 cc (6.5 L) V12	670 PS (493 kW; 661 hp) at 8,000 rpm, 660 N⋅m (487 lb⋅ft) at 6,500 rpm	2.8	-	-	10.9 at 209.9 km/h (130.4 mph) (R&T)	official: 342 km/h (213 mph); 337 km/h (209 mph) with Aeropack Wing

== Motorsport ==
=== R-GT ===
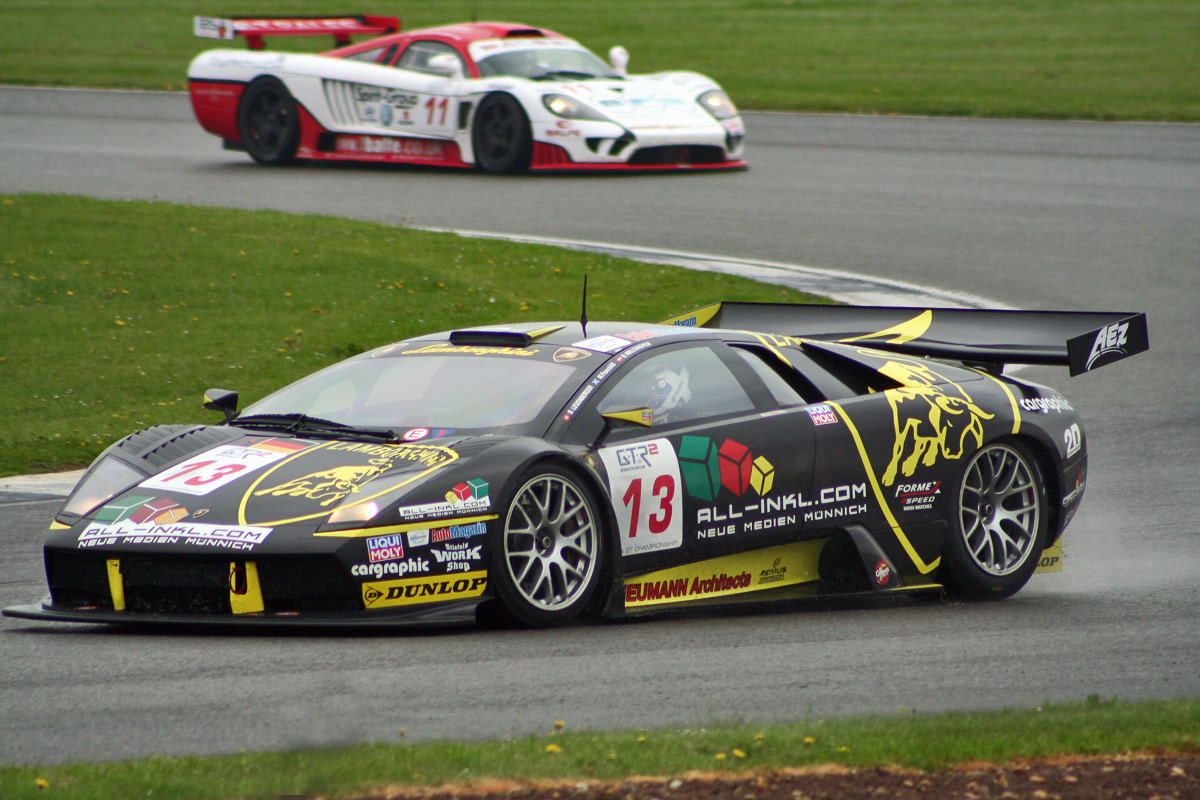
Reiter Engineering's Murciélago R-GT

The Lamborghini Murciélago R-GT is a racing version of the Murciélago, developed jointly with Reiter Engineering and Audi Sport, and unveiled at the 2003 Frankfurt Motor Show. Unlike the standard car, the R-GT is rear-wheel drive only, and in order to comply with the FIA, ACO, and JAF rules, the car retains the standard V12 engine, but air restrictors are used to manage power. Acceleration and top speed performance are dependent on gearing, as different ratios are used for different tracks. Most sources report that around 7 original R-GTs were sold. This number doesn't include later derivatives such as the RG-1 or R-SV.

In March 2007, the All-Inkl.com Racing Murciélago won the Zhuhai 2 Hours. A Murciélago R-GT was entered into the 2008 24 Hours of Le Mans but was not classified. However, a Murciélago R-GT entered jointly by IPB Spartak Racing and Reiter Engineering finished 8th overall and 5th in the GT1 class in the 2008 24 Hours of Spa.

In April 2009, beating a Corvette C6.R, and Saleen S7R, a Murciélago R-GT of the Russian IPB Spartak Racing Team won the GT1 class in the 1000 km de Catalunya, a LMS race. The drivers of the IPB Spartak Racing car were Russian, Roman Rusinov, and Dutch, Peter Kox. The Lamborghini made a pole position but was moved to the end of the grid due to some technical irregularities. They finished 2 laps ahead of the lead Corvette to take the second international win for a Lamborghini GT car.

=== RG-1 ===
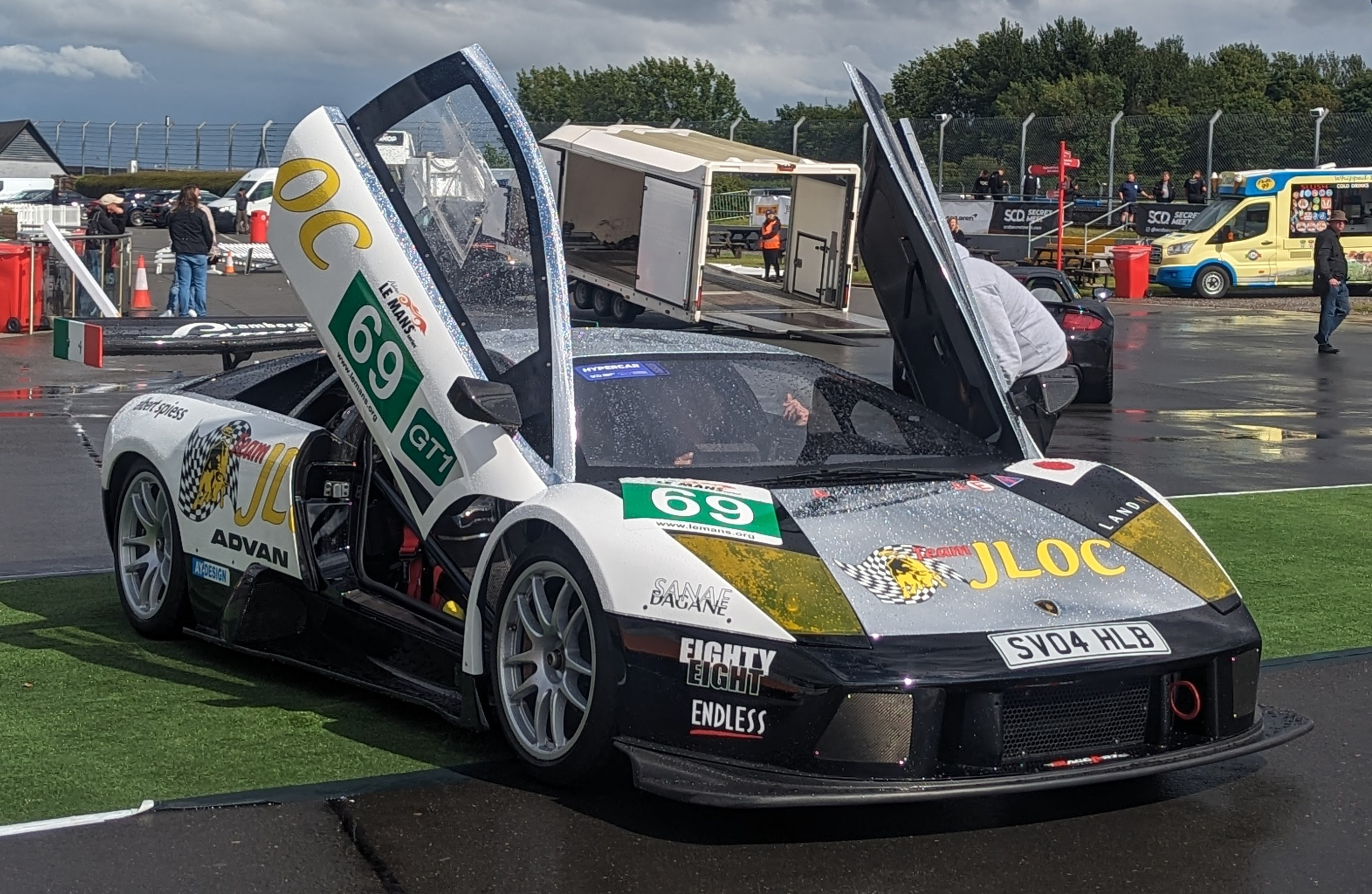
Murciélago RG-1 of JLOC

The Lamborghini Murciélago RG-1 was built for the Japan Lamborghini Owners Club (JLOC) to compete in Japanese Super GT series in 2004. In March 2006, the RG-1 recorded a win in the GT300 class at the Super GT Suzuka 500 km race.

==== RG-1LM ====
The Lamborghini Murciélago RG-1LM (alias: RGT-LM) is endurance version of Murciélago RG-1 specially developed for JLOC by Reiter Engineering and run in 24 Hours of Le Mans race in 2006. The car was not classified in that race after they failed to complete the final lap.

=== LP 670 R-SV ===
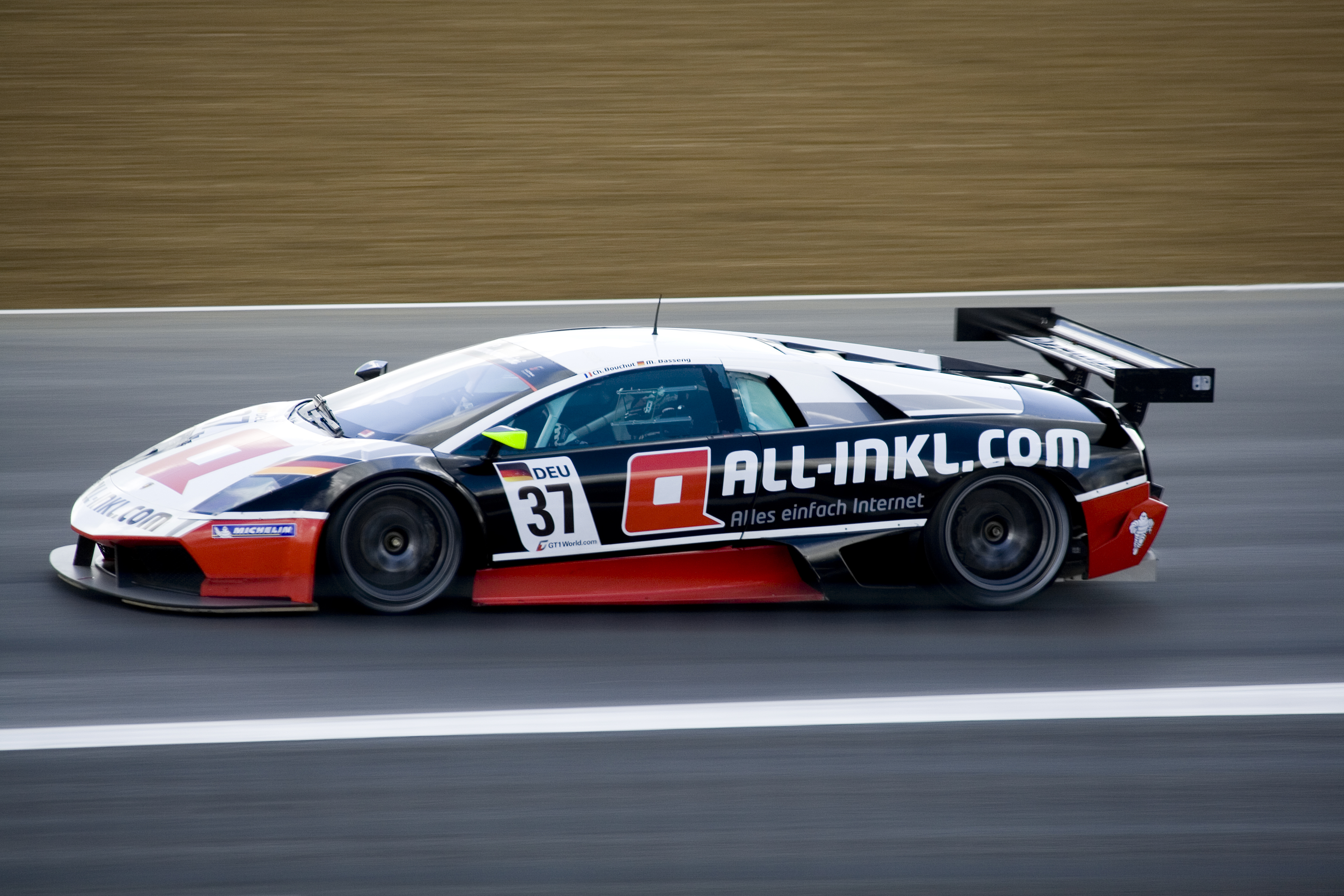
All-Inkl.com Münnich Motorsport's Murciélago R-SV, at the 2010 RAC Tourist Trophy

The Lamborghini Murciélago LP 670 R-SV is an evolution of the R-GT developed by Reiter Engineering to comply with the FIA rules for the new FIA GT1 World Championship. It was unveiled at the 2010 24 Hours of Spa weekend. The 2010 FIA GT1 World Championship season saw Reiter run two cars and the other two were run by All-Inkl.com Münnich Motorsport. Reiter saw some success winning two Championship races, finishing third in the teams' championship. The All-Inkl team did not have as much success finishing ninth in the championship. The 2011 season saw Swiss Racing Team run the ex-Reiter R-SV's, after an unsuccessful season in 2010 running Nissan GT-R's. All-Inkl has had a successful season so far topping the teams' championship as of round seven. Swiss Racing Team had some points finishes but after a crash between both cars at the Sachsenring round, they had a lack of spare parts and did not compete in the next three events. DKR Engineering announced that they would be using Murciélago R-SVs for the last 2 rounds of the season, instead of the Chevrolet Corvette C6.R that they were using for the first 8 rounds.

== Related development ==
=== Lamborghini Miura concept ===
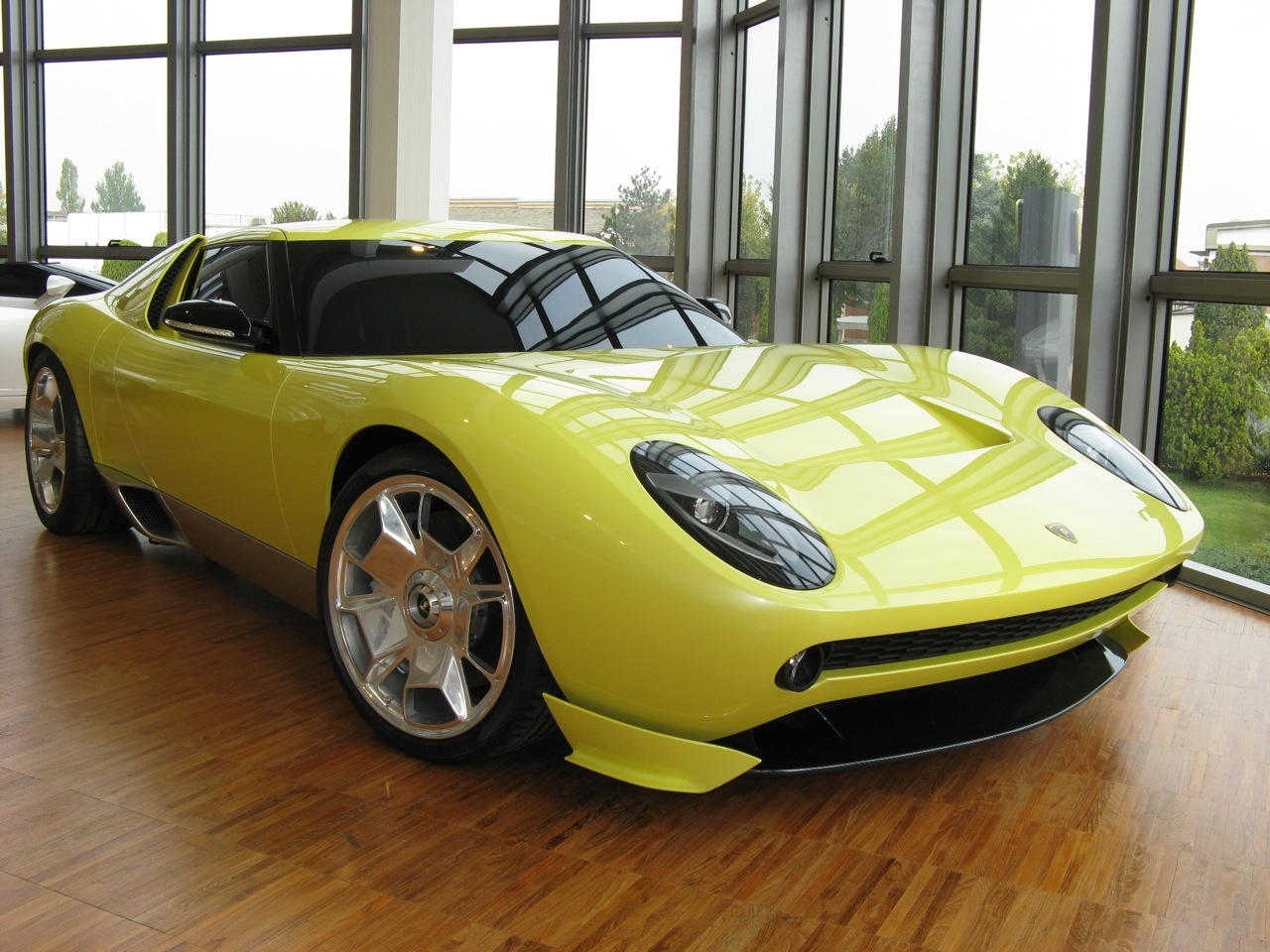
The 2006 Miura concept was based on a Murciélago chassis.

In January 2006, a retro-styled Lamborghini Miura concept car, built on a Murciélago chassis, was announced at the Museum of Television & Radio and promoted at the Los Angeles Auto Show, although the car itself was not present at the show. Subsequently, the Miura concept was officially debuted at the North American International Auto Show just two weeks later. It was the first design penned by Lamborghini's then design chief, Walter de'Silva, and commemorated the 40th anniversary of the 1966 introduction of the original Miura in Geneva.

Lamborghini president and CEO, Stefan Winkelmann, rejected any possibility of the concept marking the Miura's return to production, however, stating "The Miura was a celebration of our history, but Lamborghini is about the future. Retro design is not what we are here for. So we won't do the Miura."

=== Lamborghini Reventón ===
Lamborghini Reventón

Debuted in 2007 at the Frankfurt Auto Show, the Lamborghini Reventón is a modified version of the Murciélago. The car's mechanical underpinnings and engine are identical to those of the Murciélago LP 640. However, both the interior and exterior feature unique styling, inspired by stealth fighter design, taking cues from aircraft such as the F-22 Raptor. A total of 21 units were built, of which one was retained by the factory to be exhibited in the Lamborghini museum. Lamborghini also produced 15 units of a roadster version.

== Production ==
Year	Units	Coupé	Roadster
2001	65	65	-
2002	442	442	-
2003	424	424	-
2004	384	304	80
2005	464	230	234
2006	444	323	121
2007	629	423	206
2008	637	454	183
2009	331	274	57
2010	163	145	18
Total	3,983	3,084	899

== In popular culture ==
The Lamborghini Murciélago is featured on the cover and is in the car roster of the racing video game Need For Speed: Hot Pursuit 2. A Murciélago LP 640 in a police livery is also featured in the promotional video of Need For Speed: Hot Pursuit alongside a Pagani Zonda Cinque.

The Murciélago Roadster was used in the 2005 film Batman Begins and the Murciélago LP 640 was used in its sequel The Dark Knight. It is used as Bruce Wayne's personal transport, with its name meaning "bat" connecting to his identity as "Batman". Lamborghini lent the production crew of The Dark Knight three Murciélago LP 640s to use in a chase scene. One of the cars was destroyed in the process.

The Murciélago is the titular Lamborghini referenced in the Kanye West song Mercy, though the actual car depicted in the music video is a Lamborghini Gallardo LP560-4.
