= Forged composite =

Type of carbon fiber material

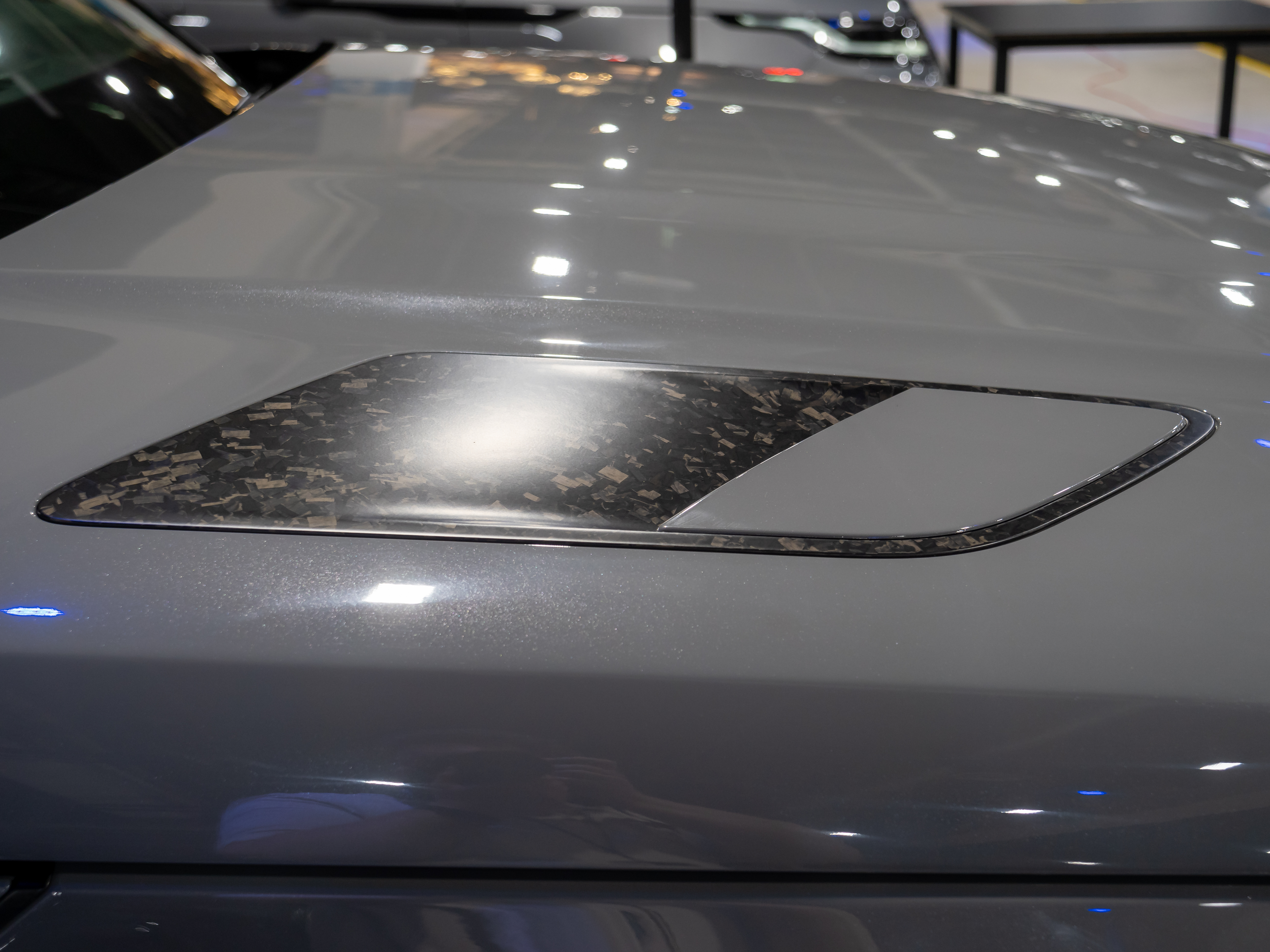
Forged composite piece on a Range Rover Sport

Forged composite, commonly referred to as forged carbon, is a type of carbon fiber SMC material composed of small pieces of carbon fiber composite material that are pressed into shape as the resin sets. This is in contrast to most carbon fiber composites, which are made of larger continuous layers that are 'laid up' one at a time, often manually. Forged composite allows for a higher range of shapes to be formed with precision, relative to traditional carbon fiber. It was originally developed jointly between Lamborghini, Callaway Golf Company, and the Lamborghini Lab. It was unveiled at the 2010 Paris Motor Show in a Lamborghini concept car, the Sesto Elemento. The United States trademark for forged composite was filed on July 13, 2010, in the category Toys and Sporting Goods Products by Callaway Golf, while the trademark for Forged Composites was registered in 2018 in the automotive category by Lamborghini.

Forged composite contains higher fiber volume content, which combined with higher variation in strand orientation, increases the average strength and reduce variability over standard carbon fiber. The material is claimed to have one-third the density of titanium and equal or greater strength, it is made from chopped carbon fiber tows immersed in a resin film which is then formed and cured. It uses about 500,000 intertwined fibers per square inch. Due to its chopped nature, it can be molded into much more complex geometries than traditional carbon fiber composites, and is suitable to make three-dimensional parts and parts which feature complex details such as thickness transitions, holes, compound curvature, etc.

Lamborghini uses forged composite for structural components, and interior trim and seats of its cars, the latter contributing to its winning of the JEC Composites Innovation Award for Automotive Interiors in 2016, due to the material's unique appearance. Union Binding Company entered a partnership with the Lamborghini ACSL in order to develop a snowboard binding using forged composite technology. In 2014, the all-forged composite "Union FC" snowboard binding was launched and subsequently won the 2014 ISPO Product of the Year Award.
