= Maurizio Reggiani =

Italian engineer

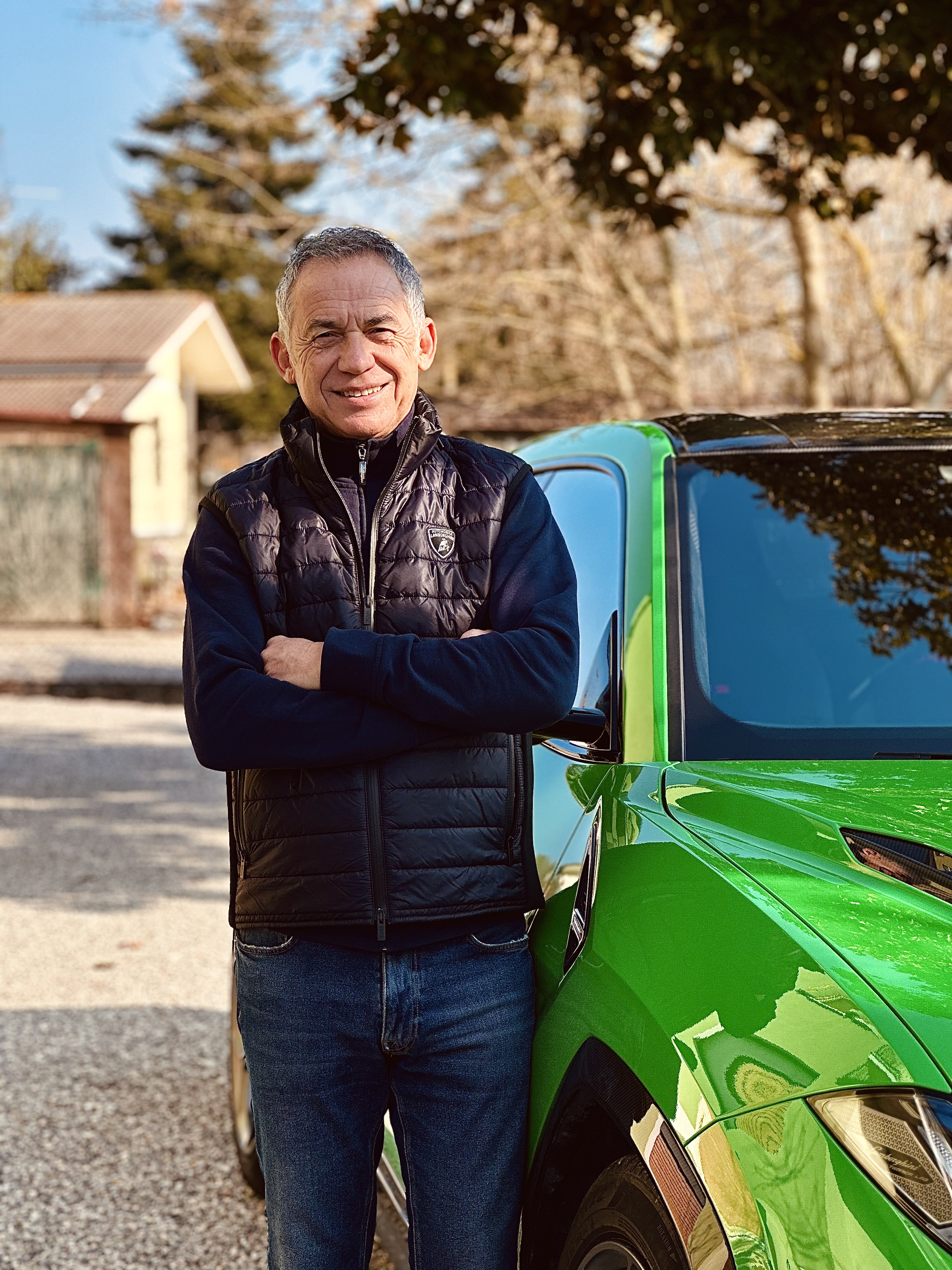
- Born: February 8, 1959 (age 67)
- Education: University of Modena
- Years active: 1982–present
- Title: Vice President of Lamborghini Motorsport

Maurizio Reggiani (born 8 February 1959) is an Italian engineer who currently serves as the vice president of Lamborghini Squadra Corse. He has been responsible for several Lamborghini flagship models.

== Career ==
Reggiani began his career in the automotive industry in 1982 at Maserati, where he was assigned to their engineering development department, focusing specifically on engines. Eventually, he became the head of the engineering development department, becoming responsible for all of the engines found in the Maserati Biturbo. In 1987, he left Maserati and was hired personally by Paolo Stanzani to work at the revived Bugatti, where he oversaw the development of the EB110's engine, gearbox, and transmission.

In 1995, Reggiani departed Bugatti and joined Lamborghini, where he was appointed the leader of the project of what became the Lamborghini Murciélago. He oversaw the development of the Murciélago until 2001, where he was transferred to lead the research and development department for powertrains and suspension. Prior to Audi's acquisition of Lamborghini in 1998, Reggiani approached Audi in 1995 for the engine of what was called a "baby Diablo". It was intended to be a downsized, cheaper option for customers who did not wish to opt for a Diablo; the Lamborghini Jalpa was the prior option, having been discontinued since 1988. Reggiani was tasked with procuring the V8 engine found in the first generation of the Audi A8, with the intention of transversley mounting the engine in the baby Diablo project. Audi decided it was more financially worthwhile to acquire Lamborghini, which it did so in 1998. The project was canned and a bespoke V10 engine was built instead for the miniature Diablo, the result of which was the 2003 Lamborghini Gallardo.

He was appointed chief technical officer of Lamborghini in 2006, and has since overseen every single new model and their respective special editions, including the Lamborghini Huracan, Lamborghini Aventador, and the Lamborghini Urus, among others. He attributes the success of various extremely limited edition models such as the Lamborghini Reventón to his first attempt at convincing Lamborghini's owners, Audi, to build a super limited edition car, which was the Lamborghini Diablo GT. He was replaced as chief technical officer of Lamborghini in January 2022 by Rouven Mohr, assuming the role of Vice President of Motorsport within Lamborghini.

== Awards ==
- 2023 - Laurea ad Honorem from the University of Bologna

== Personal life ==
Born in the Italian town of San Martino Spino, Reggiani graduated from the University of Modena with a degree in mechanical engineering. He also owns an Alfa Romeo Spider identical to the one featured in the romance film The Graduate. He is a member of SAE International and the Associazione Tecnica dell'Automobile.

== See also ==
- Paolo Stanzani
