= Lamborghini Sesto Elemento =

Limited edition Lamborghini

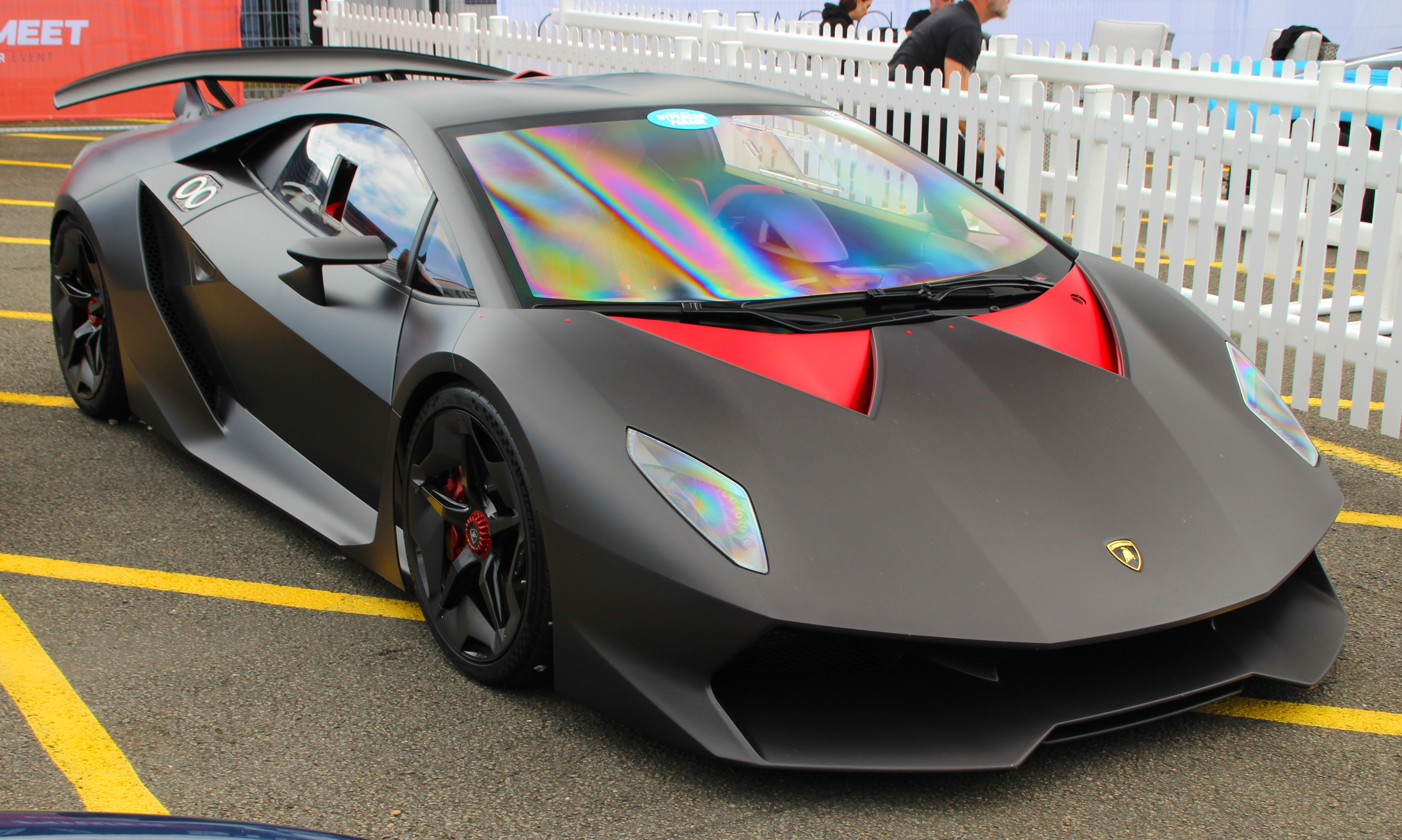

Overview
- Manufacturer: Lamborghini
- Production: 2012 (20 produced)
- Assembly: Italy: Sant'Agata Bolognese
- Designer: Filippo Perini

Body and chassis
- Class: Track day car
- Body style: 2-door coupé
- Layout: Mid-engine, all-wheel-drive
- Related: Lamborghini Gallardo

Powertrain
- Engine: Odd-firing 5.2L Lamborghini V10
- Transmission: 6-speed e-gear automated manual

Dimensions
- Wheelbase: 2,560 mm (100.8 in)
- Length: 4,580 mm (180.3 in)
- Width: 2,045 mm (80.5 in)
- Height: 1,135 mm (44.7 in)
- Kerb weight: 999 kg (2,202 lb)

The Lamborghini Sesto Elemento ("sixth element") is a high-performance limited edition car produced by the Italian automobile manufacturer Lamborghini, which debuted at the 2010 Paris Motor Show. The Sesto Elemento's name is a reference to the atomic number of carbon, referring to the carbon fibre used in its construction.

== Design and specifications ==
The Sesto Elemento is equipped with Lamborghini's 6-speed "e-gear" automated manual transmission and an all-wheel-drive system, mated to a 5.2 litre V10 engine borrowed from the Gallardo Superleggera, producing 570 PS (419 kW; 562 hp) and 540 N⋅m (398 lbf⋅ft) of torque. Lamborghini says that eighty percent of the Sesto Elemento is carbon fiber, including the chassis, body, drive shafts, wheels and suspension components, reducing the overall weight to 999 kg (2,202 lb), a weight comparable to subcompact cars. The Sesto Elemento was the first car to use forged carbon fibre (in the tub and suspension arms), a new type of carbon composite developed by Lamborghini and Callaway Golf Company.

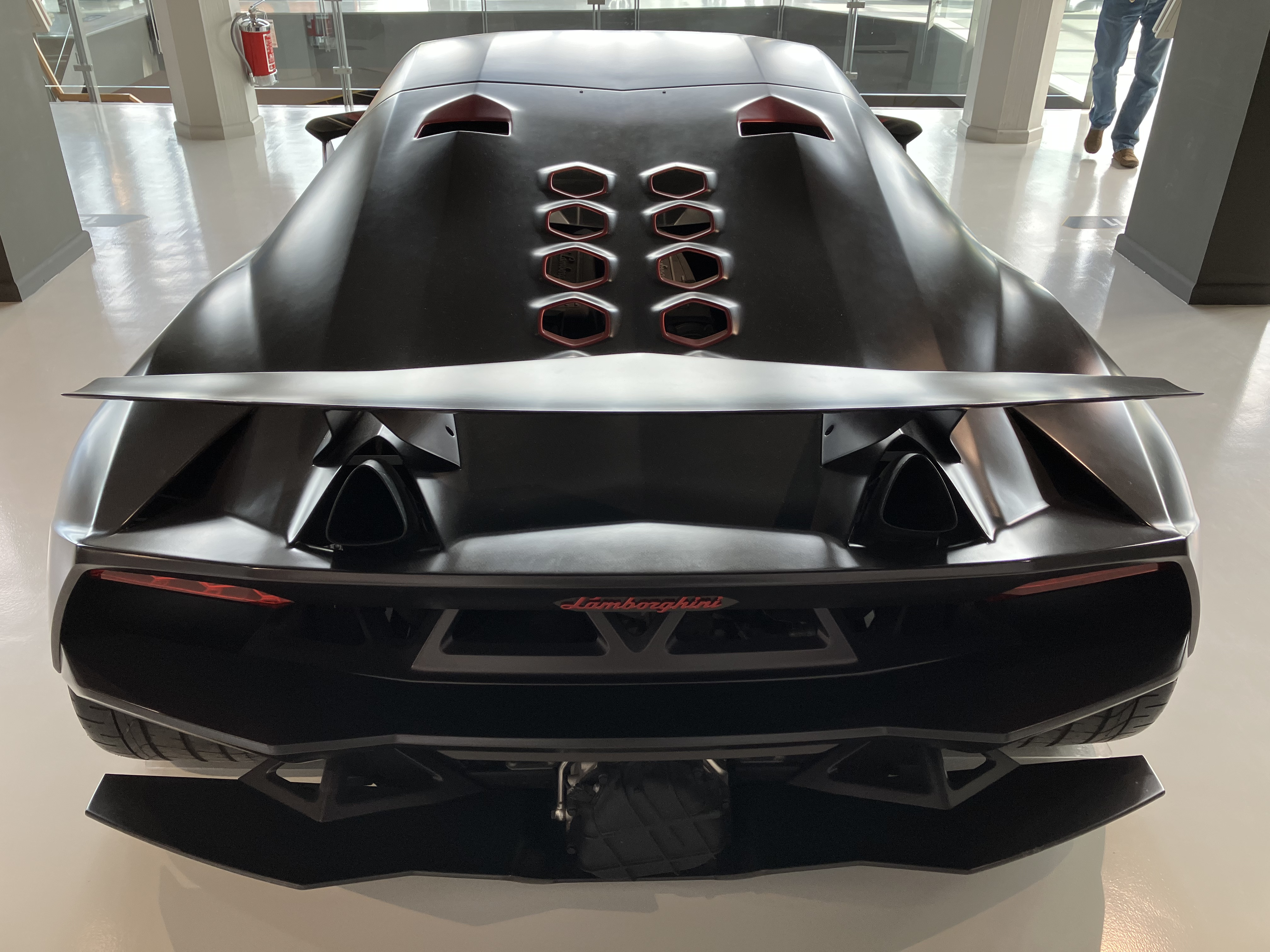
Sesto Elemento rear deck lid at the Lamborghini museum

The engine is cooled through 10 distinctive hexagonal holes in the engine cover, while two intakes funnel cool air into the mid-mounted engine compartment and the exhaust pipes are positioned behind the base of the rear wing. Lamborghini claims a 0–100 km/h (0–62 mph) acceleration time of 2.5 seconds, 0–200 km/h (0–124 mph) time of 8.0 seconds, and a top speed of 387 km/h (240.3 mph).

The interior of the Sesto Elemento is generally bare without vehicle comforts such as air-conditioning and stereo. The Sesto Elemento also lacks separate seats, instead having foam padding directly adhered to the carbon fibre chassis.

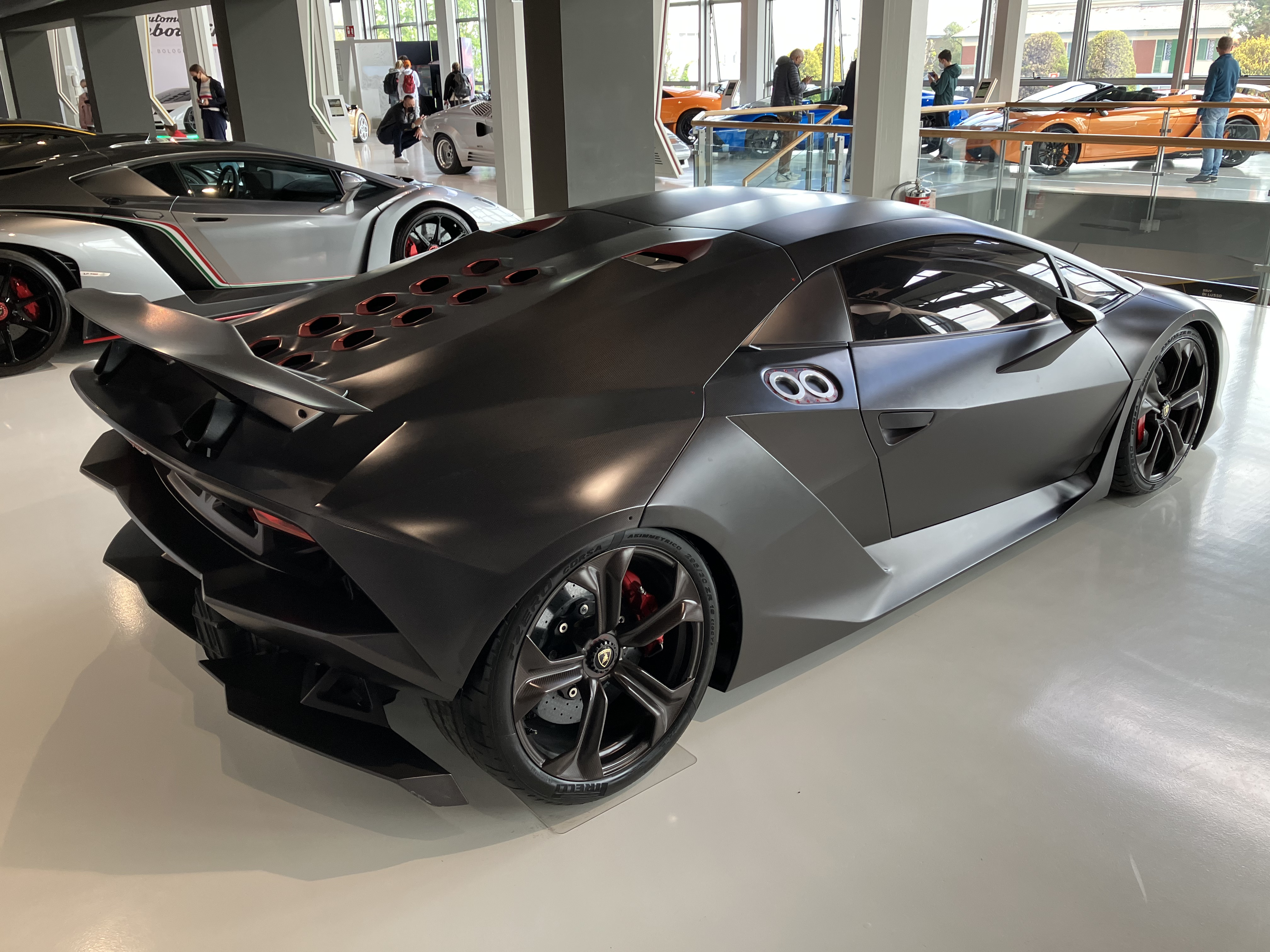
Sesto Elemento rear side at the Lamborghini Museum

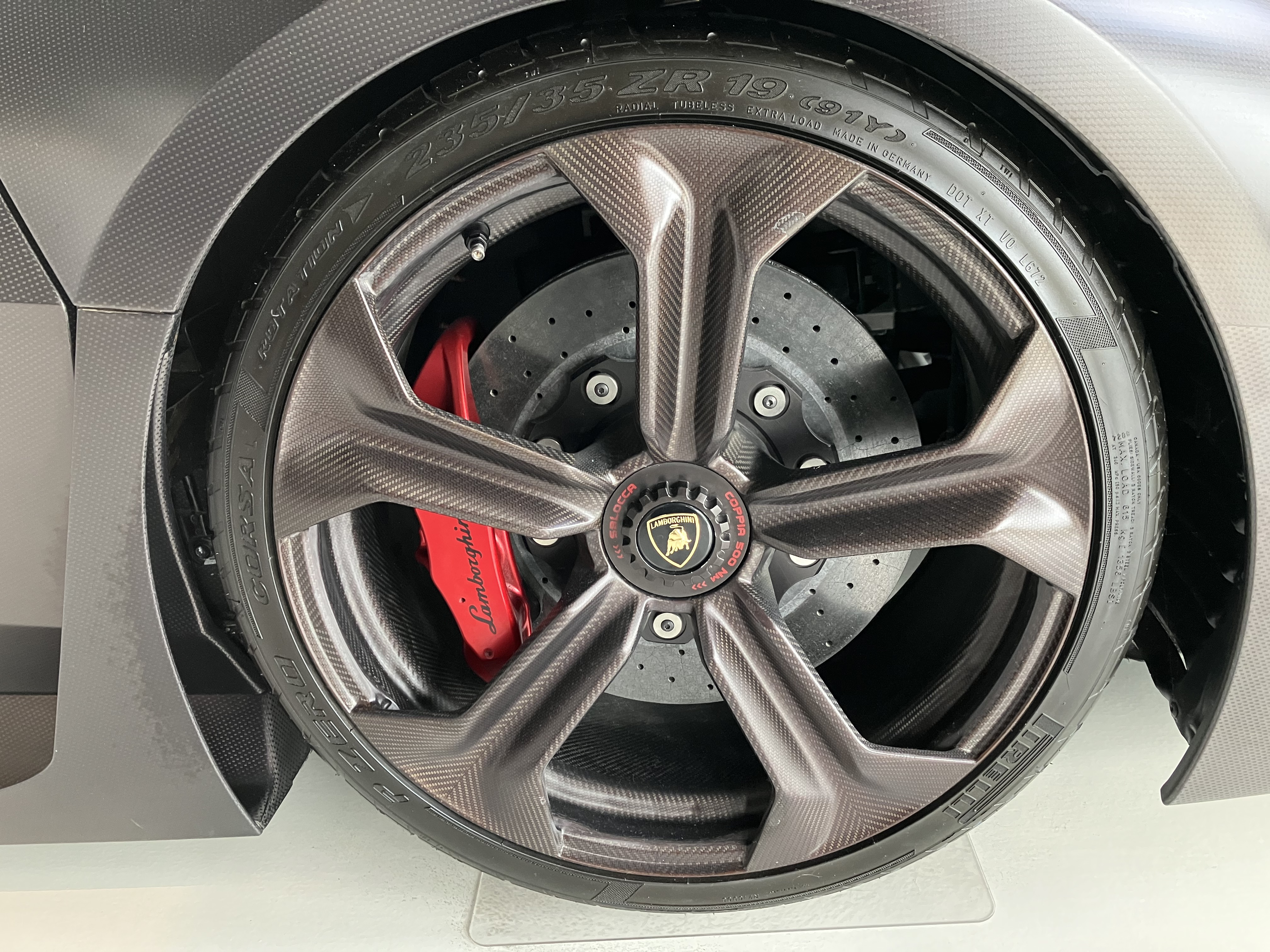
The Sesto Elemento's center locking carbon wheel

== Production ==
Lamborghini announced plans to produce 20 cars for track use only in mid-2011 with each car costing US$2.92 million. At that time, the Sesto Elemento was the most expensive Lamborghini ever made, until the Veneno was launched. Due to a reported lack of interest for such an expensive car that was not road legal, it is believed by some that Lamborghini ended up producing just 10 Sesto Elementos, rather than the planned 20. This is corroborated through the record keeping of vehicle identification numbers, but has not been admitted publicly by Lamborghini.

Singapore was the recipient of more cars than any other country with four cars arriving in 2014, though some have since left the country. The United States of America received no Sesto Elementos, though a demonstration chassis resides at the Boeing Everett Factory occasionally on display, as Boeing aided Lamborghini in their carbon fibre development..

Only two of the cars produced have been converted by their owners into road legal versions.
