= Transformers: The Last Knight =

2017 film by Michael Bay

- Theatrical release poster
- Directed by: Michael Bay
- Screenplay by: Art Marcum; Matt Holloway; Ken Nolan
- Story by: Akiva Goldsman; Art Marcum; Matt Holloway; Ken Nolan
- Based on: Hasbro's Transformers action figures
- Produced by: Lorenzo di Bonaventura; Tom DeSanto; Don Murphy; Ian Bryce
- Starring: Mark Wahlberg; Josh Duhamel; Stanley Tucci; Anthony Hopkins
- Cinematography: Jonathan Sela
- Edited by: Mark Sanger; John Refoua; Debra Neil-Fisher; Roger Barton; Adam Gerstel; Calvin Wimmer
- Music by: Steve Jablonsky
- Production companies: Paramount Pictures; Huahua Media; The Weying Galaxy; The H Collective; Hasbro Studios; Di Bonaventura Pictures
- Distributed by: Paramount Pictures
- Release dates: June 18, 2017 (Odeon Leicester Square); June 21, 2017 (United States)
- Running time: 149 minutes
- Country: United States
- Language: English
- Budget: $217–260 million
- Box office: $605.4 million

Transformers: The Last Knight is a 2017 American science fiction action film based on Hasbro's Transformers toy line. It is the sequel to Transformers: Age of Extinction (2014) and the fifth installment in the Transformers film series. The film was directed by Michael Bay and written by Art Marcum, Matt Holloway, and Ken Nolan. Mark Wahlberg reprises his role from the fourth film, while Josh Duhamel, John Turturro and Glenn Morshower reprise their roles from the first three films. Stanley Tucci returns as a different character after also appearing in the fourth film, and Laura Haddock, Isabela Moner, Jerrod Carmichael, Santiago Cabrera, and Anthony Hopkins all join the cast. In the film, Cade Yeager forms an alliance with a secret society that has ties to the Transformers race on Earth after being given an ancient artifact that was once belonged to a Cybertronian sorceress.

Transformers: The Last Knight premiered on June 18, 2017, at the Odeon Luxe Leicester Square in London and was released in the United States on June 21, by Paramount Pictures. The film received generally negative reviews from critics, and grossed $605 million against a production budget between $217–260 million. Despite its high gross, the film became a box office disappointment, resulting in an estimated $100 million loss for Paramount on its theatrical release. It was followed by Bumblebee, in 2018.

== Plot ==
In 484 AD, Merlin finds the Knights of Iacon, a group of Transformers hiding on Earth, seeking their help to aid King Arthur and his knights. They give him a staff and help Arthur defeat the Saxons, but warn Merlin to keep it hidden.

In the present day, following the events of Hong Kong, (Note: As depicted in Transformers: Age of Extinction (2014)) Optimus Prime arrives on the ruins of Cybertron and meets the Cybertronian goddess Quintessa, who brainwashes him into becoming Nemesis Prime and sends him to Earth to retrieve Merlin's staff, which will restore Cybertron by taking energy from Earth's core, which is actually Unicron, also a Transformer and Cybertron's ancient enemy.

On Earth, a new paramilitary task force called the Transformers Reaction Force (TRF) continues to hunt Transformers. Some U.S. military personnel who work with the TRF, including former NEST members Colonel William Lennox and General Morshower, reluctantly oppose its actions. Cade Yeager, now a fugitive, hides Transformer refugees in his junkyard. In a war-torn Chicago, Cade and Bumblebee meet a teenage scavenger named Izabella and her Transformer companion, Sqweeks, before encountering a dying Transformer who gives them a talisman. The TRF confronts Cade, but Bumblebee and Hound stop them, then let them go.

Megatron (having abandoned his Galvatron identity), his remaining Decepticons, and the U.S. government learn of the talisman's value and reluctantly join forces to retrieve it and track Bumblebee to Cade's scrapyard. While the Autobots and the Dinobots fend off the Decepticons and the TRF, Cade, his assistant Jimmy, Izabella, and Sqweeks deal with a swarm of TRF drones sent after them. Cogman, a human-sized Transformer, appears and invites Cade to the United Kingdom to meet his employer, Sir Edmund Burton, the last living member of a secret society called the Order of the Witwiccans. Burton asks another Transformer, Hot Rod, to find Viviane Wembly, a University of Oxford professor.

Burton explains to Cade and Viviane that Transformers have been living amongst mankind for centuries, and the Order of the Witwiccans once guarded their existence. The talisman can lead to Merlin's staff, buried in a Cybertronian spacecraft under the sea. Viviane is revealed to be the direct descendant of Merlin's bloodline and the only one who can activate the staff. The authorities discover them, forcing the group to flee. Following clues, the group soon commandeers the HMS Alliance to find the spacecraft while the TRF and the Navy SEALs tail them.

After locating the ship, Cade and Viviane find Merlin's tomb, and Viviane activates Merlin's buried staff, awakening the Knights of Iacon. The TRF and Navy SEALs ambush Cade and Viviane to take the staff, but Viviane is forced to surrender it to the arriving Optimus. Bumblebee, Cade, and Lennox engage Optimus, during which Bumblebee speaks in his voice for the first time after he is given a spare voice box, freeing Optimus from Quintessa's control. The Decepticons, revealed to have aligned themselves with Quintessa, ambush Optimus and Cade and steal the staff. The Knights arrive to execute Optimus but yield to Cade and join the humans and the Autobots upon seeing Cade's talisman turn into Excalibur. Burton tries to stop Megatron from activating the staff at Stonehenge, but Megatron fires a fatal blast at him.

As Cybertron ravages Earth, using its energy to reconstitute itself, the Autobots, Dragonstorm, and the humans launch a direct assault on Cybertron to defeat the Decepticons and Quintessa. Viviane removes the staff and stops the transfer. Optimus defeats Megatron while Bumblebee seemingly kills Quintessa. With both worlds saved but now attached, the Autobots leave Earth to rebuild Cybertron.

Meanwhile, Quintessa, who survived, disguises herself as a human, approaches a group of scientists inspecting one of Unicron's horns, and offers them a way to destroy him.

== Cast ==
=== Humans ===
- Mark Wahlberg as Cade Yeager: A single father and inventor who helped the Autobots during the events of Age of Extinction.
- Josh Duhamel as William Lennox: A former NEST commander and U.S. Army Ranger who partnered with the Autobots prior to the events of Dark of the Moon, and now a Colonel and reluctant member of the Transformers Reaction Force (TRF).
- Stanley Tucci as Wizard Merlin: A wizard who knew the secret of the Guardian Knights and called on them in a moment of need. He previously portrayed Joshua Joyce in Age of Extinction.
- Anthony Hopkins as Sir Edmund Burton, 12th Earl of Folgan: An astronomer and historian who knows about the history of the Transformers on Earth.
- Laura Haddock as Viviane Wembly: A professor of English Literature at the University of Oxford and a polo player, who turns out to be a descendant of Merlin. Minti Gorne portrays a younger Viviane.
- Isabela Merced as Izabella: A street-wise who was orphaned by the Battle of Chicago in Dark of the Moon and now lives in the city ruins with Sqweeks and Canopy, her only friends, until meeting Cade.
- Jerrod Carmichael as Jimmy: A young man from South Dakota whom Cade hired through a want ad.
- Santiago Cabrera as Santos: A former Delta Force operative and commander of the TRF, who seeks to eradicate every Transformer and their human allies regardless of faction. He also tries to capture or kill Cade Yeager as he knows he's working with the Autobots.
- John Turturro as Seymour Simmons: A former government agent of Sector 7 and NEST turned successful writer who hides out in Cuba, and was allied with the Autobots prior to the events of Dark of the Moon.
- Glenn Morshower as General Morshower: A former leader of NEST in Revenge of the Fallen and Dark of the Moon who now supervises TRF operations.
- Liam Garrigan as King Arthur: The legendary knight who first fought with the Knights of Iacon. Garrigan previously portrayed a different iteration of King Arthur in the fifth season of the TV series Once Upon a Time.

Additionally, Mitch Pileggi, Tony Hale, and Gil Birmingham appear as a TRF group leader, an arrogant JPL engineer, and Chief Sherman, respectively. Former Navy SEAL Remi Adeleke also stars in the film as an unnamed TRF operator working for Santos, alongside other Navy SEAL veterans who play TRF operators in the movie's climax. Nicola Peltz has a vocal cameo as Tessa Yeager, Cade's daughter, who helped the Autobots during the events of Age of Extinction and is seen in a photograph in Cade's trailer, while Shia LaBeouf is seen as Sam Witwicky, who allied with the Autobots in events prior to Age of Extinction, in a photograph spotted in Burton's mansion that Sam had used as his eBay profile picture. Stephen Hogan plays Viviane's father in flashback scenes.

=== Voices ===
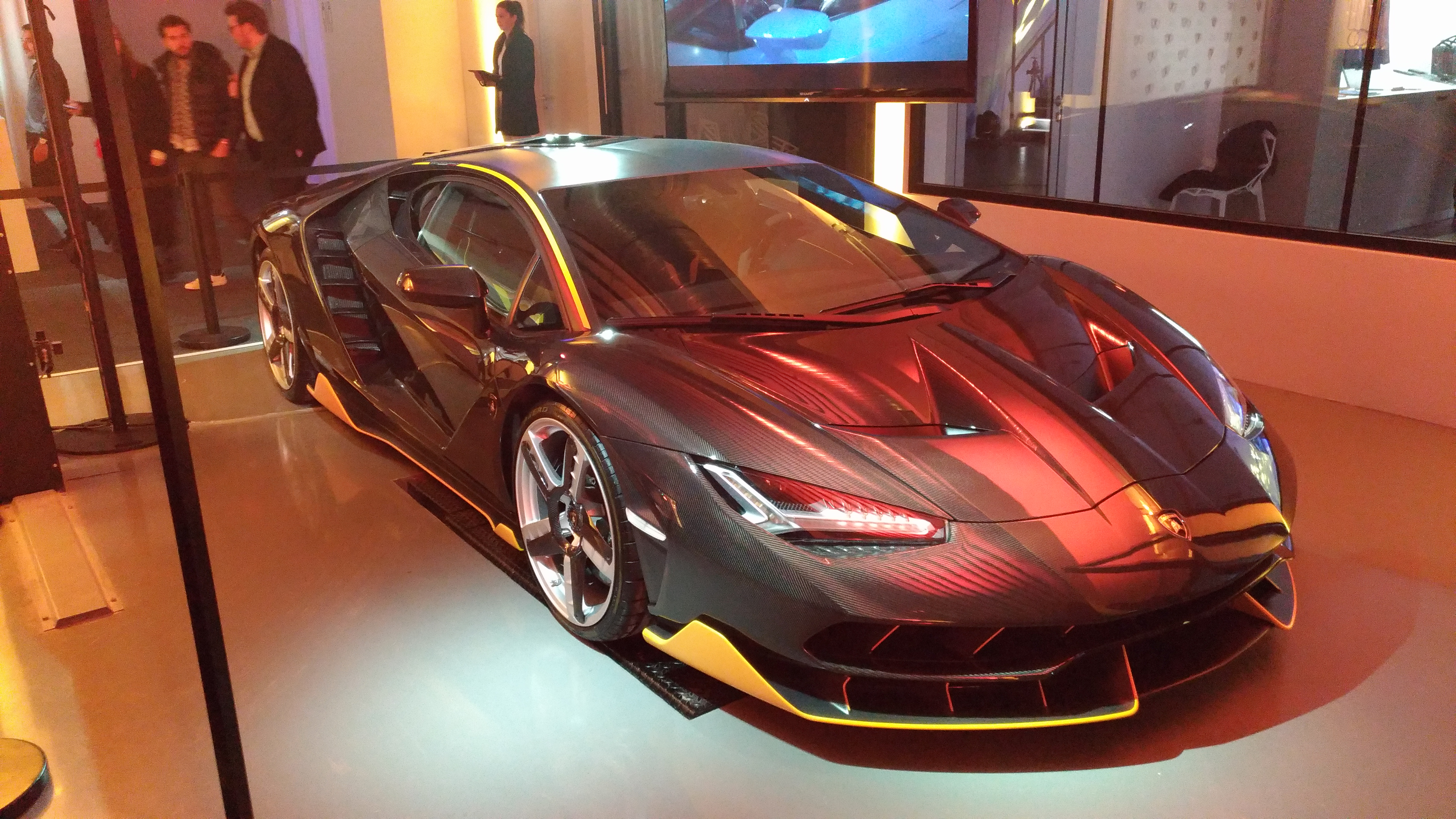
The Lamborghini Centenario LP770-4 is an alternate form used by Hot Rod.

- Peter Cullen as Optimus Prime: The leader of the Autobots, who is searching for the truth about his Creators. In this film, he transforms into a blue and red 2014 Western Star 5700 Custom semi-trailer truck.
- Gemma Chan as Quintessa: A Cybertronian Sorceress, the supposed "Prime of Life", and the supposed creator of the Cybertronians, who wants to use the Staff of Merlin to destroy Unicron and, by extension, Earth, which was formed around Unicron's body, in order to revitalize a rebuilt Cybertron. Chan appears on-screen briefly as Quintessa in a disguised human form at the end of the film.
- Erik Aadahl as Bumblebee / ZB-7: An Autobot scout and Optimus Prime's second-in-command, who transforms into a custom-built yellow and black 2017 Chevrolet Camaro with a body kit.
- Jim Carter as Cogman: A polite but sociopathic human-sized Autobot. He serves as the faithful butler to Sir Edmund Burton and despite not having a larger robot mode, he transforms into a 2017 Aston Martin DB11 in the toyline.
- Omar Sy as Hot Rod: An Autobot who transforms into a 1975 Citroën DS before upgrading into a 2017 Lamborghini Centenario LP770-4. He is brother-in-arms with Bumblebee and speaks in a thick French accent, which he's ashamed of and wishes to remove.
- Ken Watanabe as Drift: A Samurai-motif Autobot tactician and former Decepticon who transforms into a black and red 2017 Mercedes-AMG GT R.
- John Goodman as Hound: A trigger-happy Autobot commando and field medic who transforms into an olive green Mercedes-Benz Unimog military tactical ambulance.
- John DiMaggio as:
  - Crosshairs: A cocky Autobot paratrooper and sniper who transforms into a green and black 2017 Chevrolet Corvette C7 Stingray, equipped with a custom split-spoiler. His ego lends him a misplaced belief in his future command of the Autobots.
  - Nitro Zeus: A showboating Decepticon hunter who transforms into a JAS 39 Gripen Fighter Jet.
- Reno Wilson as:
  - Sqweeks: A small Autobot and Izabella's closest friend who can transform into a blue Vespa and only says "Chihuahua" due to prior damage.
  - Mohawk: A talkative and psychotic Decepticon foot soldier who transforms into a Confederate P51 Combat Fighter Motorcycle. His spark is in his head due to his body being skinny.
- Jess Harnell as Barricade: A Decepticon scout who was thought to have been killed in Dark of the Moon. He now transforms into a 2016 Ford Mustang police car, featuring a new, sleeker robot mode.
- Tom Kenny as Wheelie: An Autobot and former Decepticon who survived the Chicago battle in Dark of the Moon and transforms into a remote-controlled monster truck.
- Steve Buscemi as Daytrader: An Autobot scavenger who transforms into a cloaked rusty Mercedes-Benz LK Model 1920 dump truck.
- Steven Barr as Topspin: An Autobot Wrecker who resides in Cuba with Simmons that once transformed into a #48 Hendrick Motorsports Lowe's/Kobalt car. In the film, he is credited as "Volleybot" and grows a metallic beard that resembles his fallen comrade, Leadfoot.
- Mark Ryan as:
  - Bulldog: An Autobot veteran of World War I and a sentry for Burton's castle, who transforms into an army green Mark IV tank and suffers from 'robot dementia'
  - Lieutenant: An elderly Autobot that transforms into a Hawker Hurricane fighter plane that cameos at Burton's castle.
- Various uncredited actors voice:
  - The Knights of Iacon: a group of twelve Cybertronian Knights that protects the Staff and merge to form the three-headed dragon, Dragonstorm. They include Dragonicus, Stormreign, Steelbane, and Skullitron.
  - Canopy: An Autobot refugee and a friend of Izabella who transforms into a shielding pile of rubble.
  - Berserker: A monstrous Decepticon commando who transforms into a 2017 Chevy Tahoe emergency vehicle.
  - Onslaught: A Decepticon tactician who transforms into a green Western Star 4900SF tow truck.
- Frank Welker as Megatron: The revived leader of the Decepticons who transforms into a Cybertronian jet.

=== Non-speaking characters ===
- Grimlock
  The leader of the Dinobots, who transforms into a mechanical horned, fire-breathing Tyrannosaurus.
- Slug
  The savage Dinobot destroyer who transforms into a mechanical spiked and bestial Triceratops.
- Mini-Dinobots
  The Mini versions of Grimlock, Slug, and Strafe named: Sharp T! (mini Grimlock), 'Tops (mini Slug), Pterry (mini Strafe with only one head)
- A Transformer who takes the form of the submarine HMS Alliance appears, though not seen in robot mode as it can't transform.
- Trench
  An Autobot who resembles Constructicon Scrapper and transforms into a Cat 320 excavator.
- Dreadbot
  A Decepticon thug who transforms into a rusty 1960 Volkswagen Type 2.
- Infernocons
  Quintessa's demonic guardians who combine to form Infernocus.
- Unicron
  A giant planet-destroying Transformer appearing as Planet Earth and six of his mechanical horns are seen.

== Production ==
=== Development ===
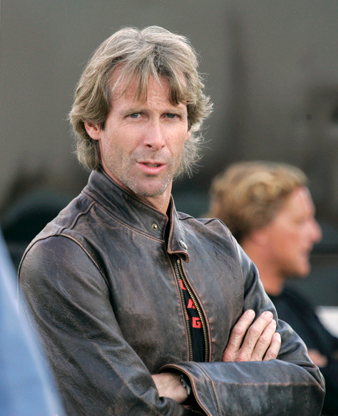
Michael Bay announced that it would be the last Transformers film he would direct.

Following the release of Transformers: Age of Extinction (2014), Paramount Pictures tasked Akiva Goldsman in March 2015 to work with the film franchise's director Michael Bay, executive producer Steven Spielberg, and producer Lorenzo di Bonaventura to set up a writers' room to create ideas for future Transformers films. According to Goldsman, the writing team would look at various Transformers media created by Hasbro for inspiration; if they found one that interested them, they could submit a treatment, which would then be further developed by the whole team. In July 2015, Goldsman and Jeff Pinkner signed on as writers. On November 20, due to Goldsman's commitments creating a writers' room for G.I. Joe and Micronauts properties, Paramount began to negotiate with Art Marcum and Matt Holloway, as well as Ken Nolan, to write the film. Lindsey Beer and Geneva Robertson-Dworet were also brought aboard for writing duties.

I think I brought the concern to the movie studio and certainly to the writers.

Perhaps...Transformers 5 and 6 movies will go back more to its roots. There was an occasion where one line [in Transformers: Age of Extinction] which Optimus Prime had, I did not want to say. It was my gut instinct and certainly my commitment to the character... not to say the line. But I was told to say. You can't fight the big boys. I think you all know what that line was.

— Peter Cullen on a question from a fan on the future of the franchise from Sac-Anime 2015

Bay had decided not to direct any future Transformers films after Age of Extinction, but in early January 2016, he stated that he would return to direct the fifth film as his last. Paramount Pictures spent $80 million on production in Michigan, in return for $21 million in state incentives, under agreements entered into before the state legislature eliminated the film office incentive program in July 2015. In April 2016, Paramount hired cinematographer Jonathan Sela. On May 17, Bay revealed the official title of the film to be The Last Knight on his Instagram account, where he also posted a production video showing a close-up of Optimus Prime's face with purple eyes instead of blue, and his face mostly discolored. The official Twitter account showed a 19-second short video in morse code that translates to "I'm coming for you May 31". On May 31, it was revealed that Megatron would return in the sequel.

=== Casting ===
In December 2014, Mark Wahlberg confirmed that he would return in the sequel. In February 2016, there were casting calls for new lead and supporting roles in Los Angeles and London, and Peter Cullen was announced as returning to voice Optimus Prime. Approximately 850 cast and crew were hired, 450 of whom were Michigan residents, equating to 228 full-time positions. Additionally, 700 extras were hired from among Detroit residents, as part of Paramount's incentive deal with the state. On April 13, TheWrap reported that Isabela Moner was in talks to star as Izabella. The site also reported that Bay was eyeing Jean Dujardin, Stephen Merchant, and Jerrod Carmichael for supporting roles. On May 17, 2016, it was confirmed that Josh Duhamel would reprise his role in the film, and Jerrod Carmichael was cast. In June 2016, Anthony Hopkins, Mitch Pileggi, Santiago Cabrera, and Laura Haddock joined the cast, and Tyrese Gibson stated that he will return as Robert Epps. In August 2016, Liam Garrigan was confirmed to play King Arthur, a different version from his role as the same character on the television series Once Upon a Time. On September 4, 2016, Stanley Tucci confirmed his return. On October 14, 2016, Bay announced that John Turturro would reprise his role as Seymour Simmons from the first three films, and that John Goodman would return to voice Hound. A month before the film's release, Bay revealed that the character Cogman would be voiced by Downton Abbey actor Jim Carter, at the request of co-writer Matt Holloway, who is a fan of the series. On June 9, 2017, Reno Wilson confirmed he would have a voice role in the film. On June 16, 2017, Gibson revealed that despite closing a deal for the film, he was unable to appear as Epps due to scheduling conflicts with The Fate of the Furious.

=== Filming ===
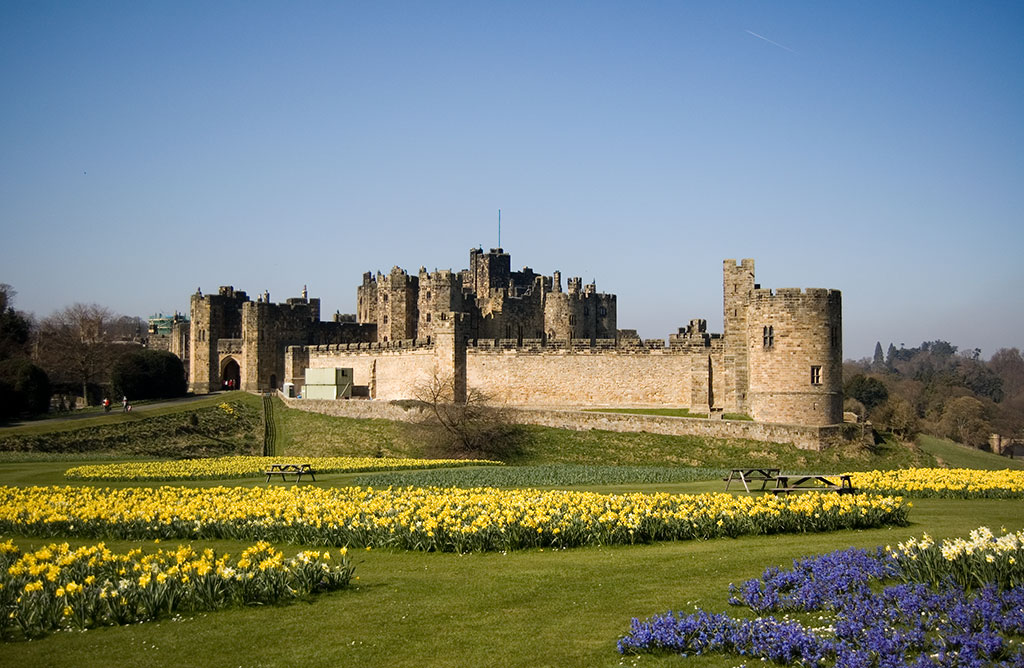
Alnwick Castle in Alnwick, Northumberland, one of the many locations used in the film

Principal photography began on May 25, 2016, in Havana, Cuba, with a few scenes shot by a "small team". Filming continued on June 6, 2016, in Phoenix, Arizona, and on June 19, 2016, in Detroit, Michigan, under the working title E75, with additional filming taking place in Chicago, Illinois. In Detroit, filming took place in the Michigan Motion Pictures Studio, Packard Plant, Michigan Central Station, Cafe D'Mongo's Speakeasy, and MGM Grand Detroit. Production moved to Europe on August 21, and filming commenced on August 22 in Scotland and Wales. In England, filming took place in North Yorkshire, Newcastle upon Tyne, Northumberland, London, Gosport and Stonehenge. Between August and October, filming occurred in Northern Ireland, and Preikestolen, Trolltunga and Atlanterhavsveien in Norway. The Trinity Library Oxford scene was filmed in the Old Library, Trinity College Dublin.

In early September 2016, filming took place in Alnwick Castle in Alnwick Northumberland in England, including car chase scenes. Production continued at St Aidan's Church, Seahouses, where Wahlberg spent an hour inside the church and reportedly donated £200. Rev Father Des McGiven said: "I didn't even know he was in church until he left. One of my parishioners, Danielle Love, recognized him and explained who he was. It's great that we had him in for the service, and we appreciate his generosity towards our church." Car chases were also filmed at the Monument area of Newcastle upon Tyne, where Josh Duhamel was filming, while Wahlberg and Sir Anthony Hopkins continued at Alnwick, Seahouses and the Bamburgh Region of Northumberland. In late September 2016, filming was spotted in Gosport, Hampshire at the Royal Navy Submarine Museum. On October 5, 2016, filming was spotted at St Bartholomew-the-Great, London. London filming wrapped on October 27, 2016. Principal photography wrapped on December 4, 2016.

Scenes were shot in at least four different aspect ratios, including 1.90:1 (IMAX), 2.00:1 (Univisium), 2.28:1, & 2.39:1 (Panavision). This has been stated by the movie's director of photography, Jonathan Sela, to be due to a large number of different types of cameras on set, including the Red 6K Weapon Dragon, the Alexa IMAX 3-D rig and the IMAX 3-D Phantom 65.

=== Effects ===
As with previous Transformers installments, Industrial Light & Magic served as the main visual effects company for Transformers: The Last Knight. In early 2016, the company showed Bay an underwater rendering of a crash-landed alien spaceship and a new dump-truck Transformer with a cloak.

=== Music ===
On September 27, it was confirmed that Steve Jablonsky would return to write the score, having composed the music for the first four films. The score was released digitally on the film's original release date, Friday June 23, 2017, and a limited-edition two-disc CD set of 3,000 units were released by La-La Land Records on July 25, 2017. Unlike the previous films' scores, which contained anywhere from fourteen to twenty-three tracks, the film's soundtrack contains thirty-four tracks, amounting to over two hours of music.

On the score, Jablonsky said, "I met with Michael before he started shooting 'Transformers: The Last Knight.' He showed me some amazing concept art and explained how the story connects the history of Transformers all the way back to the times of King Arthur and the Knights of the Round Table. I loved the idea because it gave me the opportunity to explore new musical ideas. The storyline allowed me to write melodies that are a bit more 'classical' than I've written for the other Transformers films, which was a lot of fun for me. Another important aspect of the story revolves around massive skyscraper-sized 'horns from hell' that start emerging from the Earth. They look like gigantic animal horns, but no one knows what they are or why they have appeared. I wanted to create an unsettling sense of mystery and tension with the music."

=== Controversy ===
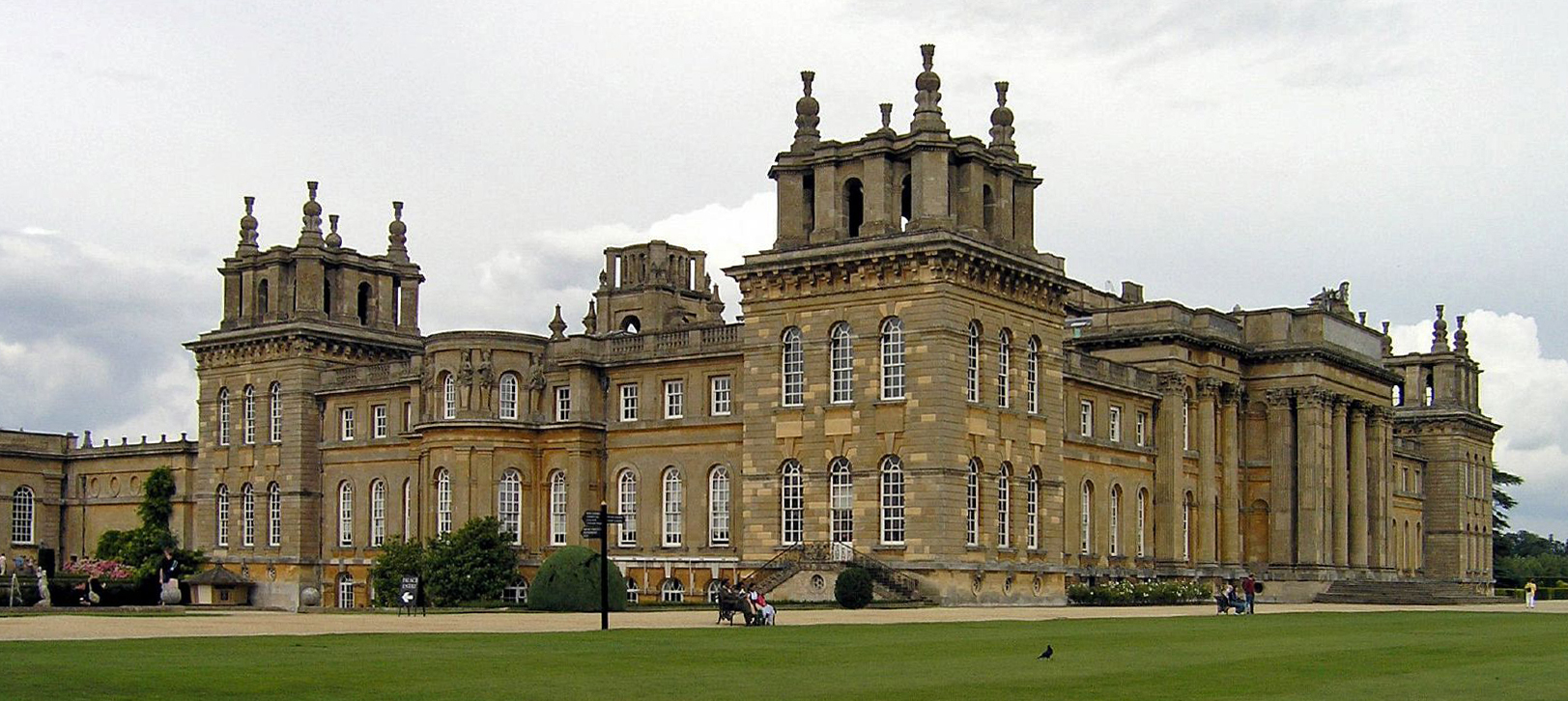
Blenheim Palace, where Britain's former wartime Prime Minister Sir Winston Churchill was born, was draped in huge Nazi flags.

On September 21, 2016, shooting for a particular scene took place in Blenheim Palace, Woodstock, Oxfordshire in England, the home of Sir Winston Churchill, the British Prime Minister during World War II. The mansion was dressed as a Nazi swastika-draped headquarters for Adolf Hitler for filming. This evoked both anger and criticism for being "symbolically disrespectful to Churchill", according to Colonel Richard Kemp, who said Churchill "will be turning in his grave", while Tony Hayes of the UK Veterans Association stated that surviving World War II ex-servicemen and women would be "appalled". Churchill's grandson and British Parliament member Sir Nicholas Soames dismissed the controversy entirely, stating, "They've no idea what my grandfather would have thought!" Churchill is buried less than a mile away, at St Martin's Church, Bladon.

== Release ==
=== Theatrical ===
Transformers: The Last Knight was released on June 21, 2017, after being moved up from its original June 23 release date.

=== Home media ===
Transformers: The Last Knight was released on Digital HD on September 12, 2017, and on Blu-ray, Blu-ray 4K, Blu-ray 3D and DVD on September 26, 2017, in North America. It was also released in a collection with the four previous films. The film grossed $36.3 million in home sales.

== Reception ==
=== Box office ===
Transformers: The Last Knight grossed $130.1 million in the United States and Canada and $475.3 million in other territories for a worldwide total of $605.4 million, against a production budget of $217–260 million. The film reportedly lost Paramount over $100 million and was deemed a commercial failure due to competition from Despicable Me 3, Wonder Woman, Spider-Man: Homecoming, War for the Planet of the Apes, and Dunkirk with the latter making the least in worldwide earnings when comparing the five films but Transformers: The Last Knight had the least total in North America.

In North America, The Last Knight was originally projected to gross $70–75 million from 4,069 theaters over its first five days, which would have been the lowest debut of the franchise. However, after the film grossed a franchise-low $15.7 million on its first day (including $5.5 million from Tuesday night previews), opening estimates were lowered to $60–65 million. On Thursday, it grossed $8.1 million, potentially dropping the five-day debut to under $60 million. It ended up having an opening weekend of $44.7 million, the lowest debut of the franchise by $25 million (and lowest since the first film's $70.5 million). The film's five-day gross of $68.5 million was also lower than every three-day opening of the previous four films. The film grossed $16.9 million in its second weekend, dropping 62.2% and finishing third at the box office, and $6.4 million in its third, dropping an identical 62.2% and finishing 5th.

Internationally, The Last Knight opened in its first 42 international territories alongside its United States debut, including major markets China, the UK, Russia, Australia, Germany, Italy, South Korea, and Hong Kong, and was projected to have an opening of $167–200 million. Due to its predecessor's success in China, expectations were high for the film in the country. Box office observers and trackers believed the film would open to $80–100 million, and end its run there with anywhere between $290 to $400 million. The film ended up having a global debut of $265.3 million ($196.2 million from other territories), including $123.4 million from China, representing 63% of the film's international opening. In the film's second week in China, it fell 76% and had a running cumulative total of $147.6 million. The film's largest markets outside North America were: China ($228.8 million), South Korea ($19.2 million), Russia ($15.9 million), Germany ($15.4 million), Mexico ($15.3 million), U.K. ($12.2 million), Brazil ($13.7 million), Indonesia ($11.7 million), Japan ($15.7 million) and France ($11 million).

=== Critical response ===
On Rotten Tomatoes, Transformers: The Last Knight has an approval rating of 16% based on 254 reviews and an average rating of 3.5/10, the lowest of the seven films in the Transformers series. The site's critical consensus reads, "Cacophonous, thinly plotted, and boasting state-of-the-art special effects, The Last Knight is pretty much what you'd expect from the fifth installment of the Transformers franchise." On Metacritic, the film has a weighted average score of 27 out of 100 based on 47 critics, indicating "generally unfavorable reviews". Audiences polled by CinemaScore gave the film an average grade of "B+" on an A+ to F scale, the same as Transformers: Revenge of the Fallen (2009), while PostTrak reported filmgoers gave a 75% overall positive score and a 55% "definite recommend".

Peter Travers of Rolling Stone gave the film a zero-star review, as he did to the previous films, saying "Every time Michael Bay directs another Transformers abomination (this is the fifth), the movies die a little. This one makes the summer's other blockbuster misfires look like masterpieces." Mike Ryan of Uproxx gave the film a negative review, criticizing its running time and incoherent plot, writing: "I have no proof Transformers: The Last Knight will kill your brain cells, but I wouldn't be surprised to learn that it does and I'd proceed with caution just in case. But I can say with absolute certainty that after watching, your head will hurt." Emily Yoshida of Vulture.com gave the film a negative review but wrote: "I feel slightly worried about how little I hated it." Yoshida thought it was marginally better than the previous film: "The Last Knight remains barely coherent. But it's more fun than "Age of Extinction", though both movies are so drunk on money and effects they accidentally go weird." Yoshida grudgingly praised the "visual and sonic imagination" shown by the filmmakers. Alonso Duralde of TheWrap was also critical of the film's sloppiness, saying, "...fear not, fans of the franchise: if you're here for the director's trademark chaos editing (where fights go from points A to D to Q), comedy scenes rendered tragic (and vice versa), and general full-volume confusion, you'll get all those things in abundance."

Peter Bradshaw of The Guardian gave it 1 out of 5, complained about the long runtime, and suggested the film was "competing with Marvel movies for spectacle" but without the "wit and fun". Christopher Orr of The Atlantic criticized the film for attempting to connect the Transformers to Stonehenge and World War II, and called it the worst retelling of Arthurian legend of the year, even worse than Guy Ritchie's King Arthur: Legend of the Sword. Rebecca Farley of Refinery29 and Dana Schwartz of Marie Claire were critical of the underdeveloped female characters. Farley noted the marketing made Moner appear to have a prominent role in the film, when she does not. Farley also labeled Haddock's character the film's "textbook Strong Woman" cliché. Schwartz criticizes Wahlberg's character for referring to Moner's as "Little J. Lo" because of her Latina heritage, and Haddock being portrayed as the "British Megan Fox". Schwartz also criticized the film for the frequent aspect ratio changes, and the runtime being too long. Ian Freer of Empire magazine rated the film 2 out of 5 stars. Freer said that like the previous films it "is bogged down in backstory, lacks a real feel for its characters and still can't find a way to make its robot-on-robot action exhilarating... It is amazing how a series with so much nostalgic goodwill, technical finesse and behind the scenes talent have led so often to experiences that are so joyless."

Variety's Owen Gleiberman gave the film a mixed review stating, "The fifth time may not quite be the charm, but the latest entry in Michael Bay's crunched-metal robot-war mega-series is badder, and therefore better." Richard Brody of The New Yorker acknowledged the film's flaws but noted there was almost something impressive about them, saying: "The absolute tastelessness of Bay's images, their stultifying service to platitudes and to merchandise, doesn't at all diminish their wildly imaginative power." Robbie Collin of The Telegraph wrote "If you're not staggered by the technique on display here – the stuff that sets Bay's work miles above the Fast & Furiouses, X-Men: Apocalypses and Tom Cruise-chasing Mummies of this world – you're not paying attention" and called it "a cinematic experience of earth-shattering preposterousness". Justin Chang of the Los Angeles Times wrote: "Bay's visual sensibility has, if anything, matured, to the point of demanding and earning your exasperated surrender." Joshua Rothkopf of Time Out New York gave it 3 out of 5, calling it "Clangorous and nonsensical" but "Regardless of our opinions, we all know what a Michael Bay film is. This one's his most Baysome."

=== Accolades ===
Transformers: The Last Knight led the 38th Golden Raspberry Awards season with 10 nominations (including The Razzie Nominee So Rotten You Loved It, Worst Picture, Worst Director, Worst Screen Combo, and Worst Screenplay) but did not win in any category, setting the record for most Razzie nominations without a win. It was nominated for Choice Action Movie, Choice Summer Movie, Choice Summer Movie Actor, and Choice Summer Movie Actress at the 2017 Teen Choice Awards. The film received nominations for Best Summer 2017 Blockbuster Trailer, Best Summer 2017 Blockbuster TV Spot (for a Feature Film), and Best TrailerByte for a Feature Film at the 2017 Golden Trailer Awards. At the Golden Reel Awards 2017, The Last Knight was nominated for Outstanding Achievement in Sound Editing – Feature Underscore.

== Future ==
=== Sequel ===
Akiva Goldsman was tasked with developing a multi-part sequel storyline, prequels, and spin-off films. Andrew Barrer and Gabriel Ferrari were hired to co-write a film that would explore the origins of Cybertron, with a working title of Transformers One. Before the release of The Last Knight, Michael Bay said it would be his last film as director in the franchise but expressed interest in remaining as a producer to continue the series with another director. Following the critical and commercial failure of The Last Knight, the series' future was uncertain, and by August 2017, Akiva Goldsman revealed he was no longer leading the writer's room and had left the franchise. Producer Lorenzo Di Bonaventura later said that the follow-up to The Last Knight would not be a sequel.

In an interview in September 2021, when asked about the possibility of a sequel to The Last Knight, Josh Duhamel had expressed interest in reprising his role as Colonel William Lennox. In June 2025, it was announced that Bay was attached to direct a new Transformers film based on an idea he had pitched to the studio, with Jordan VanDina writing the screenplay. In June 2026, it was reported that Jason Fuchs would write a script for one of several films that are in development. By October 2026, in addition to Fuchs confirmed as writer, Bay was in negotiations to return to a directorial role for a future Transformers film with executive producer Steven Spielberg signing on as its lead creative input, and di Bonaventura returning as producer.

=== Bumblebee (2018) ===
A prequel to the film series titled Bumblebee, starring Hailee Steinfeld and John Cena, was released on December 21, 2018, to a successful critical and financial reception.

In December 2018, producer Lorenzo Di Bonaventura announced that there will be further films in the series following the release of Bumblebee, acknowledging that the franchise will make some changes in their tone and style after the success of Bumblebee.

=== Transformers: Rise of the Beasts (2023) ===
A sequel to Bumblebee titled Transformers: Rise of the Beasts, starring Anthony Ramos and Dominique Fishback, was released on June 9, 2023.

By January 2020, a follow-up to Bumblebee and an adaptation of Transformers: Beast Wars were in development, written separately by Joby Harold and James Vanderbilt, respectively. The title, Transformers: Rise of the Beasts, was announced with plans for it to include parts of both storylines. The film was released to mixed reviews and was a box-office disappointment, though sequels were planned due to the open-ended nature of its ending. By October 2026, however, the sequel was cancelled.
