= Lamborghini Essenza SCV12 =

Track-day car produced by Lamborghini

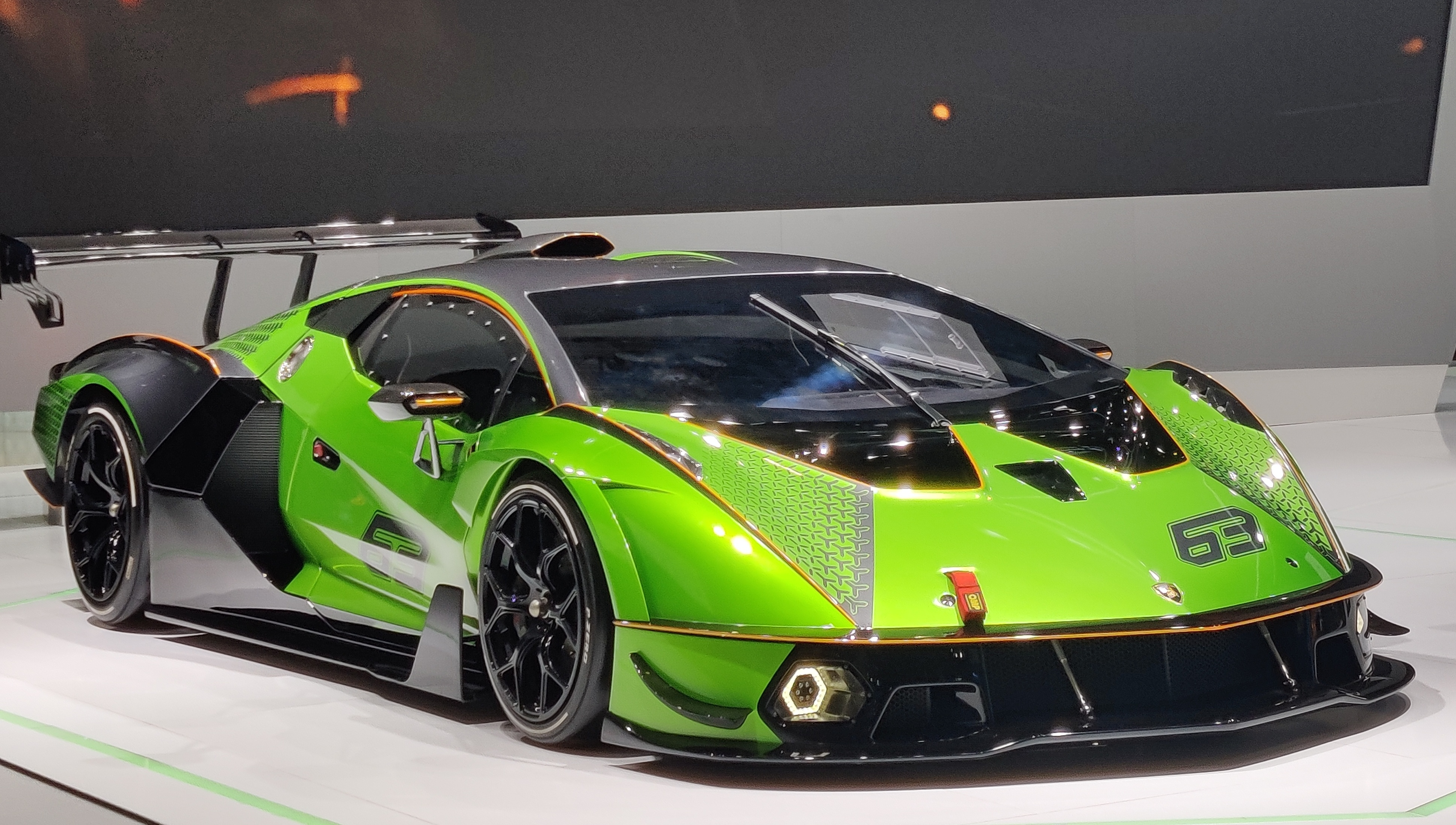

Overview
- Manufacturer: Lamborghini
- Production: 2020
- Assembly: Italy: Sant'Agata Bolognese
- Designer: Mitja Borkert

Body and chassis
- Class: Track day car
- Body style: 2-door coupe
- Layout: Rear mid-engine, rear-wheel-drive
- Doors: Scissor
- Related: Lamborghini Aventador

Powertrain
- Engine: 6.5 L L539 V12
- Power output: 830 PS (610 kW; 819 hp)
- Transmission: 6-speed Xtrac sequential manual

Dimensions
- Wheelbase: 2,905 mm (114.4 in)
- Kerb weight: 1,380 kg (3,042.4 lb) (dry)

The Lamborghini Essenza SCV12 is a track-only sports car produced by the Italian automobile manufacturer Lamborghini under their Squadra Corse racing division. Introduced on 29 July 2020, it was the most powerful and the last purely naturally-aspirated car built by the brand at the time.

== Specifications ==
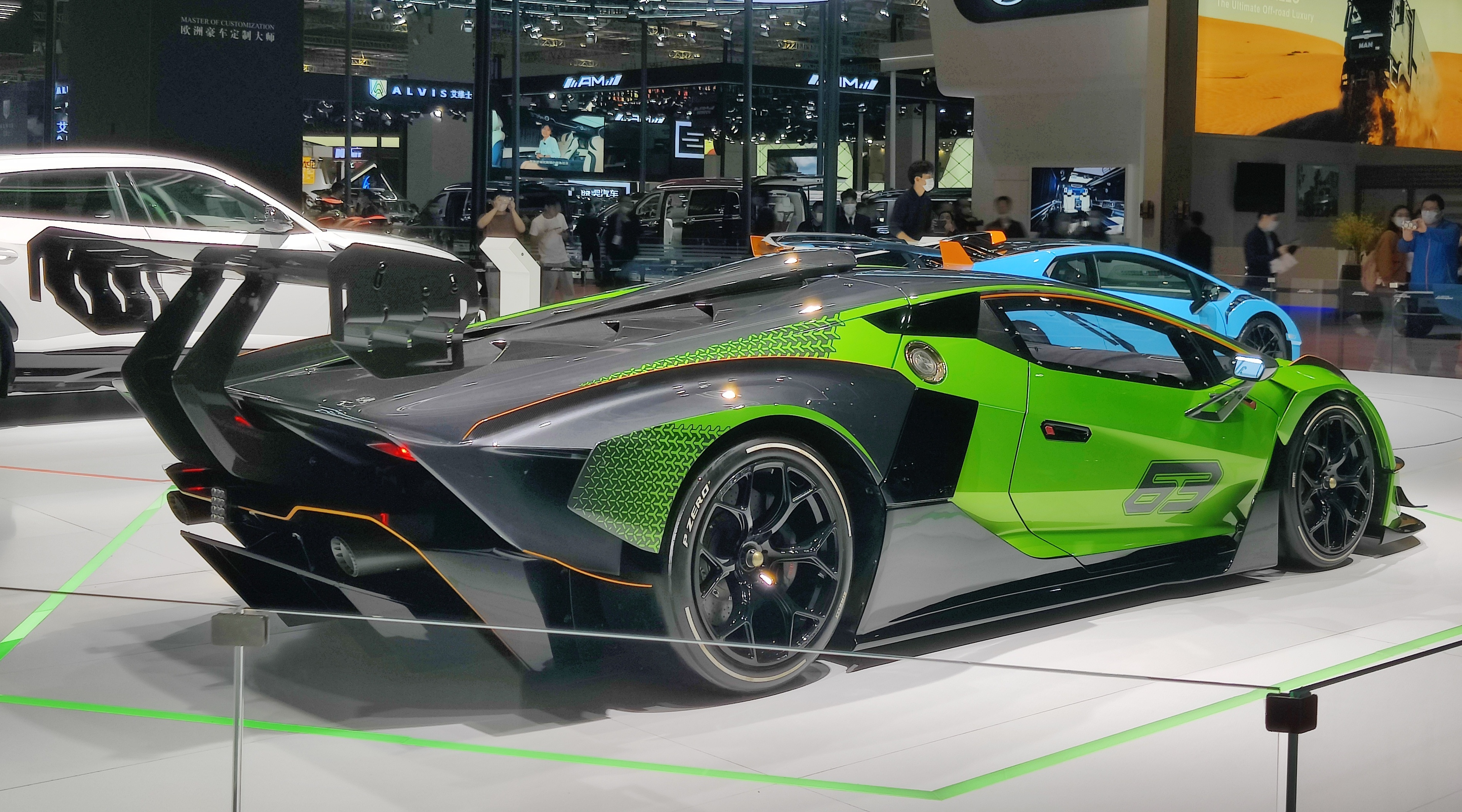
Essenza SCV12 rear 3/4 view

The Essenza SCV12 uses the same 6.5-litre V12 engine as the Aventador SVJ, tuned to the same specifications, but the engine has been turned 180-degrees to allow the gearbox to be mounted at the rear. The engine has a power output of 830 PS (610 kW; 819 hp) achieved by a ram air induction system, making it the most powerful naturally-aspirated engine made by the company. The car has special exhaust tips to reduce back pressure. Unlike the Aventador SVJ, the gearbox is a 6-speed non-synchromesh sequential unit, which also serves as a stressed member of the chassis by supporting the rear pushrod suspension. The car has a rear-wheel-drive layout, as opposed to Lamborghini's current V12 powered offerings. The car is 136 kg (300 lb) lighter than the Aventador SVJ and features a FIA approved carbon composite crash structure and a carbon fibre monocoque which is the first to be homologated without the use of metal. The Essenza SCV12 is also the first car to be developed according to the FIA prototype safety rules. The car has a power-to-weight ratio of 1.66 kg per hp (mistakenly written as "hp per kg" in Lamborghini's press release).

== Design ==
The Essenza SCV12 features aerodynamics inspired by racing prototypes and was developed for exclusive track use. Its aggressive design language helps it generate downforce northwards of 1,200 kg (2,600 lb) at 249 km/h (155 mph), equivalent to a conventional GT3 racing car. The front splitter and a large rear wing aids in providing downforce. The hood manages airflow into the roof mounted air snorkel cooling the engine. The car comes with Brembo disk brakes and is fitted with Pirelli racing slicks, having 19-inch wheels at the front and 20-inch magnesium wheels at the rear.

Inspired by Huracán racing models, the Essenza SCV12 uses dual-inlets and a center rib in the front hood, directing airflow to the ram-air roof scoop to increase static air pressure in the engine’s intake manifold. This creates a greater airflow through the engine and ultimately, increases power output. Recognized as "aerodynamic supercharging" by Lamborghini, this technology allows the car the produce more power as speed increases.

== Production ==
Production of the Essenza SCV12 is limited to 40 units. The car is not legal for road use and is planned to have its own one-make racing series. The cars will be stored in a special hangar built near the Sant'Agata factory with the owners having the ability to monitor their cars via an app linked to security cameras. Lamborghini would let the customer take delivery of their car upon request, akin to Maserati who allowed customers to take delivery of the MC12 Versione Corse. Lamborghini is responsible for the maintenance and transportation of the cars to any one of the FIA class 1 tracks around the world, in the case that the owner does not wish to keep the car. Customers can also receive coaching from Lamborghini racing drivers Emanuele Pirro and Marco Mapelli.

Deliveries of the Essenza SCV12 started in December 2020.
