= Lamborghini Centenario =

Sports car

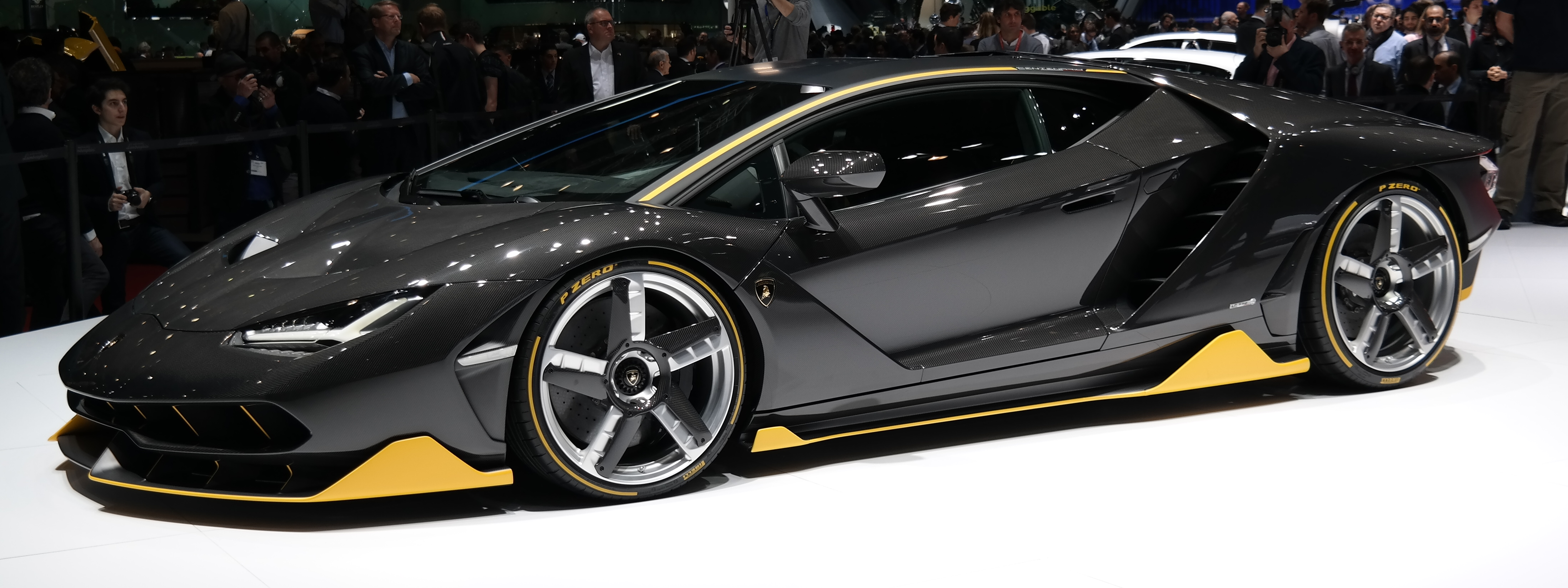
- Lamborghini Centenario coupé

Overview
- Manufacturer: Lamborghini
- Production: 2016–2017; (20 coupés and 20 roadsters)
- Assembly: Italy: Sant'Agata Bolognese
- Designer: Filippo Perini (coupé); Mitja Borkert (roadster)

Body and chassis
- Class: Sports car (S)
- Body style: 2-door coupé; 2-door roadster
- Layout: Mid-engine, all-wheel-drive
- Doors: Scissor
- Related: Lamborghini Aventador

Powertrain
- Engine: 6.5 L L539 V12
- Power output: 770 PS (566 kW; 759 hp)
- Transmission: 7-speed ISR automated manual

Dimensions
- Wheelbase: 2,700 mm (106.3 in)
- Length: 4,924 mm (193.9 in)
- Width: 2,062 mm (81.2 in)
- Height: 1,143 mm (45.0 in)
- Curb weight: Coupé: 1,520 kg (3,351 lb) (dry); 1,675 kg (3,693 lb) (with fluids); Roadster: 1,570 kg (3,461 lb) (dry); 1,725 kg (3,803 lb) (with fluids)

The Lamborghini Centenario (Italian: [tʃenteˈnaːrjo], Spanish: [θenteˈnaɾjo]) is a limited production sports car based on the Lamborghini Aventador which was unveiled at the 2016 Geneva Motor Show to commemorate the 100th birthday of the company's founder, Ferruccio Lamborghini.

== Development and introduction ==
Lamborghini developed the Centenario to showcase the advancement of new technologies and also as a test bed for the development of new Lamborghini models.

The Centenario is the first Lamborghini model to have three exhausts and to be deployed with rear-wheel steering. The system is designed to provide added maneuverability at low speed, in a city driving environment, and improved stability at high speed.

This is also the first Lamborghini model to be equipped with the company's new infotainment system. The system consists of a new 10.1-inch portrait screen which also records telemetry, driving data and top speeds.

The car's all-new bodywork from the Aventador also serves as a base for showcasing the new aerodynamic advancements. A twin-deck splitter at the front helps in generating downforce as well as to let air pass through the side of the car while working in conjunction with the side blades. The Centenario also has the largest rear diffusers to ever be incorporated into a car. The diffusers along with the electronically controlled twin deck rear-wing aids further in generating downforce. The car generates 227 kg (500 lb) of downforce at 280 km/h (174 mph).

In 2018, 11 of the 40 Centenarios were recalled due to having been fitted with an improper weight rating label.

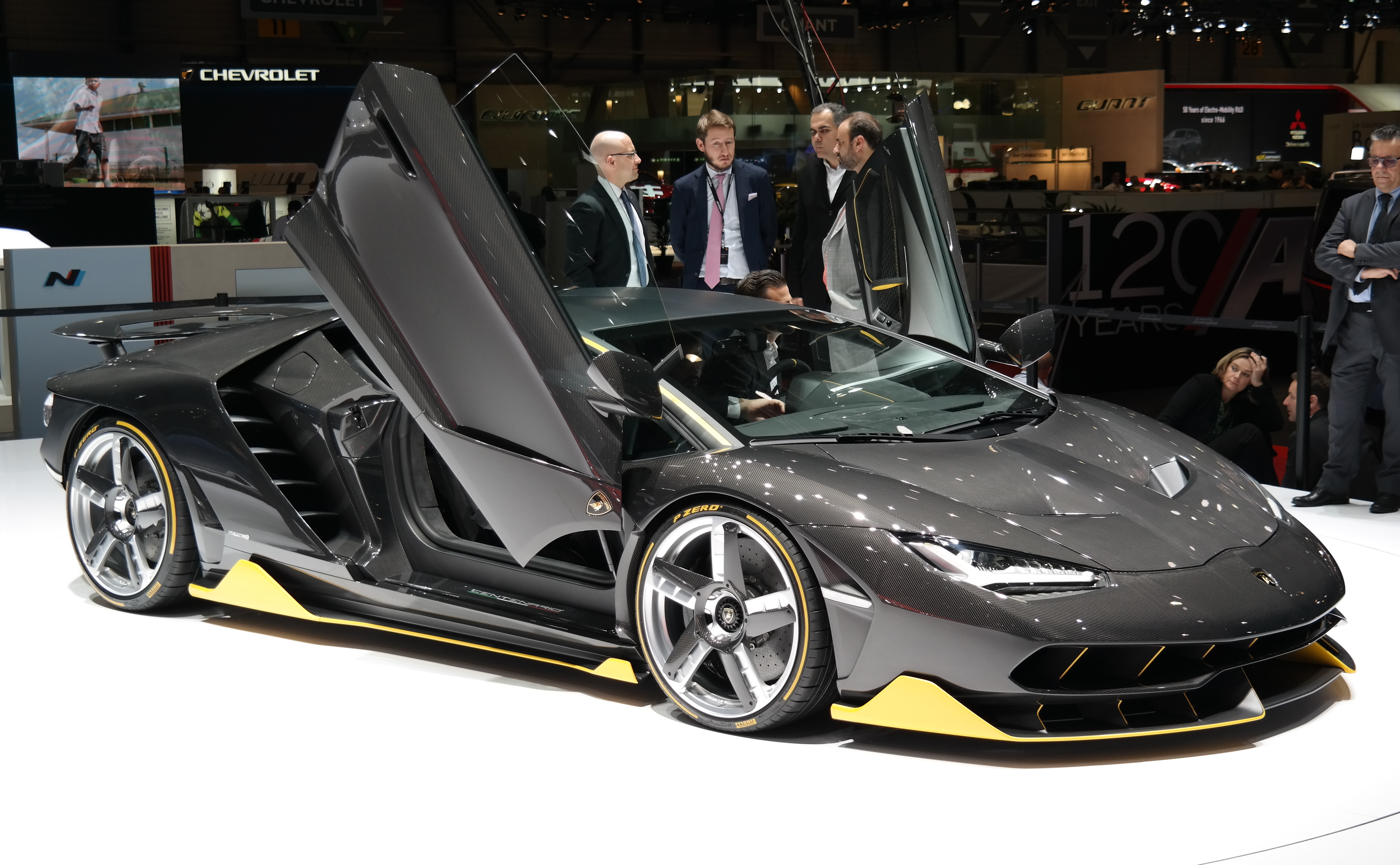
Centenario with the doors open at the 2016 Geneva Motor Show

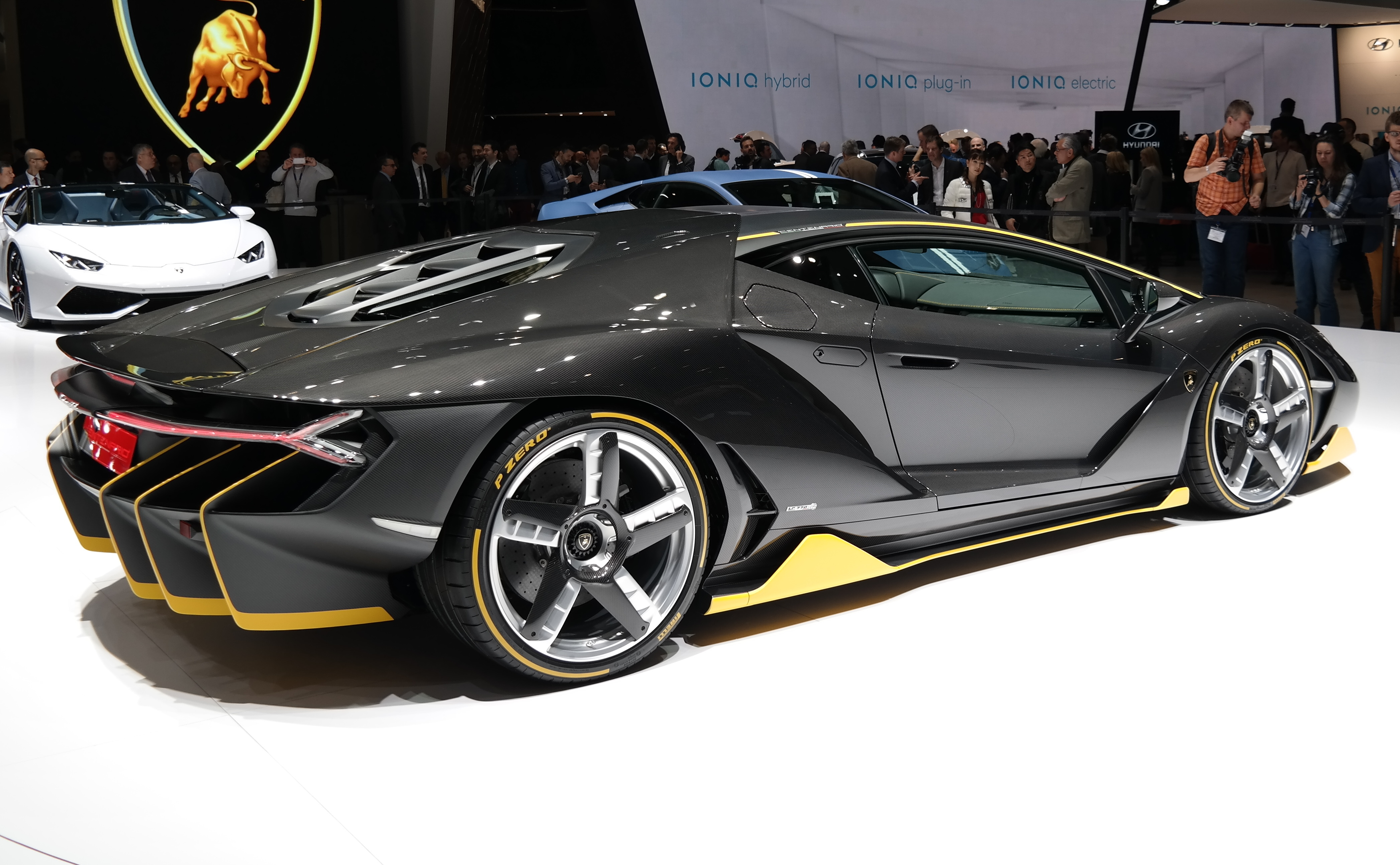
Rear view

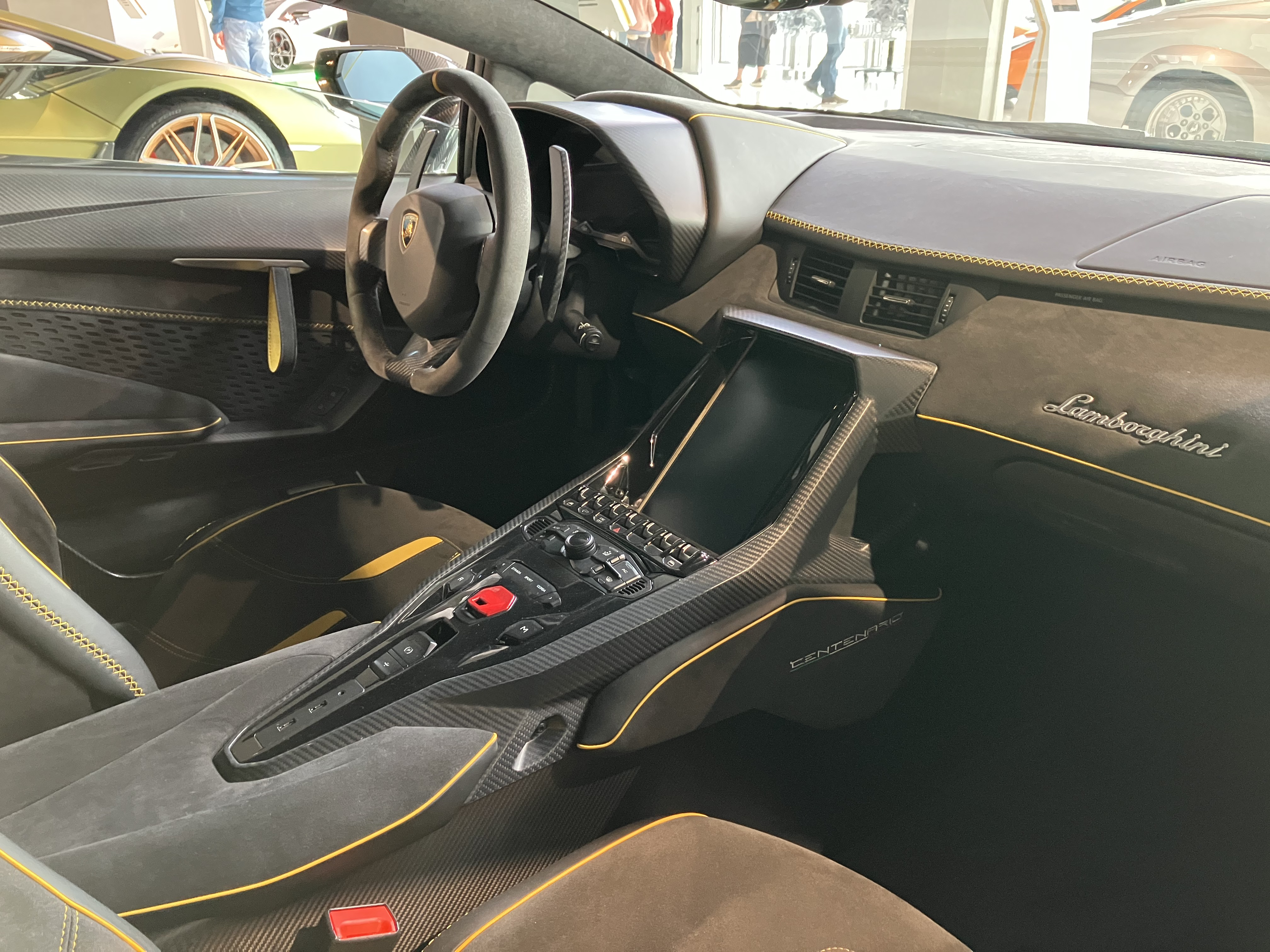
Centenario interior at the Lamborghini Museum

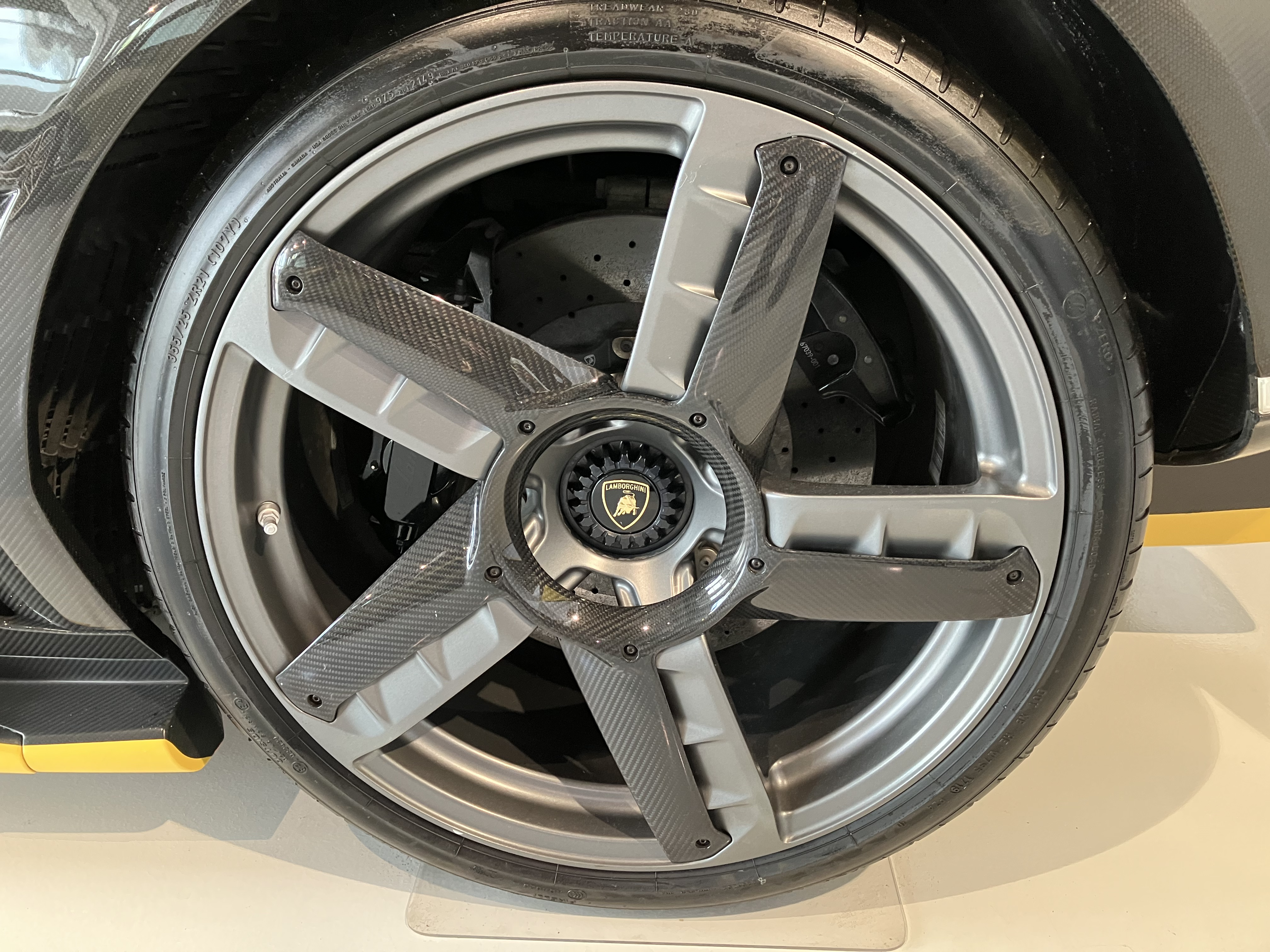
Centenario center locking wheel with carbon blades and Pirelli P Zero 355/25 ZR21

== Specifications ==
The Centenario is based on the Aventador SV and retains the carbon-fibre monocoque along with aluminium front and rear subframes from the standard Aventador. Power comes from a tuned version of the Aventador's 6.5-litre V12 generating 770 PS (566 kW; 759 hp) at 8,500 rpm and 690 N⋅m (509 lb⋅ft) of torque at 5,500 rpm, therefore increasing power over the Aventador SV by 20 PS (15 kW; 20 hp). The Centenario also has a slight weight reduction compared with the Aventador of 5 kg (11 lb).

The engine is mated to the same 7-speed ISR automated manual gearbox as used on an Aventador along with the all-wheel-drive drivetrain developed by Haldex. The power steering has two turns lock-to-lock. The suspension system is a push-rod design.

The car has three driving modes, namely, "Strada" (for normal city driving), "Sport" (for high performance driving) and "Corsa" (for optimum track performance). The car comes with either leather or Alcantara upholstery on the interior mostly carried over from the Aventador, customizable to the customer's specifications. The interior has a carbon fibre trim along with carbon fibre shift paddles and has sound deadening materials removed.

== Performance ==
The Centenario can accelerate from 0–100 km/h (0–62 mph) in 2.9 seconds, 0–300 km/h (0–186 mph) in 23.5 seconds and has a top speed of 350 km/h (217 mph).

The Centenario has a power to weight ratio of 2.21 kg (4.87 lb) per horsepower and a braking distance of 30 m (98 ft) from 100–0 km/h (62–0 mph).

== Centenario Roadster ==
Centenario Roadster

Lamborghini unveiled the Centenario Roadster at the August 2016 Pebble Beach Concours d'Elegance. The only change from the coupé counterpart is the weight of the car, which is now set to at least 1,570 kg (3,461 lb) due to the loss of the roof and the addition of chassis reinforcing components. Performance remains the same as that of the coupé. The Centenario Roadster was also capable of a 217 mph top speed and accelerating from 0-100 kph (62 mph) in 2.9 seconds.

== Production ==
A total of 40 cars, (20 coupes and 20 roadsters) were produced, all of which were already sold via invitation to selected customers.
