= Lamborghini Veneno =

Limited edition sports car produced by Lamborghini

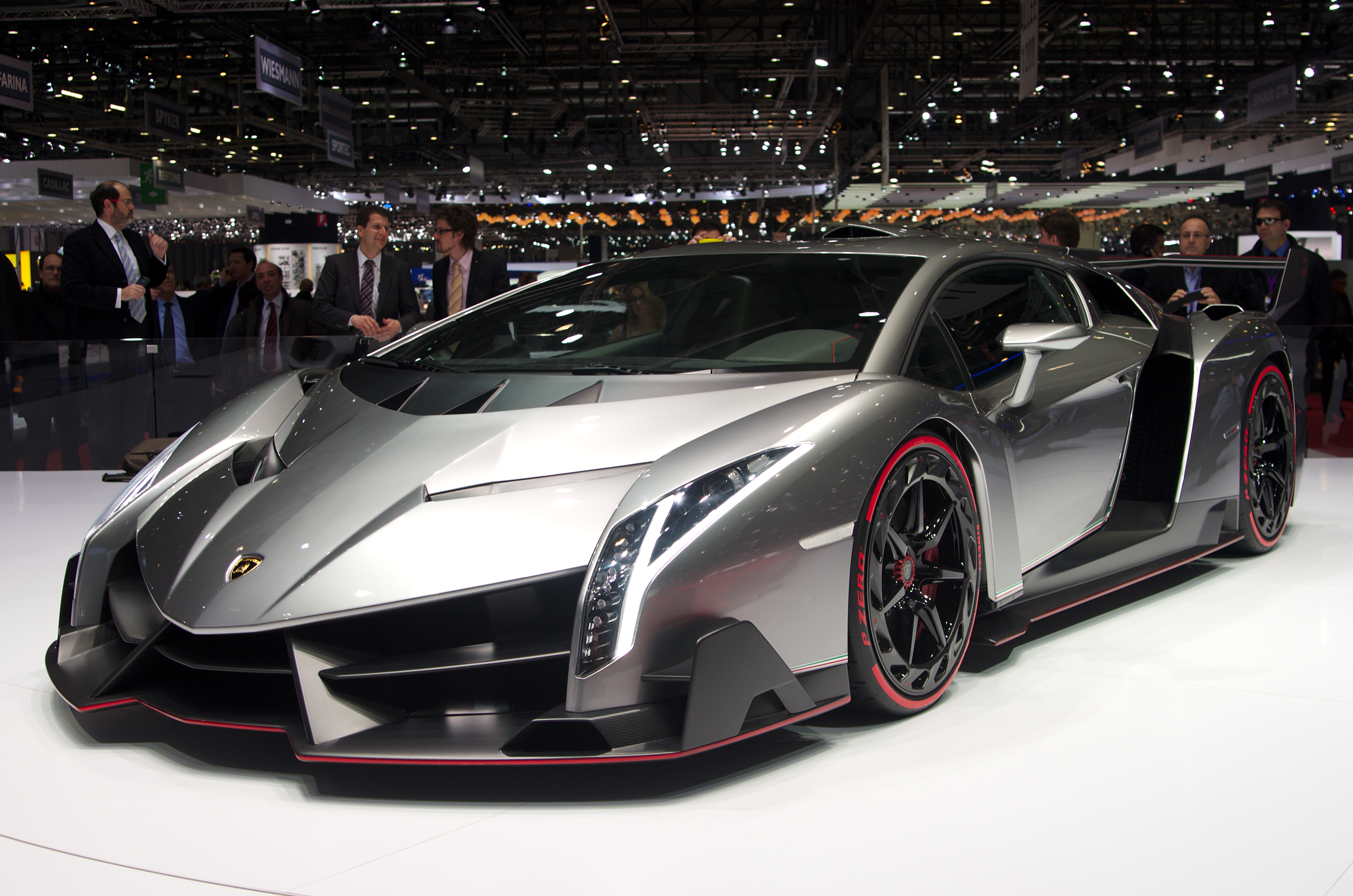

Overview
- Manufacturer: Lamborghini
- Production: 2013–2014 (3 coupés, 9 roadsters)
- Assembly: Italy: Sant'Agata Bolognese
- Designer: Filippo Perini; Michele Tinazzo

Body and chassis
- Class: Sports car (S)
- Body style: 2-door coupé; 2-door roadster
- Layout: Mid-engine, all-wheel-drive
- Doors: Scissor
- Related: Lamborghini Aventador

Powertrain
- Engine: 6.5 L L539 V12
- Power output: 750 PS (552 kW; 740 hp)
- Transmission: 7-speed ISR automated manual

Dimensions
- Wheelbase: 2,700 mm (106.3 in)
- Length: 5,020 mm (197.6 in)
- Width: 2,075 mm (81.7 in)
- Height: 1,165 mm (45.9 in)
- Curb weight: 1,490 kg (3,285 lb) (Roadster; dry) 1,450 kg (3,197 lb) (Coupe; dry)

The Lamborghini Veneno (Spanish pronunciation: [beˈneno], lit. 'poison') is a limited production high performance sports car manufactured by Italian automobile manufacturer Lamborghini. Based on the Aventador, the Veneno was developed to celebrate Lamborghini's 50th anniversary. It was introduced at the 2013 Geneva Motor Show. When introduced, it had a price of US$4,000,000, making it one of the most expensive production cars in the world.

== Specifications ==
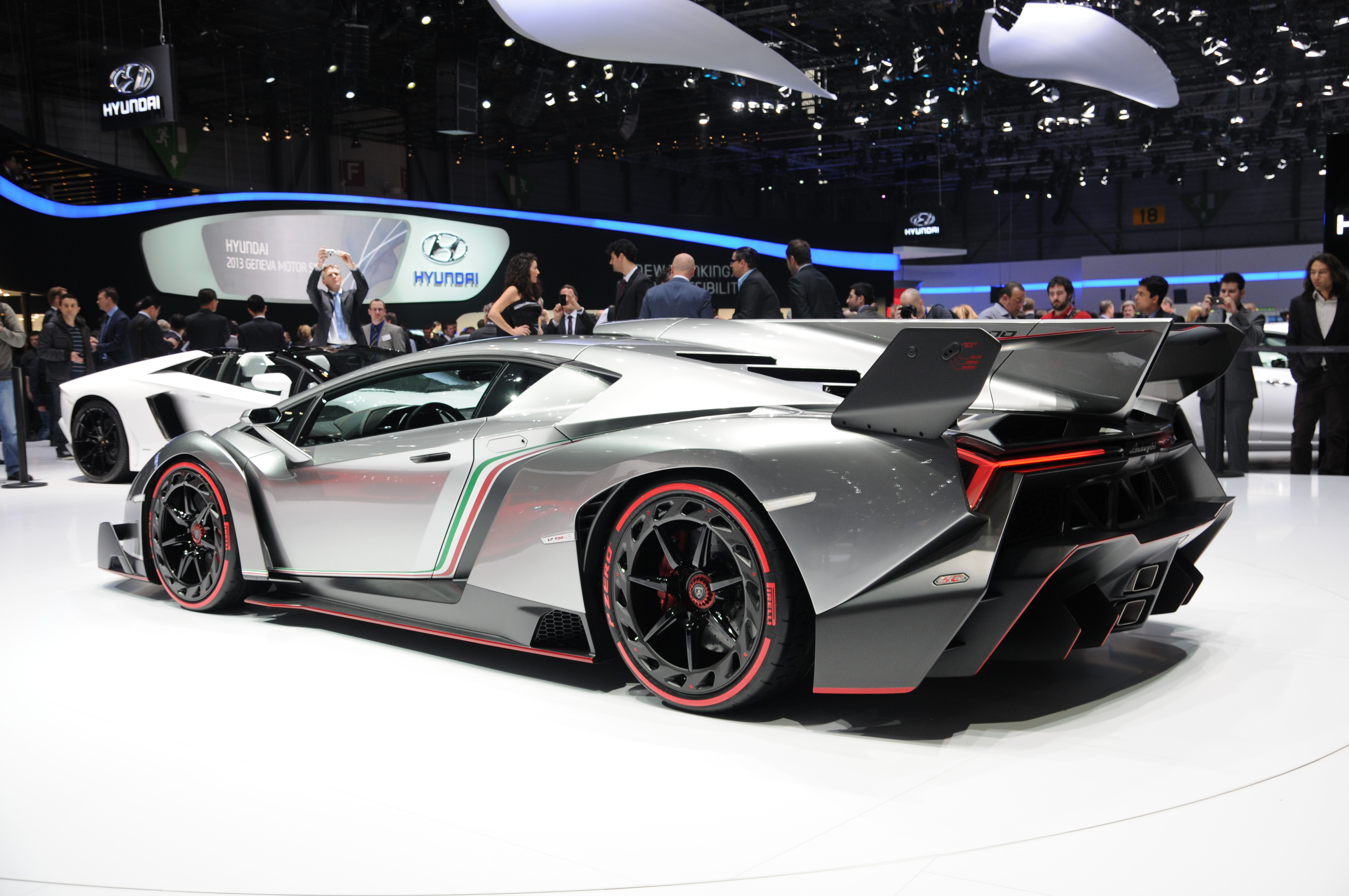
Rear view

The engine is a development of the Aventador's 6.5-litre V12 and generates a power output of 750 PS (552 kW; 740 hp) at 8,400 rpm and 690 N⋅m (509 lb⋅ft) of torque at 5,500 rpm. The increase in power was achieved by enlarging the air intakes and modifying the exhaust system.

The Veneno is Lamborghini's interpretation of a racing prototype built for the road. The front of the car is designed for maximum airflow and improved downforce. The redesigned front and rear arches direct air around the car in order to reduce excessive lift and aid in generating downforce. The smooth underbody ensures that the airflow is not interrupted. The large carbon-fibre rear wing connected to the car via an LMP-style central fin is three-way adjustable. The wheels of the car (measuring 20-inch at the front and 21-inch at the rear) have a turbine-like design and direct air to cool the car's carbon ceramic braking system. The center lock wheels allow for easy installation and removal. The car utilises Pirelli P-Zero tyres.

The Veneno retains the carbon-fibre monocoque chassis with aluminium front and rear subframe from the Aventador along with the pushrod suspension system. The interior is based largely on the Aventador's interior, but now incorporates the "carbon skin" element introduced on the Aventador J. The 7-speed ISR automated manual transmission is also retained from the Aventador and includes a new "track" setting for improved performance on a race track.

The design of the Veneno is a large departure from the previous styling of Lamborghini models. The design is inspired by Sports prototypes and racing cars. The Y-shaped design elements are a carryover from the Aventador's design language while the rear wheel arches hark back to the Countach. The vented engine cover improves cooling to the engine, while the extreme aerodynamic elements present on the car signify its track-focused characteristics. It has a top speed of 356 km/h (221 mph) and has a 0–97 km/h (0–60 mph) acceleration time of 2.8 seconds. The car has a braking distance of 30 m (98.0 ft) from 97–0 km/h (60–0 mph), and can produce 1.41 G while cornering.

=== Veneno Roadster ===
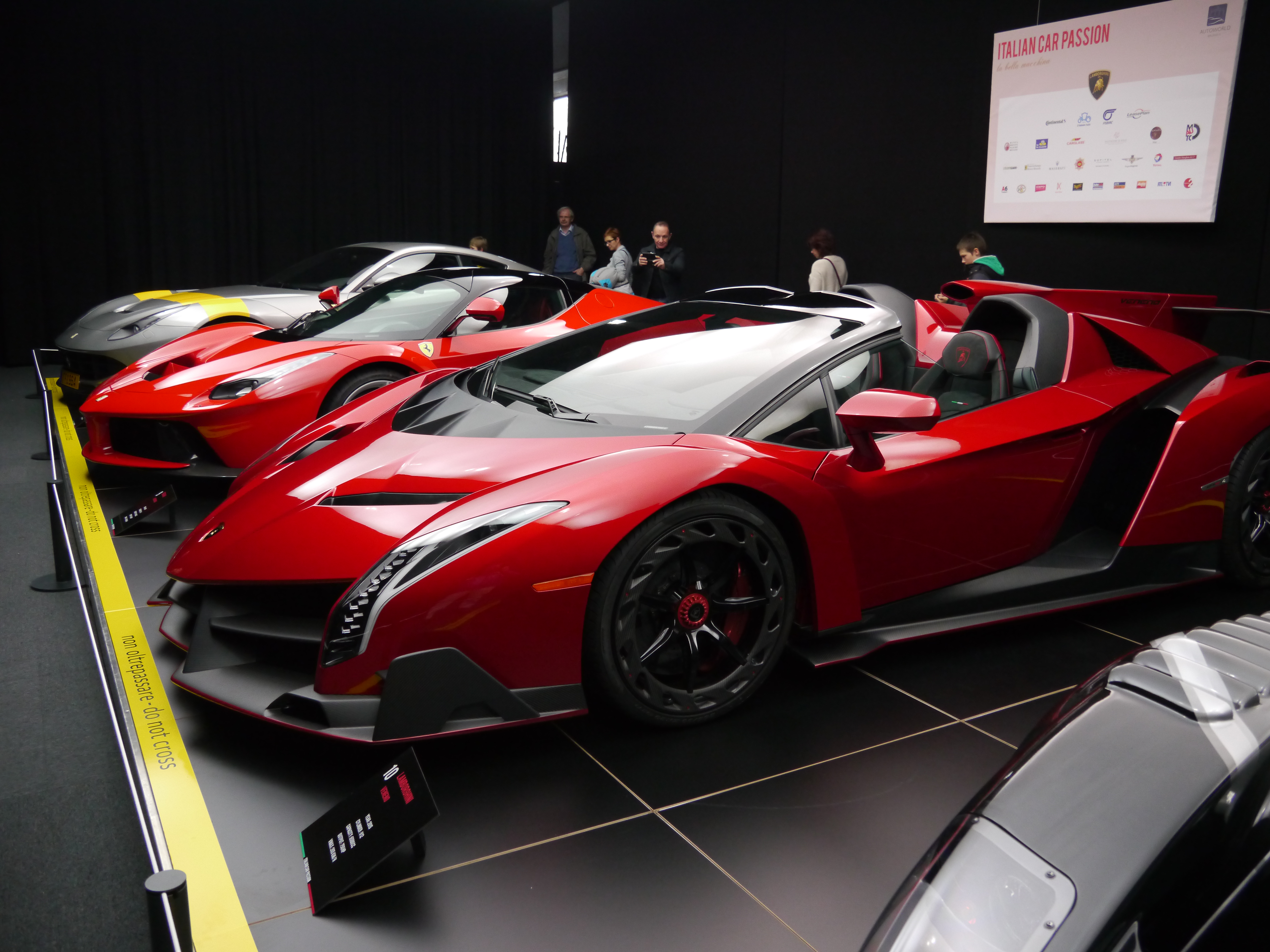
Lamborghini Veneno Roadster at Autoworld in Brussels

The roadster variant of the Lamborghini Veneno was unveiled on the Italian naval aircraft carrier Cavour docked in Abu Dhabi's Mina Zayed port on December 1st, 2013, followed by the 2014 Las Vegas Consumer Electronics Show. Performance of the roadster remains identical to that of the coupé, with the roadster being 50 kg (110.2 lb) heavier than the coupé counterpart due to chassis reinforcing components. The roadster went on sale for €3,300,000 (excluding tax).

== Production ==
Lamborghini built just four examples of the Veneno Coupé: one retained for the factory museum, and three cars for customers which were all painted in Grigio Metalluro with either a red, green, or white accent (the colors of the Italian flag). In addition to the coupé, nine units of the roadster were produced which could be completely customized to the customer's desire.
