= Museo Lamborghini =

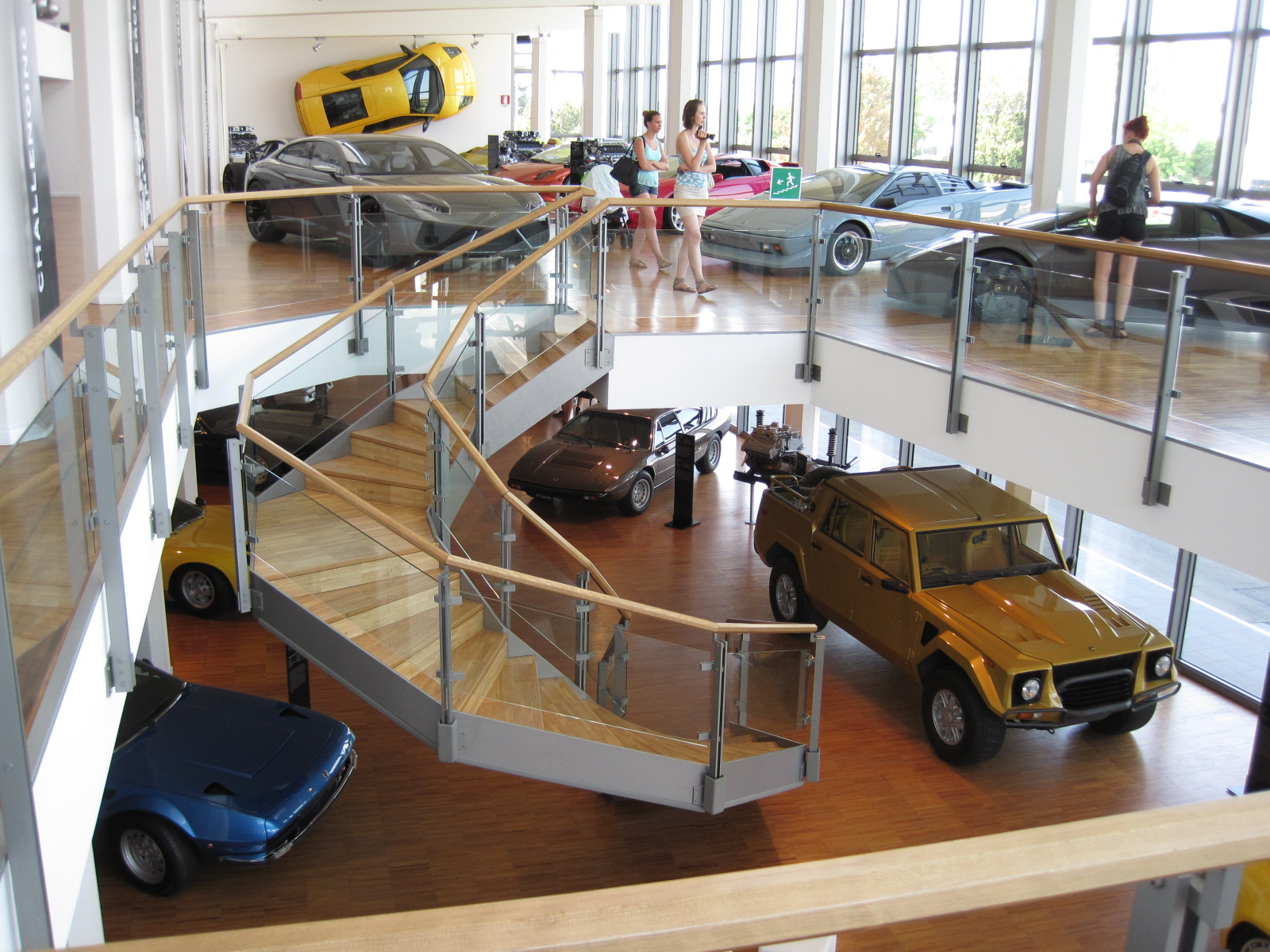

- Location within Emilia-Romagna Location within Italy
- Established: 2001; 25 years ago
- Location: Via Modena 12; 40019 Sant'Agata Bolognese; Italy
- Coordinates: 44°39′32″N 11°07′34″E
- Type: Automobile museum
- Website: Museo Lamborghini

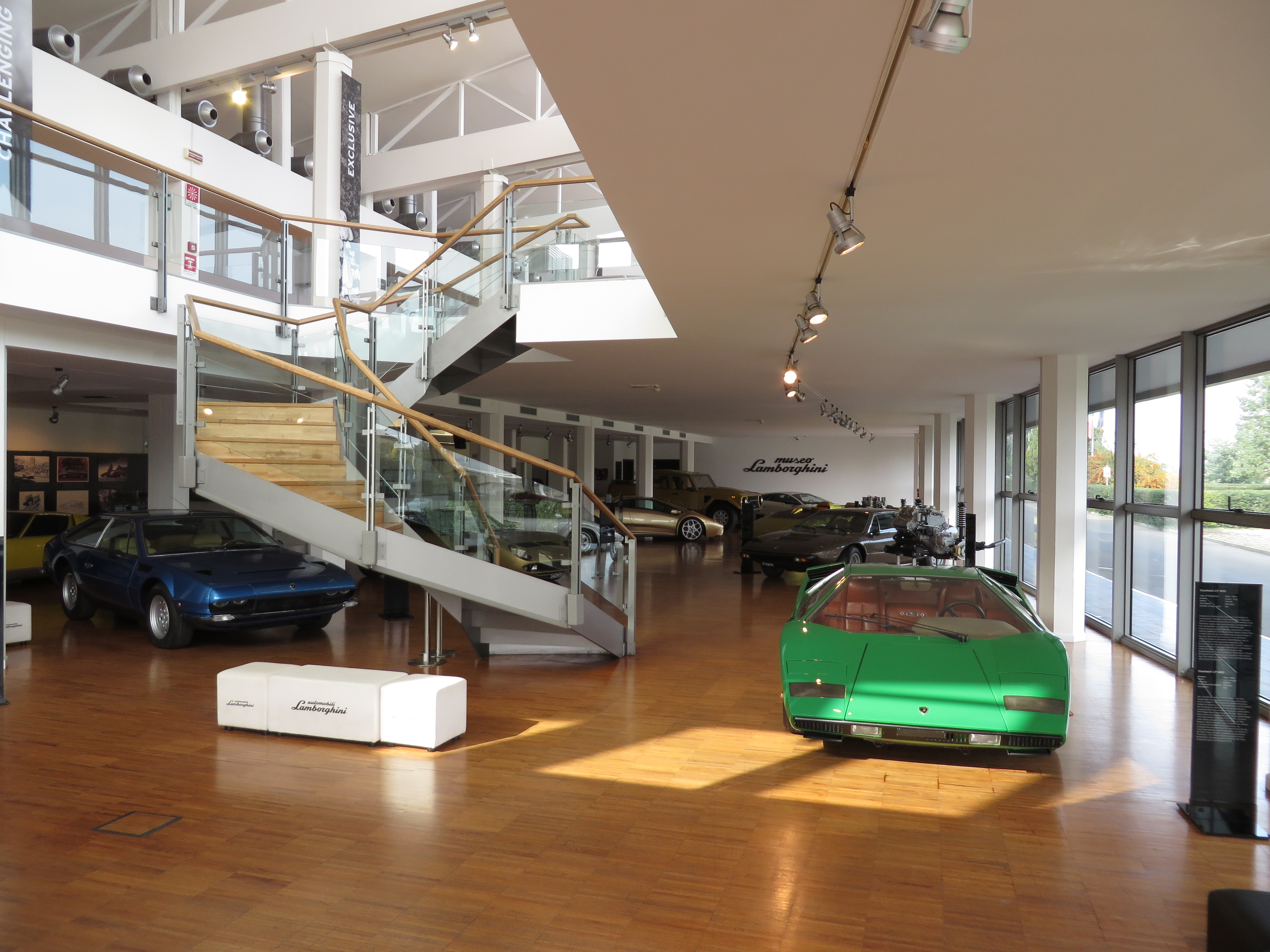
Museo Lamborghini

The Museo Lamborghini (or Lamborghini Museum) is an automobile museum owned and operated by Automobili Lamborghini S.p.A. in Sant'Agata Bolognese, Emilia-Romagna, Italy. The two-storey museum opened in 2001, and was renovated in June 2016 to provide exhibit space for more models. The goal of the museum is to cover all major milestones in the Lamborghini's history. For this purpose, the museum displays a family tree that shows all the models ever produced by the company. The current gallery contains supercars such as the 350 GT and the Sesto Elemento, and one-off and concept cars such as the Veneno and the Miura concept.

== See also ==
- List of automobile museums
