= Alar (disambiguation) =

Alar is the common term for Daminozide, a chemical compound that serves as a plant growth regulator.

Alar may also refer to:

== Anatomy ==
- Alar ligament, a connection between head and neck
- Alar fascia, a layer of fascia
- Alar plate (also known as alar lamina), a neural structure in the embryonic nervous system

== People ==
- Alar Kaljuvee (born 1961), Estonian volleyball coach
- Alar Karis (born 1958), biologist, civil servant, politician and sixth President of Estonia
- Alar Kotli (1904–1963), Estonian architect
- Alar Laneman (born 1962), Estonian politician
- Alar Nääme (born 1983), Estonian politician
- Alar Rikberg (born 1981), Estonian indiaca player and volleyball coach
- Alar Seim (born 1958), Estonian weightlifter and coach
- Alar Sikk (born 1966), Estonian alpinist
- Alar Streimann (born 1964), Estonian diplomat
- Alar Toomre (born 1937), Estonian American astronomer and mathematician
- Alar Varrak (born 1982), Estonian basketball player and coach
- Deni Alar (born 1990), Croatian Austrian football player

== Places ==
- Allar, Jalilabad (also known as Alar), a village and municipality in Jalilabad Rayon, Azerbaijan
- Allar, Yardymli (also known as Alar), a village and municipality in Yardymli Rayon, Azerbaijan
- Aral, Xinjiang (also known as Alaer), a city in Xinjiang, China
- Alar del Rey, a municipality in Palencia, Castile and León, Spain

== Other uses ==
- Lamborghini Alar, a mid-engined sports car produced by Lamborghini LatinoAmerica
