= Lamborghini Revuelto =

Successor to the Lamborghini Aventador

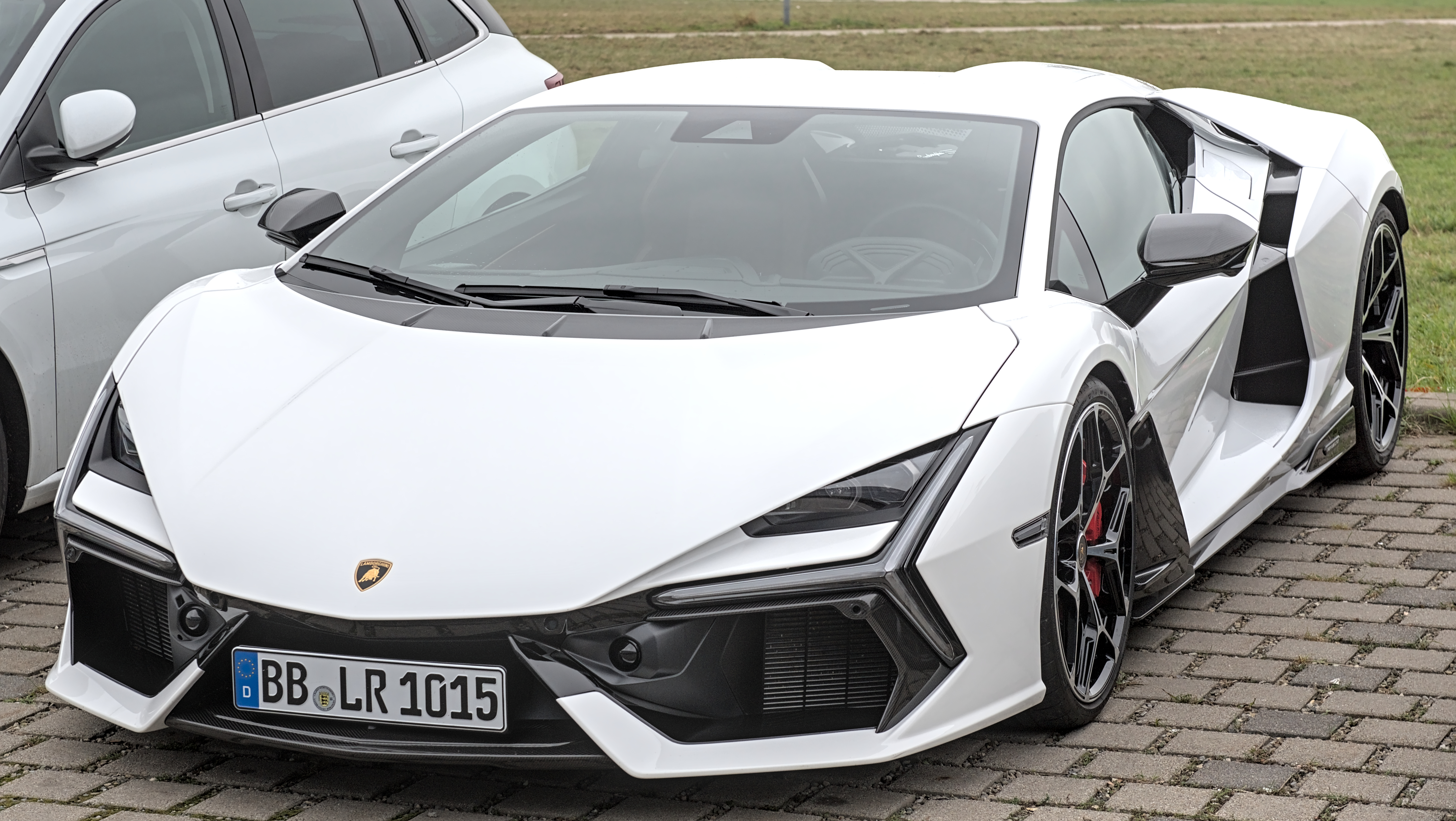

Overview
- Manufacturer: Lamborghini
- Also called: LB744 (internal codename)
- Production: 2023–present
- Model years: 2024–present
- Assembly: Italy: Sant'Agata Bolognese
- Designer: Mitja Borkert

Body and chassis
- Class: Sports car (S)
- Body style: 2-door coupé
- Layout: Mid-engine, all-wheel-drive
- Doors: Scissor
- Related: Lamborghini Fenomeno

Powertrain
- Engine: 6.5 L (6,498 cc) L545 naturally aspirated V12
- Electric motor: 3× permanent magnet motors
- Power output: V12 engine: 814 hp (825 PS) at 9,250 rpm 535 lb⋅ft (725 N⋅m) at 6,750 rpm; Electric motor (combined): 187 hp (190 PS) 248 lb⋅ft (336 N⋅m); Total output: 1,001 hp (1,015 PS) 783 lb⋅ft (1,062 N⋅m)
- Transmission: 8-speed Graziano dual-clutch automatic
- Hybrid drivetrain: PHEV
- Battery: 3.8 kWh lithium-ion high specific power battery with pouch cells

Dimensions
- Wheelbase: 2,779 mm (109.4 in)
- Length: 4,947 mm (194.8 in)
- Width: 2,266 mm (89.2 in) (incl. mirrors); 2,033 mm (80.0 in) (body)
- Height: 1,160 mm (45.7 in)
- Kerb weight: 1,772 kg (3,907 lb) dry 1,880 kg (4,145 lb) kerb

Chronology
- Predecessor: Lamborghini Aventador

The Lamborghini Revuelto (Spanish pronunciation: [reˈβwelto]) is a mid-engine plug-in hybrid sports car produced by the Italian automobile manufacturer Lamborghini. It was officially unveiled on 29 March 2023 as a successor to the Aventador. The Revuelto's namesake is a Spanish fighting bull that fought in the arena of Barcelona in the 1880s.

The Revuelto entered full production by July 2023, with the first units being delivered in the last quarter of 2023.

== History ==
Logo

Lamborghini teased the car on March 22, 2023 on a Twitter post, and was unveiled in an online event on 29 March 2023. The car is the first of the brand to adopt a plug-in hybrid propulsion system. While models like the Sián FKP 37 and Countach LPI 800-4 had utilised a mild form of a hybrid propulsion system, mainly to improve low-speed drivability, the Revuelto is the first Lamborghini to make use of a true form of a hybrid drivetrain.

== Design ==
=== Exterior ===
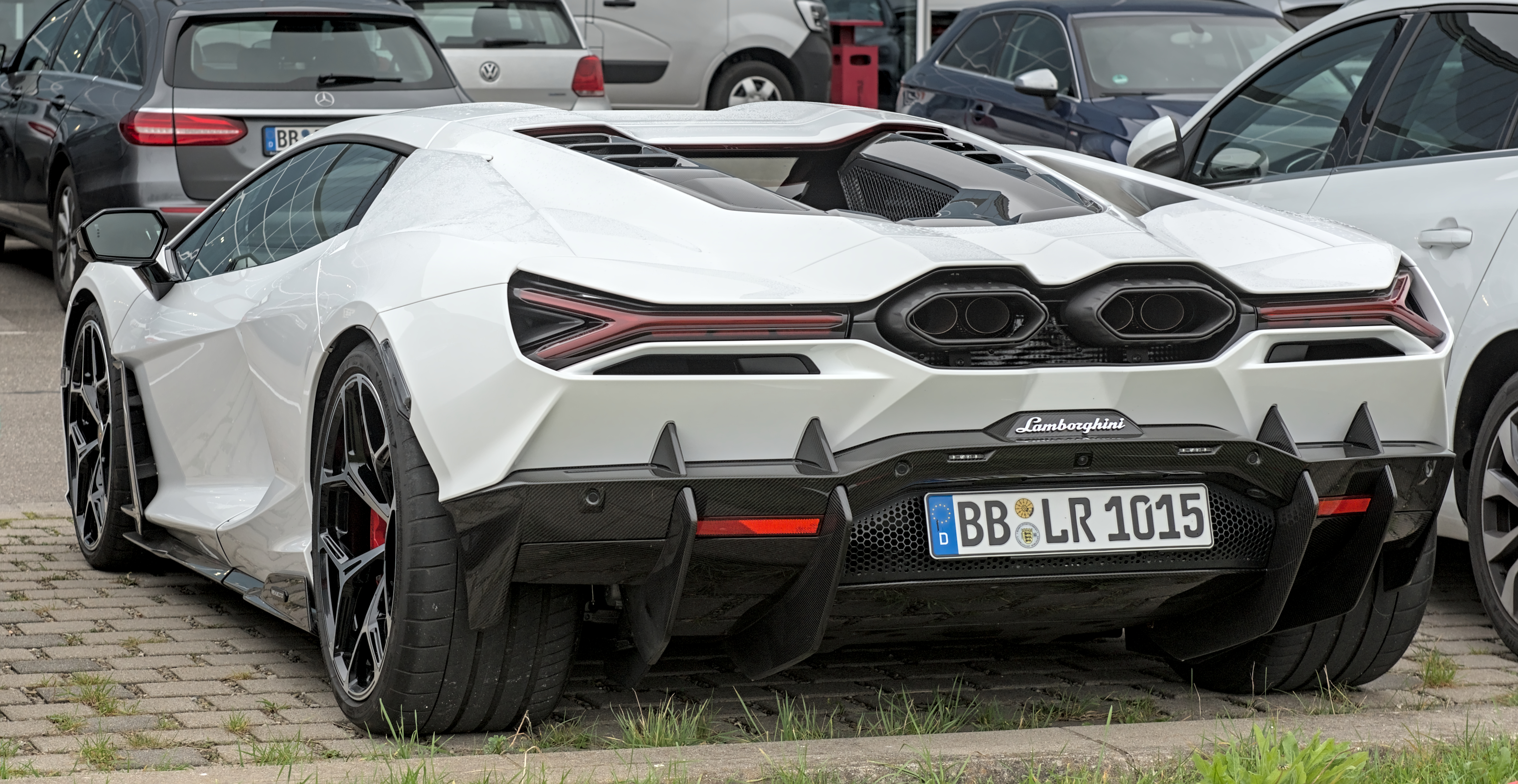

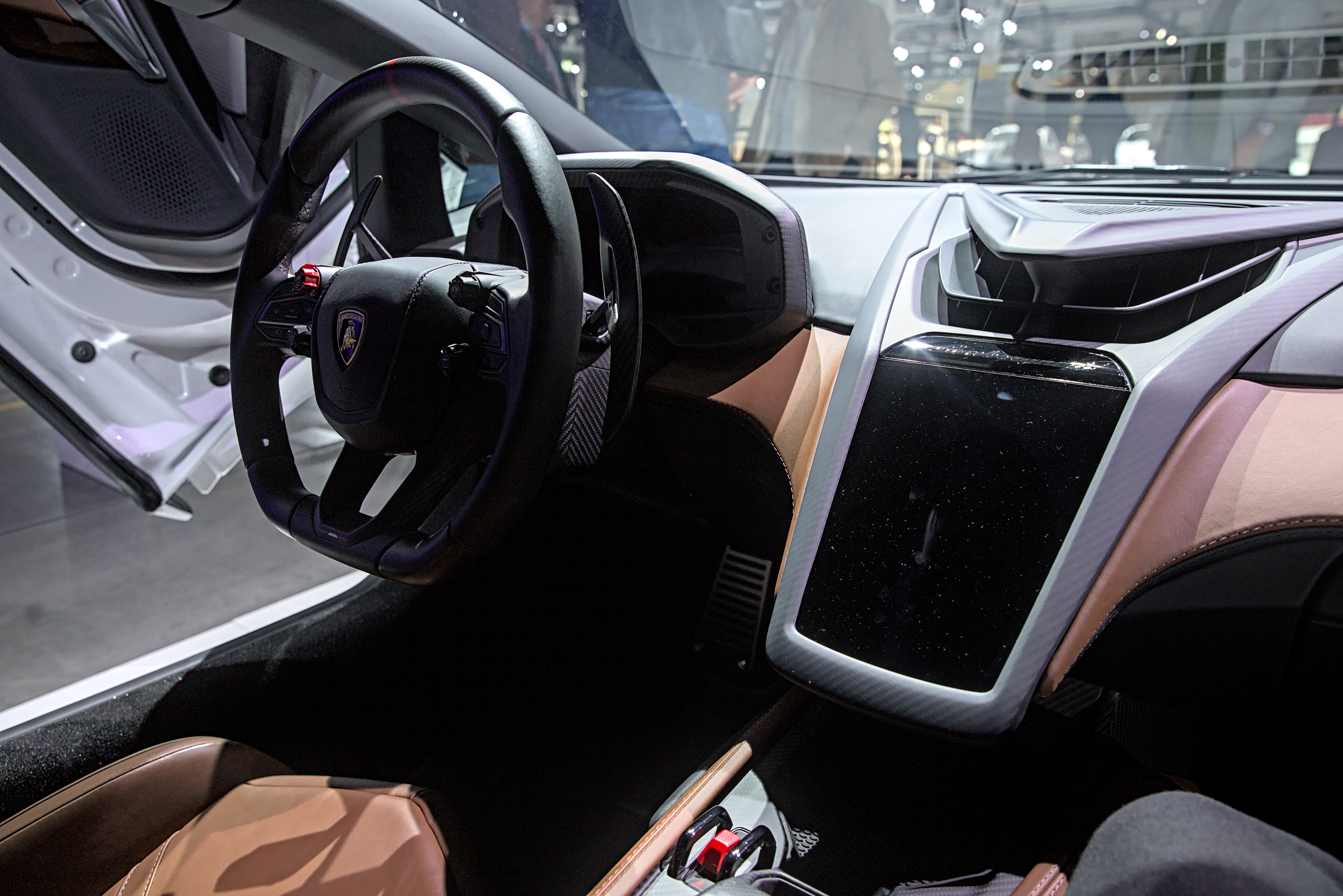
Rear view, interior

At the front, the Revuelto includes a set of brand new Y-shaped day-time running LED lights with the main headlights located at the top corners of the running lights. The car also features Lamborghini's ALA (Aerodinamica Lamborghini Attiva) system, which is said to be 80% lighter than regular sports car hydraulic systems having redesigned vents underneath the headlights and behind the scissor doors.

At the rear, the Revuelto features an active aero spoiler which produces more downforce than its predecessor. The tail-lights feature the same Y-shaped design as the headlights.

The Revuelto has its exhaust tips positioned between the taillights, with the rear spoiler being shaped around them. Another feature setting the Revuelto apart from its predecessors is the completely exposed engine bay, similar to the Bugatti Veyron and Chiron.

=== Interior ===
The Revuelto features increased interior space, improving comfort for its occupants. It also has a new hybrid driving mode called "Città," Italian for "city." This driving mode reduces the power-output of the car for daily usage and extra comfort while driving on urban roads. The car's redesigned instrument cluster shows the state of charge and energy recovery. It also displays the music being played by the infotainment system and fuel usage which separates on the left and right sides of the main display. The 8.4 inch vertical centre display supports Amazon Alexa, Apple CarPlay and Android Auto. The car features a small display located in front of the passenger that monitors the speed, selected gear and the car's state.

== Specifications ==
=== Body ===
The Revuelto has a monocoque composed entirely of carbon fibre, making it 10% lighter than the Aventador's chassis. Torsional rigidity has been improved by 25% and the front frame is 20% lighter. Lamborghini has used carbon fibre in the construction, and the back of the chassis contains high-strength aluminium alloys.

=== Powertrain ===
The Revuelto features a new 6.5-liter V12 engine, complemented by three electric motors that produce a combined power of 746.5 kW (1,015 PS).

Engine	V12
Electric motor	Front e-axle
Intake	Naturally aspirated
Displacement	6498.5 cm^{3}
Power	ICE: 825 PS (814 hp; 607 kW); Electric: 190 PS (187 hp; 140 kW); Combined: 1,015 PS (1,001 hp; 747 kW)
Torque	ICE: 725 N⋅m (535 lbf⋅ft); Electric: 82 N⋅m (60 lbf⋅ft); Combined: 807 N⋅m (595 lb⋅ft)
Transmission	8-speed dual-clutch transmission
Drivetrain	All-wheel drive
Top speed	350 km/h (217 mph)
0–100 km/h (0–62 mph)	2.5 seconds
0–200 km/h (0–124 mph)	6.6 seconds
0–300 km/h (0–186 mph)	15.3 seconds
Dry weight	1,772 kg (3,907 lb)
Brakes	Carbon-ceramic brake discs Front: 410×38 mm, 10 piston calipers Rear: 390×32 mm, 4 piston calipers
Battery
Type	Lithium-ion
Rated capacity	3.8 kWh
Range (WLTP)	10 km (6.2 mi)

== Models ==
=== Revuelto SV (2026) ===
On 14 August 2026, Lamborghini unveiled the new Revuelto SV, which claims to be the fastest and most powerful lamborghini model ever made.

== Variants ==
=== Opera Unica (2024) ===
Through their Ad Personam division, Lamborghini has built a handful of one-off "Opera Unica" models based on standard Revueltos, and featuring unique, hand-painted liveries and custom interior details.

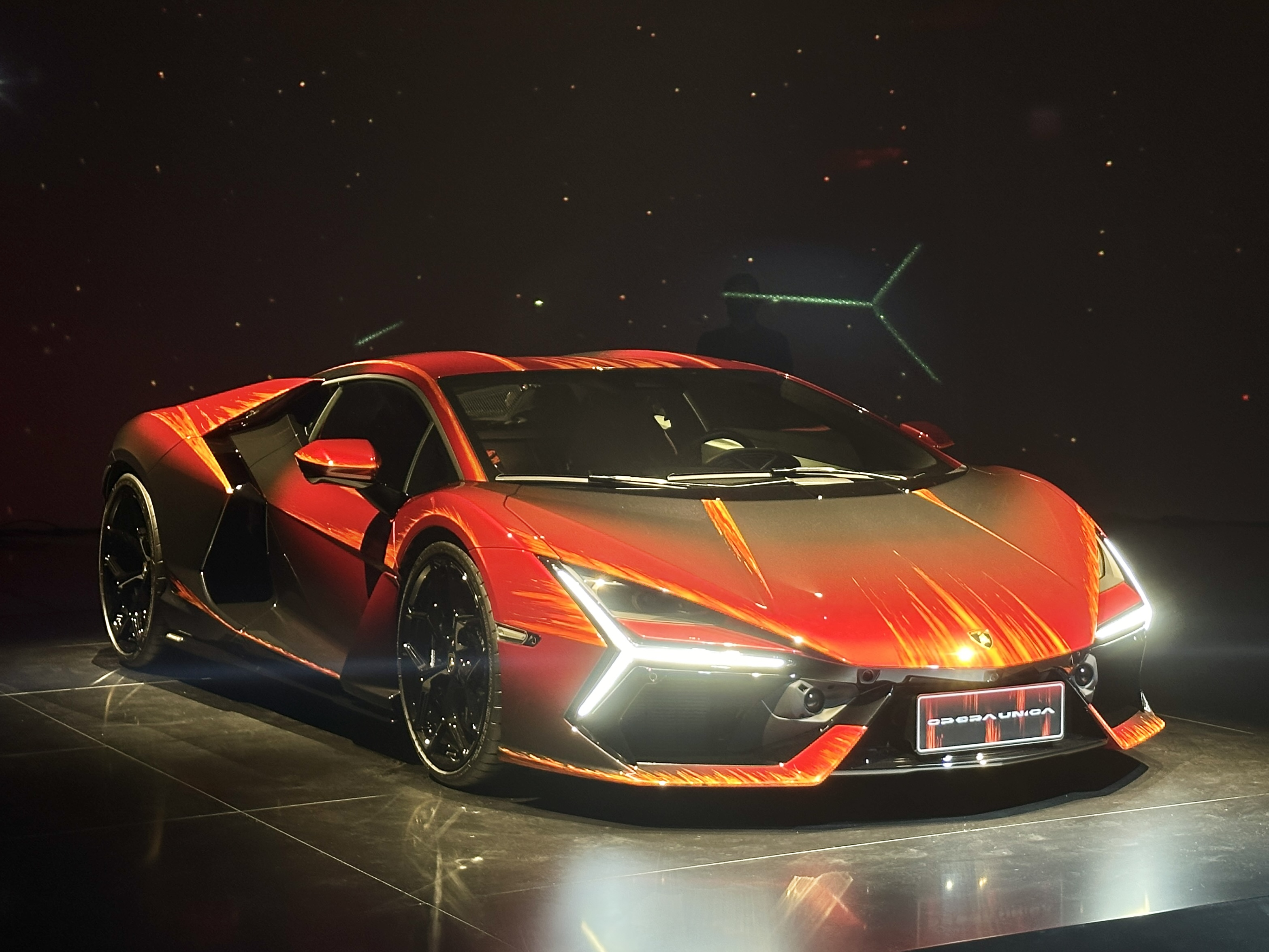
Revuelto Opera Unica, inspired by the brightest star in the Taurus constellation

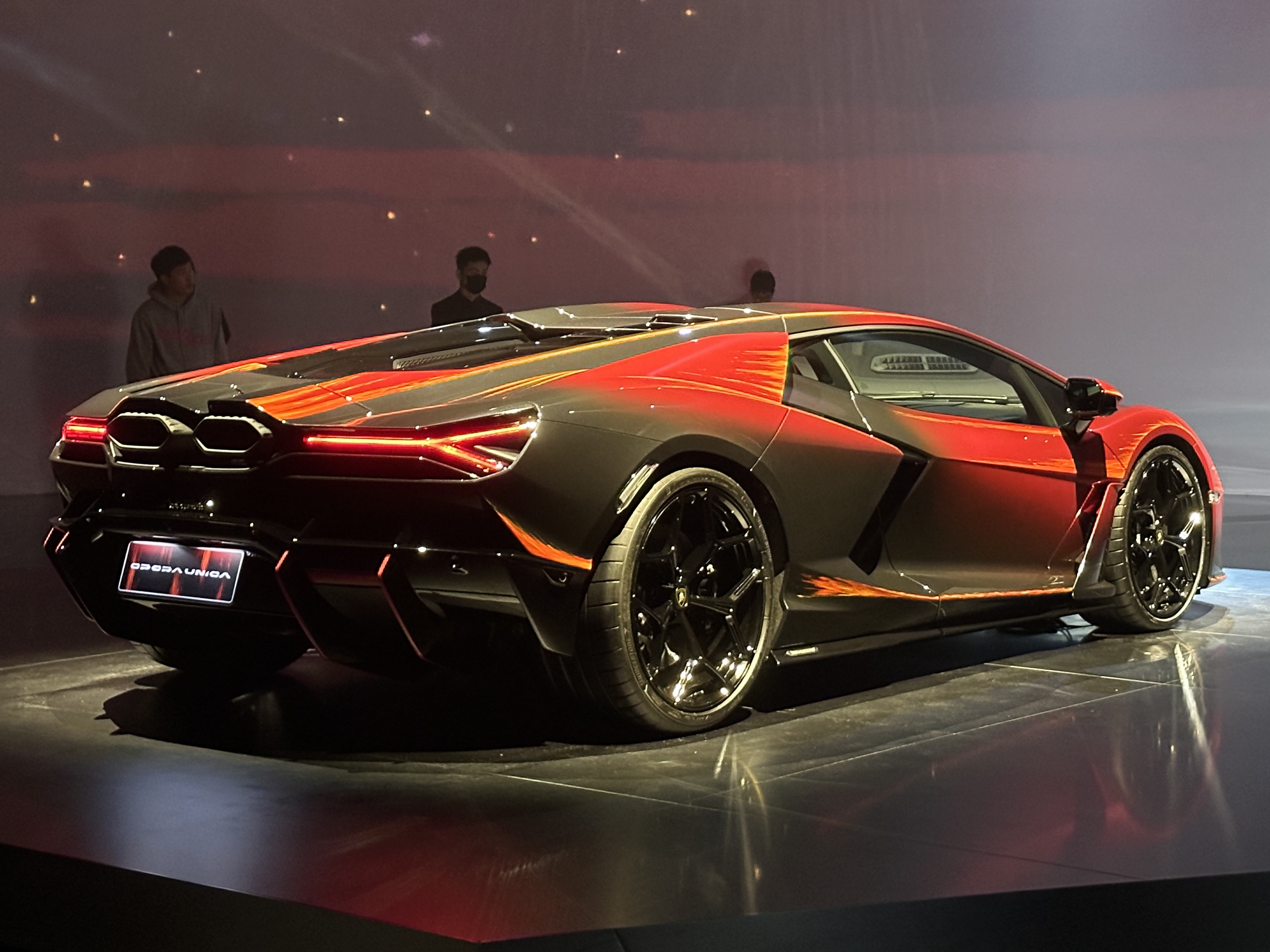
Rear view

=== Ducati Lamborghini (2025) ===
During Milan Design Week, Ducati and Lamborghini have established a collaboration by releasing a Ducati Panigale V4 Lamborghini and a Lamborghini Revuelto with the same two-tone livery in Grigio Telesto and Nero Noctis with details and logo of number 63 in Verde Scandal. This represents the third time in the partnership between Ducati and Lamborghini. This event was called The Art of Unexpected.

=== Italia (2026) ===
On 6 February 2026, to celebrate the 2026 Winter Olympics, Lamborghini Revuelto Italia unveiled with the Ad Personam program, featuring a white livery (Bianco Siderale), a central Italian tricolor stripe and blue brake calipers. While on 17 March 2026, to commemorate the 165th Anniversary of the Unification of Italy, Lamborghini Revuelto Italia released with a blue livery (Blu Nethuns), a central Italian tricolor stripe, blue interior and white brake calipers. Both versions are fitted with Rims Altanero Titanium matt Diamond cut (21"/22" forged).

=== Miura 60° (2026) ===
Lamborghini released this special version to celebrate the 60th anniversary of the Lamborghini Miura. Only 99 units are planned for production.

== Sales ==
Year	Production
2022	36
2023	204
2024	1,914
2025	2,079
