= Allar, Azerbaijan =

Allar, Azerbaijan may refer to:

- Allar, Jalilabad
- Allar, Yardymli
