= Lamborghini Fenomeno =

Limited production V12 hybrid sports car

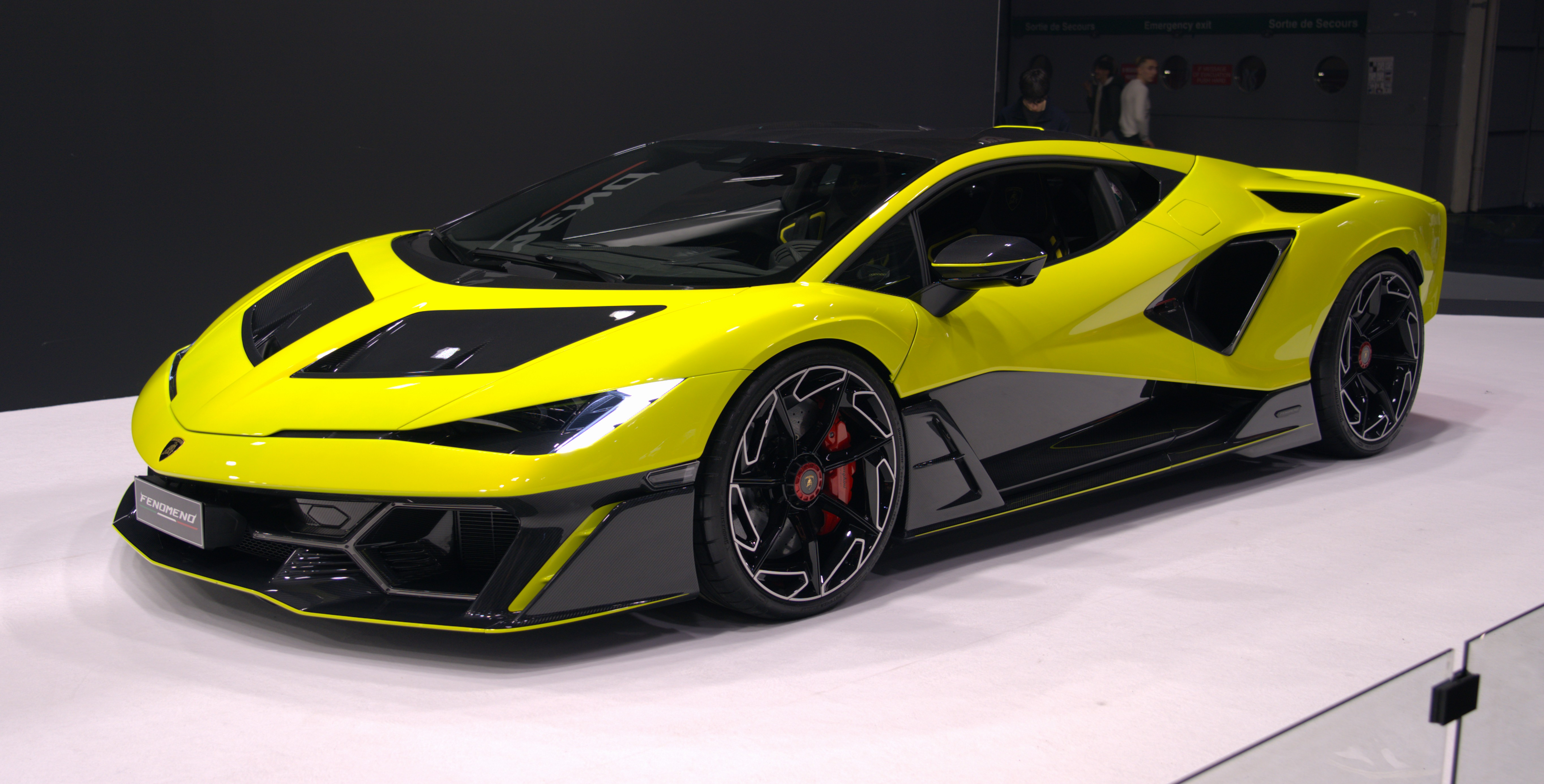

Overview
- Manufacturer: Lamborghini
- Production: 2025–present (44 units planned)
- Model years: 2026–present
- Assembly: Italy: Sant'Agata Bolognese
- Designer: Mitja Borkert

Body and chassis
- Class: Sports car (S)
- Body style: 2-door coupé; 2-door roadster (limited 15 units)
- Layout: Mid-engine, all-wheel-drive
- Doors: Scissor
- Related: Lamborghini Revuelto

Powertrain
- Engine: 6.5 L (6,498 cc) L545 naturally aspirated V12
- Electric motor: 3x permanent magnet motors
- Power output: V12 engine: 824 hp (835 PS) at 9,250 rpm 535 lb⋅ft (725 N⋅m) at 6,750 rpm; Electric motor (combined): 242 hp (245 PS) 627 lb⋅ft (850 N⋅m); Total output: 1,065 hp (1,080 PS) 1,162 lb⋅ft (1,575 N⋅m)
- Transmission: 8-speed Graziano dual-clutch automatic
- Hybrid drivetrain: PHEV
- Battery: 3.8 kWh lithium-ion high specific power battery with pouch cells

Dimensions
- Wheelbase: 2,779 mm (109.4 in)
- Length: 5,036 mm (198.3 in)
- Width: 2,266 mm (89.2 in) (incl. mirrors); 2,072 mm (81.6 in) (body)
- Height: 1,161 mm (45.7 in)
- Curb weight: 1,772 kg (3,907 lb) dry 1,880 kg (4,145 lb) kerb

The Lamborghini Fenomeno is a mid-engine plug-in hybrid sports car produced by the Italian automobile manufacturer Lamborghini. A total of 29 units were built, all of which were sold before the official presentation.

== History ==
Rear view

On August 16, 2025, Lamborghini Fenomeno was unveiled at 2025 Monterey Car Week to celebrate 20 years of Lamborghini Centro Stile. The name Fenomeno comes from Italian and means something exceptional, phenomenal and extraordinary.

== Specifications and performance ==
=== Specifications ===
Bore and stroke	95 x 76.4 mm
Compression ratio	12.6 : 1
Max power (international combustion)	614 kW (824 hp; 835 CV) at 9,250 rpm
Max power (hybrid)	795 kW (1,066 hp; 1,081 CV)
Max torque	725 N⋅m (535 lbf⋅ft) at 6,750 rpm
Cooling system	Liquid-cooled
Electric motors	Dual flux permanent magnet motors (front and rear)
Lubrication system	Dry sump
Front track	1,730 mm (68 in)
Rear track	1,711 mm (67 in)
Weight-to-power ratio	1.66 kg/CV
Weight distribution (front-rear)	43% front, 57% rear

== Models ==
=== Lamborghini Fenomeno Roadster (2026) ===
On May 10, 2026, Lamborghini unveiled the Fenomeno Roadster, also produced in a limited series of 15 units. The car was sold by Lamborghini for around 5 million euros and the entire series has already been sold.
