= Lamborghini Sián FKP 37 =

Limited production V12 hybrid sports car

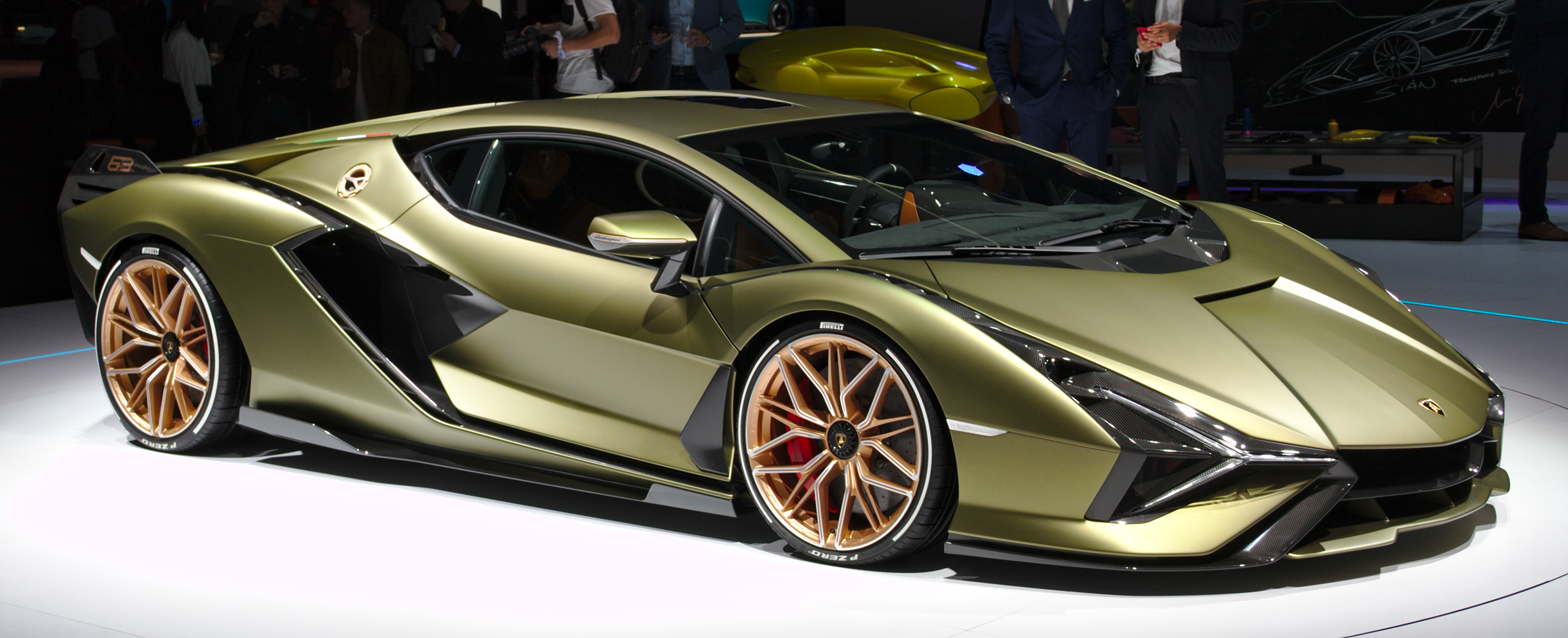

Overview
- Manufacturer: Lamborghini
- Production: 2020–2022
- Assembly: Italy: Sant'Agata Bolognese
- Designer: Mitja Borkert

Body and chassis
- Class: Sports car (S)
- Body style: 2-door coupé; 2-door roadster
- Layout: Mid-engine, all-wheel drive
- Doors: Scissor
- Related: Lamborghini Countach LPI 800-4; Lamborghini Aventador

Powertrain
- Engine: 6.5 L L539 V12
- Electric motor: 48-volt e-motor to the gearbox
- Power output: Engine: 785 PS (577 kW; 774 hp); Electric motor: 34 PS (25 kW; 34 hp); Combined: 819 PS (602 kW; 808 hp)
- Transmission: 7-speed ISR automated manual
- Hybrid drivetrain: Full hybrid

Dimensions
- Wheelbase: 2,700 mm (106.3 in)
- Length: 4,980 mm (196.1 in)
- Width: 2,101 mm (82.7 in) (without mirrors); 2,265 mm (89.2 in) (with mirrors)
- Height: 1,133 mm (44.6 in)

The Lamborghini Sián FKP 37 is a limited production mid-engine hybrid sports car produced by the Italian automotive manufacturer Lamborghini. Unveiled online on 3 September 2019, the Sián is the first hybrid production vehicle produced by the company.

== Nomenclature ==
The name Sián comes from the Bolognese dialect of Emilian language siån, which means a flash of lightning (shine). The name was selected to highlight the fact that the car is the first production vehicle produced by the company to include a hybrid supercapacitor component. The suffix FKP 37 is related to the initials and birth year of the late Volkswagen Group chairman Ferdinand Karl Piëch.

== Specifications and performance ==
Based on the Lamborghini Aventador, the Sián FKP 37 shares its engine with the SVJ variant of the Aventador, but an electric motor integrated into the gearbox adds another 25 kW (34 PS; 34 hp) to the power output. Other modifications to the engine include the addition of titanium intake valves, a reconfigured ECU and a new exhaust system raising the power output to 576 kW (784 PS; 773 hp). The total power output is 602 kW (818 PS; 807 hp), which made the Sián the most powerful production Lamborghini when it was launched. The engine is connected to a 7-speed automated manual transmission and the car employs an electronically controlled all-wheel-drive system with a rear mechanical self-locking differential for improved handling.

The power for the electric motor is stored in a supercapacitor unit instead of conventional lithium-ion batteries. The supercapacitor unit is integrated with the electric motor into the gearbox for a better weight distribution. A supercapacitor was chosen as it provides three times the power of a conventional lithium-ion battery of the same weight. The unit installed in the car is an evolution of the Aventador's starter motor and can store ten times more power than the unit it is based on. A regenerative braking system helps generate enough energy to recharge the supercapacitors. The electric motor counters the effect of deceleration and provides a power boost to the driver at speeds up to 130 km/h (81 mph). The motor supports low-speed manoeuvres such as parking and reversing.

The improvements made to the car help accelerate it from 0 to 100 km/h (62 mph) in 2.8 seconds and a top speed of 355 km/h as stated.

== Design ==
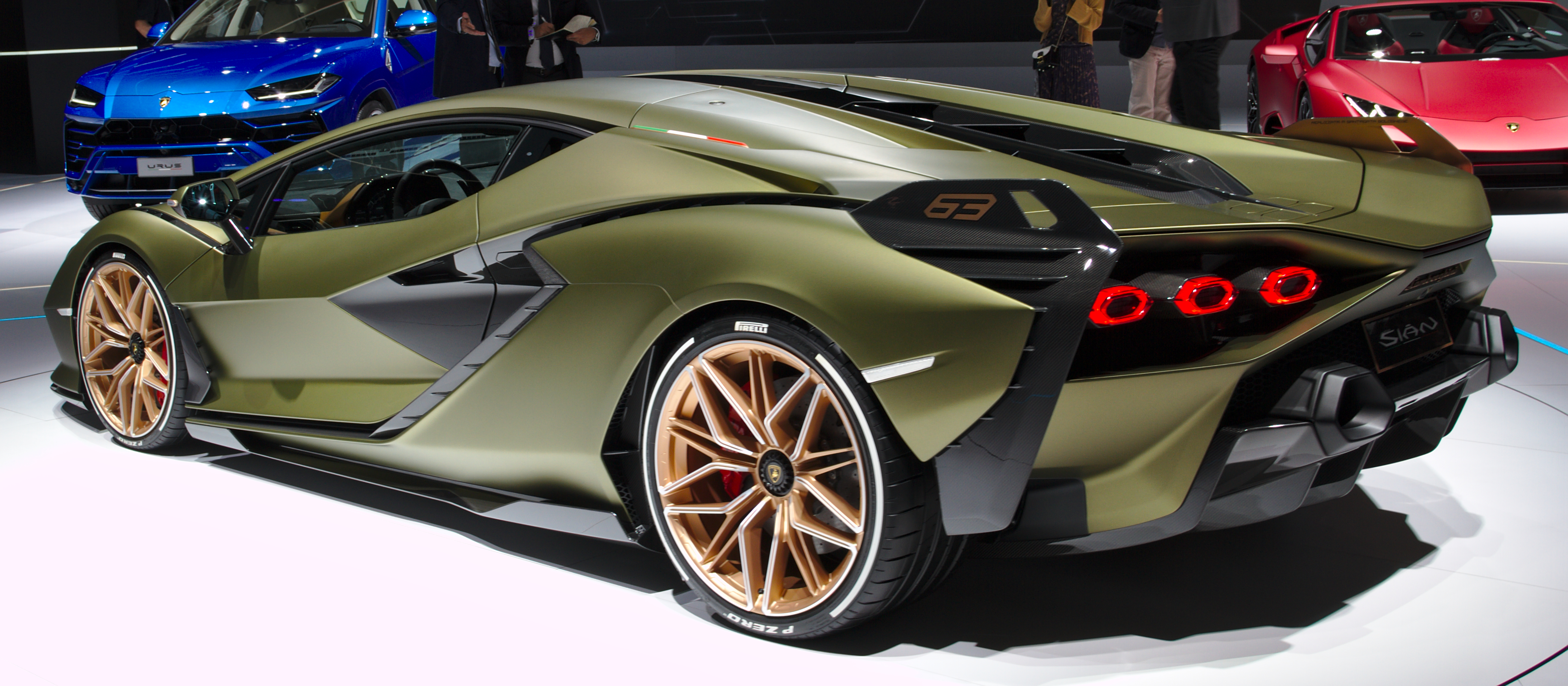
Rear view

The exterior design incorporates a wedge shape, a trademark of famed automobile designer Marcello Gandini and mixes that with the design of the Terzo Millennio concept introduced two years prior. The Y-shaped daytime running headlights are inspired by the Terzo Millennio while at the rear an active fixed rear wing with the number "63" embossed on its winglets to honour the company's year of incorporation creates downforce. Downforce is maximised by the model's prominent side air intakes and large carbon-fibre front splitter. A transparent "Peroscopio" glass panel runs from the centre of the roof and rolls back into the slatted engine cover adds light and visibility for the occupants, and the six hexagonal taillights are an inspiration from the Countach.

Along with the wing, active cooling vanes at the rear are used which are activated by a smart material that reacts to heat. When a certain temperature is reached, the vanes rotate for extra airflow. The interior is based heavily on the Aventador's interior, but the centre console has been tidied up and a portrait touchscreen first seen in the Huracán Evo is one of the key differences. The leather upholstery is from Poltrona Frau, an Italian furniture company and 3D printed parts are used on the interior for the first time.

== Production ==
Production of the Sián FKP 37 was limited to 63 units for the coupe and 19 for the roadster and all have already been sold. Lamborghini's Ad Personam division will be responsible for the manufacture of the Sián. The car was officially unveiled to the public at the 2019 Frankfurt Motor Show configured in a unique "electric gold" paint. It was also renamed to be known as the Sián FKP 37 honouring late Volkswagen Group chairman Ferdinand Piëch. "FKP" are the initials of his name and "37" are the last two numbers of his birth year (i.e. 1937).

== Sián Roadster ==
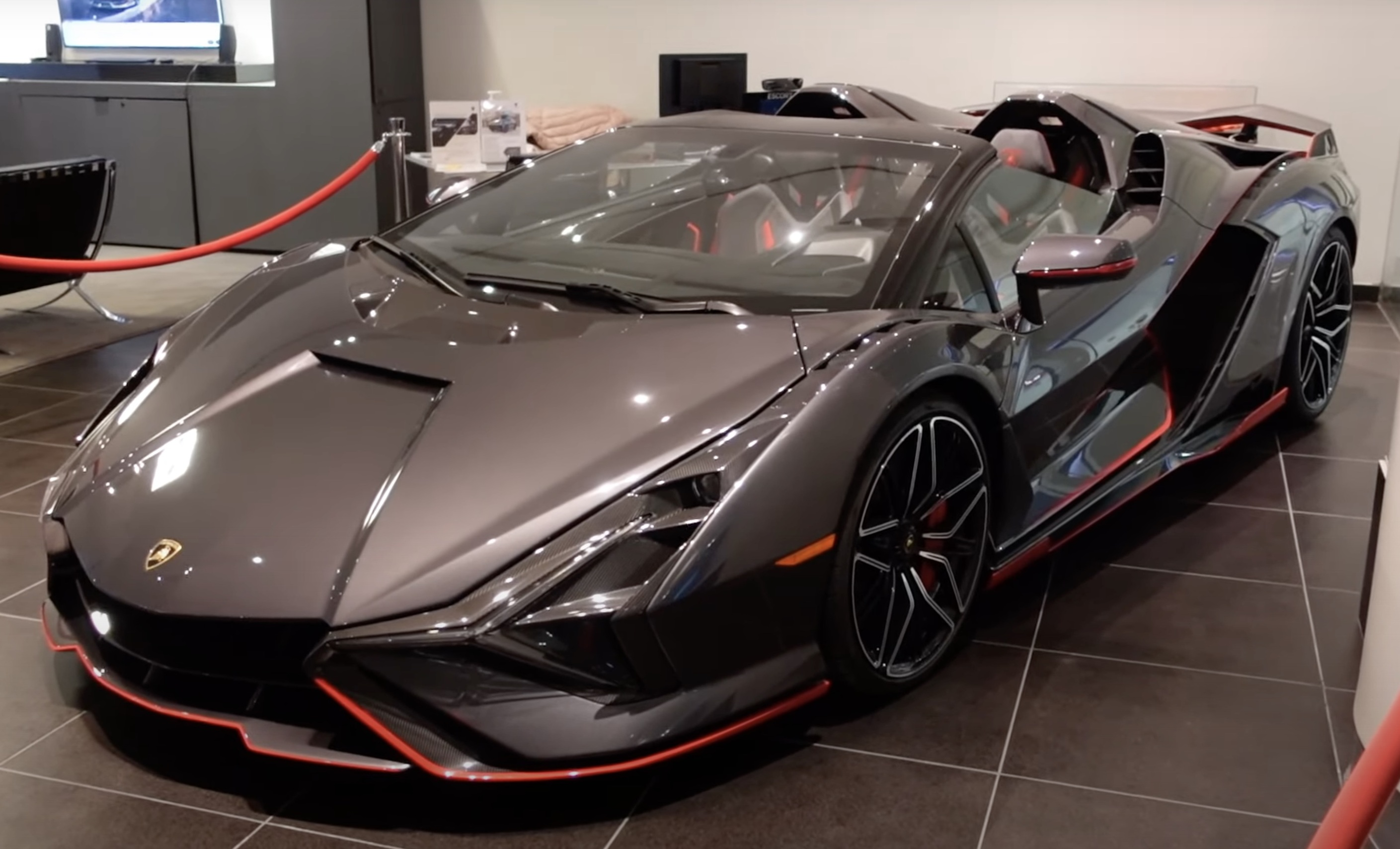
Sián Roadster

In July 2020, Lamborghini unveiled the convertible roadster version of the Sián FKP 37 simply called the Sián Roadster. The car was launched in a new colour called Blu Uranus and is limited to 19 units, all of which have been already sold. Mechanically, the Roadster is similar to the coupe, retaining the same engine and the supercapacitor hybrid system. At the rear, the car features 3D printed carbon fibre air vents on which the buyers can add their initials, making each car unique.

== Replica ==
A replica of the Sián, made from construction bricks, was presented by Lego at the 2022 Paris Motor Show, although Lamborghini was not present at the event.

== See also ==
- List of production cars by power output
