= Lamborghini Countach LPI 800-4 =

Limited production V12 hybrid sports car

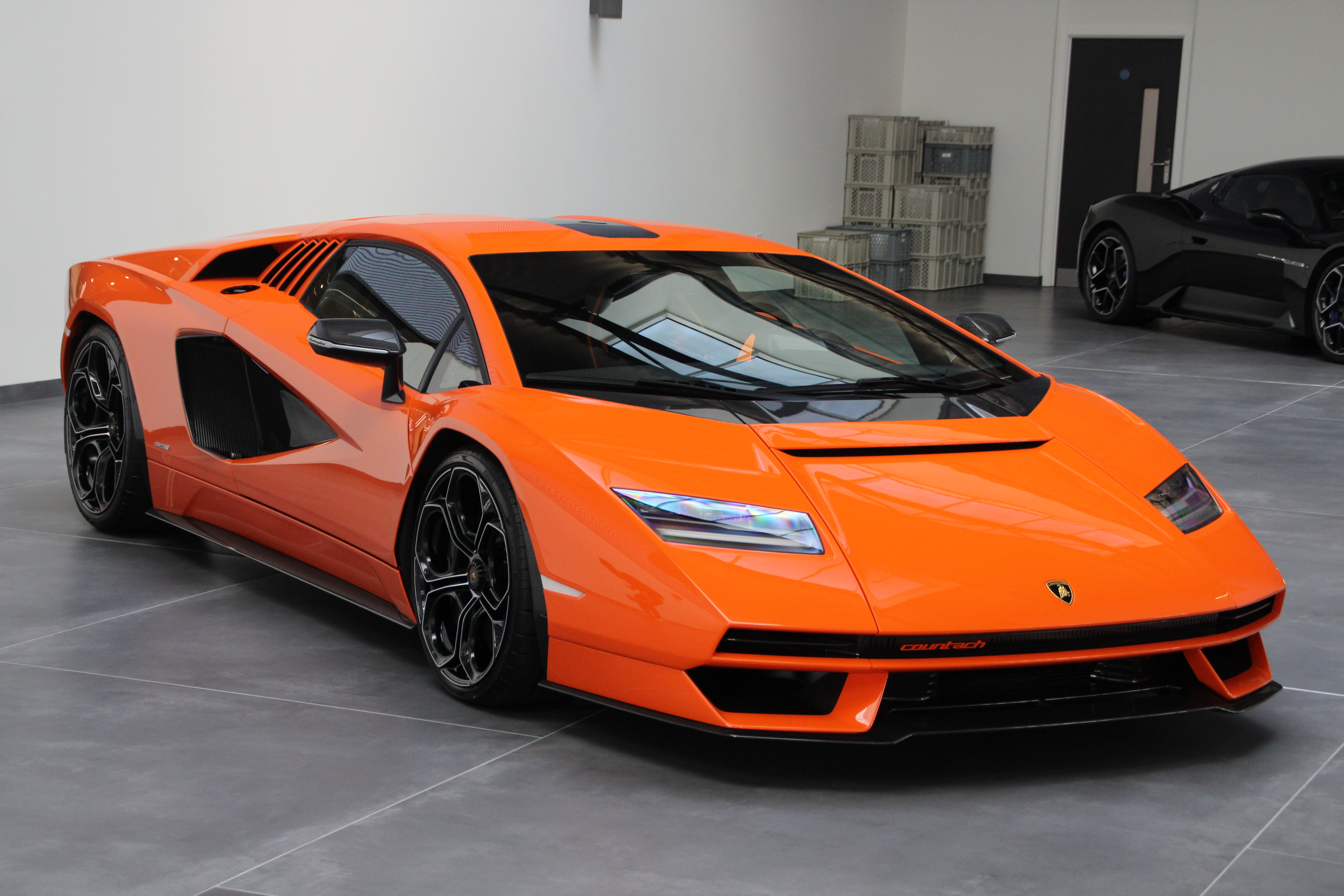
- Lamborghini Countach LPI 800-4

Overview
- Manufacturer: Lamborghini
- Production: 2022 (112 units)
- Assembly: Italy: Sant'Agata Bolognese
- Designer: Mitja Borkert

Body and chassis
- Class: Sports car (S)
- Body style: 2-door coupe
- Layout: Rear mid-engine, four-wheel drive
- Doors: Scissor
- Related: Lamborghini Sián FKP 37; Lamborghini Aventador

Powertrain
- Engine: 6.5 L (397 cu in) L539 V12
- Electric motor: 48-volt
- Power output: Engine: 574 kW (780 PS; 770 hp); Electric motor: 25 kW (34 PS; 34 hp); Combined: 599 kW (814 PS; 803 hp)
- Transmission: 7-speed single clutch ISR automated manual
- Hybrid drivetrain: Mild hybrid

Dimensions
- Wheelbase: 2,700 mm (106.3 in)
- Length: 4,870 mm (191.7 in)
- Width: 2,099 mm (82.6 in)
- Height: 1,139 mm (44.8 in)
- Curb weight: 1,595 kg (3,516 lb) (dry)

The Lamborghini Countach LPI 800-4 is a limited-production mid-engine hybrid-electric sports car produced by the Italian automotive manufacturer Lamborghini and designed by its head of design Mitja Borkert. Unveiled on 14 August 2021, the car is inspired by and named after the original Countach, which was first introduced 50 years prior. Based on the hybridized powertrain of the Sián FKP 37, 112 units were produced, the number referring to the LP 112 model designation used during development of the original Countach.

All 112 units had been sold less than a week after the model was unveiled. Customer deliveries commenced in early 2022.

== Specifications and performance ==
The Countach LPI 800-4 shares its underpinnings and mechanicals with the Sián FKP 37 which was unveiled in 2019. It utilizes the same carbon-fiber monocoque along with the same mild hybrid powertrain with a slightly decreased combined output of 599 kW (814 PS; 803 hp) powering all four wheels. It is a combination of the longitudinally positioned (LP) naturally-aspirated 6.5-liter V12 engine which in this case produces 574 kW (780 PS; 770 hp), along with a 48-volt electric motor producing an additional 25 kW (34 PS; 34 hp) which is located inside the 7-speed automated manual transmission. Energy from the regenerative braking system is stored in a supercapacitor which is lighter than a traditional lithium-ion battery. The dry weight is 1,595 kg (3,516 lb), with the percentage split 43-57 front-to-rear.

Lamborghini claimed the car is capable of 0–100 km/h (0–62 mph) acceleration in 2.8 seconds, 0–200 km/h (0–124 mph) in 8.6 seconds and a top speed of 355 km/h (221 mph).

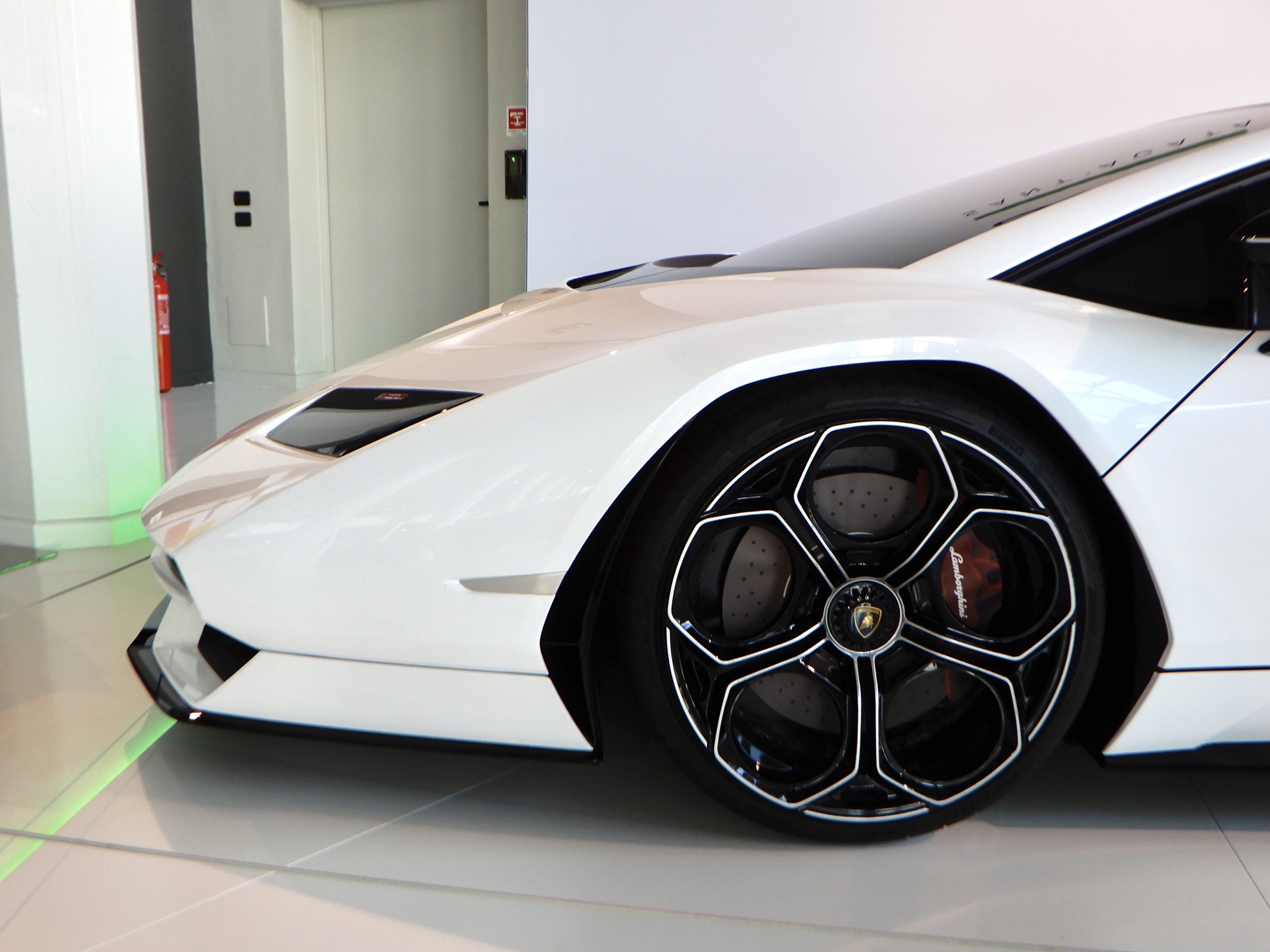
Front left wheel with carbon-ceramic brakes

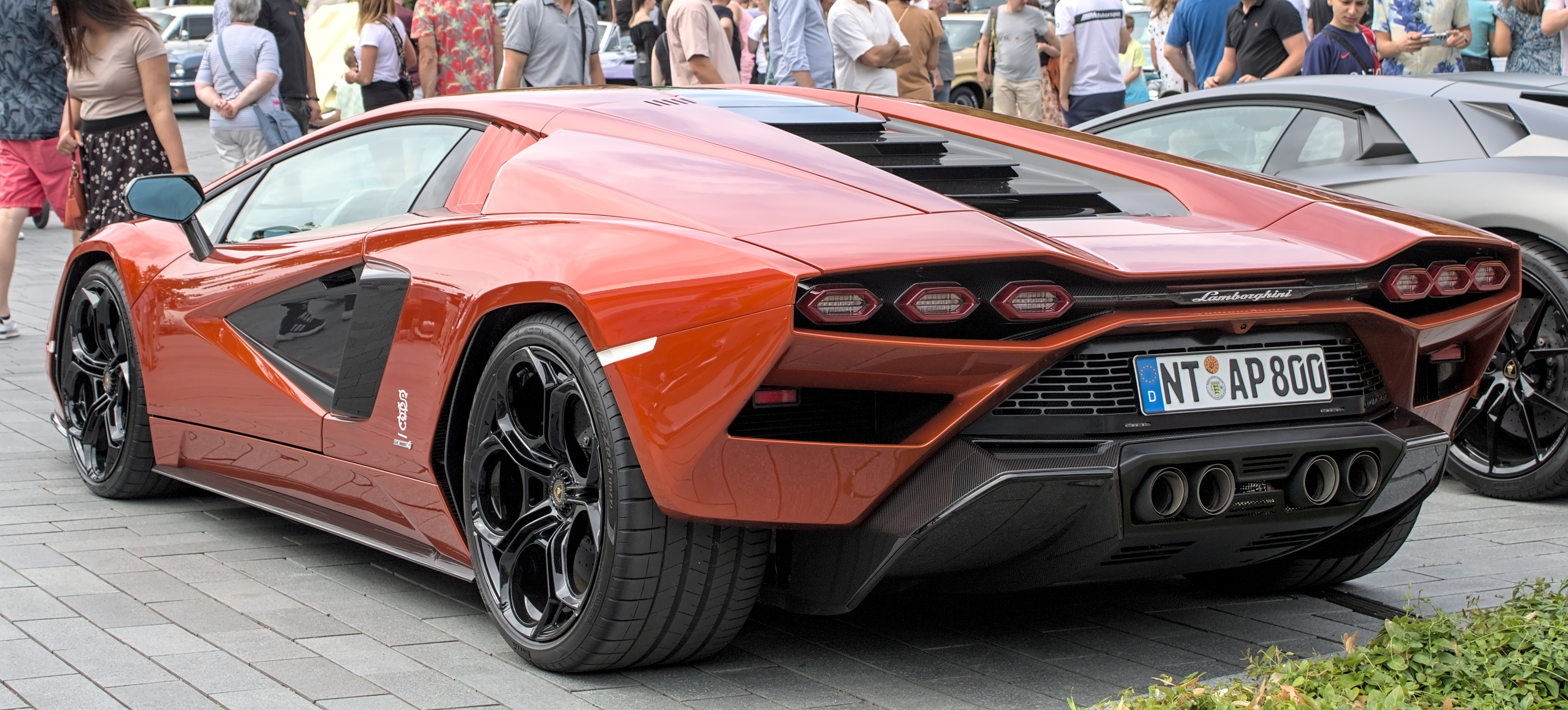
Rear view
