= Lamborghini Alar =

Overview
- Manufacturer: Lamborghini LatinoAmerica
- Assembly: Argentina
- Designer: Ariel Casariego

Body and chassis
- Class: Sports car
- Body style: 2-door coupé
- Layout: Mid-engine, four-wheel drive
- Doors: Scissor
- Related: Lamborghini Diablo

Powertrain
- Engine: 7.7 L V12
- Transmission: 5-speed manual

Dimensions
- Curb weight: 1,200 kg (2,646 lb)

The Lamborghini Alar was a concept for a mid-engined sports car to be produced by Lamborghini LatinoAmerica. A unit was rumored to cost $750,000 each. The Alar was heavily based on the Diablo especially in the areas of chassis and engine. Other components are made locally by the company. The Alar has yet to be produced.

== Performance ==
The engine of the Alar is a heavily modified Lamborghini Diablo engine, it is a 7.7 L V12 able to produce 770 bhp (574 kW) and can redline at about 7500 rpm. Its body weighs relatively the same as a Diablo at 1,134 kg (2,500 lb). Initial Reports suggest the Alar could top 248 mph (399 km/h) and could reach 0-60 mph (97 km/h) in 4 seconds, subsequent official brochures have outlined its specifications. The estimated top speed of the Alar is 255.2 mph (410.7 km/h) although these figures are highly debatable.

== Styling ==
Although it shares the same platform and engine as the Lamborghini Diablo its outer styling is completely different. Its styling is reminiscent of the Lamborghini Coatl, which is another car produced by Lamborghini Latinoamérica and designed by Joan Ferci. Like the Alar the Coatl is also based on the earlier Diablo.
