= Alar Streimann =

Estonian diplomat

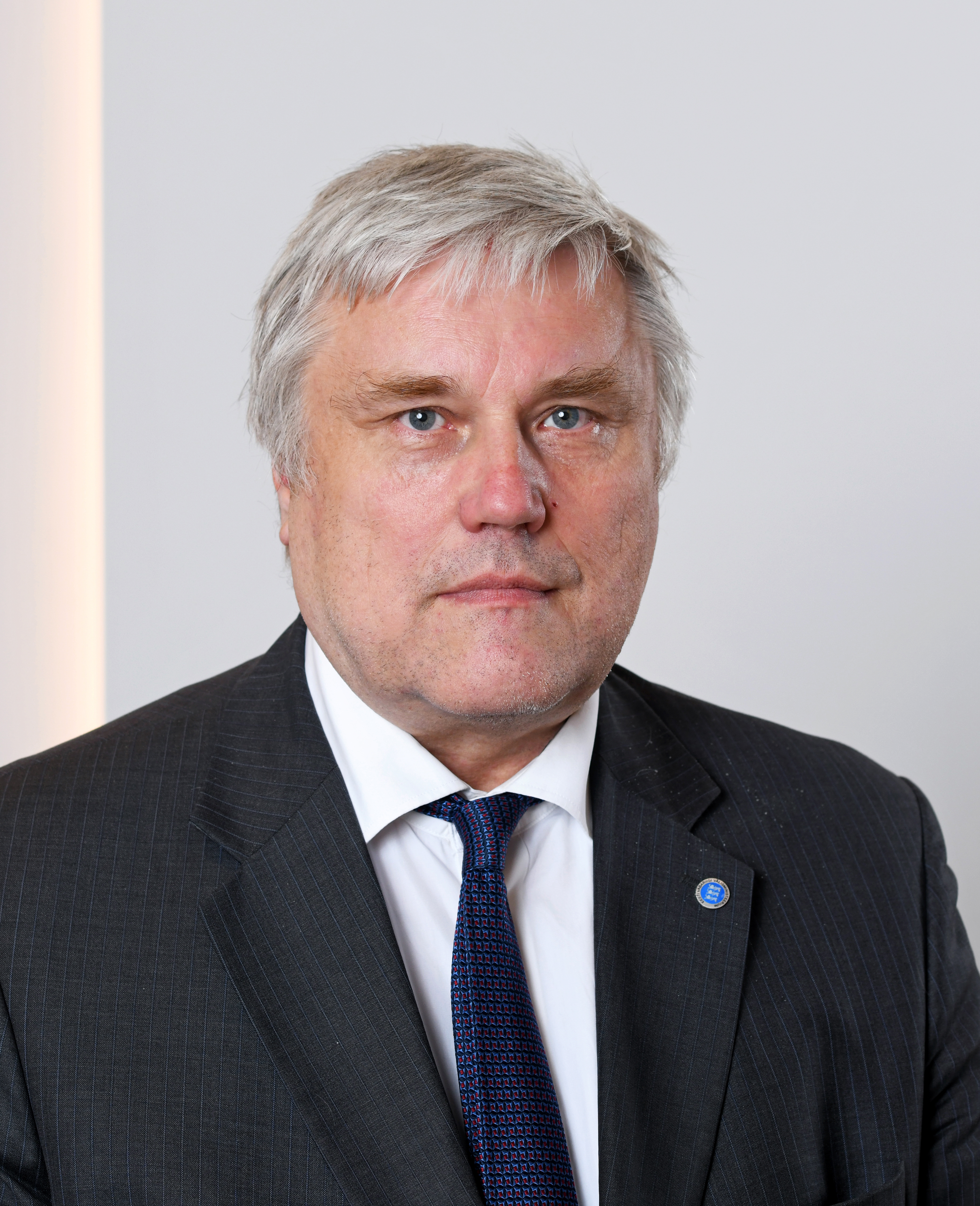
Alar Streimann (2022)

Alar Streimann (born in 1964 in Rakvere) is an Estonian diplomat.

In 1989 he graduated from Tartu University in English language and literature.

Since 1991 he is working at Ministry of Foreign Affairs. From 2011 to 2015 he served as the Estonian MFA's Chancellor, the Ministry's most senior civil servant position.

Diplomatic posts

- 2015-2019 Ambassador of Estonia in France
- since 2019 Ambassador of Estonia in Germany

In 2001 he was awarded with Order of the White Star, III class.
