= Alar Nääme =

Estonian politician

Alar Nääme (born 21 December 1983 in Valga) is an Estonian politician. He was the Deputy Mayor of Valga and the District Mayor of Kesklinn, Tallinn and was a member of the XIII Riigikogu, representing the Estonian Centre Party.

On 23 June 2016, Harju County court found Nääme guilty of embezzlement. He was ordered to pay a pecuniary punishment of €6,300.
