= Alar, Jalilabad =

Alar
- Municipality
- Location within Azerbaijan
- Coordinates: 39°18′55″N 48°31′59″E
- Country: Azerbaijan
- Rayon: Jalilabad

Population
  - Total: 6,702
- Time zone: UTC+4 (AZT)

Alar (also, Allar and Allary) is a village and municipality in the Jalilabad Rayon of Azerbaijan. It has a population of 9,702.
