= Allar, Yardymli =

Alar
- Municipality
- Location within Azerbaijan
- Coordinates: 38°47′53″N 48°14′12″E
- Country: Azerbaijan
- Rayon: Yardymli

Population
  - Total: 1,674
- Time zone: UTC+4 (AZT)

Allar (also, Alar) is a village and municipality in the Yardymli Rayon of Azerbaijan. It is on the shore of the Alar River (Vilesh). It has a population of 1,674.
