= Scissor doors =

Type of car door

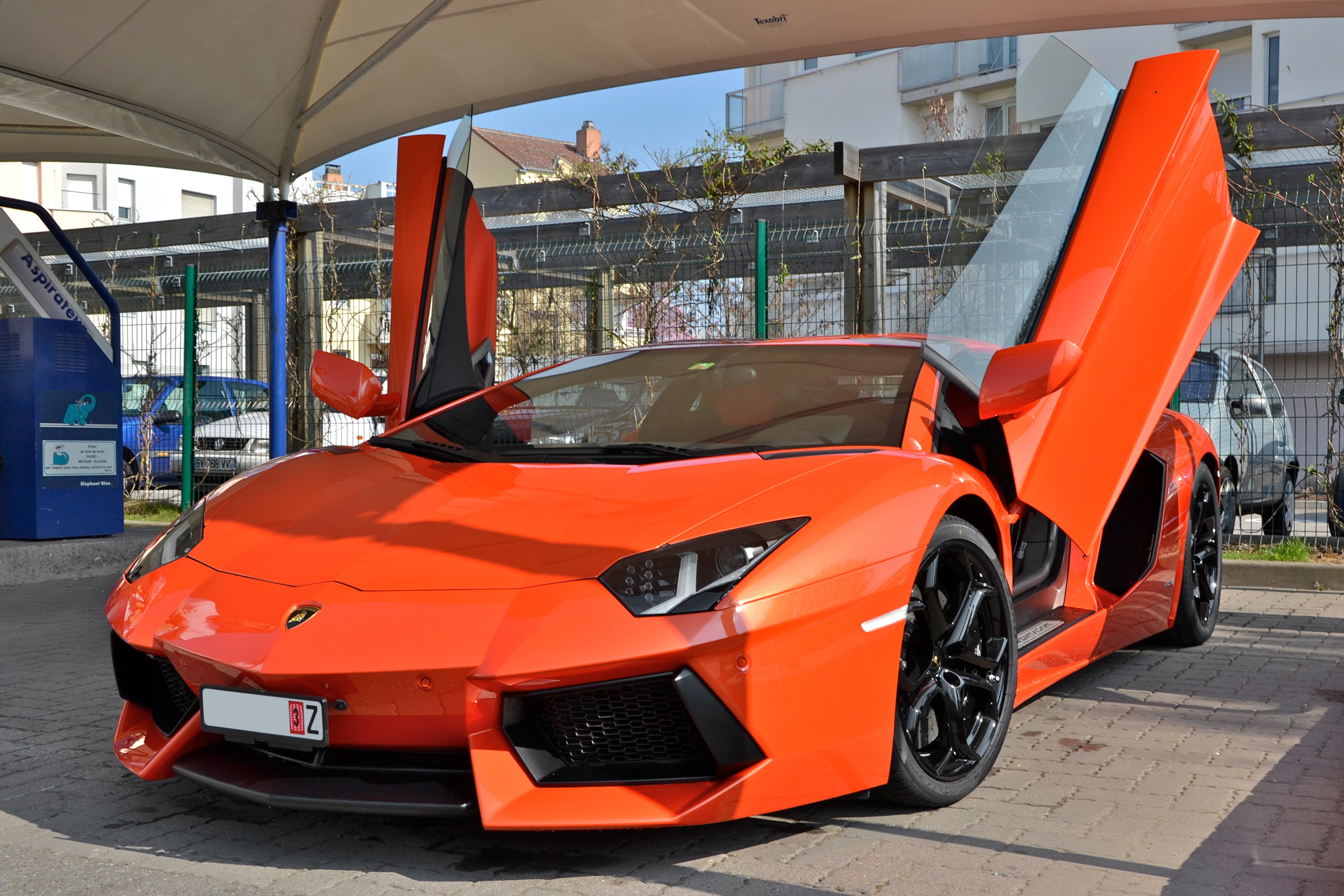
The Lamborghini Aventador

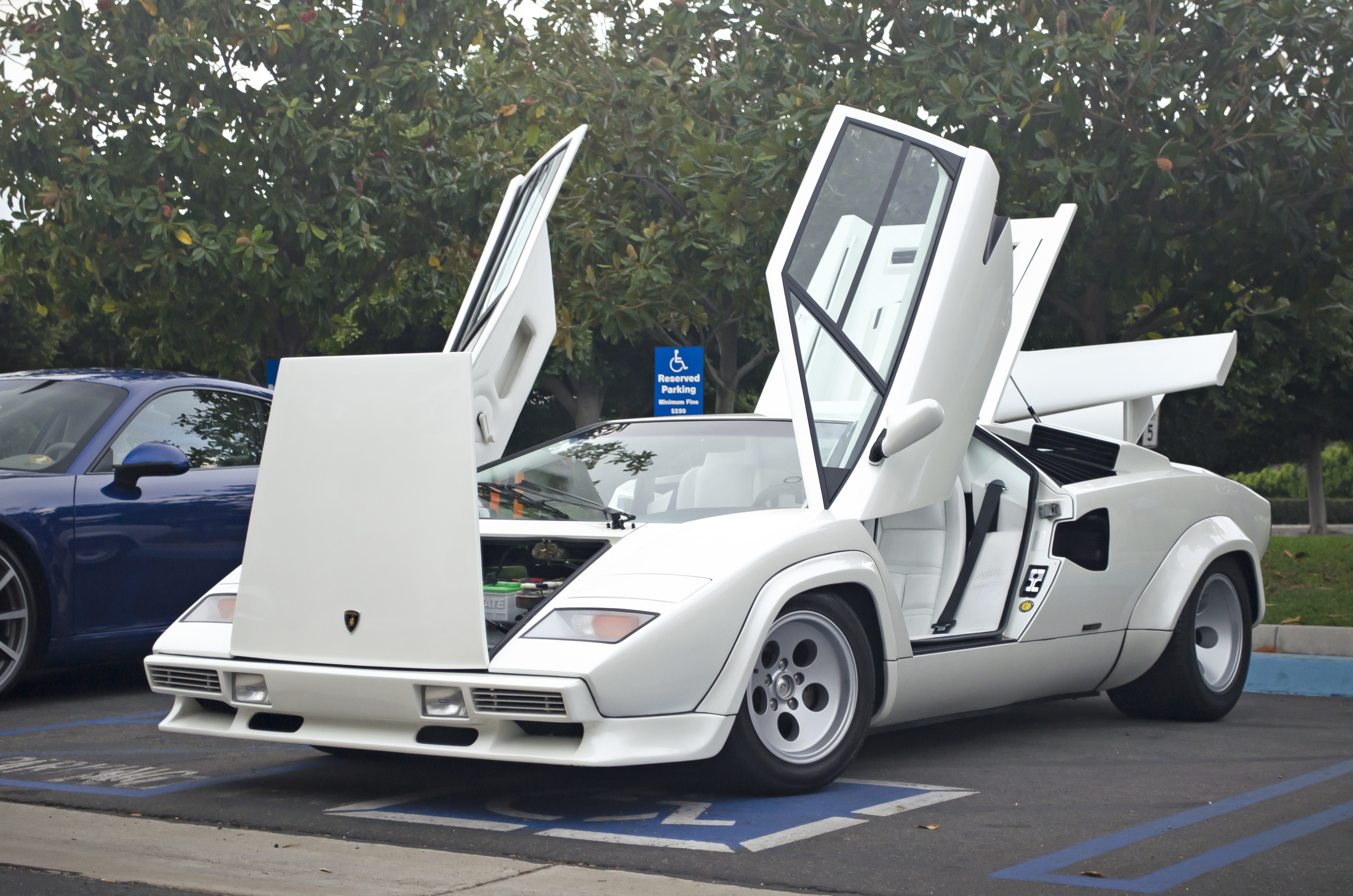
The Lamborghini Countach

Scissor doors (also called swing-up doors, Lamborghini doors, and Lambo doors) are automobile doors that rotate vertically at a fixed hinge at the front of the door, rather than outward as with a conventional door.

== History ==
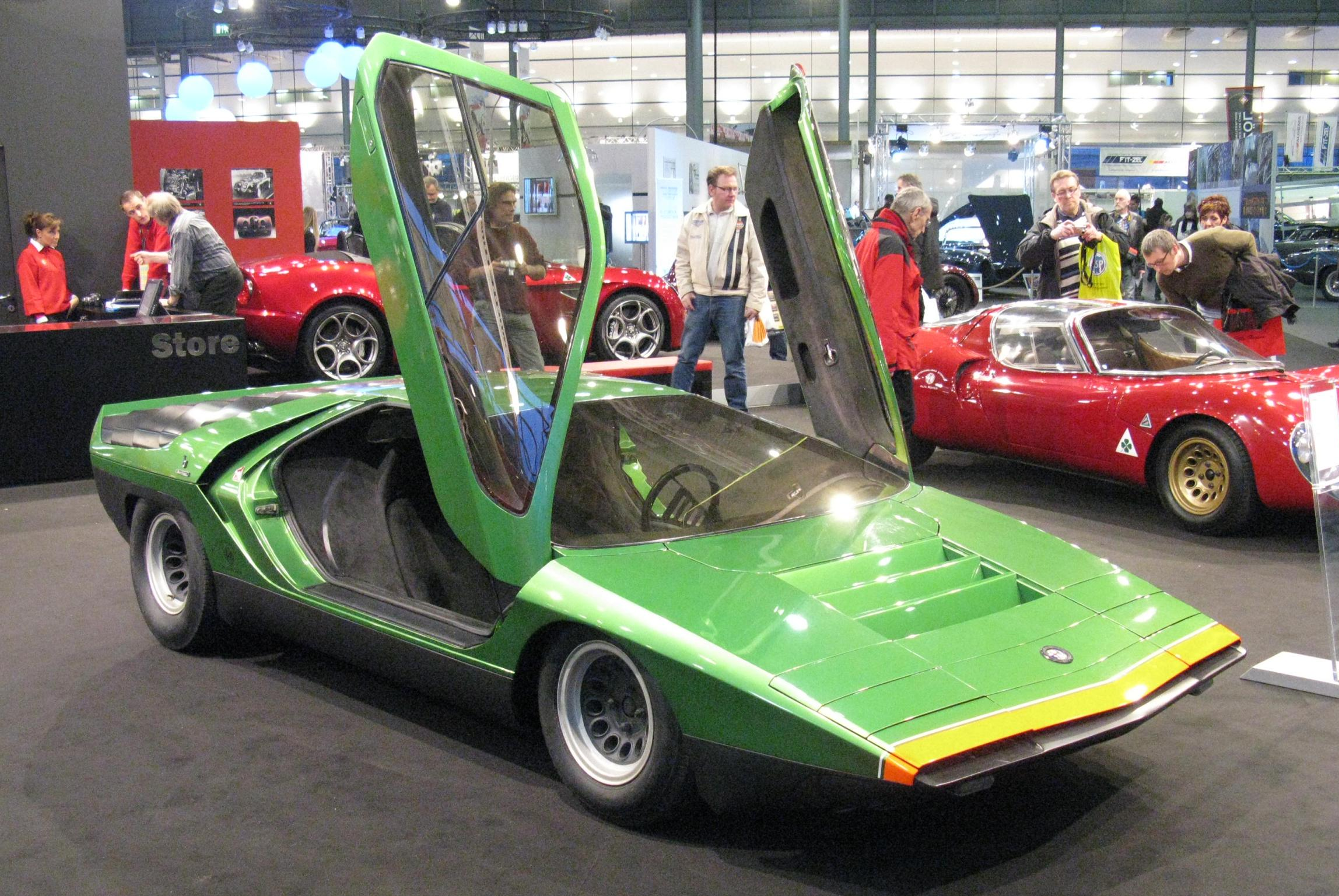
The Alfa Romeo Carabo concept car was the first vehicle to use scissor doors.

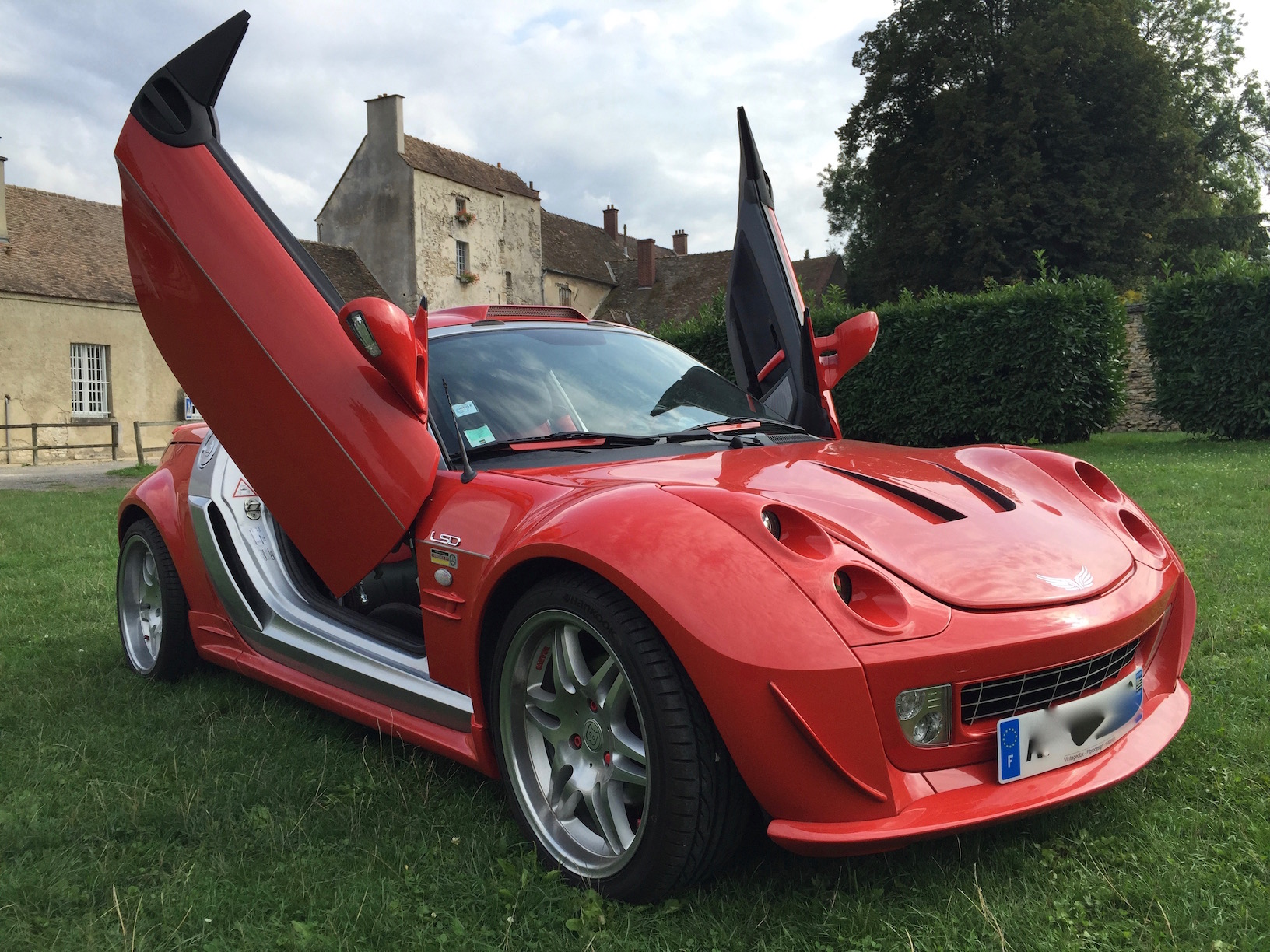
2006 Smart Roadster with prepared panel and scissor doors

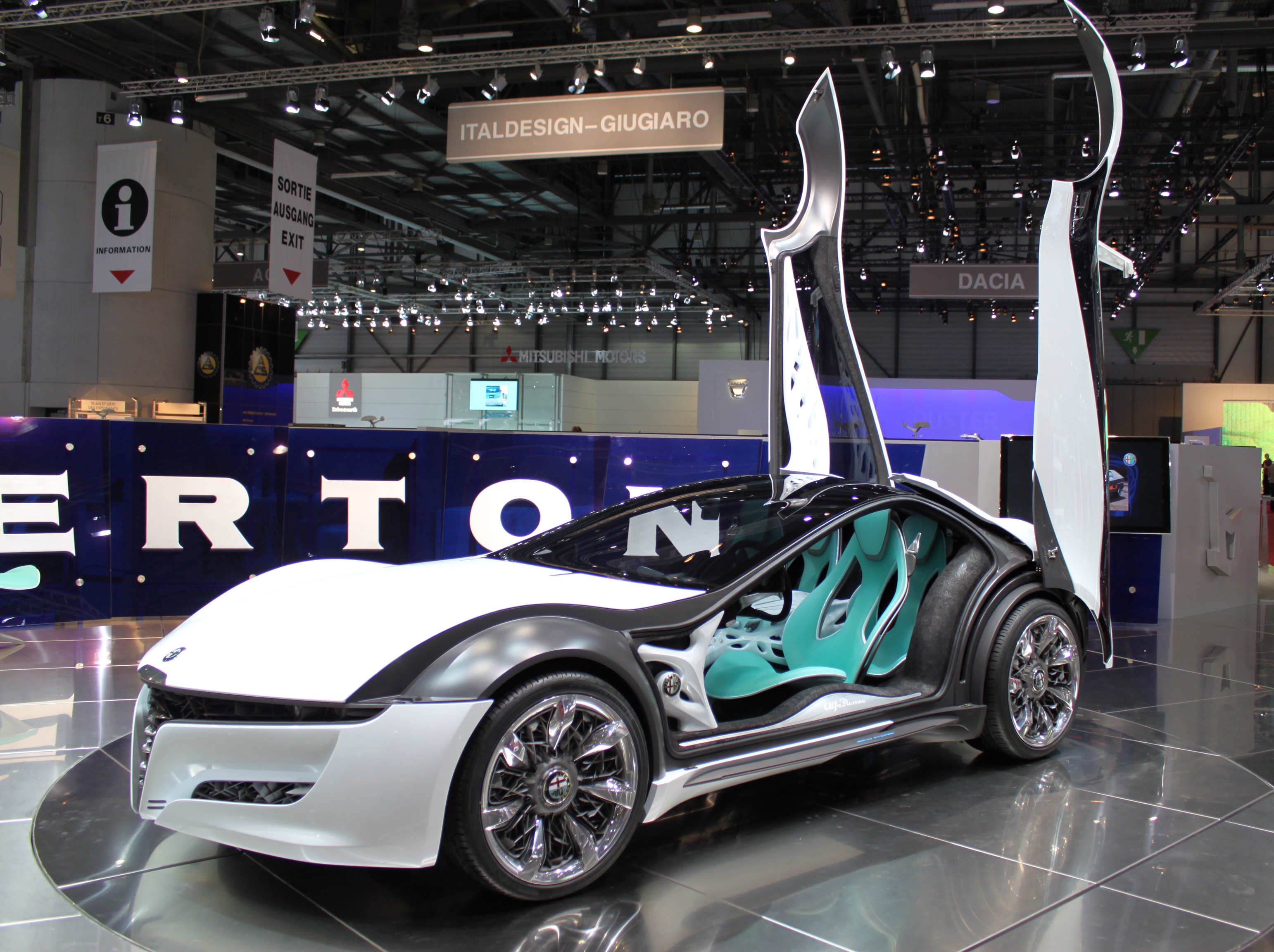
The Alfa Romeo Pandion concept car with rear-hinged scissor doors

The first vehicle to feature scissor doors was the 1968 Alfa Romeo Carabo concept car, designed by Marcello Gandini at Bertone. The door style was dictated by Gandini's desire for an innovative design, and by his concern over the car's extremely poor rear visibility. In order to reverse the car, the driver would be able to lift the door and lean their upper body out of the hatch in order to see behind the car. The first production car to feature the doors was a Lamborghini, the Gandini designed Countach; the sports car's wide chassis created similar problems to those found on the Carabo, calling for the unusual door configuration. This sports car was quite impractical for real life, as due to unusual design it was impossible to backup without doors open wide. So, such doors were originally offered as a practical measure that helped the driver. Besides, traditional swing-open doors would make it more difficult to get out of the vehicle due to high door sills. The doors were used on the Countach's successor, the Diablo, on its replacement, the Murciélago, and on a low-production run derivative of the Murciélago called the Reventón. The Revuelto is the latest Lamborghini car to feature these doors. They are trademarked. Having used the exotic door style for several of its cars, the Italian manufacturer has become synonymous with the implementation of scissor doors, which are sometimes colloquially referred to as "Lambo doors".

Today many aftermarket companies are specialized in production of scissor door conversion kits for regular production cars that originally come with regular doors. A common scissor door conversion kit (also known as a "Lambo-door" kit) includes model specific redesigned door hinges and gas filled shocks. Such kits are usually bolt-on or weld on and require some modifications to front bumpers and door panels. Original door panels are not replaced, so a vehicle looks standard from the outside, when the doors are closed.

The hinge is placed in a similar location to a conventional door, so a convertible version of the car is possible with the same door style.

== Types ==
There are different types of scissor doors. The conventional type rotates to 90 degrees. Scissor doors can be powered and they usually are.

=== Vertical lift system ===
Vertical lift system (VLS) doors have a scissor door configuration. The biggest difference is that they are designed to initially open slightly outward before opening upward to allow the top edge of the door to clear the door frame and A-pillar. Although butterfly doors also move upwards and outwards, VLS doors are not the same as butterfly doors as VLS doors move outward only a small degree compared to butterfly doors.

=== 130 degrees ===
Although conventional scissor doors rotate to 90 degrees, some can rotate up to 130 degrees; these are commonly used for modified cars. Such scissor doors have the benefit of not obstructing the entrance or exit to the car as much as conventional scissor doors. VLS doors also can be made to rotate to 130 degrees.

=== Scissor-conventional door hybrid ===
Some aftermarket example scissor doors are also designed so they can open either vertically (scissor door) or horizontally (conventional door), as the user chooses. Such doors allow the user to gain the benefits of both types of door, choosing to open the doors in whichever style is best suited to the situation.

== In popular culture ==
Scissor doors are widely noted as a status symbol in popular culture. In 2012, Migos released a track called "Lambo Doors," in the first line referring to an observer who has never seen such high-status doors. In 2017, Rick Ross released a track called "Lamborghini Doors", in which he notes a number of objects that are rising up like the titular doors. In the TV series Silicon Valley, the character Russ Hanneman remarks that he feels poor when he has regular car doors, rather than doors that go "like this" (gesturing as if his arms were gull-wing doors) or "like this" (gesturing as if his arms were scissor doors), leading to other commentators referring to scissor doors as "billionaire doors".

== See also ==
- Butterfly doors
- Canopy door
- Gull-wing doors
- List of cars with non-standard door designs
- Sliding doors
- Suicide doors
- Swan doors
