= Alfa Romeo Caimano =

Concept car designed by Italdesign

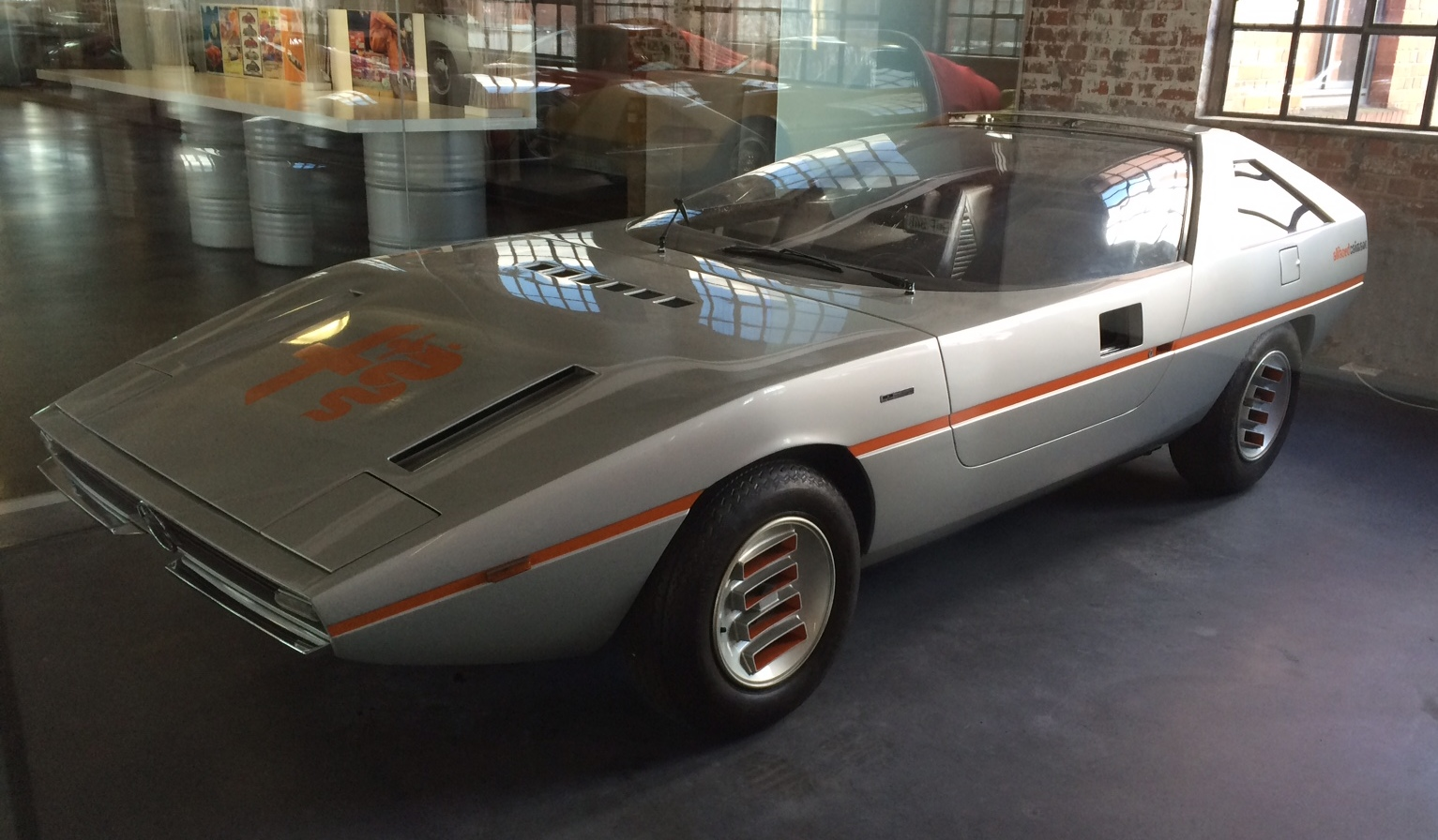

Overview
- Manufacturer: Alfa Romeo
- Also called: Alfasud Caimano
- Production: 1971; 1 made
- Designer: Giorgetto Giugiaro at Italdesign

Body and chassis
- Class: Concept car
- Body style: Coupe
- Layout: Front-engine, front-wheel-drive
- Related: Alfa Romeo Alfasud

Powertrain
- Engine: 1.3 L (1,286 cc) Boxer H4
- Transmission: 5-speed manual

Dimensions
- Wheelbase: 2,250 mm (88.6 in)
- Length: 3,920 mm (154.3 in)
- Width: 1,650 mm (65.0 in)
- Height: 1,090 mm (42.9 in)

The Alfa Romeo Caimano is a concept car designed by Giorgetto Giugiaro of Italdesign and presented at the Turin Motor Show in 1971. The car is exhibited at the Museo Storico Alfa Romeo.

== Design ==
The Caimano features many unconventional design elements, one of the most striking being its large glass canopy-windshield, which incorporates the doors as well. The B and C pillars form a trapezoidal roll bar in the rear of the car, which also doubles as an adjustable spoiler which can be controlled from inside the cabin. Other features include two smaller windows on the doors for ventilation or paying toll, pop up headlights, a large Alfa Romeo logo printed on the hood in burnt orange and a cylindrical dashboard.

== Specifications ==
The Caimano is based on the mechanicals of the Alfa Romeo Alfasud, using a 1.3 L (1,286 cc) Boxer H4 engine producing 86 bhp (64 kW) and connected to a 5 speed manual transmission. The chassis is taken from the Alfasud as well, but has been shortened by almost 8 inches.

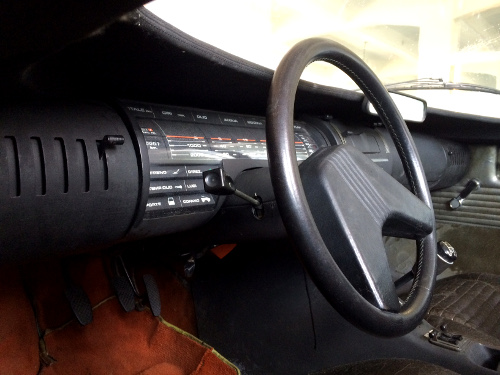
Caimano interior close up
