= Alfa Romeo Alfasud =

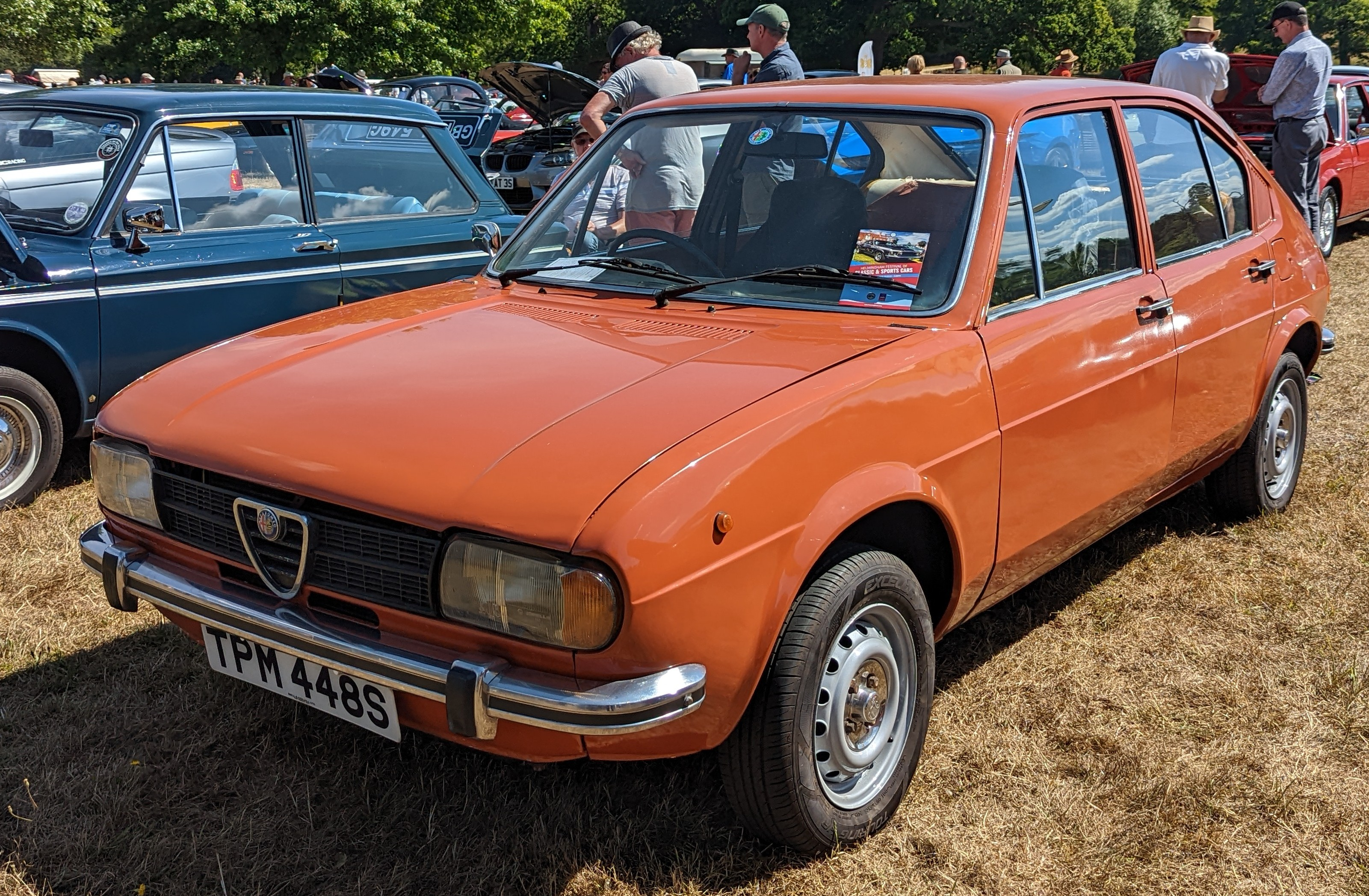
- Alfa Romeo Alfasud 4-door saloon

Overview
- Manufacturer: Alfa Romeo
- Also called: Alfa Romeo Export GTA (South Africa)
- Production: 1971–1983 (berlina); 1976–1989 (Sprint)
- Assembly: Italy: Pomigliano d'Arco plant, Campania; Malaysia: Shah Alam (Swedish Motor Assemblies); Malta: Marsa (Car Assembly Ltd); South Africa: Brits
- Designer: Giorgetto Giugiaro at Italdesign

Body and chassis
- Class: Small family car (C)
- Body style: 2/4-door saloon; 3/5-door hatchback; 3-door coupé (Alfasud Sprint); 3-door estate (Giardinetta)
- Layout: Longitudinal front-engine, front-wheel-drive
- Related: Alfa Romeo Sprint; Alfa Romeo Caimano

Powertrain
- Engine: 1.2 L (1,186 cc) Boxer H4; 1.3 L (1,286 cc) Boxer H4; 1.4 L (1,350 cc) Boxer H4; 1.5 L (1,490 cc) Boxer H4
- Transmission: 4-speed manual 5-speed manual

Dimensions
- Wheelbase: 2,455 mm (96.7 in)
- Length: 3,890 mm (153 in); 3,935–3,975 mm (154.9–156.5 in) (Giardinetta)
- Width: 1,590 mm (63 in)
- Height: 1,370 mm (54 in)
- Kerb weight: 810–865 kg (1,786–1,907 lb) (approx.)

Chronology
- Successor: Alfa Romeo 33; Alfa Romeo Arna

The Alfa Romeo Alfasud (Type 901, 902 and 904) is a small family car manufactured and marketed from 1971 to 1989 by Alfa Romeo as a front-engine, four-door, five-passenger entry-level model over a single generation — with facelifts in 1977 and 1980. There was also a two-door sedan, only available in "ti" trim. Alfa Romeo subsequently introduced a three-door wagon variant, the Giardinetta (1975); two-door coupé, the Alfasud Sprint (1976); three-door hatchback (1981) and finally the five-door hatchback (1982).

Assembly was primarily at the Alfa Romeo Pomigliano d'Arco plant, and 893,719 were manufactured from 1972 to 1983, with the addition of 121,434 Sprint coupé versions between 1976 and 1989.

Developed by Austrian engineer, Rudolf Hruska, the Alfasud was noted for its boxer engine configuration, low center of gravity, aerodynamic profile, class-leading handling, styling by Giorgetto Giugiaro of ItalDesign, and a conspicuous susceptibility to rust.

== History ==
=== Background and development ===
Alfa Romeo had explored building a smaller front wheel drive car in the 1950s but it was not until 1967 that firm plans were laid down for an all-new model to fit in below the existing Alfa Romeo range.

The car was manufactured at a new factory at Pomigliano d'Arco in southern Italy, hence the car's name, Alfa Sud (Alfa South). January 18, 1968, saw the registration at Naples of a new company named "Industria Napoletana Costruzioni Autoveicoli Alfa Romeo-Alfasud S.p.A.". 90% of the share capital was subscribed by Alfa Romeo and 10% by Finmeccanica, at that time the financial arm of the government controlled IRI. Construction work on the company's new state-sponsored plant at nearby Pomigliano d'Arco began in April 1968, on the site of an aircraft engine factory used by Alfa Romeo during World War II.

=== Launch ===
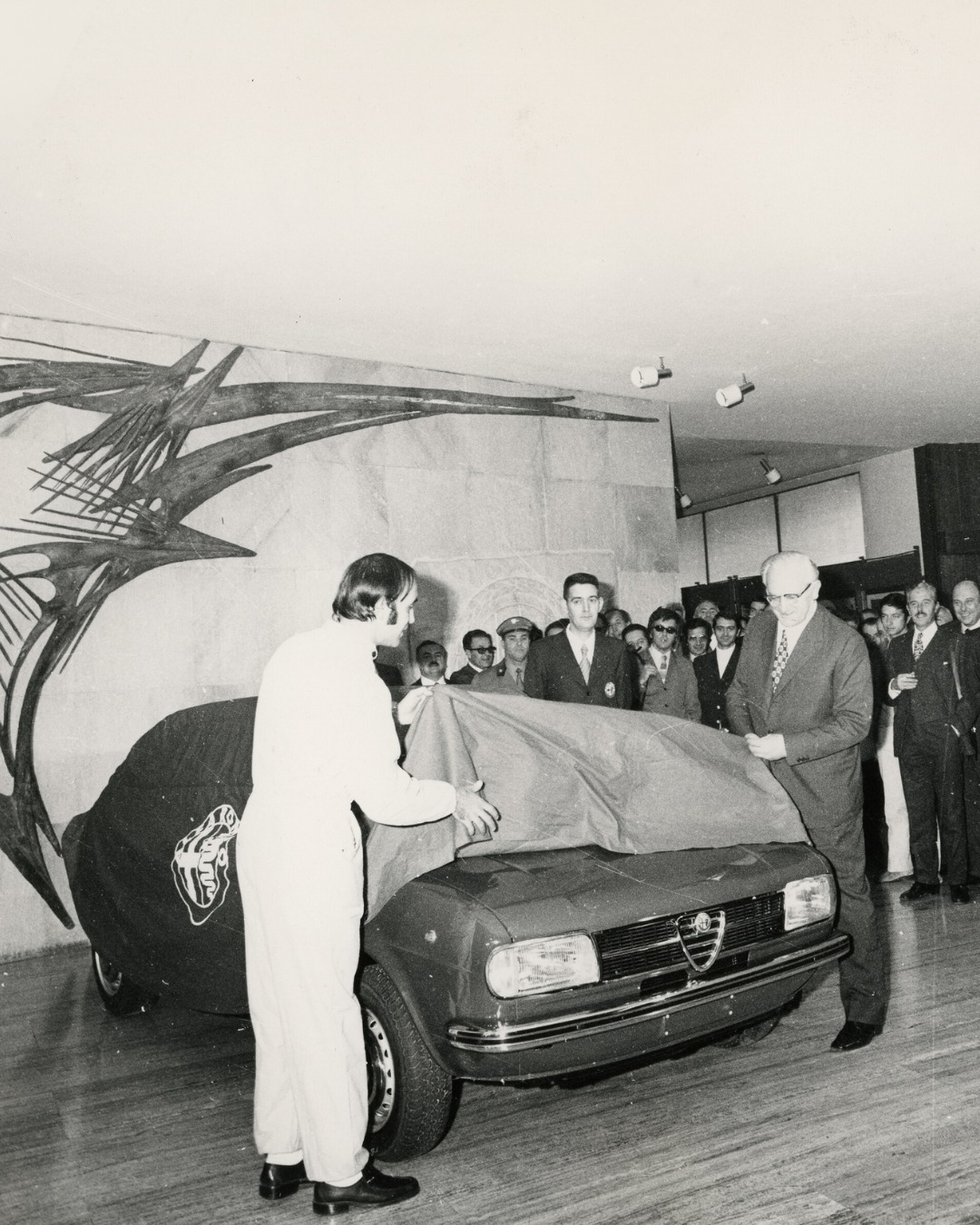
President of Alfa Romeo, Giuseppe Luraghi and others, unveiling the Alfasud at Turin Auto Show in November 1971.

The Alfasud debuted at the Turin Motor Show in 1971, featuring front wheel drive with a Boxer of 1,186 cc water-cooled engine with a belt-driven overhead camshaft on each cylinder head; front (MacPherson struts and rear beam axle with Watt's linkage; inboard front disc brakes as well as rear disc brakes as well as rack and pinion steering. The boxer engine allowed a low hood/bonnet line, contributing to an aerodynamic profile, a low center of gravity, and noteworthy road-holding and handling. Despite its two-box shape, the Alfasud was not initially offered as a hatchback. Lights, turn indicators, horn, wipers and heater fan were operated by two column stalks.

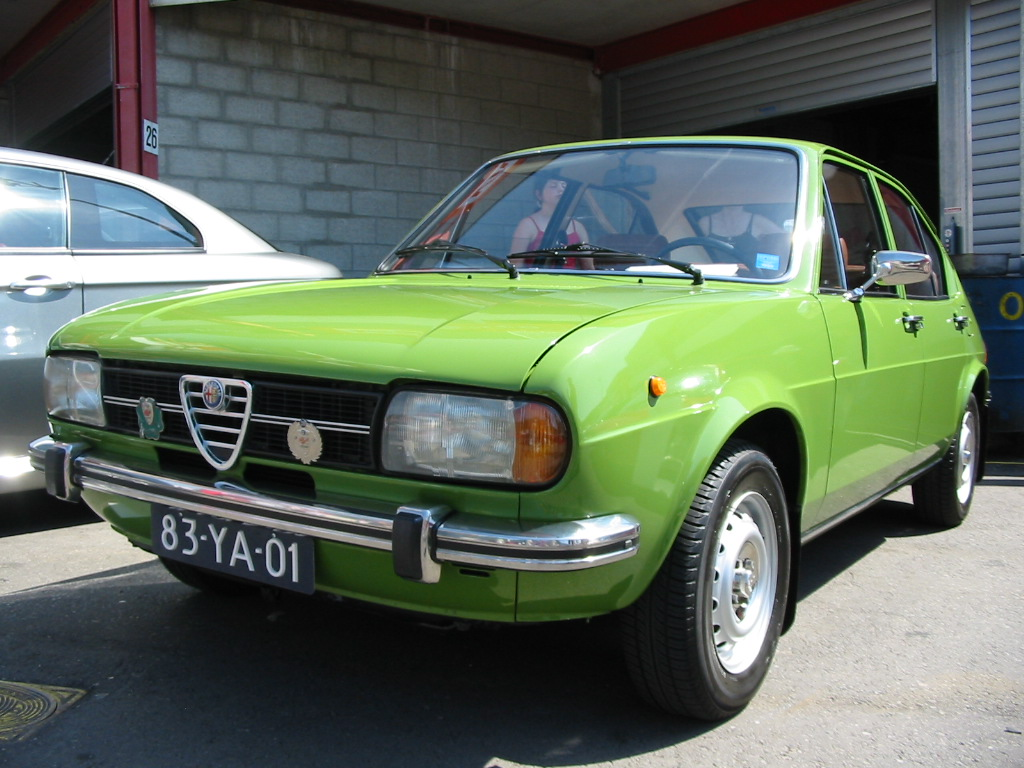
First series Alfasud

=== The range grows ===
In November 1973 the first Alfasud sport model joined the range, the two-door Alfasud ti—(Turismo Internazionale, or Touring International). Along with a 5-speed gearbox, it featured a more powerful version of the 1.2 litre engine, brought to 68 PS (50 kW; 67 hp) by adopting a Weber twin-choke carburettor, allowing the small saloon to reach 160 km/h (99 mph). Quad round halogen headlamps, special wheels, a front body-colour spoiler beneath the bumper and rear black one around the tail distinguished the "ti", while inside there was a three-spoke steering wheel, auxiliary gauges, leatherette/cloth seats, and carpets in place of rubber mats.

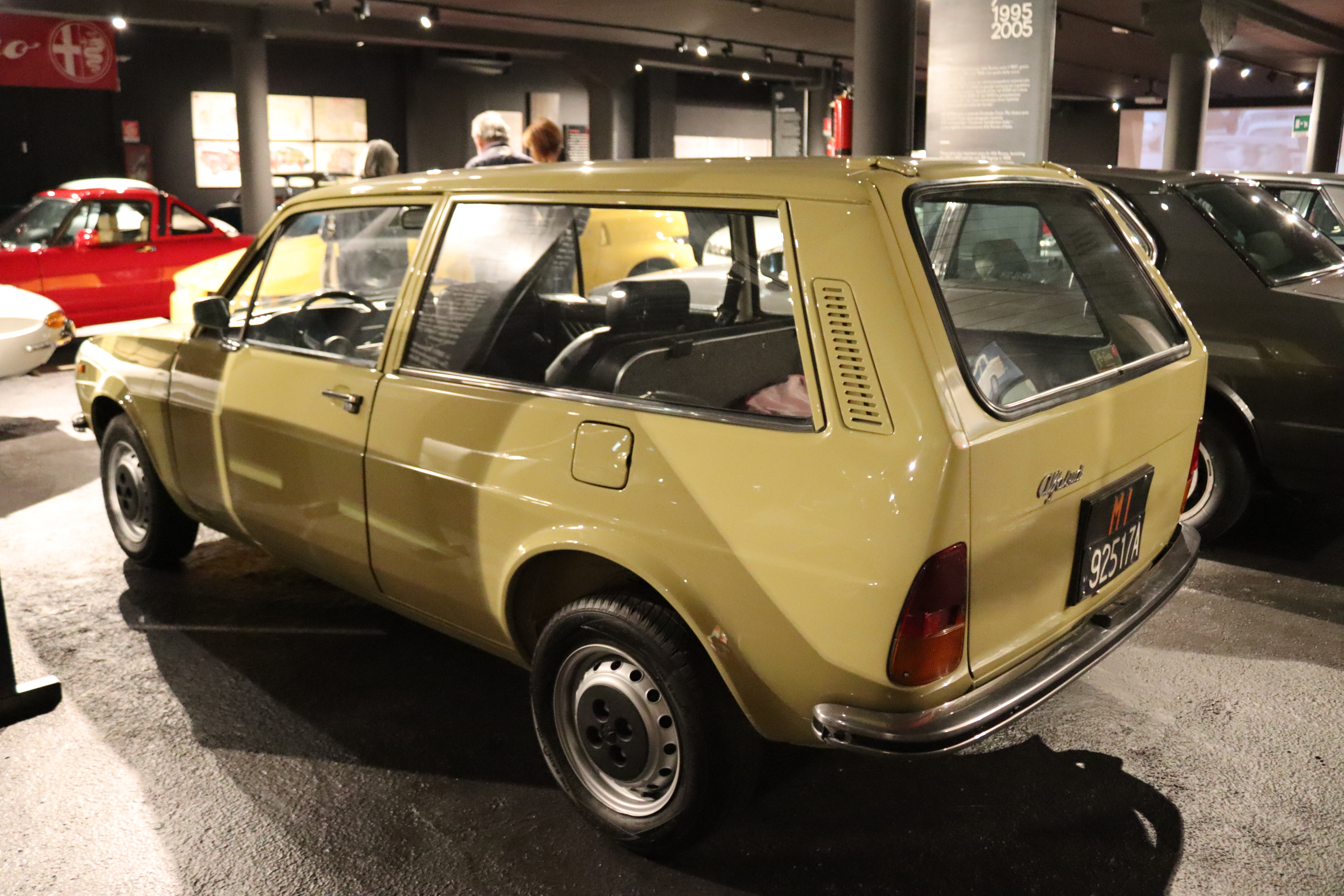
1975–1978 Alfasud Giardinetta

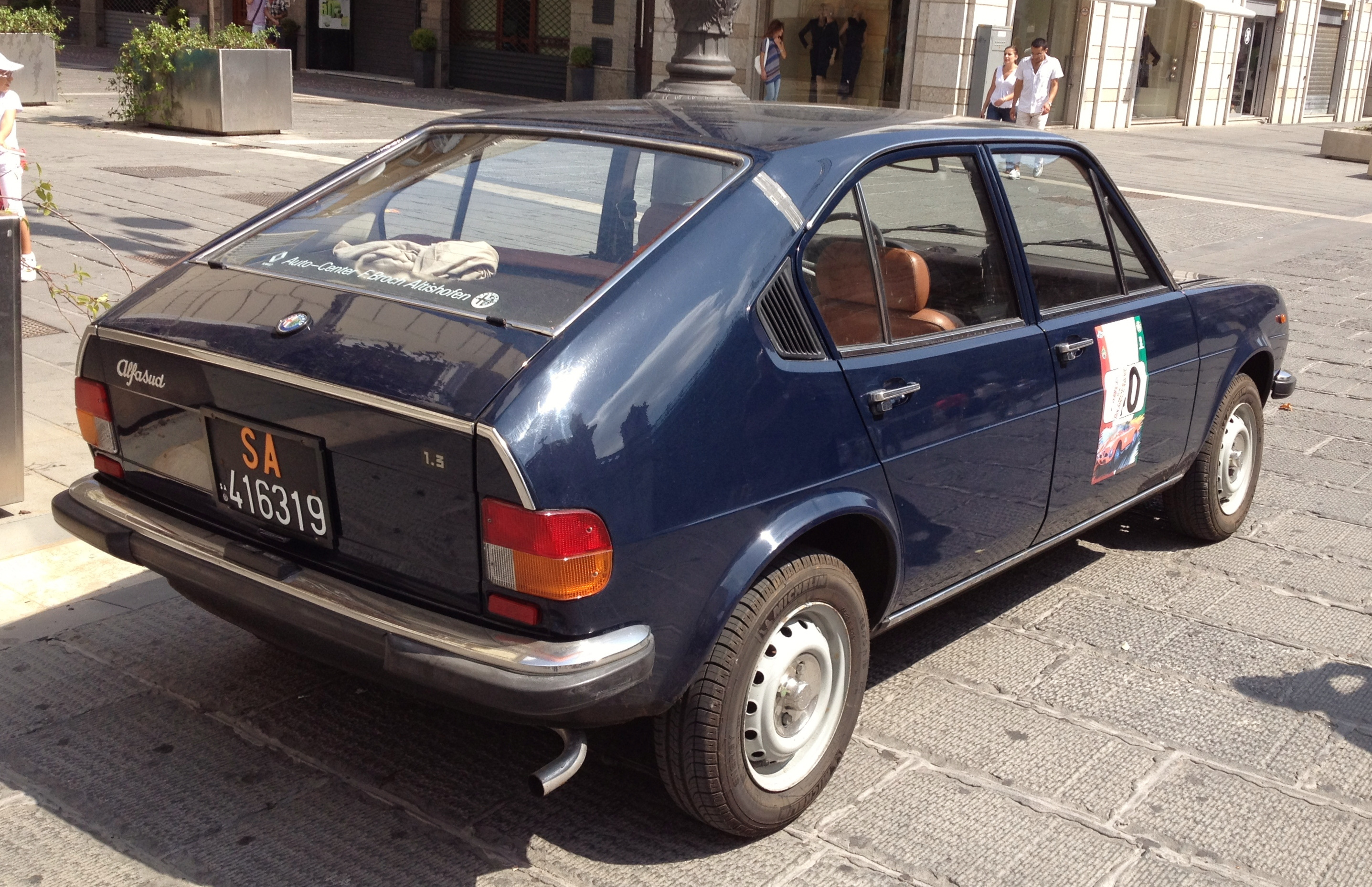
Alfasud Super 1.3

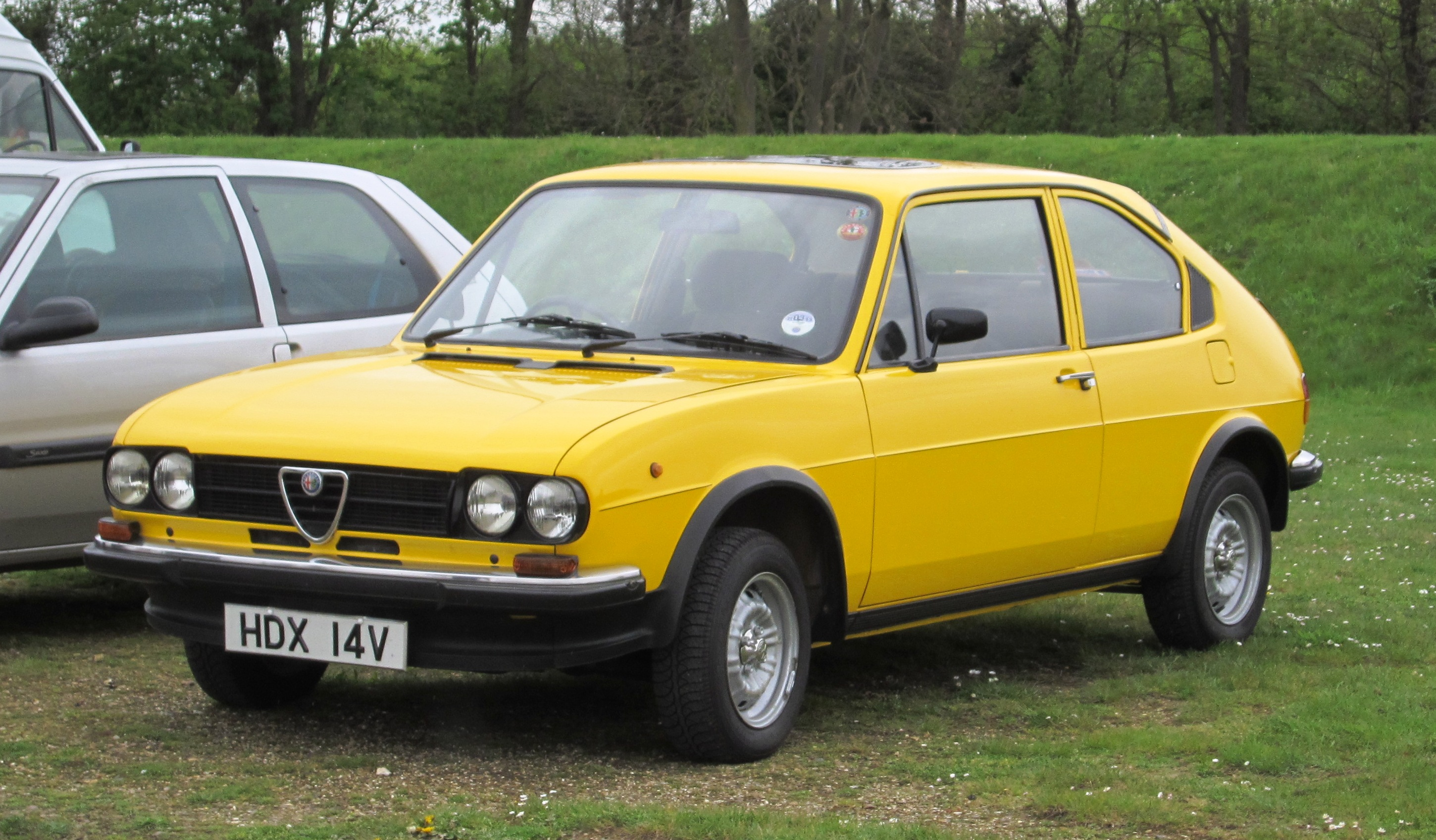
1979 Alfasud ti 1.5

In 1974, Alfa Romeo launched a more upscale model, the Alfasud SE. The SE was replaced by the Alfasud L (Lusso) model introduced at the Bruxelles Motor Show in January 1975. Recognizable by its bumper overriders and chrome strips on the door sills and on the tail, the Lusso was better appointed than the standard Alfasud (which was now called "normale"), with such features as cloth upholstery, headrests, padded dashboard with glove compartment and optional tachometer. A three-door estate model called the Alfasud Giardinetta was introduced in May 1975, with the same equipment of the Alfasud "L".

The Lusso model was produced until 1976, and was then replaced by the new Alfasud 5m (5 marce, five speed) model, the first four-door Alfasud with a five-speed gearbox. Presented at the March 1976 Geneva Motor Show, it was equipped like the Lusso it replaced.

In September 1976, the Alfasud Sprint coupé was launched. Built on the same platform of the saloon, it featured lower, more angular bodywork, again by Giorgetto Giugiaro, and featured a hatchback. The Sprint was powered by a new, more powerful Boxer, stroked from the 1.2 to displace 1,286 cc (78 cu in) and develop 76 PS (56 kW; 75 hp), and was paired the five-speed gearbox. The same 1286 cc engine was later fitted into the 2-door saloon, creating the Alfasud ti 1.3, which was put on sale alongside the "ti" 1.2 in July 1977.

=== 1978 revisions ===
In late 1977 the Alfasud Super replaced the range-topping four-door "5m". It was available with both the 1.2- and 1.3-litre engines from the "ti", though both were equipped with a single-choke carburettor. The Super introduced improvements both outside, with new bumpers including large plastic strips, and inside, with a revised dashboard, new door cards and the choice of either Alfatex (vinyl) or two-tone cloth seats. Similar upgrades were applied to the Giardinetta.

In May 1978 the Sprint and "ti" got new engines, a 79 PS (58 kW; 78 hp) 1.3 (1,350 cc) and an 85 PS (63 kW; 84 hp) 1.5 (1,490 cc), both with a twin-choke carburettor. At the same time the Alfasud ti received cosmetic updates: bumpers from the Super, new rear spoiler on the boot lid, black wheel arch extensions and black front spoiler, and was upgraded to the revised interior of the Super. The 1.3 and 1.5 engines were soon made available alongside the 1.2 on the Giardinetta and Super, with a slightly lower output compared to the sport models, due to having a single-choke carburettor. In 1979 the Sprint was given a double twin-choke carburettor setup and became the Alfasud Sprint Veloce.

=== 1980 facelift ===
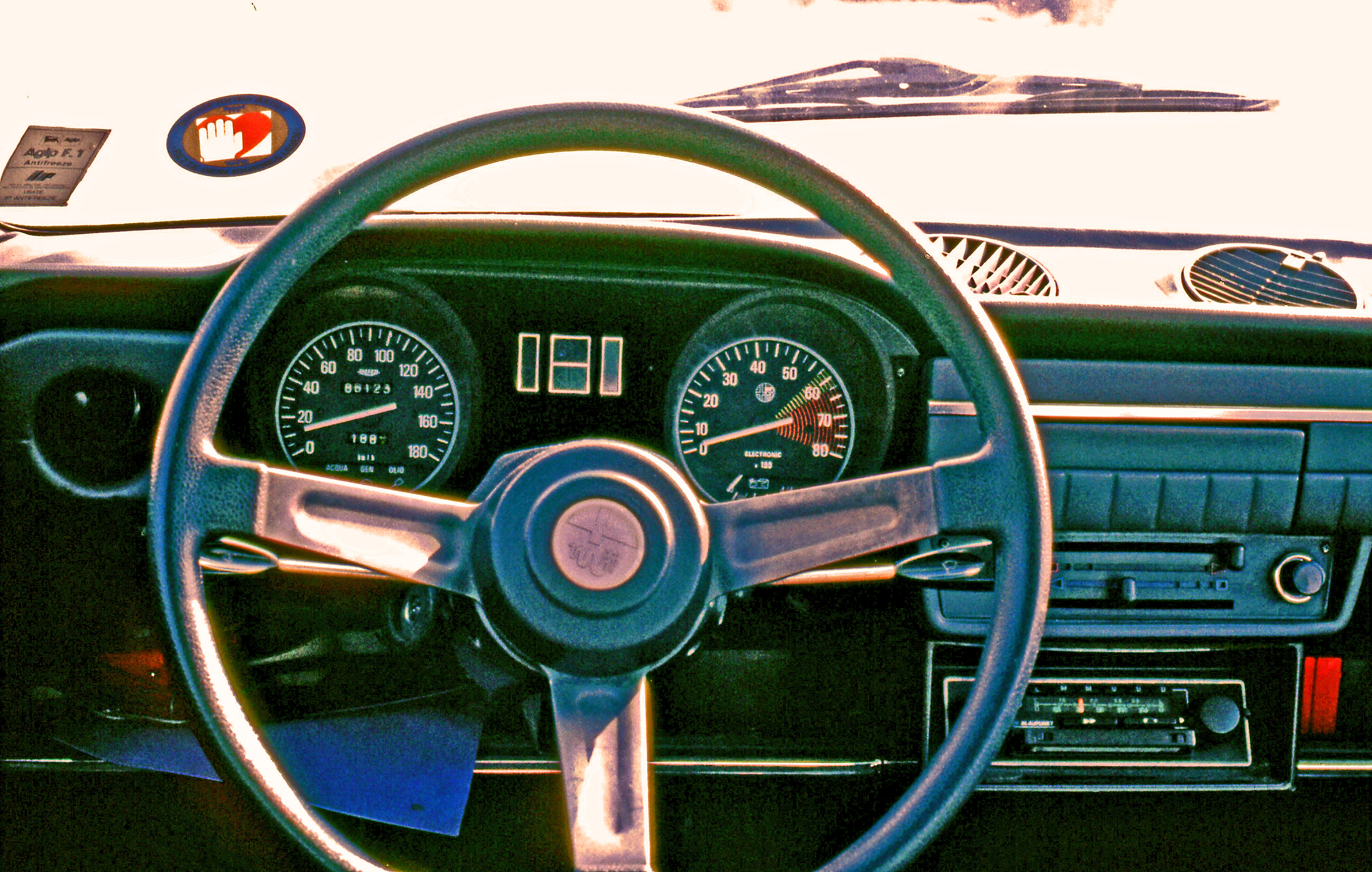
Series 1 Alfa Romeo Alfasud dashboard.

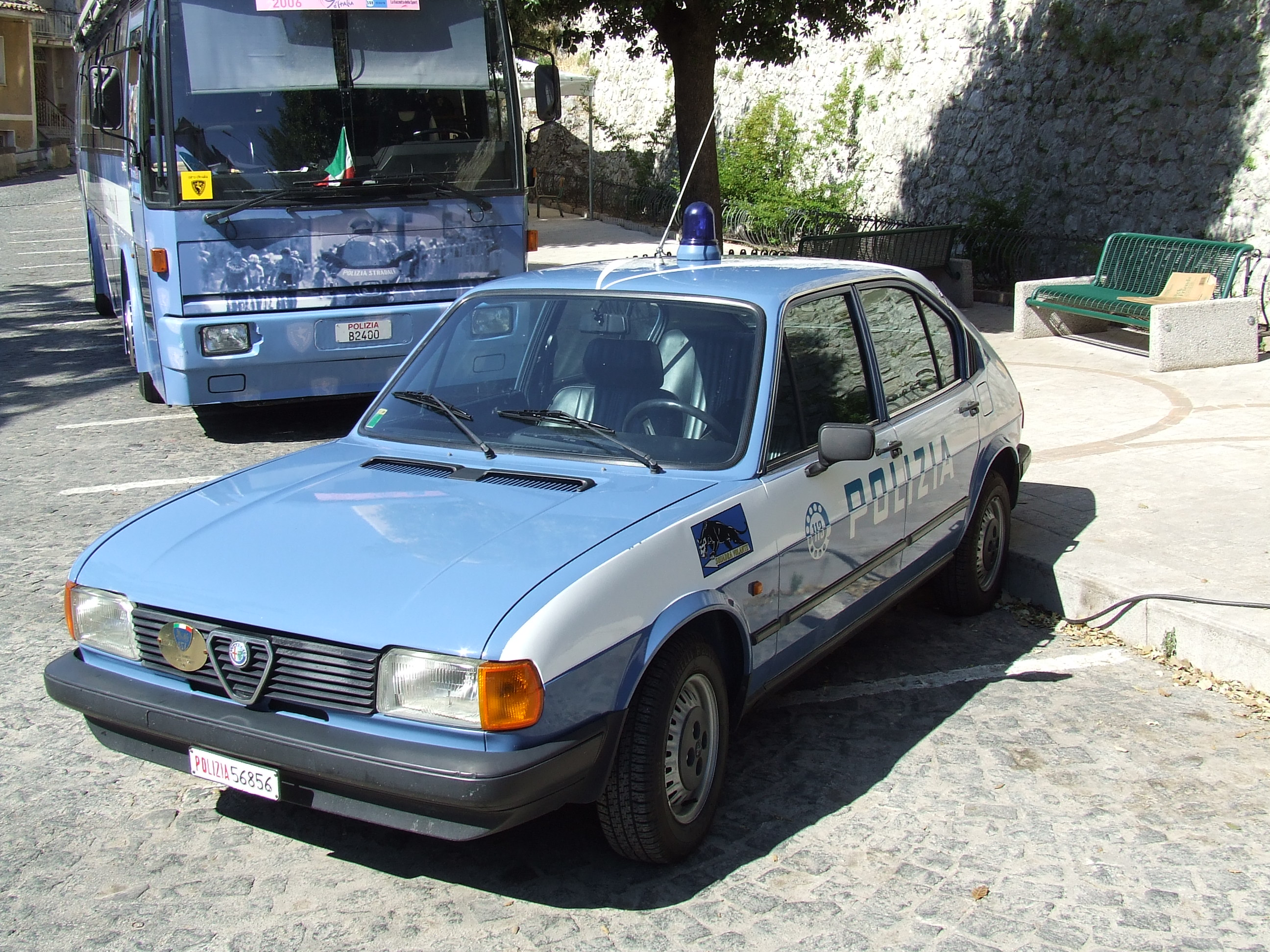
Series 3 Alfasud for Polizia di Stato.

All Alfasuds were upgraded in 1980 with plastic bumpers, a new instrument panel, headlamps and rear lights, as well as other revisions. The Ti version was fitted with a twin-carburetor version of the 1490 cc engine that had been fitted to the Sprint the previous year, developing 95 bhp (71 kW; 96 PS) A three-door hatchback was added to the range in 1981 in either SC or Ti trim, and the two-door Ti and Giardinetta were deleted from most markets around that time. Belatedly, in 1982 the four-door cars were replaced by five-door versions, as by now, most of its competitors were producing a hatchback of that size, although some also produced a saloon alternative. The range was topped by the five-door Gold Cloverleaf, featuring the 95 PS (70 kW; 94 hp) engine from the Ti and enhanced interior trim.

In 1983 an attempt to keep pace with the hot hatchback market, the final version of the Alfasud Ti received a tuned 1490 cc engine developing 105 PS (77 kW; 104 hp). Named Quadrifoglio Verde (Green Cloverleaf), the model was also fitted with Michelin low-profile TRX tyres on metric rims (tyre size 190/55 VR 340 TRX) as well as an enhanced level of equipment.

=== Rust ===
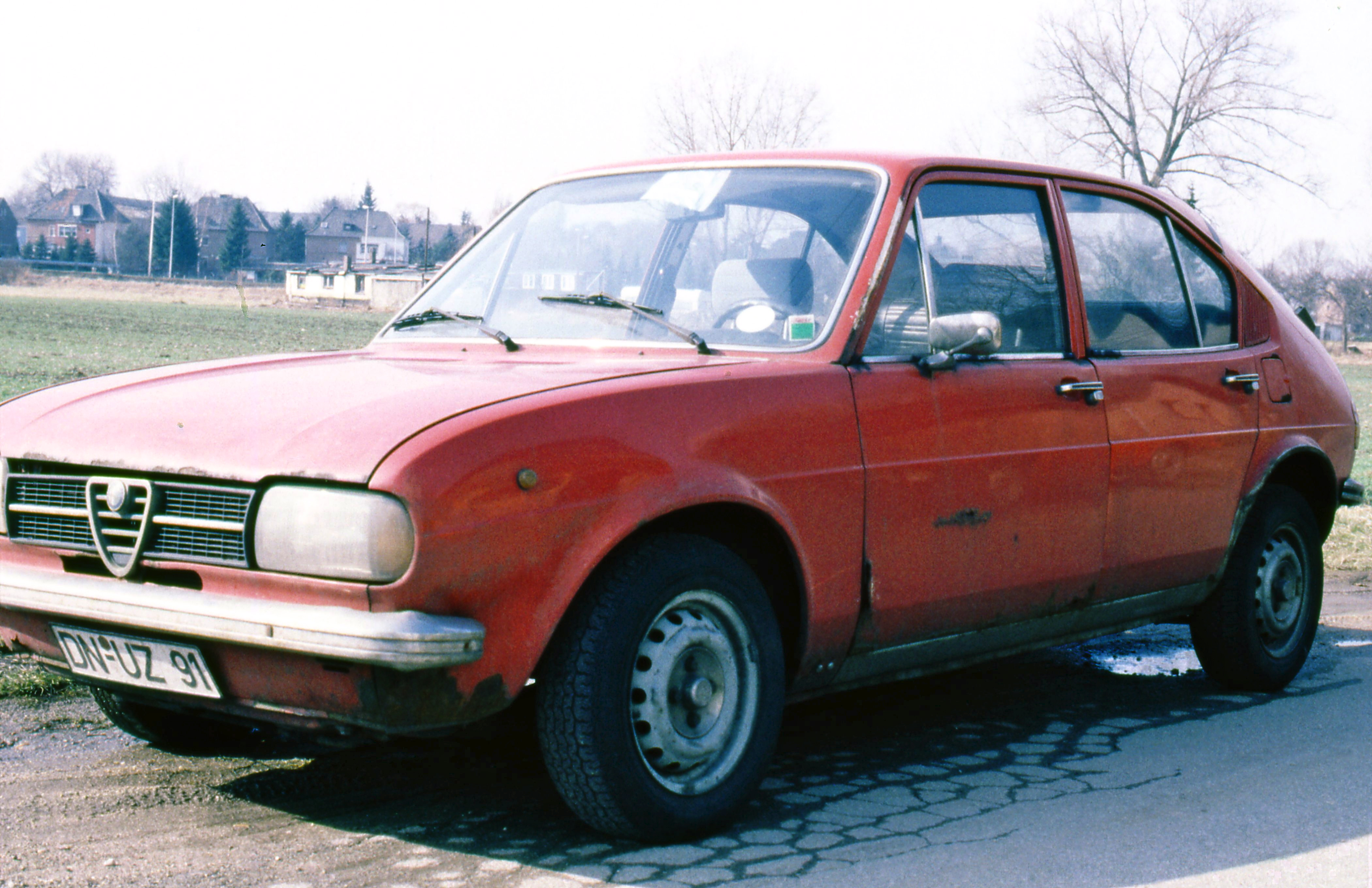
Rusty Alfa Romeo Alfasud (about 6 years, and 88,000 km old).

The Alfasud became notorious for its propensity to rust, notably because of an assembly process that combined inferior recycled steel, and the factory's Pomigliano d'Arco location just 15 kilometers from the Bay of Naples. In one instance, early bodies in white, ready for painting, were left in the naturally salty air outside of the assembly building. To inhibit rust, engineers called for filling all bodywork box-sections with synthetic foam, which was later discovered to hold moisture.

=== End of production ===
In 1983, the five-door Alfasud saloons were replaced by the 33 models. The 33 was an evolution of the Alfasud's floorpan and running gear, including minor suspension alterations, and a change from four-wheel disc brakes to front discs and rear drum brakes to reduce costs. The Alfasud Sprint was renamed the Alfa Romeo Sprint in 1983. That model was continued until 1989 by sharing 33's running gear. The three-door versions continued for a further year before being replaced by the unsuccessful Alfa Romeo Arna, a joint venture between Alfa Romeo and Nissan.

=== Foreign assembly ===
The Alfasud was also assembled in Malaysia by City Motors of Ipoh, although the plant was located in Kuala Lumpur. Malaysian cars received the 1.2, 1.35, and 1.5 litre engines, and all had the four-door bodywork. In South Africa, Alfa Romeo's local subsidiary built the Alfasud in its plant in Brits. Beginning in June 1981, the South African-made Alfasud was renamed the Alfa Romeo Export GTA and received the 105 PS (77 kW) version of the 1.5 litre flat-four. The Export GTA had the five-door bodywork.

== Engines ==
- 1971–1983 1.2 L (1,186 cc) Alfa Romeo Boxer H4, 63–68 PS (46–50 kW)
- 1977–1983 1.3 L (1,286 cc) Alfa Romeo Boxer H4, 68–75 PS (50–55 kW)
- 1978–1983 1.4 L (1,350 cc) Alfa Romeo Boxer H4, 79 PS (58 kW)
- 1978–1984 1.5 L (1,490 cc) Alfa Romeo Boxer H4, 85–105 PS (63–77 kW)

== Motorsport ==
From 1975, a racing series was organised exclusively for Alfasuds. One year later, the Alfasud Trophy began in Italy and Austria, and later France and Germany got their own competitions. In 1977 the "Trofeo Europa Alfasud" was set up, in which the best drivers from each country competed. The Trofeo Alfasud was equipped with the 1,286 cc engine with an Autodelta kit. Gerhard Berger is probably the best-known driver to participate in the Alfasud Trofeo.

An Alfasud Ti contested the 1980 Hardie-Ferodo 1000 at Bathurst in Australia, placing fourth in the up to 1600 cc class. Jon Dooley, Rob Kirby and Andrew Thorpe took part in the 1982 British Saloon Car Championship season, using an Alfasud Ti and an Alfasud Sprint.

The Alfasud Ti also competed successfully in Rallying, with class wins in the prestigious Monte Carlo Rally in 1979, 1980, 1982, 1983, 1984 and 1985.

Legendary 3 time Formula 1 World Champion Ayrton Senna, had an Alfasud Ti 1.5L. He drove it to his first F1 test with Williams Racing.

An Alfasud driven by Peter Dew with John Pugh, participated in the first Himalayan Rally held in India, in 1980

== Concept cars ==
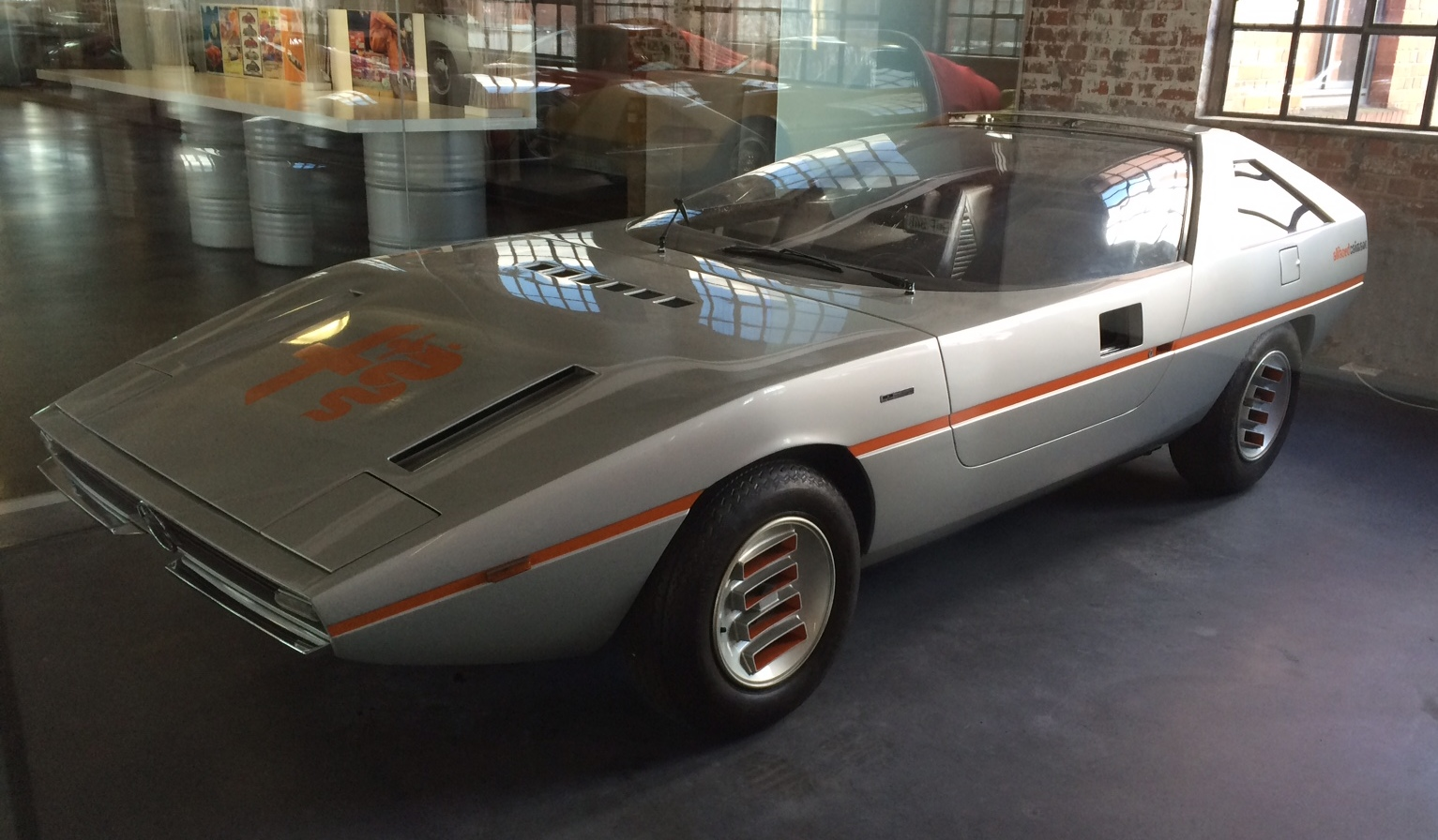
Alfa Romeo Caimano concept

=== Alfa Romeo Caimano ===
The Alfa Romeo Caimano is a concept car designed in 1971 by Giorgetto Giugiaro at Italdesign Giugiaro. It uses the same mechanicals and frame from the Alfasud, but with an 8-inch (200 mm) shorter wheelbase.

== Famous conversions ==
- Gian Franco Mantovani Wainer produced a one-off Bimotore version, with two 1,186 cc engines and four-wheel drive for rallying. Wainer also produced a turbocharged Turbowainer model in 1983.
- The Alfasud was the basis of the Minari kit car designed by Andy Borrowman and Sean Prendergast. Approximately 120 cars were sold throughout the 1990s.
- The Australian Giocattolo used the Alfasud Sprint body as the basis of a mid-engined car.

== See also ==
- Alfa Romeo Sprint
