= Alfa Romeo Pomigliano d'Arco plant =

Car factory in Italy

Coordinates: 40.926756°N 14.401279°E

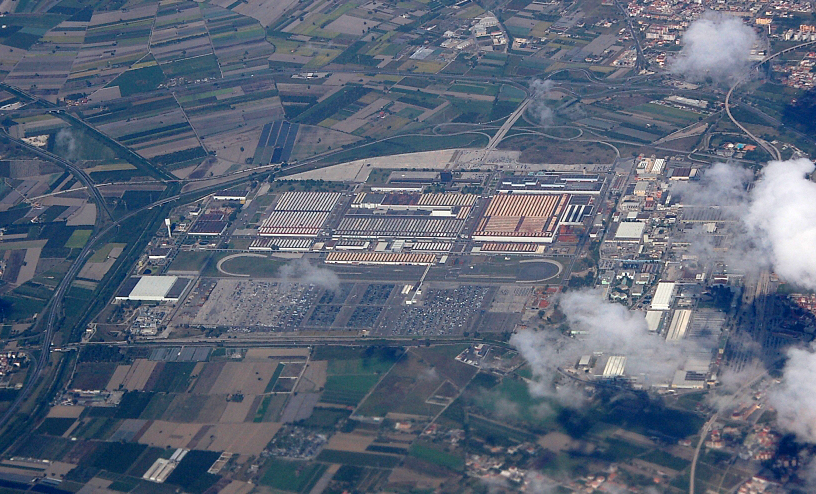
Aerial view, 2010

The Alfa Romeo Pomigliano d'Arco plant, commonly called simply Stellantis Pomigliano, is an automotive assembly plant now owned by Stellantis, officially known as the Giambattista Vico Plant since 2008, in memory of the Neapolitan philosopher. The plant, originally designed and constructed in 1968 by Alfa Romeo, is located largely in the town of Pomigliano d'Arco, and partially in the town of Acerra, employing roughly 6,000.

Production began in 1972, and Alfa Romeo production ended with the Alfa Romeo 159 in October 2011, restarting in 2022 with the Tonale. The factory began assembling the current generation Fiat Panda in 2011.

== History ==
=== The first plant ===
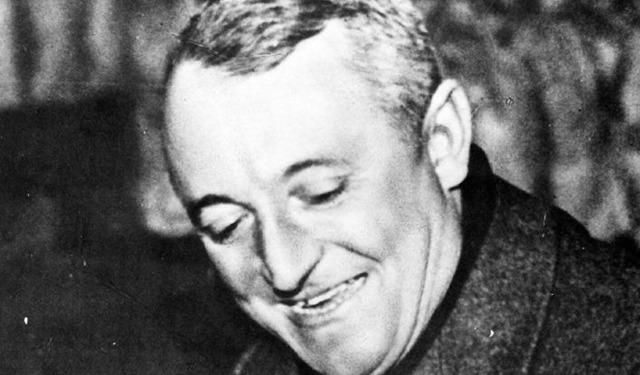
Ugo Gobbato (1888–1945) was the first director.

In 1938 the Istituto per la Ricostruzione Industriale commissioned Alfa Romeo to build a large plant for the production of aircraft engines coupled with a small airport.

The choice fell on Pomigliano d'Arco, and thanks to the work of the engineer Ugo Gobbato it gave birth to a technologically advanced Aeronautical Center, able to produce engines for the technologically advanced era. The industrial complex completed just before the outbreak of World War II was one of the largest and most modern in Europe. To improve the living conditions of employees, residents in the area, there was built from scratch an entire neighborhood with about six hundred homes each of which had a small garden, while a 700 person hotel was built for visitors.

See Alfa Romeo Avio

In 1942 began series production of Daimler engines, the most commonly used by German companies. In 1943 the complex was completed with two other aerospace centers of production, for "complete structures" and "light alloys". Shortly after, two bombs destroyed the cities along the Alfa Romeo factory.

=== Reconstruction ===
The production of aircraft engines did not start until 1952, when the reconstruction and establishment of the city was done.

Meanwhile, Finmeccanica had founded, in part of the Aeronautical Center, the Officine di Costruzioni Aeronautiche e Ferroviarie Aerfer. Initially there was produced railway vehicles and trolleybuses then the '"Aerfer" also worked on commission for the production of parts for fighter jets for the Air Force and NATO. Just the experience of construction of these parts, since the second half of the fifties, the Pomigliano began to be based development and construction of new prototypes for fighter aircraft, whose projects were financially supported by the United States.

The Renault Dauphine was manufactured under license at the Pomigliano d'Arco plant as well as at Portello, Milan from 1959 to 1964 by Alfa Romeo and marketed as the Dauphine Alfa Romeo. It featured a Magneti-Marelli 12 volt electrical system, rather than 6 volt in the French model, and carried "Dauphine Alfa Romeo" or "Ondine Alfa Romeo" logos. Fiat, Alfa Romeo's main competitor in the home market, successfully lobbied to have taxation classifications based on overall length rather than engine displacement, successfully damping Dauphine sales.

=== The birth of the Alfasud ===
At the end of the sixties Alfa Romeo had two factories in Italy: the first built in 1910 in Portello, a suburb of Milan, the second was the Alfa Romeo factory in Arese opened in 1963, in the province of Milan. In this period the Italian Government, the owner of IRI and then of Alfa Romeo decided to implement some measures to encourage the development of southern Italy and stem the emigration of many young people who moved to the north in search of work. So, with the opposition of the then President of Alfa Giuseppe Luraghi, it financed the construction of a new factory for the production of cars next to the existing facility "Alfa Romeo Avio" Pomigliano d'Arco. Thus was born the great project called "Alfasud".

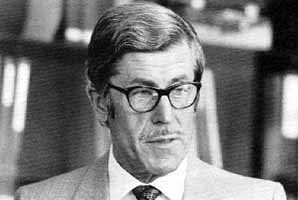
Rudolf Hruska (1905–95) oversaw the new Alfasud plant from 1967.

The plant for car manufacturing was made very quickly. In 1967 was started the design of the plant and the new car model (the ' Alfasud ), both under the technical responsibility by engineer Rudolf Hruska, one of the most important engineers of the era, former "right hand" of Ferdinand Porsche and consultant to Fiat, Simca and Abarth.

The management of the operation, led by Hruska, was made completely independent by creating Alfasud S.p.A., based in Pomigliano d'Arco, which operated in the establishment and completion of the design of the new model, in a formally independent from the so-called "Alfanord" in Arese.

On 15 January 1968, after dozens of projects proposed and discussed, the general plan was submitted on for building the plant Alfasud Pomigliano d'Arco, which included the construction of new plants and beginning production in January 1972 .

The 'Construction Industry Neapolitan Vehicles Alfa Romeo - Alfasud S.p.A. was born on 17 January 1968 with shareholders Alfa Romeo (88%), Finmeccanica (10%) and IRI (2%). For the project were allocated just over 300 billion lire largely funded by the Cassa per il Mezzogiorno and Banco di Napoli.

The laying of the cornerstone took place on 28 April 1968, in the presence of Prime Minister Aldo Moro.

Despite several delays, due to the many strikes by organized workers, Hruska was able to complete the work and begin production, with only three months late, in April 1972 .

=== From the 1980s to today ===
In 1982 the ' Alfasud S.p.A. changed its name to "INCA Investments".

In 1986, Finmeccanica was forced to sell Alfa Romeo shares to Fiat for financial reasons and therefore the plant became part of Fiat Group.

Under new management, following the merger between Lancia and Alfa Romeo, the factory was renamed "Plant Alfa-Lancia Pomigliano d'Arco".

Following the corporate restructuring of 2007 the Fiat Group auto business become Fiat Group Automobiles S.p.A., Alfa turned into Alfa Romeo Automobiles S.p.A. as a result, in 2008, the factory was renamed to "Fiat Group Automobiles - Giambattista Vico plant."

On July 19 of 2010 Fiat sells ownership of the factory and its workers' contractual relationship to the subsidiary factory Pomigliano Italy.

=== The first car ===
The first car produced at the plant, was the Alfasud. It was the first front wheel drive Alfa Romeo production car, until then all the cars produced by Alfa were rear-wheel drive. The Alfasud was presented in 1971 at the Turin Motor Show. It was a hatchback with a tail fastback four-door (tailgate came only in 1982 ). The commercialization of the first series gave enormous fruits, because sales in those years amounted to about seventy thousand vehicles.

== List of cars produced to date ==
Image	Brand	Model	Production start	Production end	Production number
	Alfa Romeo	Alfasud (first serie)	1972	1980	642,528
	Alfa Romeo	Alfasud Giardinetta	1975	1980	5,097
	Alfa Romeo	Alfasud Sprint	1976	1988	121,184
	Alfa Romeo	Alfasud (second serie)	1980	1984	203,904
	Alfa Romeo	33 (first serie)	1983	1990	989,324 (1983–1995)
	Alfa Romeo	Arna (only mechanics)	1983	1987	53,344
	Alfa Romeo	33 Sportwagon (first serie)	1984	1990	
	Fiat	Fiat Tipo	1989	1990	
	Autobianchi	Autobianchi Y10	1987	1995	
	Alfa Romeo	33 (second serie)	1990	1994	
	Alfa Romeo	33 Sportwagon (second serie)	1990	1994	
	Alfa Romeo	155	1992	1997	191,949
	Alfa Romeo	145	1994	2000	221,037
	Alfa Romeo	146	1995	2000	233,295
	Alfa Romeo	156 (first serie)	1997	2003	331,877
	Alfa Romeo	156 Sportwagon (first serie)	2000	2003	36,220
	Alfa Romeo	147 (first serie)	2000	2004	580,000 (both series)
	Alfa Romeo	156 (second serie)	2003	2005	312,000 (incl. SW)
	Alfa Romeo	156 Sportwagon (second serie)	2003	2005	
	Alfa Romeo	GT	2003	2010	80,832
	Alfa Romeo	147 (second serie)	2004	2010	
	Alfa Romeo	159	2005	2011	240,000 (incl. SW)
	Alfa Romeo	159 Sportwagon	2006	2011	
	Dodge	Hornet	2022	2026	

== Current cars produced ==
Image	Brand	Model	Production start	Production number
	Fiat	Panda	2011	
	Alfa Romeo	Tonale	2022	
	Citroën	2CV	Upcoming	
	Fiat	Koala	Upcoming	
