= Citroën 2CV (2028) =

Battery electric city car

- Citroën 2CV Concept at the 2026 Paris Motor Show

Overview
- Manufacturer: Citroën
- Production: 2028 (to commence)
- Assembly: Italy: Pomigliano d'Arco (Stellantis Pomigliano Plant)
- Designer: Antoine Gaillot-Drevon

Body and chassis
- Class: City car (A-segment)
- Body style: 5-door hatchback
- Related: Fiat Koala

Chronology
- Predecessor: Citroën C1; Citroën 2CV (spiritual)

The Citroën 2CV is an upcoming battery electric city car developed by Citroën and scheduled to enter production in 2028. It was revealed after a 36-year hiatus of the nameplate in 2026.

It is a modern reinterpretation of the original Citroën 2CV (1948–1990), which was powered by an air-cooled two cylinder engine. It was introduced as a concept car on 12 October 2026 in the 2026 Paris Motor Show.

== Overview ==
The revived 2CV forms part of Stellantis' broader plan to introduce 110 new vehicle models by 2030. It is also included in the company's "E-Car" initiative, which focuses on developing low-cost electric vehicles for the European market in partnership with Leapmotor, to be made at Stellantis' Pomgliano plant. According to Citroën, the new model is intended to embody the key characteristics that defined the original 2CV, including affordability, lightweight construction, versatility, and a distinctive design.

Ahead of the model’s unveiling, Citroën released teaser images in May 2026 that point to a design influenced by the historic 2CV, featuring a silhouette with retro-inspired elements.

=== 2CV Concept (2026) ===
The 2CV marketing campaign was inspired by a French board game, where five challenges were launched on Instagram in the lead-up to the concept car’s unveiling.

The 2CV concept is approximately 3.76 m (148 in) long, making it smaller than the original model and positioning it as an A-segment city car in the Citroën range between the Citroen Ami quadricycle and the larger e-C3.

Its exterior design is heavily inspired by the original model, with a significant amount of retro references. Key elements include the ridged bonnet, flattened front and rear windshields, exposed bumpers and wipers, and a roll-back fabric roof. It uses 18-inch wheels with plastic covers, with Michelin-developed tyres specifically for the E-regulation class in Europe.

Its interior is heavily reduced with minimal clutter. It has two displays – a small instrument panel projected onto a black bar at the bottom of the windscreen, and a small 8.0-inch e-ink central display. It uses a single-spoke steering wheel and yellow tartan fabric upholstery, with additional elements such as hanging lanterns and a wicker bin below the front seats, and egg holders in the door pockets.

The sound of its horn and the sound that plays while driving have been designed to resemble those of the original model.

Rear view

Interior

2CV Fourgonnette Concept

Rear view (Fourgonnette)
