= Alfa Romeo 145 and 146 =

Small family cars produced by Alfa Romeo

Alfa Romeo 145; Alfa Romeo 146
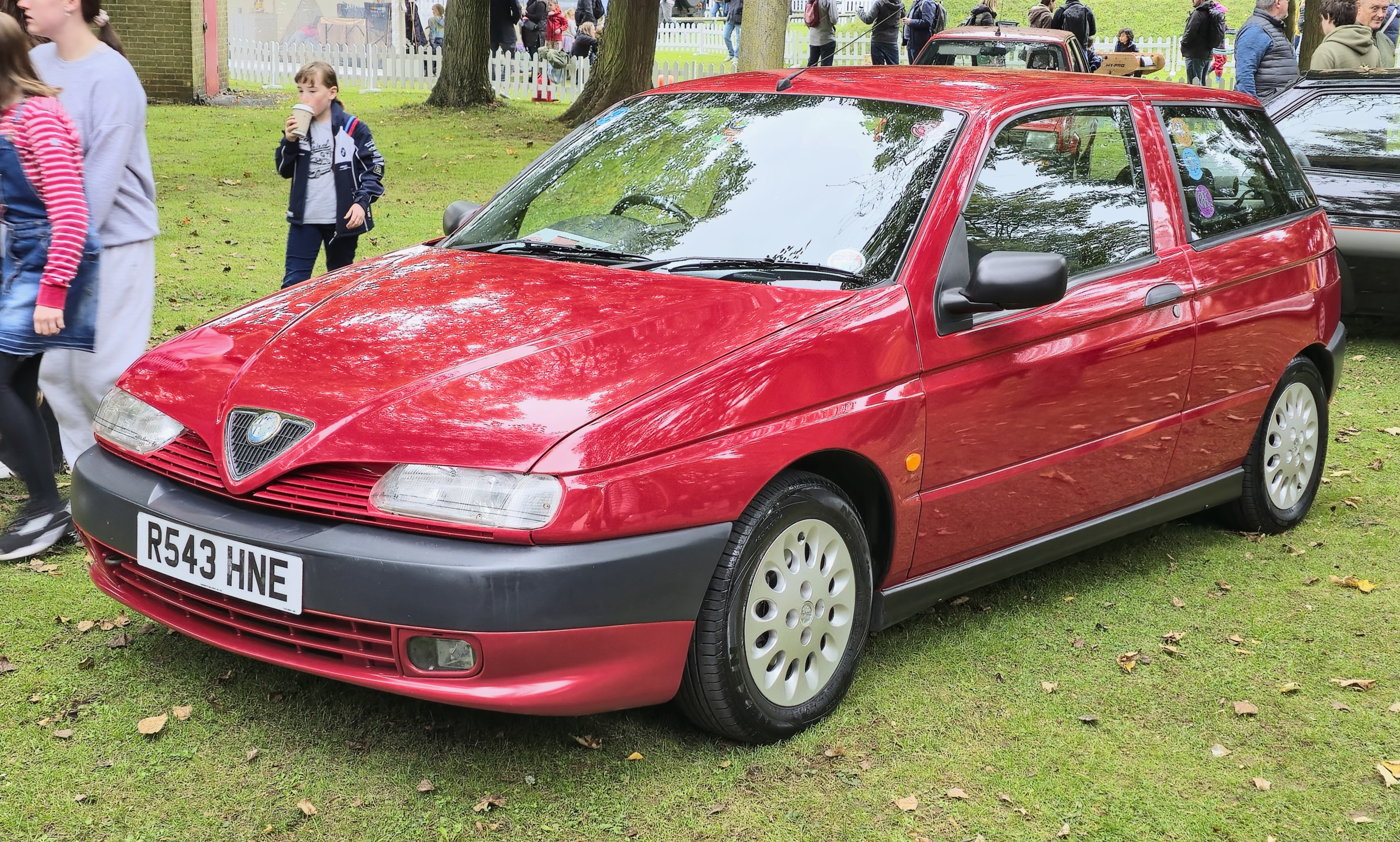
- Alfa Romeo 145 (pre-facelift)

Overview
- Manufacturer: Alfa Romeo
- Production: 1994–2000 (145); 1995–2000 (146)
- Assembly: Italy: Pomigliano d'Arco plant, Campania
- Designer: Chris Bangle at Centro Stile Fiat (145); Centro Stile Alfa Romeo under Walter de Silva (146)

Body and chassis
- Class: Small family car (C)
- Body style: 3-door hatchback (145); 5-door hatchback (146)
- Layout: Longitudinal front-engine, front-wheel-drive (Boxer); Transverse front-engine, front-wheel-drive (Twin Spark)
- Platform: Type Two (Tipo Due)
- Related: Fiat Tipo (160); Lancia Delta; Alfa Romeo Sportut

Powertrain
- Engine: Petrol: 1.4 L Boxer Flat-4; 1.6 L Boxer Flat-4; 1.7 L Boxer Flat-4; 1.4 L Twin Spark I4; 1.6 L Twin Spark I4; 1.8 L Twin Spark I4; 2.0 L Twin Spark I4; Diesel: 1.9 L turbo-diesel I4; 1.9 L JTD turbo-diesel I4
- Transmission: 5-speed manual

Dimensions
- Wheelbase: 2,540 mm (100.0 in)
- Length: 145; 1994–1999: 4,093 mm (161.1 in); 1999–2001: 4,061 mm (159.9 in); 146; 1995–1999: 4,257 mm (167.6 in); 1999–2001: 4,235 mm (166.7 in)
- Width: 1,712 mm (67.4 in)
- Height: 1,426 mm (56.1 in)
- Kerb weight: 1,140–1,275 kg (2,513–2,811 lb)

Chronology
- Predecessor: Alfa Romeo 33
- Successor: Alfa Romeo 147

The Alfa Romeo 145 (Type 930A) and the Alfa Romeo 146 (Type 930B) are small family cars produced by Italian automobile manufacturer Alfa Romeo between 1994 and 2000. The 145 is a three-door hatchback and was launched at the 1994 Turin Motor Show, while the 146 is a five-door hatchback, launched in 1995 to replace the Alfa Romeo 33.

The 145 and 146 share exterior and interior components from the B-pillar forwards. A total of 221,037 145s and 233,295 146s were built.

== History ==
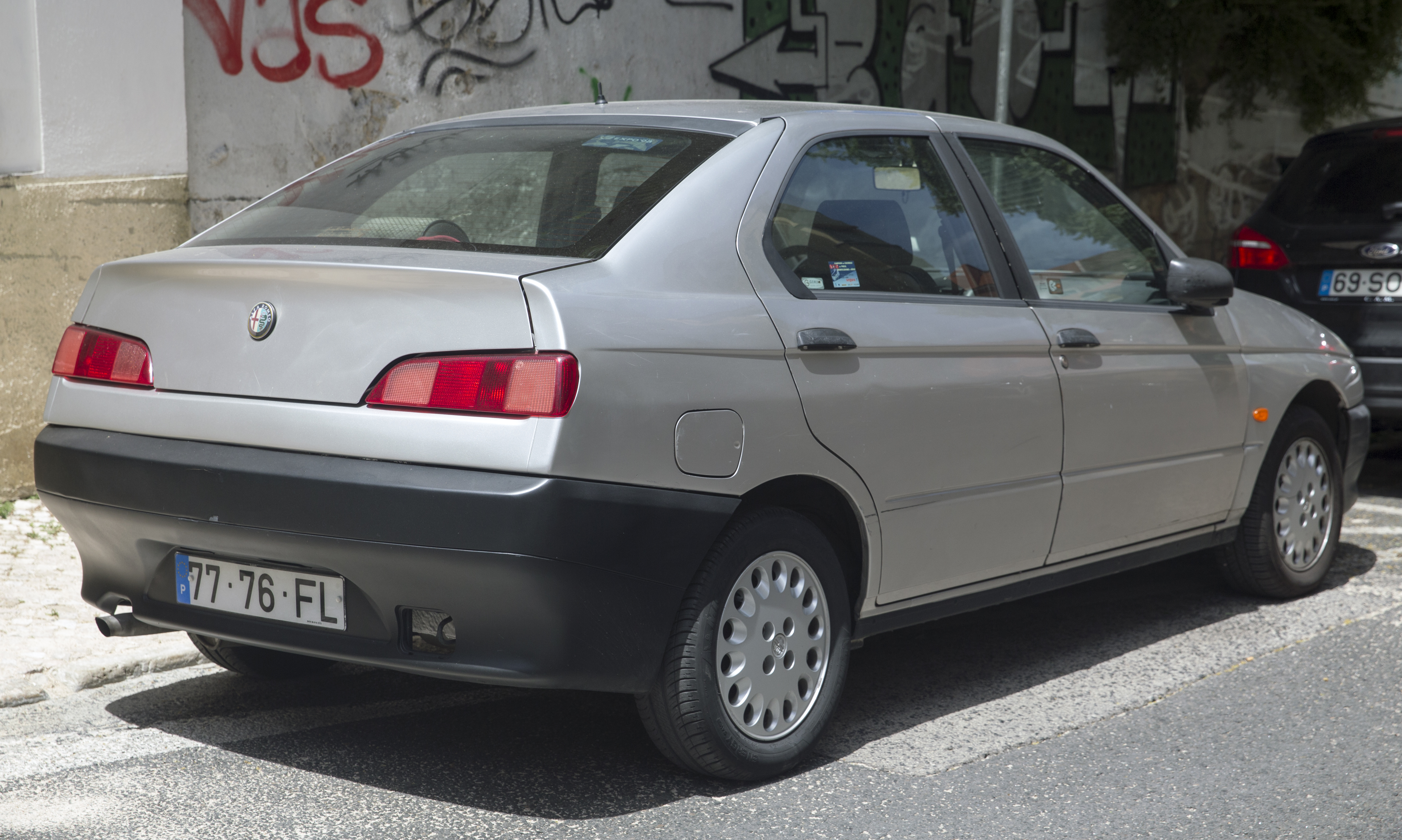
Alfa Romeo 146

Development of Tipo 930, the replacement for the ageing 33 in the competitive family hatchback market, lasted four years. The first offspring of the project, the three door 145, made its début on static display at the April 1994 Turin Motor Show and then at the Paris Motor Show in July; a simultaneous European commercial launch was planned for 9 September, but it was delayed until October.

In April 1992, work began on a second car, the 146 or Tipo 930B, derived from and to be sold alongside the 145; with its more traditional Alfa Romeo style, it was aimed at a different clientele, that of the outgoing 33. The 146 premiered in November 1994 at the Bologna Motor Show and went on sale in May 1995.

At launch, the engine line up for both cars comprised a 1.9 litre inline four turbo diesel and the boxer petrol engines from the 33, in 1.3 (Note: The same 1,351 cc engine was badged 1.4 on some markets, e.g. on the German one.) 8 valve, 1.6 8 valve and range topping 1.7 16 valve forms. Depending on the market, the engines were available in either or both base and better equipped L (for "Lusso") trim levels; L trim standard equipment was richer on larger engined cars.

=== Quadrifoglio and ti ===
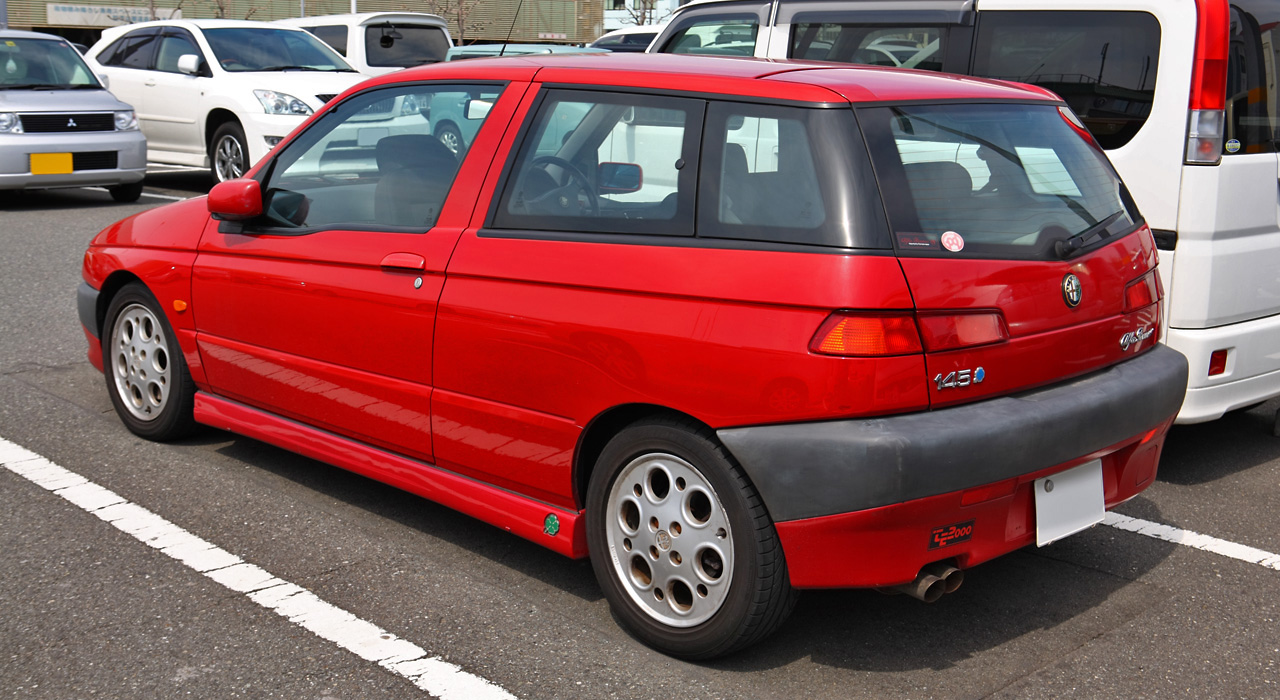
Alfa Romeo 145 Quadrifoglio (Rear view)

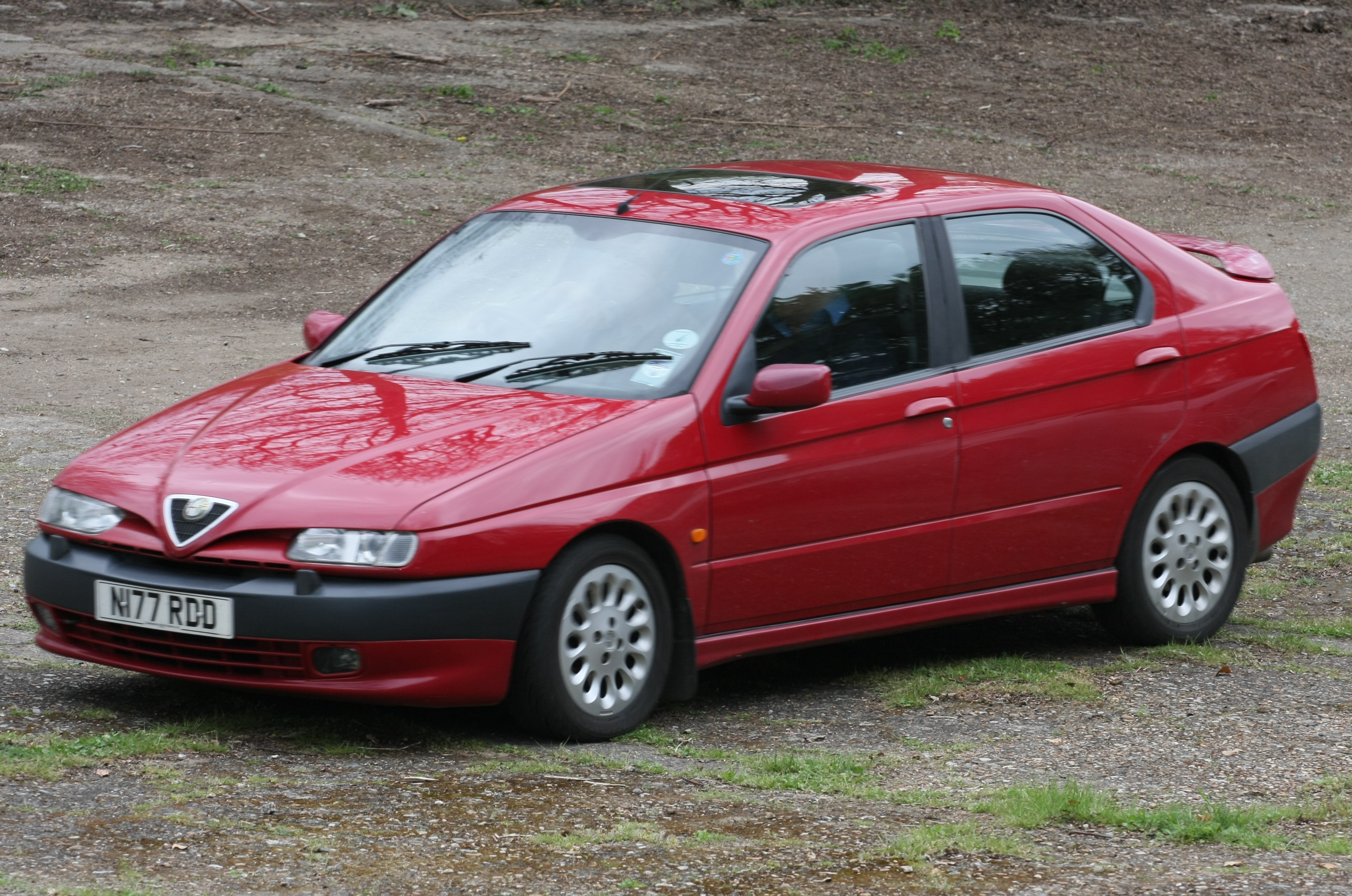
Alfa Romeo 146 ti

Flagship sport models with the two litre 16 valve Twin Spark inline four engine from the 155 arrived a year after the début: the 145 Quadrifoglio and 146 ti. Each of the two litre versions had a unique trim level; both included more standard equipment than the L trims, like ABS, leather wrapped steering wheel and shifter knob and Momo sport seats.

The 145 Quadrifoglio (145 Cloverleaf in the United Kingdom), launched at the September 1995 Frankfurt Motor Show and on sale from October, had deep body colour side skirts with "green cloverleaf" badges and five hole alloy wheels.

The 146 ti (Note: The acronym, standing for turismo internazionale–international touring, evoked the sport versions of the first Alfa Romeo Giulietta.) went on sale in February 1996. It came with painted side skirts, a boot spoiler and twelve hole alloy wheels. Two litre cars were equipped with stiffer suspension, uprated all disk braking system, ABS, wider, lower profile tyres and 'quick rack' direct steering (also seen on the 155, GTV and Spider) which improved responsiveness, but also compromised the turning circle.

=== First revisions ===
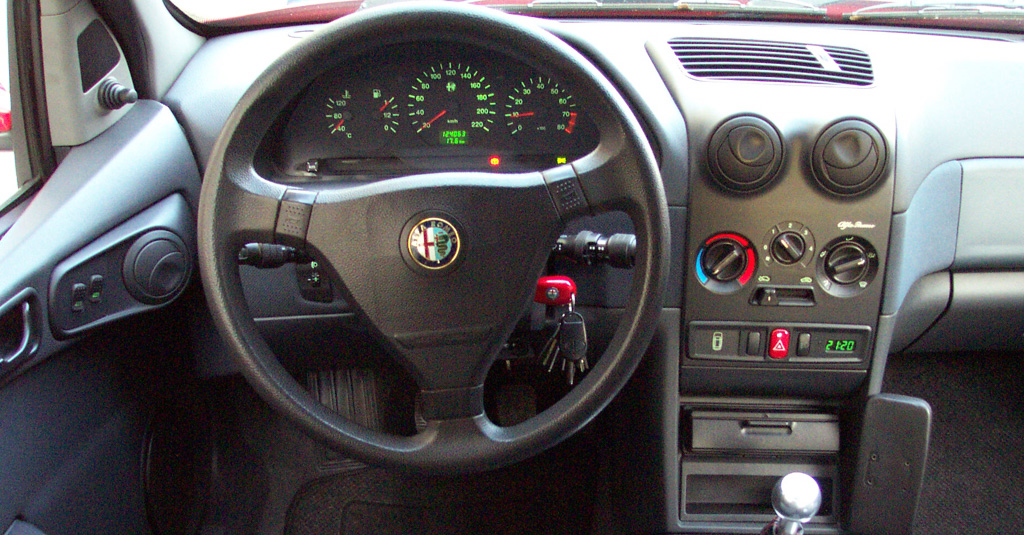
1996–1998 interior

From January 1997, all the boxers were phased out in favour of 1.4, 1.6 and 1.8 versions of the Twin Spark 16 valve engine. 1.8 litre cars adopted the sport chassis, steering, and brakes of the Quadrifoglio/ti, and also offered some of their optional equipment such as the sport seats. At the same time, the interior was updated: a new air conditioning system, a redesigned dashboard and an upholstered insert were fitted for left-hand drive cars. Right-hand drive cars retained the previous dashboard design. Outside changes were minor: new wheel covers and alloy wheels and a wider choice of paint colours.

In September 1997, Alfa Romeo introduced the Junior, a trim level targeted at young buyers that combined the sport styling and chassis setup of the range topping models, with the affordable entry level 1.4 powertrain, later the 1.6 engine was added to this trim as well. Based on the 1.4 L, Junior cars were distinguished by the Quadrifoglio's side skirts with "Junior" badges, specific 15-inch alloy wheels, and the stainless-steel exhaust tip (as well as, on the 146, the boot spoiler) from the ti.

By March 1998, 1.8 and 2.0 Twin Spark engines received the updates first introduced on the 156; due to variable length intake manifolds the two powertrains gained 4 to 5 PS and reached peak torque at engine speeds some 500 rpm lower.

=== 1999 restyling ===
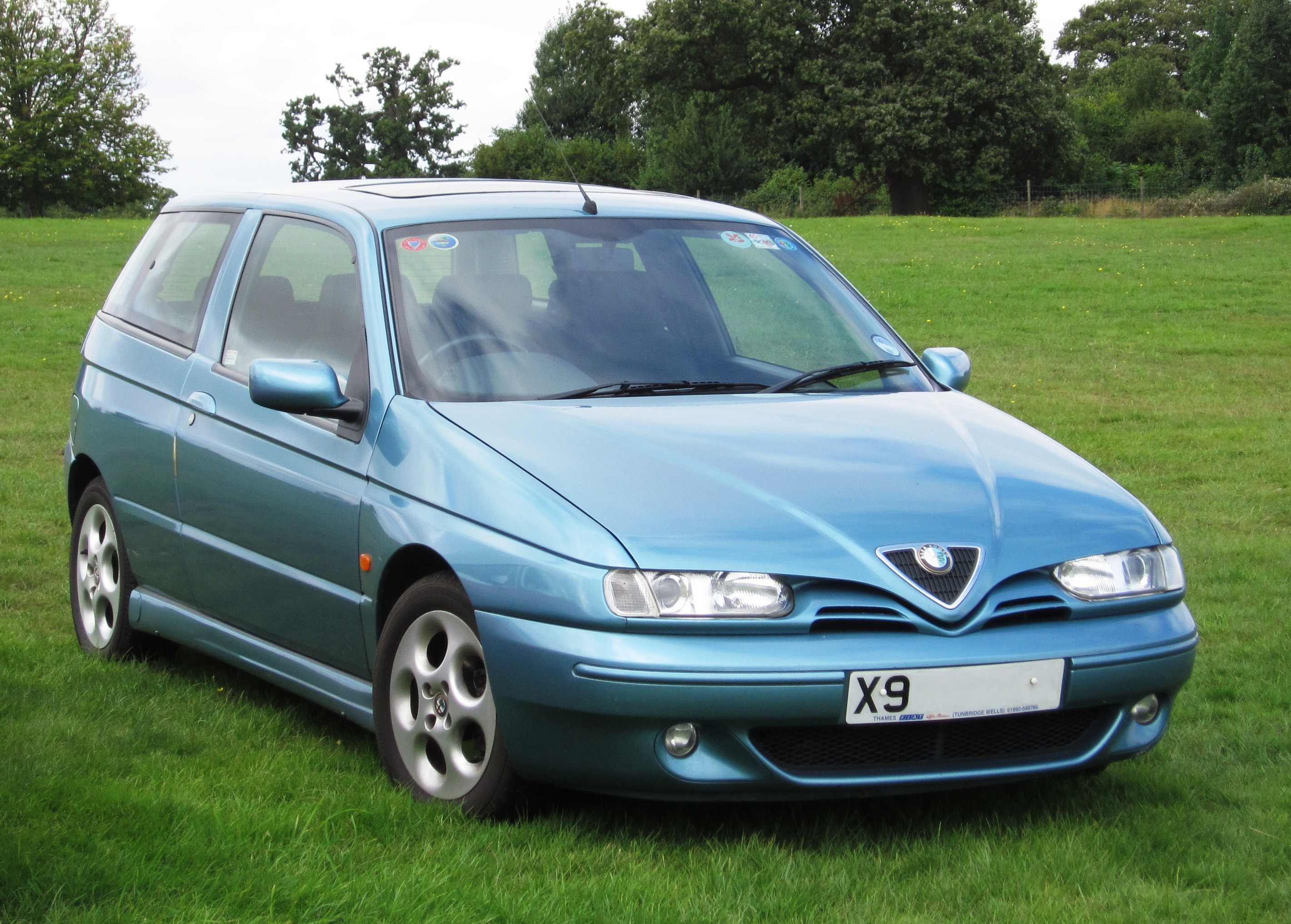
145 Pack Sport (post-facelift)

At the Geneva Motor Show in March 1999, Alfa Romeo introduced the restyled '99 line up for both models. The new common rail direct injection 1.9 turbo-diesel JTD engine replaced the 1.9 TD.

The main changes outside were new, body colour bumpers with round fog lights and narrow protection strips; the interior got new upholstery and detail trim changes such as chrome vent surrounds. Optional side airbags complemented the already available passenger and standard driver airbags.

The Junior trim level was discontinued, in favour of "pack sport" option package that included side skirts, rear spoiler, alloy wheels, leather wrapped steering wheel and sport seats, all standard features on the two litre models. A second "pack lusso" package offered leather steering wheel, velour upholstery and mahogany wood trim.

In September of the next year, at the Paris Motor Show the all-new 147 was officially launched. Eventually, in 2000, the 145 and 146 were superseded by the all-new 147, which was a far bigger commercial success, with its acclaimed front end styling and improved quality.

== Specifications ==
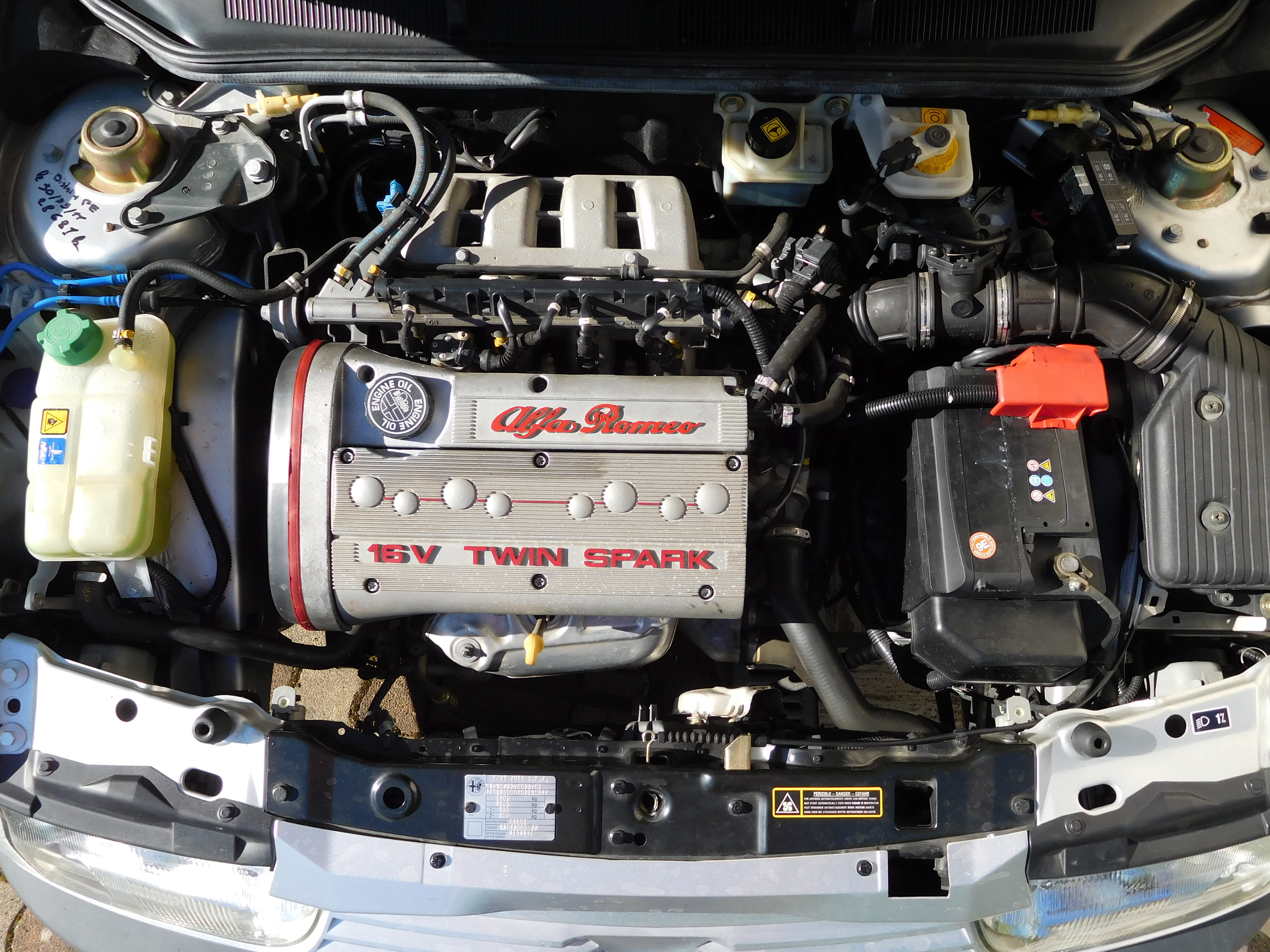
Twin Spark 1.6 engine

Based, as they were, on the Fiat Group's Tipo Due (Type Two) platform, the 145 and 146 had a unibody structure, front MacPherson strut and rear trailing arm suspension. A peculiarity of these cars is that they were designed to be fitted with both longitudinal engines (the older Boxers) and with transverse engines (the diesels and the Twin Spark).

The former were mounted in the same configuration as on the 33 or Alfasud, that is longitudinally overhanging the front axle with the gearbox towards the cabin; the latter in the conventional transverse position with the gearbox to the left side. All engines were coupled to a five speed manual transmissions. Steering was rack and pinion, with standard hydraulic power assistance.

=== Engines ===
Engine	Layout	Displacement Bore x stroke	Valvetrain	Fuel and intake systems	Peak power	Peak torque	Production period
Petrol engines
1.4*	H4	1,351 cc 80.0 x 67.2 mm	SOHC 8V	Weber-Marelli MPI	90 PS (66 kW; 89 hp) at 6,000 rpm	115 N⋅m (85 lb⋅ft) at 4,400 rpm	1994–1997
1.4 T.Spark 16V**	I4 TS	1,370 cc 82.0 x 64.9 mm	DOHC 16V, VVT	Motronic MPI	103 PS (76 kW; 102 hp) at 6,300 rpm	124 N⋅m (91 lb⋅ft) at 4,600 rpm	01/1997–2000
1.6	H4	1,596 cc 84.0 x 72.0 mm	SOHC 8V	Motronic or Rochester MPI	103 PS (76 kW; 102 hp) at 6,000 rpm	135 N⋅m (100 lb⋅ft) at 4,500 rpm	1994–1997
1.6 T.Spark 16V	I4 TS	1,598 cc 82.0 x 75.6 mm	DOHC 16V, VVT	Motronic MPI	120 PS (88 kW; 118 hp) at 6,300 rpm	144 N⋅m (106 lb⋅ft) at 4,500 rpm	01/1997–2000
1.7 16V	H4	1,712 cc 87.0 x 72.0 mm	DOHC 16V	Motronic MPI	129 PS (95 kW; 127 hp) at 6,500 rpm	149 N⋅m (110 lb⋅ft) at 4,300 rpm	1994–1997
1.8 T.Spark 16V	I4 TS	1,747 cc 82.0 x 82.7 mm	DOHC 16V, VVT	Motronic MPI	140 PS (103 kW; 138 hp) at 6,300 rpm	169 N⋅m (125 lb⋅ft) at 4,000 rpm	01/1997–03/1998
1.8 T.Spark 16V	I4 TS	1,747 cc 82.0 x 82.7 mm	DOHC 16V, VVT	Motronic MPI, VLIM	144 PS (106 kW; 142 hp) at 6,500 rpm	169 N⋅m (125 lb⋅ft) at 3,500 rpm	03/1998–2000
2.0 T.Spark 16V	I4 TS, 2 Balance shaft	1,970 cc 83.0 x 91.0 mm	DOHC 16V, VVT	Motronic MPI	150 PS (110 kW; 148 hp) at 6,200 rpm	187 N⋅m (138 lb⋅ft) at 4,000 rpm	10/1995–03/1998
2.0 T.Spark 16V	I4 TS, 2 Balance shaft	1,970 cc 83.0 x 91.0 mm	DOHC 16V, VVT	Motronic MPI, VLIM	155 PS (114 kW; 153 hp) at 6,400 rpm	187 N⋅m (138 lb⋅ft) at 3,500 rpm	03/1998–2000
Diesel engines
1.9 TD*	I4	1,929 cc 82.6 x 90.0 mm	SOHC 8V	Injection pump, turbo intercooler	90 PS (66 kW; 89 bhp) at 4,100 rpm	191 N⋅m (141 lb⋅ft) at 2,400 rpm	1994–1999
1.9 JTD	I4	1,910 cc 82.0 x 90.4 mm	SOHC 8V	Common rail DI, turbo intercooler	105 PS (77 kW; 104 hp) at 4,000 rpm	255 N⋅m (188 lb⋅ft) at 2,000 rpm	1999–2000
* Continental European markets only. ** Continental Europe and Ireland only.

=== Performance ===
Alfa Romeo 145
Model	1.4	1.4 TS 16V	1.6	1.6 TS 16V	1.7 16V	1.8 TS 16V		2.0 Quadrifoglio		1.9 TD	1.9 JTD
Model	1.4	1.4 TS 16V	1.6	1.6 TS 16V	1.7 16V	140 PS	144 PS	150 PS	155 PS	1.9 TD	1.9 JTD
Top speed km/h [mph]	178 [111]	185 [115]	185 [115]	195 [121]	200 [124]	205 [127]	207 [129]	210 [130]	211 [131]	178 [111]	185 [115]
Acceleration 0–100 km/h (0–62 mph)	12.5 s	11.2 s	11.0 s	10.2	9.8 s	9.2 s	9.1 s	8.4 s	8.3 s	12.0 s	10.4 s

Alfa Romeo 146
Model	1.4	1.4 TS 16V	1.6	1.6 TS 16V	1.7 16V	1.8 TS 16V		2.0 ti		1.9 TD	1.9 JTD
Model	1.4	1.4 TS 16V	1.6	1.6 TS 16V	1.7 16V	140 PS	144 PS	150 PS	155 PS	1.9 TD	1.9 JTD
Top speed km/h [mph]	179 [111]	187 [116]	187 [116]	197 [122]	201 [125]	207 [129]	209 [130]	215 [134]	216 [134]	179 [111]	187 [116]
Acceleration 0–100 km/h (0–62 mph)	12.8 s	11.5 s	11.5 s	10.5 s	10.2 s	9.4 s	9.3 s	8.5 s	8.4 s	12.5 s	10.5 s
