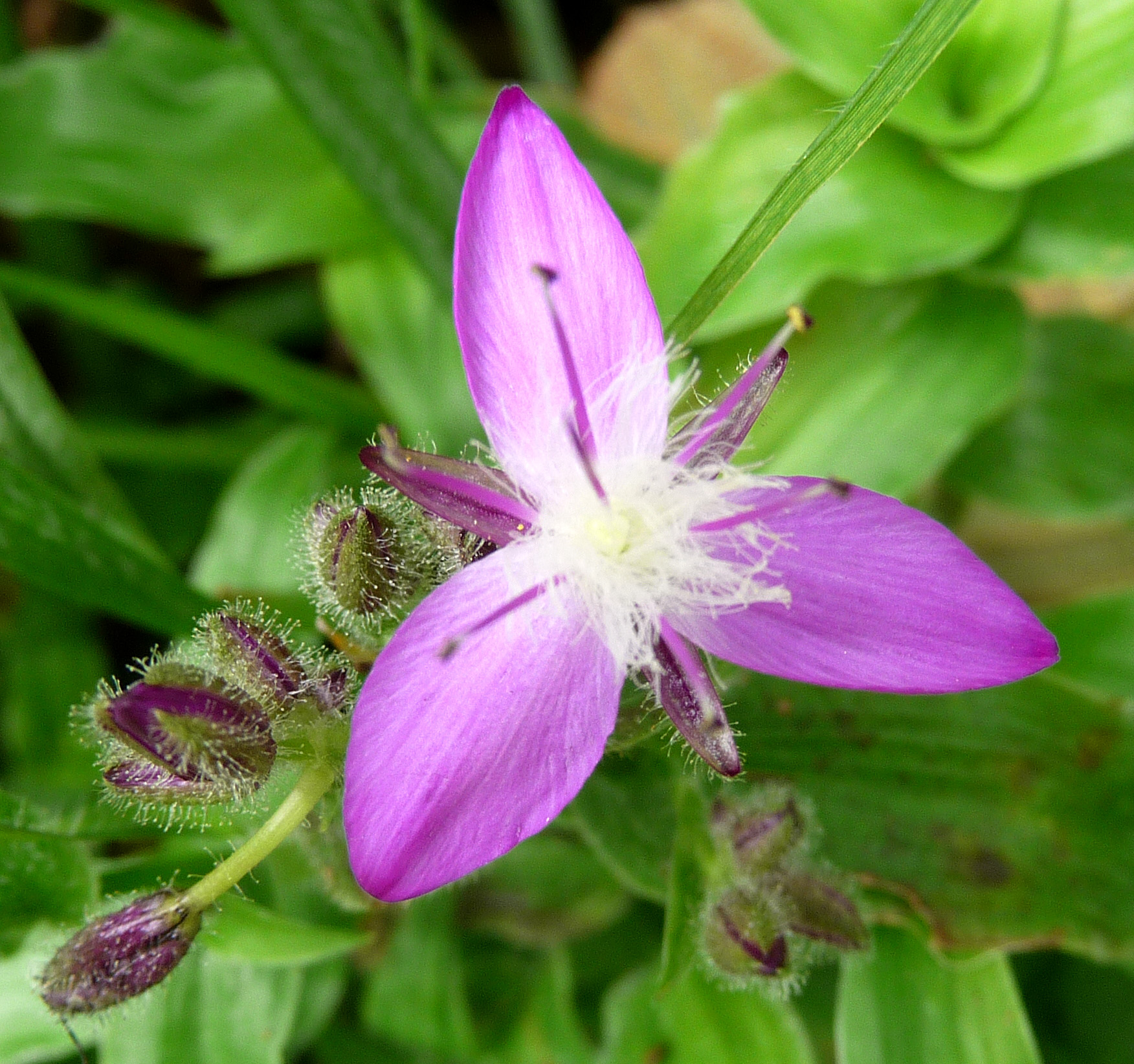

Scientific classification
- Kingdom: Plantae
- Clade: Tracheophytes
- Clade: Angiosperms
- Clade: Monocots
- Clade: Commelinids
- Order: Commelinales
- Family: Commelinaceae
- Subfamily: Commelinoideae
- Tribe: Tradescantieae
- Subtribe: Tradescantiinae
- Genus: Elasis
- Species: E. hirsuta

Binomial name
- Elasis hirsuta (Kunth) D.R.Hunt

Synonyms
- Tradescantia hirsuta Kunth

= Elasis hirsuta =

Genus of flowering plants

Elasis hirsuta is a species of monocotyledonous flowering plant in the dayflower family. It is a subshrub endemic to Ecuador.
