= Rudolf Hruska =

Austrian automobile designer and engineer

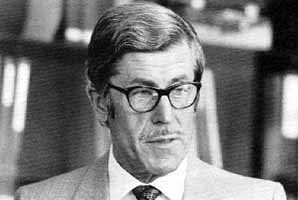
Rudolf Hruska

Rudolf Hruska (2 July 1915 – 4 December 1995) was an Austrian automobile designer and engineer. He was most famous for his design of various Alfa Romeo cars.

== Biography ==
Hruska was born on 2 July 1915 in Vienna. His family was originally from Bohemia. He lost his mother at the age of five. Rudolf was raised by his relatives as his father decided to start a new family.

After graduating Vienna University of Technology he worked for Magirus in Ulm (1935–1938) and Porsche in Stuttgart (1938–1945), developing the Kdf-Wagen (1939) and VK 4501 (P) tank (1943). In Meran he and Carlo Abarth established a Porsche dealership (1945), and shortly after joined Piero Dusio in the Turin-based Cisitalia racing car project (1946–1949). Hruska joined Finmeccanica (1951–1954), consulting on the Alfa Romeo 1900. At Alfa Romeo (1954–1959) he assisted Orazio Satta Puliga in the Alfa Romeo Giulietta, before joining Simca and Fiat (1960–1967), working on the Simca 1000 and Fiat 124/Fiat 128. Hruska then designed the Alfa Romeo Alfasud and established the new Alfa Romeo Pomigliano d'Arco plant near Naples (1967–1973). Since then he was in a design firm in Arese (1974–1980) and at I.DE.A Institute in Turin (1980-).

Hruska died on 4 December 1995 in Turin, at the age of 80.
