= Elasis =

Scientific classification
- Kingdom: Plantae
- Clade: Embryophytes
- Clade: Tracheophytes
- Clade: Spermatophytes
- Clade: Angiosperms
- Clade: Monocots
- Clade: Commelinids
- Order: Commelinales
- Family: Commelinaceae
- Subtribe: Tradescantiinae
- Genus: Elasis; D.R.Hunt

Species
- Elasis guatemalensis (C.B.Clarke) M.Pell.; Elasis hirsuta (Kunth) D.R.Hunt

Genus of flowering plants

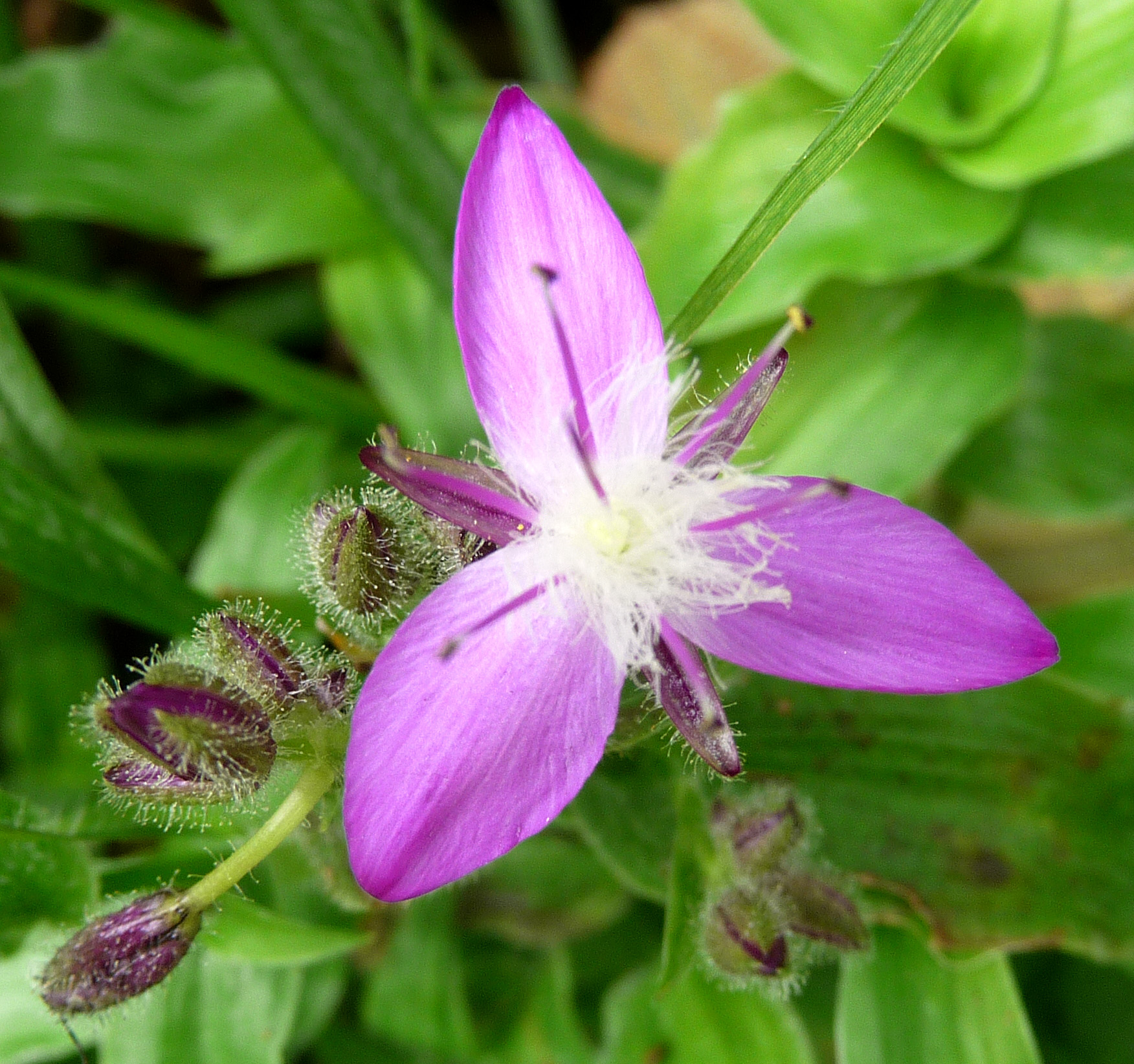
Elasis hirsuta

Elasis is a genus of flowering plants in the family Commelinaceae. It includes two species of subshrubs native to southern Mexico, Central America, and Ecuador.

- Elasis guatemalensis (C.B.Clarke) M.Pell. – southern Mexico to Nicaragua
- Elasis hirsuta (Kunth) D.R.Hunt – Ecuador
