= Pomigliano d'Arco =

- Comune
- Comune di Pomigliano d'Arco
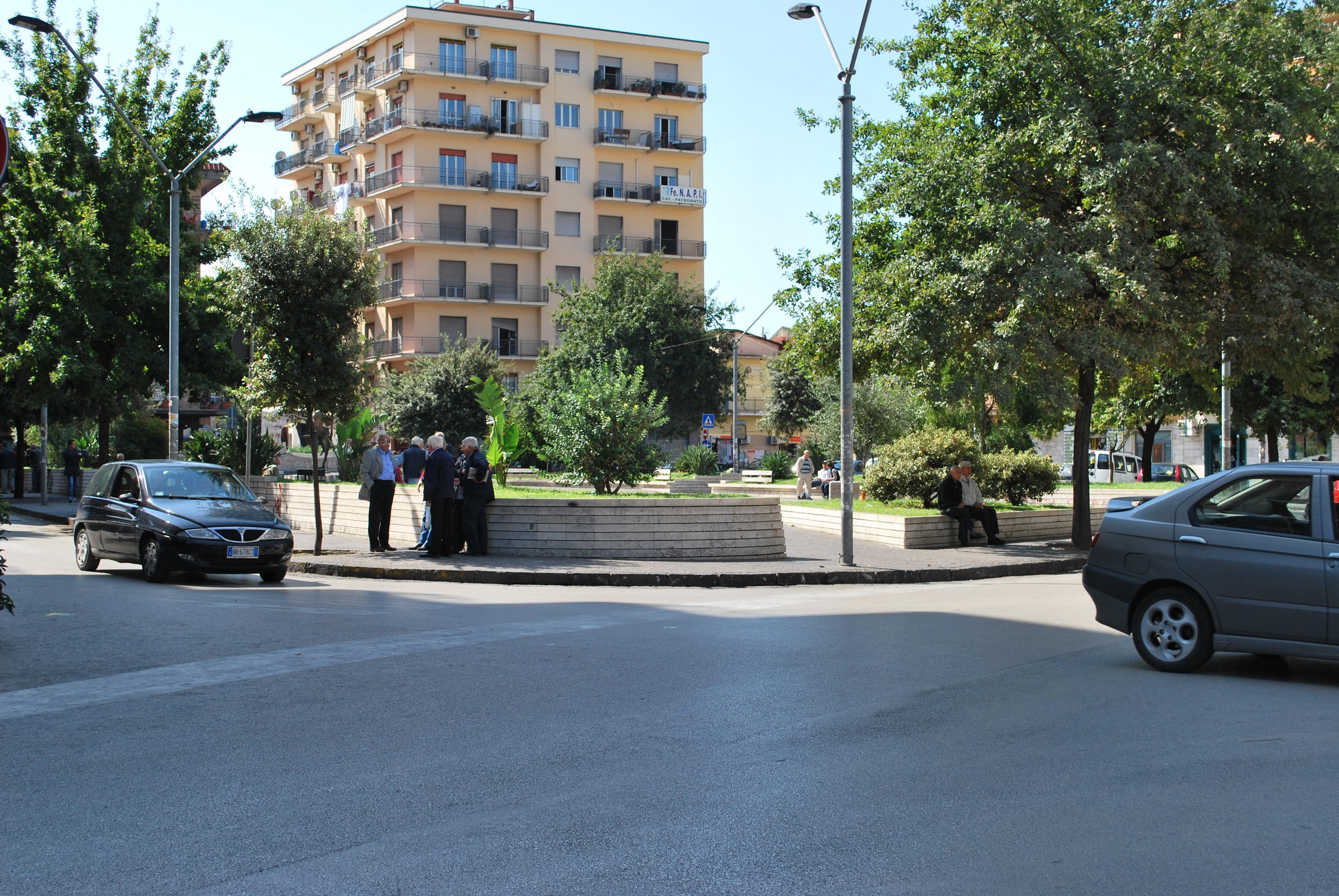
- Piazza Primavera

- Coat of arms

- Location within Italy Location within Campania
- Coordinates: 40°55′N 14°24′E
- Country: Italy
- Region: Campania
- Metropolitan city: Naples (NA)
- Frazioni: Castello, Cutinelli, Feudo, Papaccio, Masseria Guadagni, Masseria Tavolone, Pacciano, Pratola Ponte

Government
  - Mayor: Gianluca del Mastro

Area
  - Total: 11.44 km^{2} (4.42 sq mi)
- Elevation: 36 m (118 ft)

Population (30 November 2015)
  - Total: 39,922
  - Density: 3,490/km^{2} (9,038/sq mi)
- Demonym: Pomiglianesi
- Time zone: UTC+1 (CET)
  - Summer (DST): UTC+2 (CEST)
- Postal code: 80038
- Dialing code: 081
- Patron saint: Felix of Nola
- Saint day: 14 January
- Website: Official website

Pomigliano d'Arco is a municipality in the Metropolitan City of Naples in Italy, located north of Mount Vesuvius.

It is known for its industrial pole among the largest and most influential in southern Italy. In the industrial area there is, among others, the Gian Battista Vico factory of Fiat Chrysler Automobiles, the center Elasis (also Fiat), the Alenia Aermacchi and Avio plants, as well as having hosted the first airport of Campania in the 1960s.

== History ==
During World War II, Pomigliano was the location of a large military airfield and base, and was attacked on several occasions by the United States Army Air Forces. The airfield was later used by the RAF and the USAAF Twelfth Air Force during the Italian campaign and known as RAF Pomigliano and Pomigliano Airfield.
