= Alfa Romeo Boxer engine =

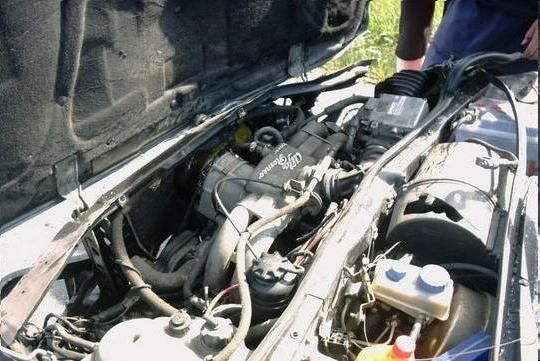

Overview
- Manufacturer: Alfasud (Alfa Romeo) (1971–1986); Alfa-Lancia Industriale (1987–1991); Fiat Auto (1991–1997)
- Production: 1971–1997

Layout
- Configuration: Naturally aspirated Flat-4
- Displacement: 1.2 L (1,186 cc); 1.3 L (1,286 cc); 1.4 L (1,351 cc); 1.5 L (1,490 cc); 1.6 L (1,596 cc); 1.7 L (1,712 cc)
- Cylinder bore: 80 mm (3.15 in); 84 mm (3.31 in); 87 mm (3.43 in)
- Piston stroke: 59 mm (2.32 in); 64 mm (2.52 in); 67.2 mm (2.65 in); 72 mm (2.83 in)
- Cylinder block material: Cast iron
- Cylinder head material: Aluminium alloy
- Valvetrain: SOHC or DOHC; 2 or 4-valve

Combustion
- Fuel system: 1 or 2 carburetors Fuel injection
- Management: Bosch LE 3.1 Jetronic or Motronic ML 4.1
- Fuel type: Petrol
- Oil system: 4–4.5 L (4.2–4.8 US qt; 3.5–4.0 imp qt)
- Cooling system: Water-cooled

Output
- Power output: 63–137 PS (46–101 kW)

Emissions
- Emissions control systems: Catalytic converter (on 1700 16V)

Chronology
- Successor: Twin Spark engine

The Alfa Romeo Boxer engine is a water-cooled flat-4 piston engine, developed by Alfa Romeo for front-wheel drive, and longitudinal applications. It debuted on the Alfasud, which was introduced in 1971 at the Turin Motor Show. In the following decades the Boxer went through several upgrades and powered many Alfa Romeo front-wheel drive cars up to 1996 (not the 164). In 1997 it was phased out and replaced by the transversely-mounted Twin Spark engines.

== Description ==
This liquid-cooled, four cylinder, boxer (horizontally opposed) engine had a belt-driven water pump. Its integrated cast iron cylinder block and crankcase had three main bearings. The two aluminum alloy crossflow cylinder heads had one or two overhead camshaft in each, driven by individual timing belts, and two valves per cylinder (four valves per cylinder in the 1700 16V version). Wet sump lubrication.

The fuel delivery system depended on version: a single-barrel downdraft carburetor; one or two double-barrel downdraft carburetors; Bosch LE 3.1 Jetronic fuel injection (8 valve engines).; or Bosch Motronic ML 4.1 fuel injection (16 valve engines).

== 1200 ==
The original engine displaced 1.2 L (1,186 cc; 72.37 cu in) with an 80 mm × 59 mm (3.15 in × 2.32 in) bore and stroke; it produces between 63 and 77 PS (46 and 57 kW).

Applications:

- 1971–1983 Alfa Romeo Alfasud
- 1984–1986 Alfa Romeo Arna
- 1984–1986 Nissan Cherry Europe (rebadged Alfa Romeo Arna)
- 1983–1986 Alfa Romeo 33 (late versions, export only)

== 1300 ==
The engine was stroked up to 64 mm (2.52 in) to create the 1.3 L (1,286 cc) version. This engine produced 68–75 PS (50–55 kW). A version of this engine (engine type 901.U0) was fitted with a catalytic converter, air injection, and evaporative emissions controls and received Californian emissions certification in 1976. The Alfasud was nonetheless never exported to the United States.

Applications:

- 1977–1983 Alfa Romeo Alfasud
- 1977–1983 Alfa Romeo Sprint

== 1400 ==
The 1.4 L (1,351 cc) was usually labelled a "1.3" in spite of its displacement. It produced 75–86 PS (55–63 kW) with one or two double-barrel carburettors. It retained the 80 mm (3.15 in) bore but used the 1500s 67.2 mm (2.65 in) crankshaft.

Applications:

- 1978–1983 Alfa Romeo Alfasud
- 1978–1989 Alfa Romeo Sprint
- 1983–1995 Alfa Romeo 33
- 1994–1997 Alfa Romeo 145
- 1995–1997 Alfa Romeo 146

== 1500 ==
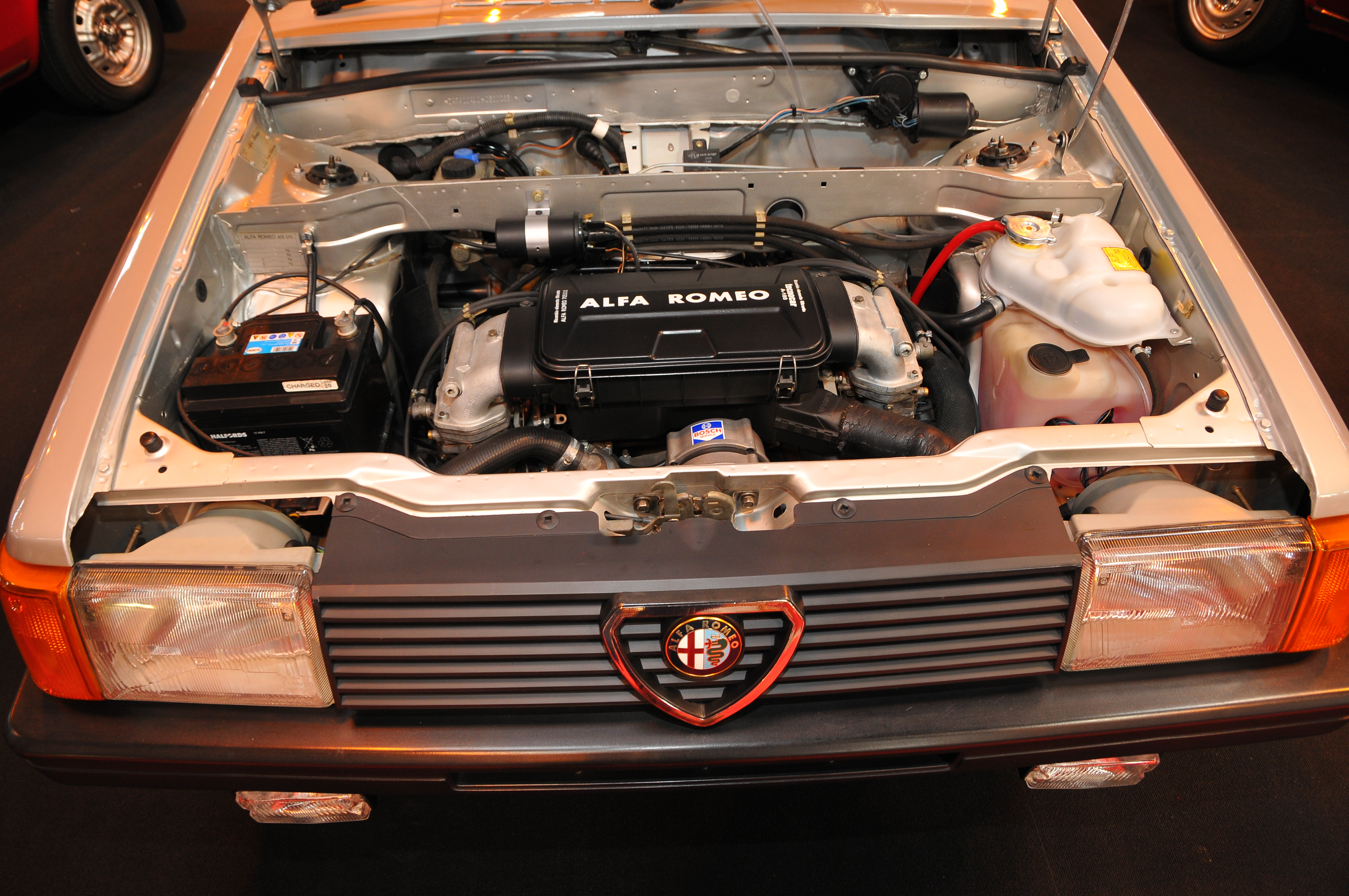
Engine of Alfa Romeo Arna 1.5 Ti.

From 1978 until October 1986, the largest member of the family was the 1.5 L (1,490 cc) "1500" with 84 mm × 67.2 mm (3.31 in × 2.65 in) bore and stroke. It was built until 1995 and produced 84 to 105 PS (62 to 77 kW). This is the largest engine to have been installed in Alfasuds.

Applications:

- 1978–1983 Alfa Romeo Alfasud
- 1978–1989 Alfa Romeo Sprint
- 1984–1986 Alfa Romeo Arna
- 1983–1995 Alfa Romeo 33
- 1985–1986 Clan Clover
- 1984–1986 Nissan Cherry Europe

== 1600 ==
The 1.6 L (1,596 cc) produced 103 PS (76 kW). Bore and stroke is 84 mm × 72 mm (3.31 in × 2.83 in).

Applications:

- 1994–1997 Alfa Romeo 145
- 1995–1997 Alfa Romeo 146

== 1700 ==
In October 1986 the engine was increased in size to 1.7 L (1,712 cc) (104 cu.in), it was used in the 33 and later Sprints, power was between 105 and 118 PS (77 and 87 kW). Bore and stroke is 87 mm × 72 mm (3.43 in × 2.83 in).

Applications:

- October 1986 – 1995 Alfa Romeo 33
- October 1986 – 1989 Alfa Romeo Sprint

== 1700 16V ==
In January 1990 a quad-cam 16-valve version of the venerable boxer was introduced; it was the most powerful to date, with 129–137 PS (95–101 kW) with or without catalytic converters. Only available in fuel-injected form, the 1.7 16V was equipped with the Bosch Motronic ML 4.1 system.

The last Alfa Romeo flat-four engine was produced in 1997, after a run of 26 years.

Applications:

- January 1990 – 1995 Alfa Romeo 33 (2nd generation)
- 1994–1997 Alfa Romeo 145
- 1995–1997 Alfa Romeo 146
