= Alfa Romeo Arna =

Italian hatchback from the 1980s

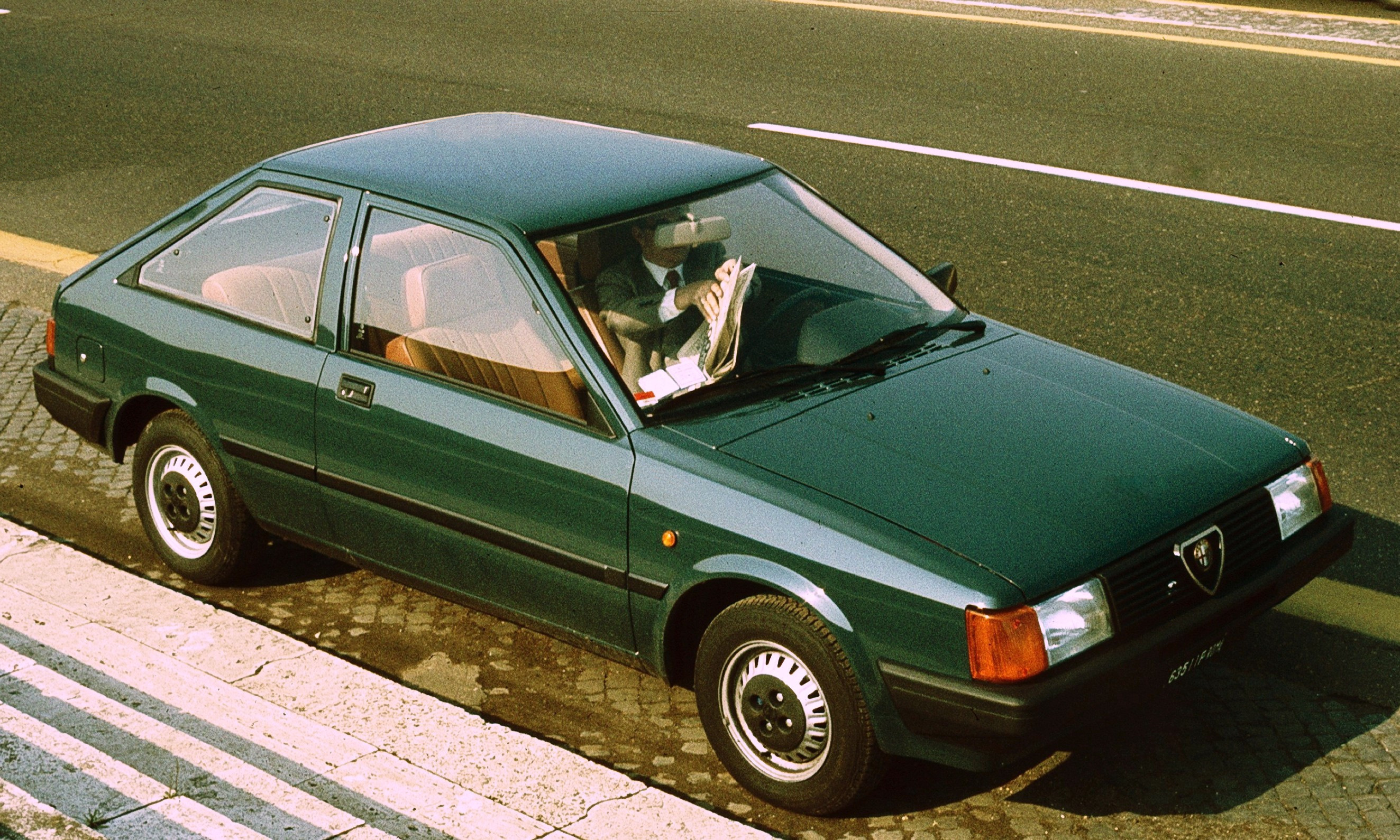
- Alfa Romeo Arna three door

Overview
- Manufacturer: Alfa Romeo Nissan Autoveicoli S.p.A.
- Production: 1983–1987; 53,047 produced
- Assembly: Italy: Pratola Serra

Body and chassis
- Class: Small family car (C)
- Body style: 3-door hatchback 5-door hatchback
- Layout: Longitudinal front-engine, front-wheel drive
- Related: Nissan Cherry Europe; Nissan Pulsar Milano; Holden Astra

Powertrain
- Engine: 1.2 L Boxer H4; 1.3 L Boxer H4; 1.5 L Boxer H4
- Transmission: 5 speed manual

Dimensions
- Wheelbase: 2,416 mm (95.1 in)
- Length: 4,000 mm (157.5 in)
- Width: 1,621 mm (63.8 in)
- Height: 1,340 mm (52.8 in)
- Curb weight: 850 kg (1,874 lb)

Chronology
- Predecessor: Alfa Romeo Alfasud
- Successor: Alfa Romeo 33

The Alfa Romeo Arna (an acronym for "Alfa Romeo Nissan Autoveicoli", meaning "Alfa Romeo[-]Nissan motor vehicles", but also a female Italian name) (Type 920) is a hatchback produced by the Italian manufacturer Alfa Romeo Nissan Autoveicoli S.p.A. between 1983 and 1987. The company was founded on 9 October 1980, as a 50:50 joint venture between the Italian Alfa Romeo S.p.A. and the Japanese Nissan Motor Company.

== History ==
On 9 October 1980, Takashi Ishihara of Nissan and Alfa Romeo President Ettore Massacesi signed a memorandum in Tokyo for increased cooperation between their two firms, and revealed their intent to create a joint production venture called AR.N.A. S.p.A. (Alfa Romeo Nissan Autoveicoli). Italian Prime Minister Francesco Cossiga endorsed the deal, despite political and auto industry opposition, because he hoped to bolster the fortunes of the state owned manufacturer, which had a cult following but was losing money.

The immediate priority of Alfa management, including Massacesi and managing director Corrado Innocenti was to field a competitor in the increasingly lucrative family hatchback market sector where the compact Volkswagen Golf and Lancia Delta were proving successful, and they hoped an alliance with Nissan would bring a competitive model to market faster and more cheaply.

During that period, European countries were engaging in protectionism to guard their domestic car industries, with France even banning the import of Japanese made vehicles. Working with Alfa Romeo, who controlled a respectable amount of European auto sales at the time was seen as a good hedge for Nissan and a chance to establish a foothold in the European market.

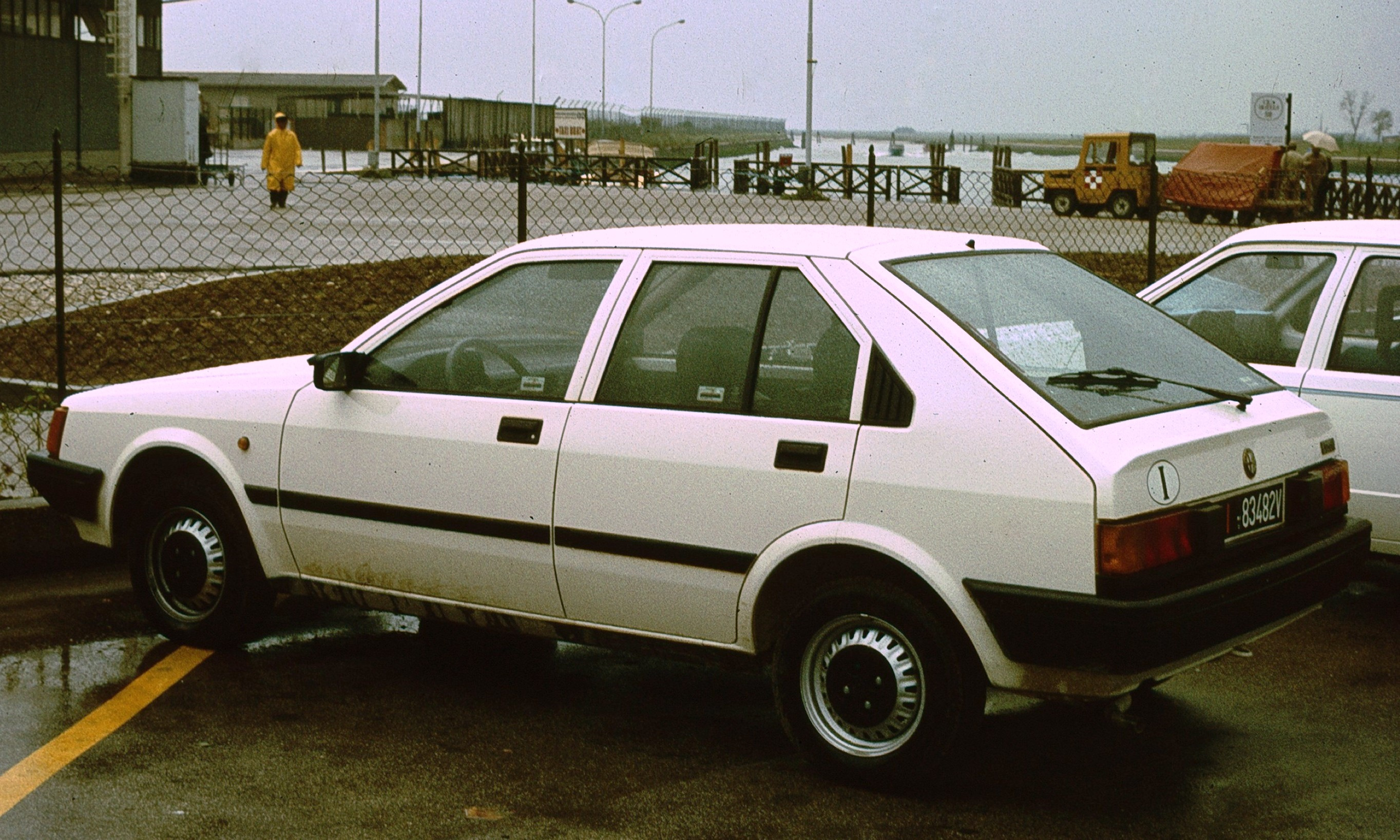
Alfa Romeo Arna five door

For the joint venture, a new plant was constructed in Pratola Serra, near Naples. The body panels of the car were constructed in Japan by Nissan, then shipped to Italy for final assembly.

The product of the relationship was launched at the 1983 Frankfurt Motor Show; the car's name was an acronym meaning Alfa Romeo Nissan Autoveicoli. The Arna was largely based on the N12 series Nissan Pulsar / Nissan Cherry but featured Alfa Romeo engines carried over from the Alfasud, as well as an Alfa transmission, steering, front brakes and front suspension.

It did however use an independent rear suspension and rear brakes from Nissan. The Arna was also briefly marketed as the Nissan Cherry Europe in the United Kingdom and Spain. Italian built cars badged as Nissan Cherry Europe can be readily identified by their rear lighting clusters, which match those of the Arna rather than the Japanese built Cherry.

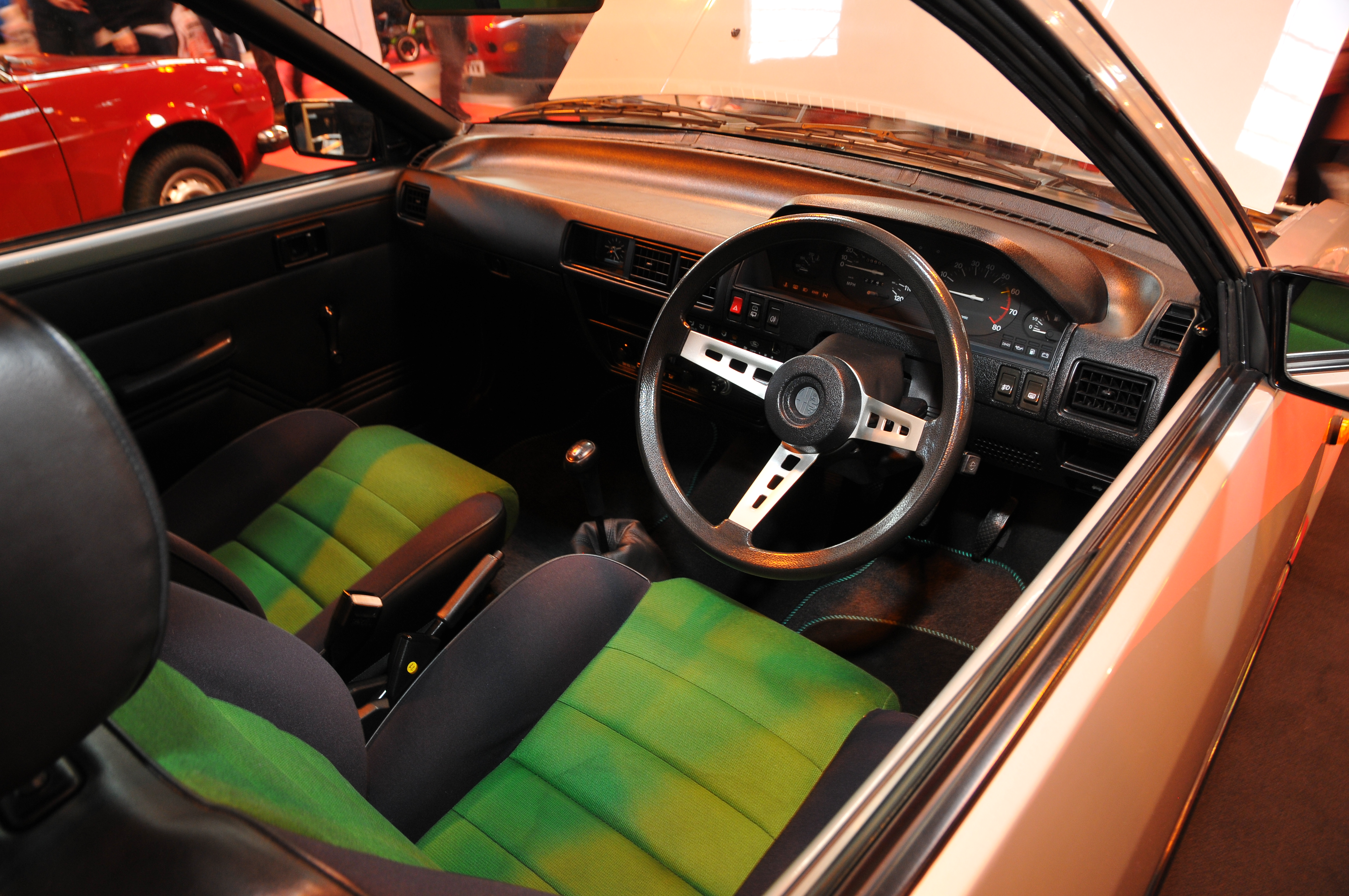
Alfa Romeo Arna Ti Interior

Although no variants of the Italian built Arna were ever sold in Japan, a domestic version of the N12 Nissan Pulsar, labelled the Nissan Pulsar Milano X1, made use of the Alfa Romeo connection in its publicity and was fitted with the same black and green interior as the Arna Ti or Cherry Europe GTi. The model was Nissan through and through, featuring the usual, transversely mounted Nissan E engine.

While British Leyland and Honda had a limited partnership in the United Kingdom at that time, the Nissan and Alfa Romeo alliance was the first of its kind between a European and Japanese automaker with joint investment in manufacturing and development. It was feared by the European Economic Community and ironically, Alfa's future parent Fiat, that the success of this partnership would create a Trojan horse, enabling Japanese automakers to compete "unfairly" in Europe, and thereby take sales away from other European auto-makers.

However, such fears were quickly allayed upon the Arna's release when it became obvious that the Arna exhibited the worst qualities of each of its parents. The Arna featured tempestuous mechanicals, rust prone bodywork and indifferent build quality courtesy of Alfa Romeo, married to a Nissan body of questionable build and frumpy, box like styling, with insipid handling common to Japanese cars of the time.

This mismatch of technical strengths served to kill the sales of the Arna very rapidly. As the car gained a reputation for poor build quality and questionable reliability, sales of the Nissan badged Cherry Europe sister car also nosedived, as loyal Nissan customers shunned it in favour of the "genuine" Japanese built Cherry instead.

By 1986, Alfa Romeo's parent company, the Italian government owned Istituto per la Ricostruzione Industriale was suffering from heavy losses, and IRI president Romano Prodi put Alfa Romeo up for sale, with Fiat ultimately emerging as the new owner of Alfa. Fiat's first decision was to cease Arna production owing to its poor reputation and poor sales, and to terminate the unsuccessful Alfa Romeo Nissan alliance. Production ceased in 1987, with Fiat intending to strengthen the competitiveness of the Alfa Romeo 33 as Alfa's entry in that segment. By this time, Nissan had set up a European operation of its own at Nissan Motor Manufacturing UK in Sunderland, which became hugely successful.

== Models ==
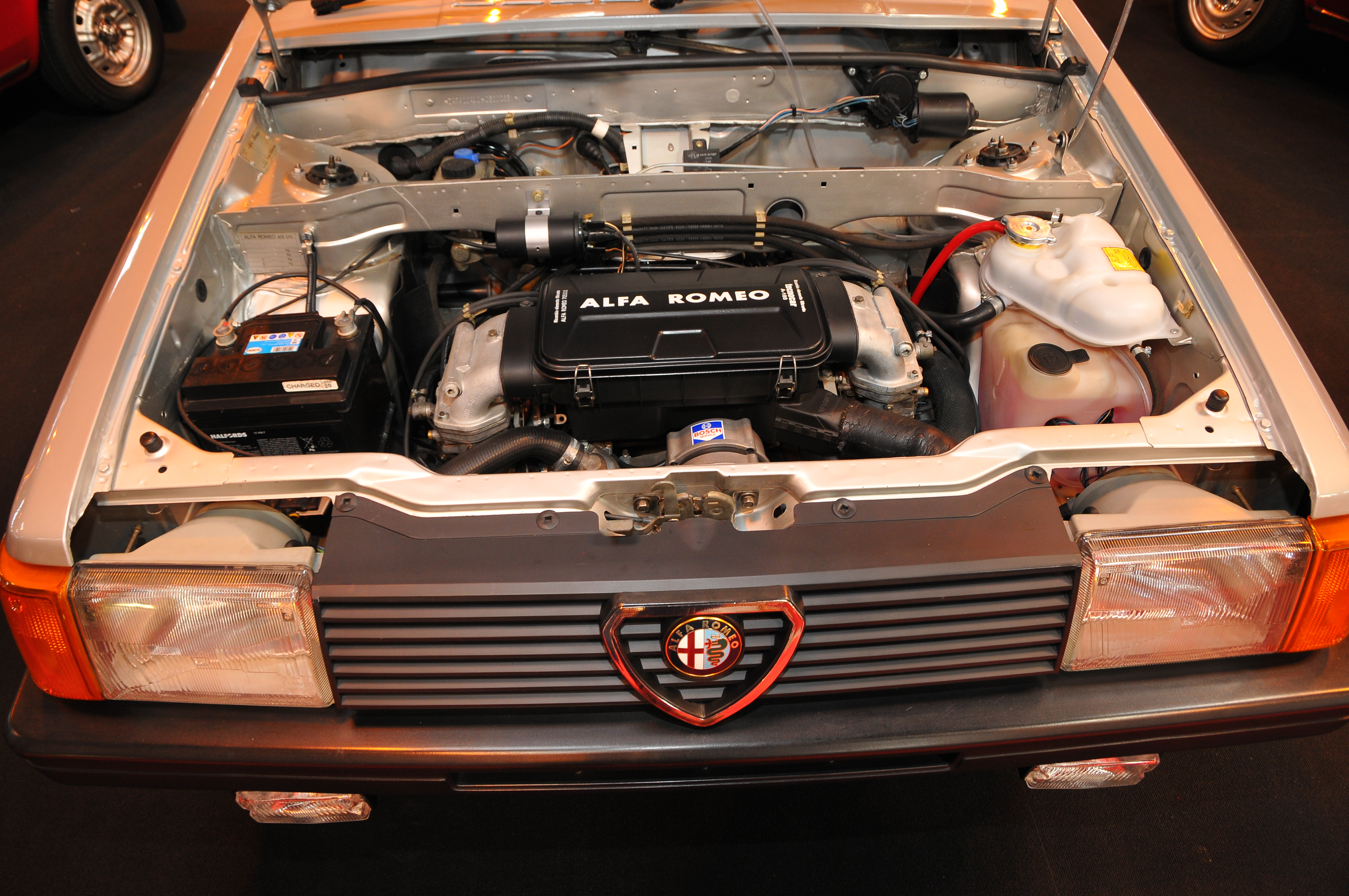
Engine of Alfa Romeo Arna 1.5 Ti.

The Arna was initially sold as a three-door L and a five-door SL, and was fitted with the Alfasud 1.2 boxer engine (63 PS). In 1984, a three-door TI version, with an 86 PS (63 kW; 85 hp) 1.3-litre boxer four engine, was introduced, which was capable of reaching a top speed of 170 km/h (106 mph). In November 1984 (model year 1985) came a more powerful 1.2 engine in the same trim configurations with 68 PS (50 kW; 67 hp), while there were no external differences there were light alterations to the interior.

Later, there were also some TI trim cars built with 1.5-litre engines, sold also as the Nissan Cherry Europe GTI. The more powerful 1.5 TI/Cherry GTI had a top speed of 175 km/h (109 mph). The TI version was discontinued halfway through 1986.

== Engines ==
Engine	Model	Engine code	Displacement (cc)	Configuration	Max power PS (kW)	Max torque	Top speed	Acceleration 0 to 100 km/h (0-62 mph) (s)	Availability
1,2	L/LS	AS 305	1 186	Flat-4	63 (46) at 6,000 rpm	88 N⋅m (65 lb⋅ft) at 2,000 rpm	155 km/h (96 mph)		1983–1984
1,2	L/LS	AS 305	1 186	Flat-4	68 (50) at 6,000 rpm	92 N⋅m (68 lb⋅ft) at 2,000 rpm	156 km/h (97 mph)	14,1	1984–1987
1,4	TI	AS 300006	1 351	Flat-4	71 (52) at 5,800 rpm	107 N⋅m (79 lb⋅ft) at 3,000 rpm	156 km/h (97 mph)		1983–1984
1,4	TI	AS 31010	1 351	Flat-4	86 (63) at 5,800 rpm	121 N⋅m (89 lb⋅ft) at 4,000 rpm	173 km/h (107 mph)		1984–1986
1,5	TI	AS 31016	1 490	Flat-4	95 (70) at 5,800 rpm	133 N⋅m (98 lb⋅ft) at 4,000 rpm	175 km/h (109 mph)		1984–1987

== Today ==
In June 2000 (when Jeremy Clarkson famously blew one up on Clarkson's Car Years), it was reported that only 341 Alfa Romeo Arnas were still registered with the Driver and Vehicle Licensing Agency in United Kingdom.

As of August 2018, there were only three Arnas shown as registered in the United Kingdom, a 1.2SL and two 1.5Ti, although up to four cars are believed to exist in total. Both of the Arnas recorded are listed with SORNs, meaning that they are no longer legally driven on public highways.
