= Alfa Romeo 75 =

Compact executive car

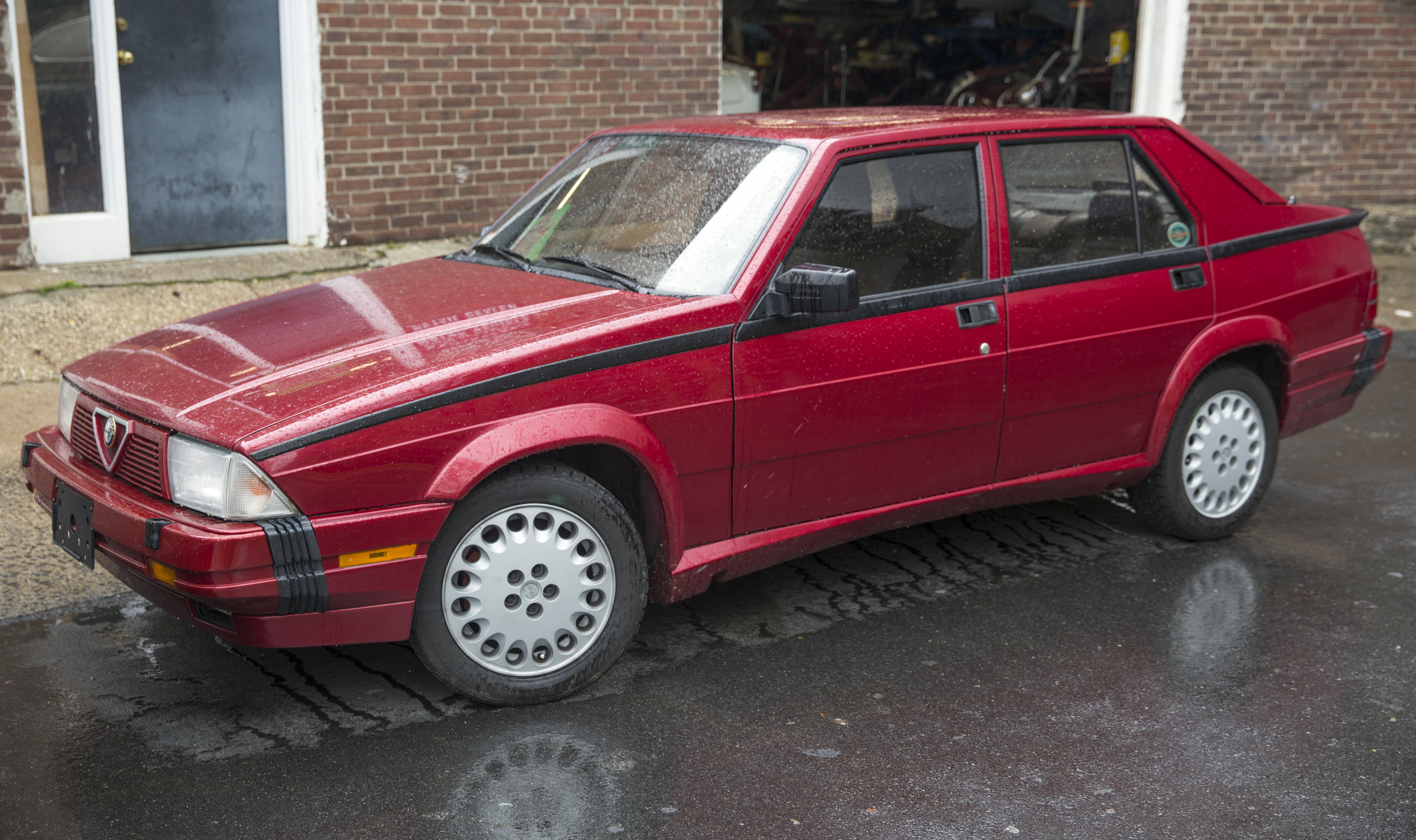
- Alfa Romeo Milano

Overview
- Manufacturer: Alfa Romeo Auto (1985–1986); Alfa-Lancia Industriale (1987–1991); Fiat Auto (1991–1992)
- Also called: Alfa Romeo Milano (North America)
- Production: 1985–1992
- Assembly: Italy: Arese Plant, Lombardy
- Designer: Ermanno Cressoni at Centro Stile Alfa Romeo

Body and chassis
- Class: Compact executive car (D)
- Body style: 4-door saloon
- Layout: Front-engine, rear-wheel-drive
- Related: Alfa Romeo Alfetta; Alfa Romeo GTV6; Alfa Romeo SZ

Powertrain
- Engine: Petrol: 1.6 L Twin Cam I4; 1.8 L Twin Cam I4; 1.8 L Twin Cam turbo I4; 2.0 L Twin Cam I4; 2.0 L Twin Spark I4; 2.5 L Alfa Romeo V6; 3.0 L Alfa Romeo V6; Diesel: 2.0 L turbo I4; 2.4 L turbo I4
- Transmission: 5-speed manual 3-speed automatic

Dimensions
- Wheelbase: 2,510 mm (98.8 in)
- Length: 4,331 mm (170.5 in)
- Width: 1,631 mm (64.2 in)
- Height: 1,349 mm (53.1 in)
- Curb weight: 1,100–1,300 kg (2,425–2,866 lb)

Chronology
- Predecessor: Alfa Romeo Giulietta (116)
- Successor: Alfa Romeo 155

The Alfa Romeo 75 (Type 161, 162B), sold in North America as the Milano, is a compact executive car produced by the Italian automaker Alfa Romeo between 1985 and 1992. The 75 was commercially quite successful: in only three years, 236,907 cars were produced, and by the end of production in 1992, around 386,767 had been built.

The 75 was the last model released before Alfa Romeo was acquired by Fiat. (The Alfa Romeo 164 was the last model developed independently.)

== Overview ==
The 75 was introduced in May 1985 to replace the Giulietta (with which it shared many components), and was named to celebrate Alfa Romeo's 75th anniversary. The body, designed by head of Centro Stile Alfa Romeo Ermanno Cressoni, was styled in a striking wedge shape, tapering at the front with square headlights and a matching grille (similar features were applied to the Cressoni-designed 33).

At the 1986 Turin Auto Show, a prototype of an estate bodystyle of the 75 was presented, an attractive forerunner of the later 156 Sportwagon. This version was, however, never put into production, being cancelled after Fiat took control of Alfa Romeo. The car, dubbed the 75 Turbo Wagon, was made by Italian coachbuilder Rayton Fissore using a 75 Turbo as the basis. However, two estate concept models were unveiled 1987 Geneva Motor Show; one was the Turbo Wagon and the other was a 2.0-litre version named the Sportwagon.

== Technical features ==
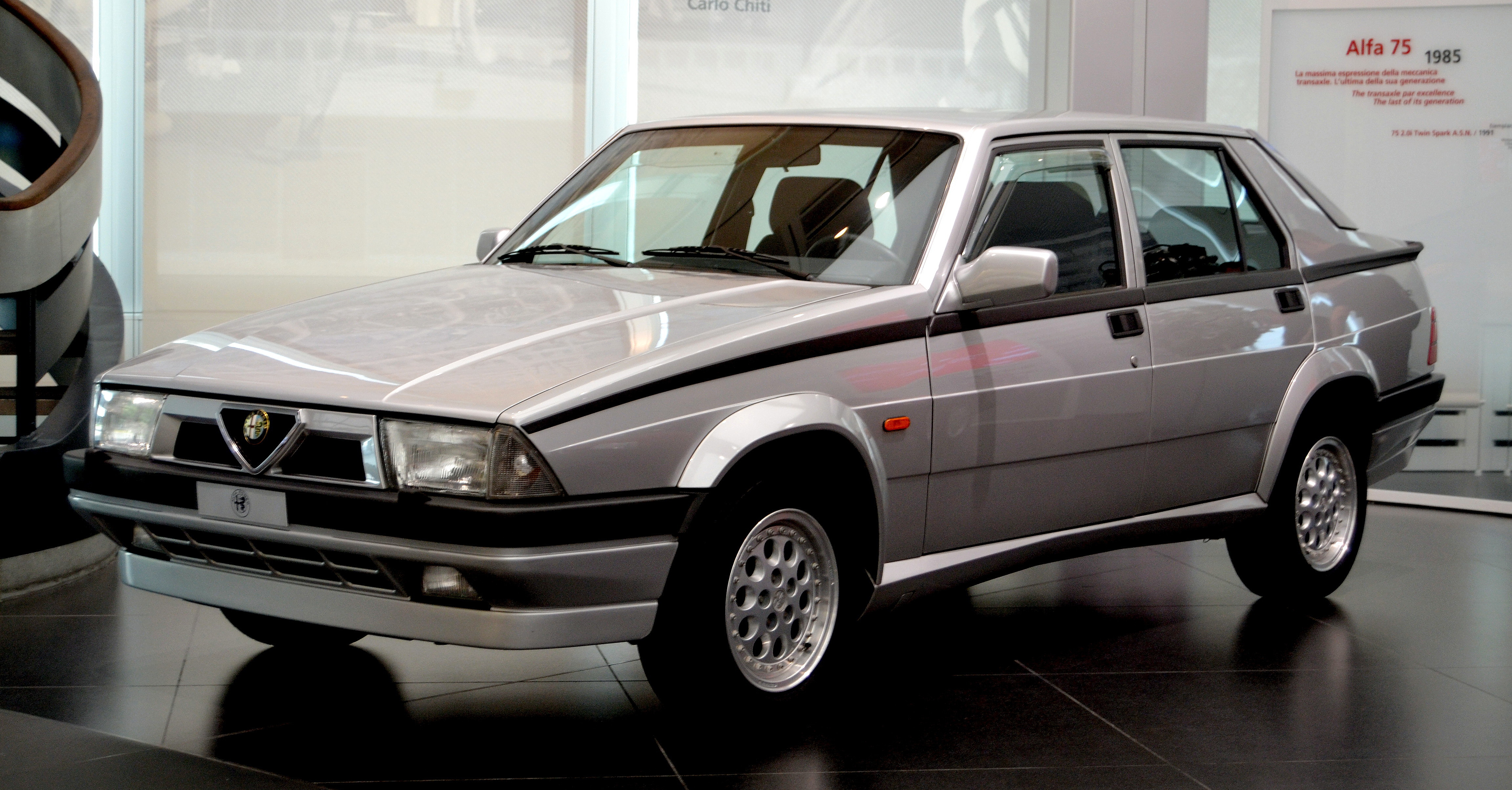
Alfa Romeo 75 Twin Spark 2.0 L

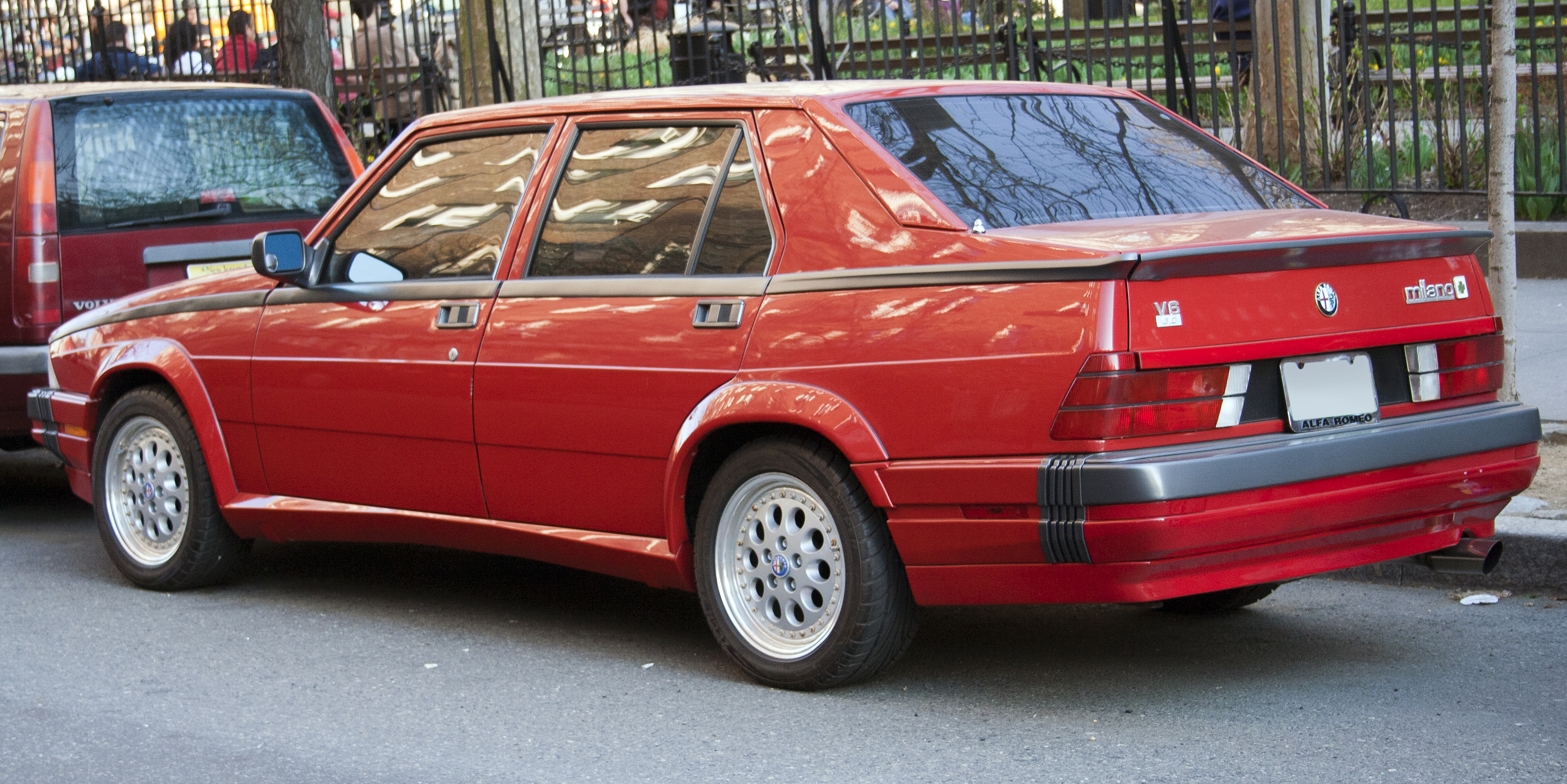
US-market Milano Quadrifoglio Verde, with the 3-litre V6

The 75 featured some unusual technical features, most notably the fact that it was almost perfectly balanced from front to rear. This was achieved by using a transaxle configuration — mounting a standard five-speed gearbox and clutch at the rear, integrated with the rear differential. The front suspension design is a torsion bar and shock absorber combination and the rear an expensive de Dion tube assembled with shock absorbers; these designs were intended to optimise the car's handling; moreover, the rear brake discs were fitted at the centre of the rear axle, near the gearbox-differential group. The engine's crankshaft is bolted directly to the two-segment driveshaft, which runs the length of the underside of the car, from the engine block to the gearbox, and rotates at the speed of the engine. The shaft segments are joined with elastomeric 'doughnuts' to prevent vibration and engine/gearbox damage. The 2.0-litre Twin Spark and the 3.0-litre V6 are equipped with a limited-slip differential.

The 75 featured a then-advanced dashboard-mounted diagnostic computer, called Alfa Romeo Control, capable of monitoring the engine systems and alerting drivers of potential faults.

The 75's engine range at launch featured four-cylinder 1.6, 1.8 and 2.0-litre petrol carbureted engines, a 2.0-litre intercooled turbodiesel engine made by VM Motori, and a 2.5-litre fuel injected V6 engine. The 75 Turbo was introduced in 1986, which featured a fuel-injected 1.8-litre twin-cam engine using a Garrett T3 turbocharger, intercooler and oil cooler.

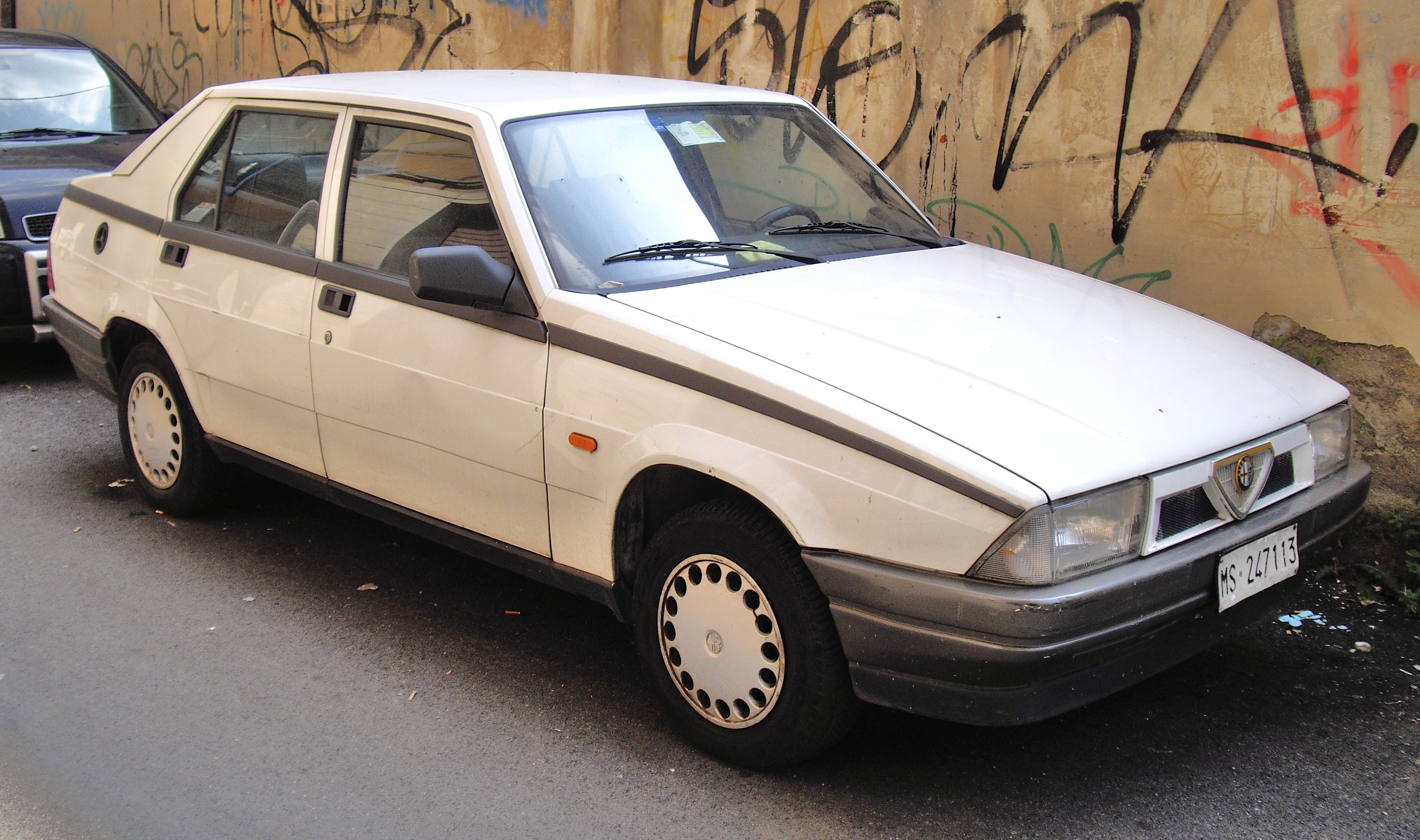
Post facelift model

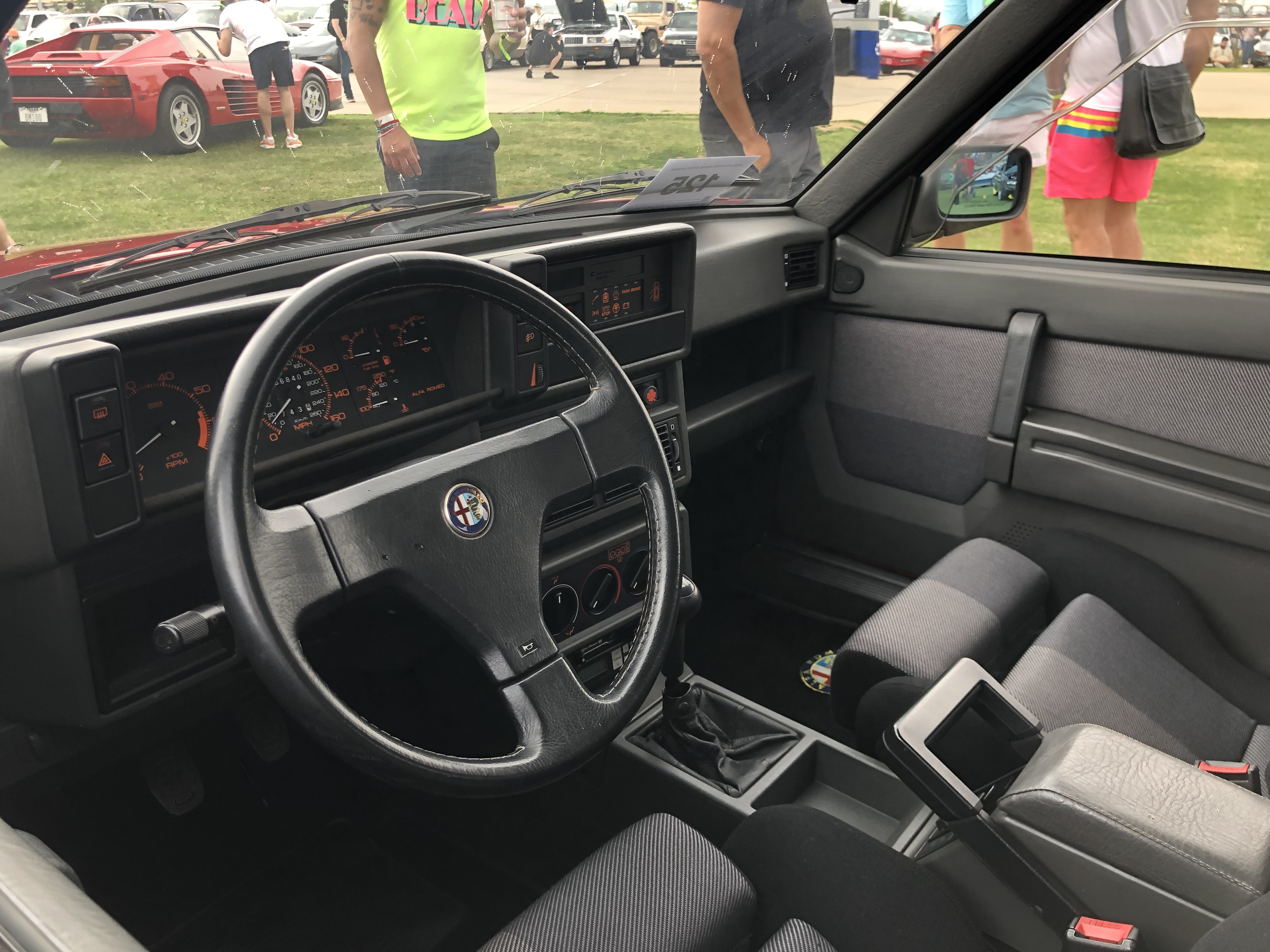
Interior (V6 Milano model)

In 1987, a 3.0-litre V6 was added to the range and the 2.0-litre Alfa Romeo Twin Cam engine was redesigned to have now two spark plugs per cylinder, which engine was named "Twin Spark". With fuel injection and variable valve timing, this engine produced 148 PS (109 kW; 146 hp). This was an early example of a production engine using variable valve timing, though the first to do so was Alfa Romeo's own Spider in 1980. In North America, where the car was known as the Milano, only the 2.5 and 3.0-litre V6 engines were available, from 1987 to 1989.

The North American 2.5-litre engines were fundamentally different from their European counterparts. Due to federal regulations, some modifications were required. Most noticeable from the outside were the 'America' bumpers, with the typical rubber accordion like extensions in them. Furthermore, these bumpers had thick (and heavy) shock-absorbing material inside, and in addition, they were mounted to the vehicle on shock absorbers. To accommodate these shock absorbers, the 'America'-bodies were slightly different from the European ones. Other changes relative to the European model were:

- A 67-litre fuel tank which was located behind the rear seats, reducing the boot capacity from 500 L (18 cu ft) to 390 L (14 cu ft).
- Side-markers in the bumpers
- Exhaust silencer sticking out from under the bumper on the right side of the vehicle instead of at the centre
- Reinforcements in the doors (side impact bar) and boot lid
- Hooks underneath the bonnet (engine hood), to keep the bonnet in position in a crash

The North American cars also had optional levels of equipment (depending on the version: Milano Silver, Gold, Platinum, or Verde). L/h and r/h electrically adjustable outside mirrors, electrically reclining seats and cruise control were usually optional in Europe. The car was also available with a 3-speed ZF automatic gearbox option for the 2.5-litre V6. Other, more common options such as electrically operated rear windows and an A/C system were standard in the USA. The US market cars also had different upholstery styles and different dashboard instrumentation indicating speed in mph, oil pressure in psi and coolant temperature in degrees F, and as a final touch, the AR control was different, and included a seat belt warning light. Some North American specification Milanos were also sold in Switzerland (When catalytic converters were made mandatory in 1987).

The European-spec 2.5 V6 (2.5 6V Iniezione or 2.5QV) was officially sold only between 1985 and 1987, although some of them were not registered until 1989. Relatively few of them were sold (about 2,800 units), especially when the 155 PS (114 kW; 153 hp) 1.8 Turbo was launched, which in some countries was cheaper for taxation reasons because of its lower displacement. To better differentiate between the V6 and the inline fours, the 2.5-litre engine was bored out to 2,959 cc's to deliver 188 PS (138 kW; 185 hp) and this new engine was introduced as the 3.0 America in 1987. As its type designation suggests, the 3.0 only came in the US-specification, with the impact-bumpers and in-boot fuel tank. However, the European 'Americas' were not equipped with side-markers or the door, bonnet and boot lid reinforcements. Depending on the country of delivery, the 3.0 America might be equipped with a catalytic converter.

In 1988, engines were updated again, the carbureted version of the 1.8-litre engine was replaced with a fuel injected variant and a new and bigger diesel engine was added to the range. At the end of 1989, the carbureted version of the 1.6-litre engine was updated to have fuel injection and in 1990 the 1.8-litre turbo and 3.0-litre V6 got some more power and updated suspension. The 3.0 V6 was now equipped with a Motronic digital fuel injection system instead of the previous analog electronic L-Jetronic injection system. The 1.8 L turbo was now also available in 'America'-spec, but strangely enough, was not available in the USA market. The 3.0 V6 did make it to the United States and was sold as the Milano Verde.

Model	Units produced
1.6	99,522
1.6 IE	27,989
1.8	45,138
1.8 IE	48,270
1.8 Turbo/America/Q.V.	6,536
2.0	18,971
2.0 Twin Spark	57,084
2.5 V6 Q.V/Milano	12,611
3.0 V6/America/Q.V./	6,753
2.0 TD	46,273
2.4 TD	6,110
Total	375,257

== Turbo Evoluzione ==
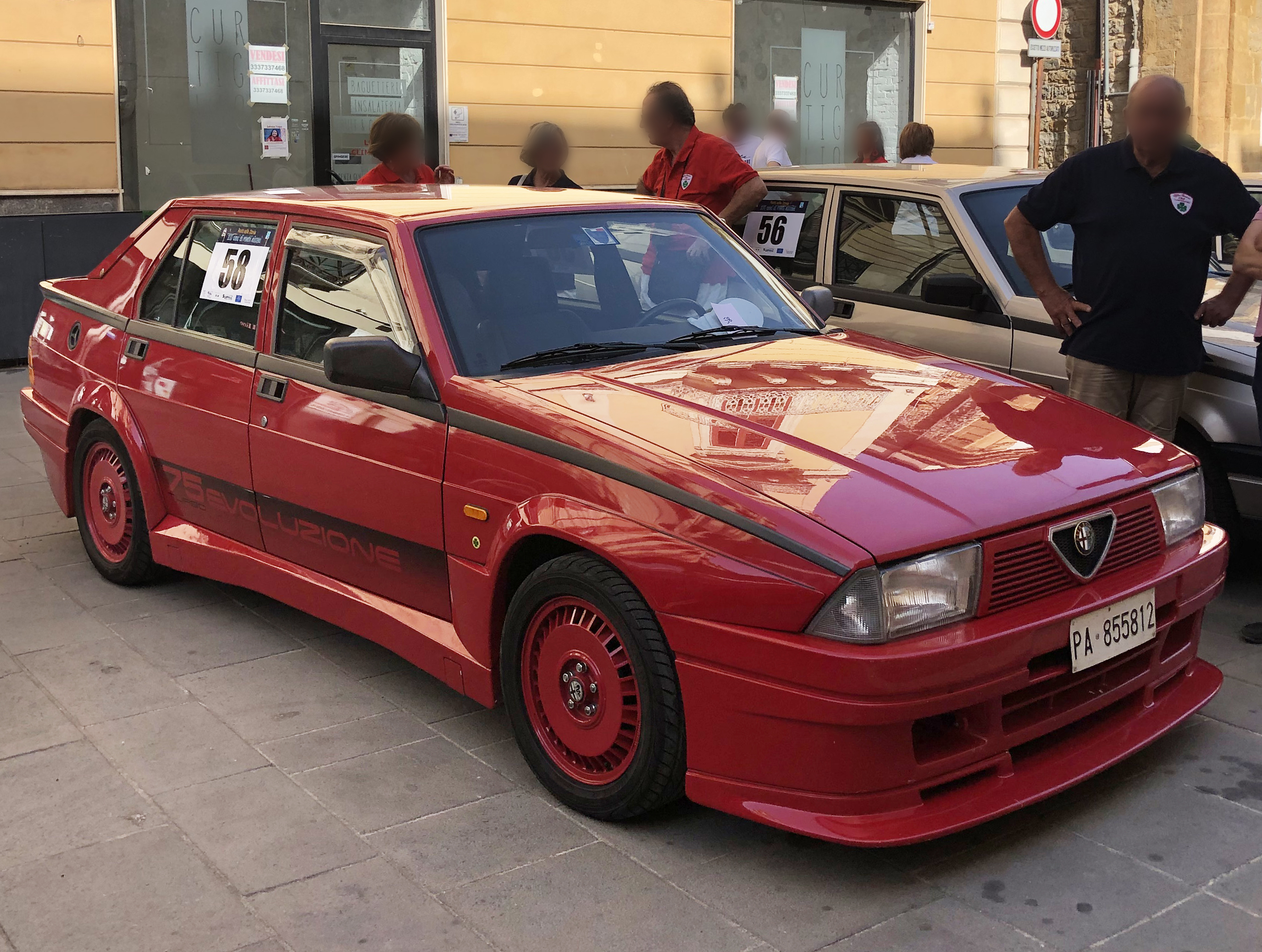
Alfa Romeo 75 Turbo Evoluzione

500 examples of the Turbo Evoluzione were produced in the spring of 1987 to meet Group A requirements as a more potent variant of the 75 turbo to homologate aerodynamic changes to the racing model. The car had many modifications when compared to the standard turbo model. The engine was de-bored from 80 mm to 79.6 mm in order to have a capacity of 1,762 cc (normally 1,779 cc) in order to prevent the race entry from competing in the Class 1 category where it would be highly disadvantageous against the competition. While the claimed power was the same as in the standard turbo, the thicker cylinder walls made the engine better suited to power upgrades than was the standard 75 Turbo engine in competition trim. All 500 cars were left hand drive and a large number of them were sold in the home market of Italy

== Engines ==
Model	Engine layout	Displacement	Fuel system/Air delivery	Power	Torque	Note
Launch, May 1985
1.6 L	I4	1,570 cc	Carburettor/NA	110 PS (81 kW) at 5,800 rpm	146 N⋅m (108 lb⋅ft) at 4,000 rpm	-
1.8 L	I4	1,779 cc	Carburettor/NA	120 PS (88 kW) at 5,300 rpm	170 N⋅m (125 lb⋅ft) at 4,000 rpm	-
2.0 L	I4	1,962 cc	Carburettor/NA	128 PS (94 kW) at 5,400 rpm	183 N⋅m (135 lb⋅ft) at 4,000 rpm	-
2.0 L TD	I4	1,995 cc	Turbodiesel	95 PS (70 kW) at 4,300 rpm	192 N⋅m (142 lb⋅ft) at 2,300 rpm	Available in left hand drive markets only.
2.5 L	V6	2,492 cc	Fuel injection/NA	156 PS (115 kW) at 5,600 rpm	206 N⋅m (152 lb⋅ft) at 3,200 rpm	-
1986
1.8 L Turbo	I4	1,779 cc	Fuel injection/Turbocharger	155 PS (114 kW) at 5,800 rpm	226 N⋅m (167 lb⋅ft) at 2,600 rpm	-
1987
1.8 L Turbo EVOLUZIONE	I4	1.762 cc	Fuel injection/Turbocharger	155 PS (114 kW) at 5,800 rpm	226 N⋅m (167 lb⋅ft) at 2,600 rpm	-
2.0 L TS	I4	1,962 cc	Fuel injection/NA	148 PS (109 kW) at 5,800 rpm	186 N⋅m (137 lb⋅ft) at 4,000 rpm	Twin Spark. Addition of FI to the pre-existing 2.0 L engine.
3.0 L	V6	2,959 cc	Fuel injection/NA	188 PS (138 kW) at 5,800 rpm	250 N⋅m (184 lb⋅ft) at 3,000 rpm	Available only in the Milano Quadrifoglio Verde (North American market).
1988
1.6 L Catalytic	I4	1,570 cc	Fuel injection/NA	105 PS (77 kW) at 6,000 rpm	132 N⋅m (97 lb⋅ft) at 4,000 rpm	-
1.8 L i.e.	I4	1,779 cc	Fuel injection/NA	122 PS (90 kW) at 5,500 rpm	157 N⋅m (116 lb⋅ft) at 4,000 rpm	Addition of FI to the pre-existing 1.8 L engine.
2.4 L TD	I4	2,393 cc	Turbodiesel	112 PS (82 kW) at 4,200 rpm	235 N⋅m (173 lb⋅ft) at 2,400 rpm	-
3.0 L V6 America Catalytic	V6	2,959 cc	Fuel injection/NA	188 PS (138 kW) at 5,800 rpm	250 N⋅m (184 lb⋅ft) at 3,000 rpm	Available in the European market only.
1990
1.6 L i.e.	I4	1,570 cc	Fuel injection/NA	107 PS (79 kW) at 6,000 rpm	137 N⋅m (101 lb⋅ft) at 4,000 rpm	-
1.8 L Turbo Quadrifoglio Verde	I4	1,779 cc	Fuel injection/Turbocharger	165 PS (121 kW) at 5,800 rpm	226 N⋅m (167 lb⋅ft) at 2,600 rpm	-
2.0 L TS Catalytic	I4	1,962 cc	Fuel injection/NA	148 PS (109 kW) at 5,800 rpm	186 N⋅m (137 lb⋅ft) at 4,000 rpm	Twin Spark. Replaced the previous 2.0 L engine.
3.0 L V6 QV	V6	2,959 cc	Fuel injection/NA	192 PS (141 kW) at 5,800 rpm	250 N⋅m (184 lb⋅ft) at 3,000 rpm	Replacing the previous 3.0 L, this engine from the 164 featured Motronic fuel injection rather than the earlier L-Jetronic. This model was known as the "Potenziata."

== Motorsports ==
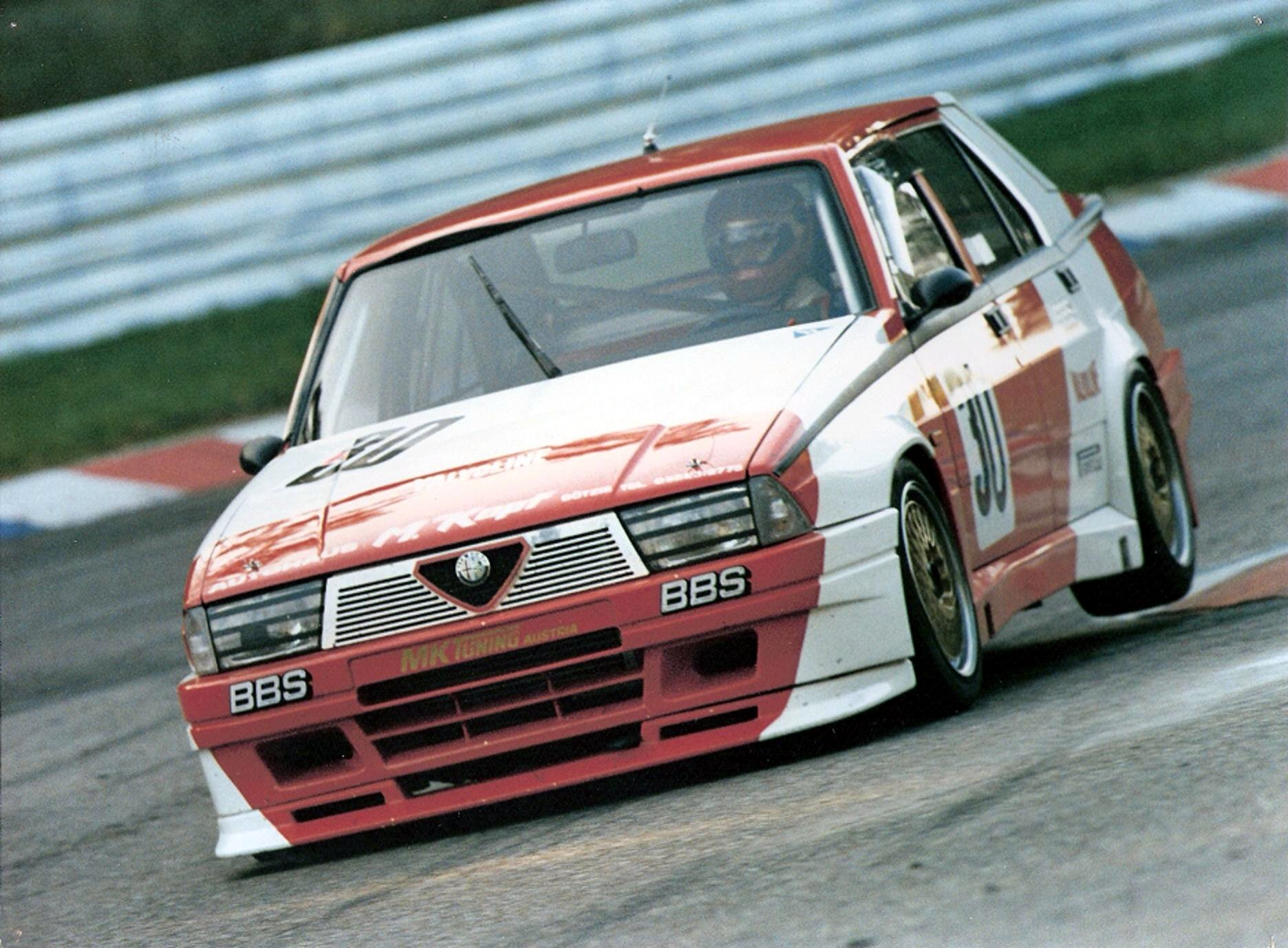
Michael Kopf with Alfa 75 Turbo in Nürburgring 1986 DTM.

Alfa Romeo and its racing department Alfa Corse raced the 75 Turbo Group A in the World Touring Car Championship in the 1987 season. There were six official entries with two being run directly by Alfa Corse, two by Brixia Corse, one by Albatech and one by the Swedish team Q-Racing, with drivers including Formula One veterans such as Jacques Laffite and Mario Andretti, future touring car champions Nicola Larini and Gabriele Tarquini, and future World Sportscar champion Jean-Louis Schlesser. The Class 2 car had enough power (approximately 320 bhp (239 kW; 324 PS)) to be on par with the new and more track focused BMW M3. However, Alfa Romeo had very little success in the WTCC and with the whole season descending into a political farce, Alfa Romeo team boss Cesare Fiorio withdrew the team before the overseas races.

Australian driver Colin Bond, winner of the 1975 Australian Touring Car Championship and 1969 Hardie-Ferodo 500, had been racing the GTV6 since 1984. Remaining loyal to Alfa Romeo, he ran a Caltex sponsored Alfa 75 turbo in the 1987 Australian Touring Car Championship, replacing the GTV6. Bond's new 75 was built by the Italian Luigi team, but the Caltex team found that the engine produced about 200 bhp (149 kW; 203 PS) rather than the promised 320 bhp (239 kW; 324 PS). This saw him finish in a distant 9th place in the championship while the team's engine builder, Melbourne-based Alfa expert tuner Joe Beninca, tried to reclaim the missing 120 bhp (89 kW; 122 PS). This was finally achieved by converting the car to right hand drive, allowing for an exhaust system that did not wind around the steering rack. Bond also drove the end of season endurance races including the Bathurst race of the WTCC. After Bond qualified in 21st, co-driver Lucio Cesario destroyed the front of the 75 in a crash at the top of the mountain on lap 34 of the race, forcing the car's withdrawal from the Calder Park and Wellington races of the WTCC. The car was repaired in time for the Australian Grand Prix support races in Adelaide where Bond qualified for a second place start and finished 5th in the car's "down under" swansong. Bond was the only driver to embrace the 75 in Australia but switched to race the all-conquering Ford Sierra RS500 starting in 1988 in a bid to return to the winners circle.

Gianfranco Brancatelli won the 1988 ITC series with Alfa 75 Turbo and Giorgio Francia placed second in the 1991 ITC. The 9th Giro d'Italia automobilistico in 1988 was won by the team of Miki Biasion, Tiziano Siviero and Riccardo Patrese with a 75 Turbo Evoluzione IMSA. A 75 Turbo Evoluzione IMSA also won the 10th Giro d'Italia automobilistico in 1989.

The British Alfa Romeo Dealer Team ran a pair of cars in the 1986–87 seasons with drivers Rob Kirby and John Dooley. Racing in Class B, the team started with the V6 version of the 75, alongside the older GTV6, before upgrading to the 75 Turbo. They were able to match the pace of the Ford Escort RS Turbos but once Frank Sytner's BMW M3 appeared, they were rendered uncompetitive.
