= Alfa Romeo 33 =

Small family car produced by the Italian automaker Alfa Romeo

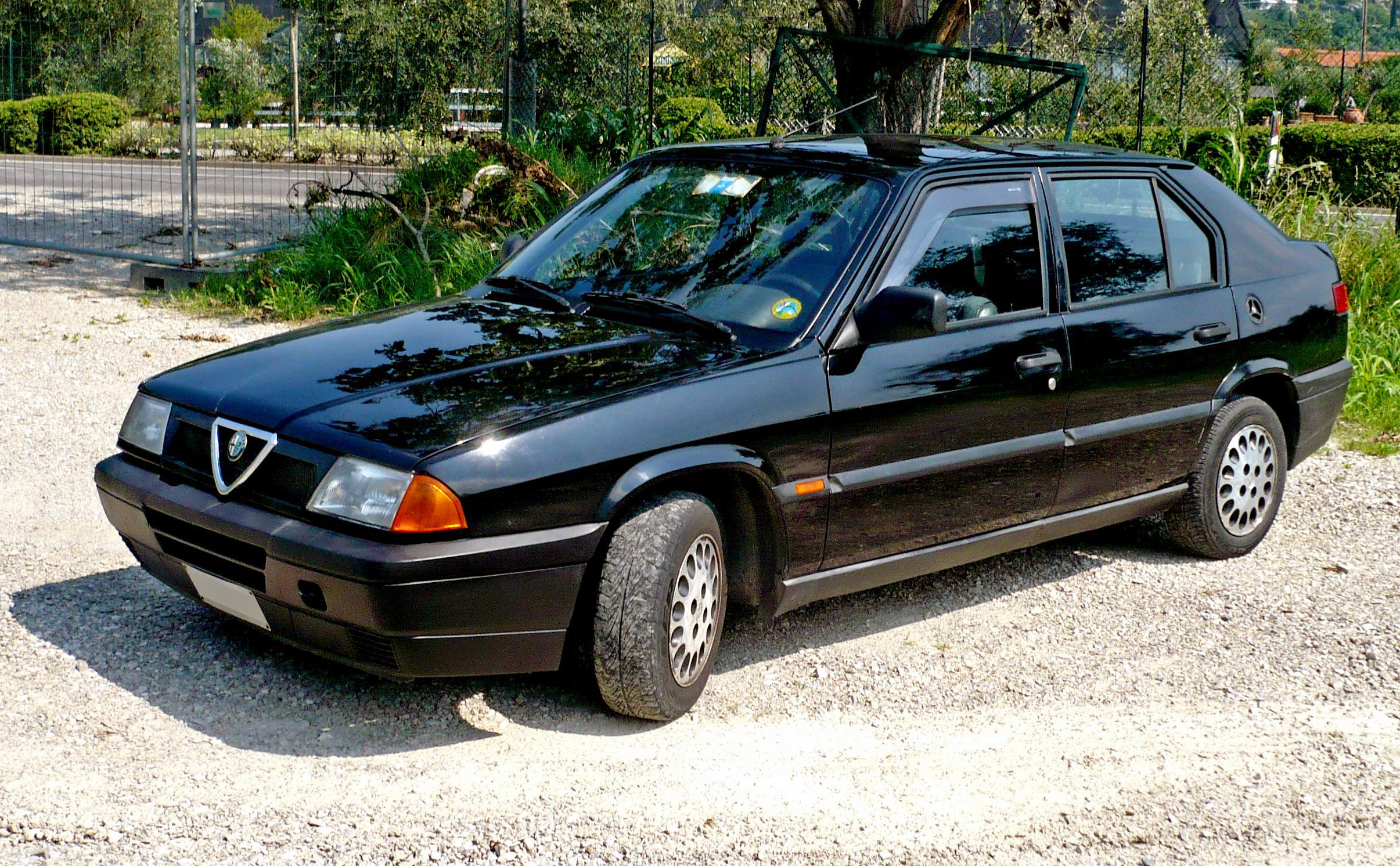
- Alfa Romeo 33 second series

Overview
- Manufacturer: Alfa Romeo
- Production: 1983–1995
- Assembly: Italy: Pomigliano d'Arco plant, Campania; Italy: Pininfarina Grugliasco plant, Piedmont (Note: Pininfarina produced the first series 33 4x4 Berlina between 1983 and 1985, and 33 Giardinetta between 1984 and 1986.); South Africa: Rosslyn, Brits (Alfa Romeo SA (Pty) Ltd)
- Designer: Ermanno Cressoni at Centro Stile Alfa Romeo; Pininfarina (estate)

Body and chassis
- Class: Small family car (C)
- Body style: 5-door hatchback 5-door estate
- Layout: Longitudinal front-engine, front-wheel-drive/four-wheel-drive
- Related: Alfa Romeo Alfasud; Alfa Romeo Sprint

Powertrain
- Engine: petrol: 1.2 L Boxer H4; 1.4 L Boxer H4; 1.5 L Boxer H4; 1.7 L Boxer H4; 1.7 L Boxer 16V H4; diesel: 1.8 L VM HRT 392 turbo I3
- Transmission: 5-speed manual

Dimensions
- Wheelbase: 2,475 mm (97.4 in); 2,470 mm (97.2 in) (4x4)
- Length: 4,075 mm (160.4 in)
- Width: 1,615 mm (63.6 in)
- Height: 1,350–1,375 mm (53.1–54.1 in)
- Kerb weight: 890–1,070 kg (1,962–2,359 lb)

Chronology
- Predecessor: Alfa Romeo Alfasud; Alfa Romeo Arna
- Successor: Alfa Romeo 145 and 146

The Alfa Romeo 33 (Type 905 and 907) is a small family car produced by the Italian automaker Alfa Romeo from 1983 to 1995. From a mechanical standpoint it was an evolution of its predecessor, the Alfasud, whose floorpan, chassis and drivetrain were carried over — albeit with simplifications to the suspension and braking system, eschewing the Alfasud's inboard front brakes for instance. The Nissan-based Alfa Romeo Arna was launched shortly thereafter, offering a similarly sized but lower priced car.

The 33 has a unique place in Alfa Romeo history, as nearly 1 million of these cars were produced. During its 11-year lifespan the 33 got a minor facelift in 1986 and a major restyle in 1989. The 33 was discontinued in 1995 and replaced by the Alfa Romeo 145 and 146, which used the same Alfa Romeo Boxer engines but an entirely new platform based on the Fiat Tipo.

== First series (1983–1986) ==
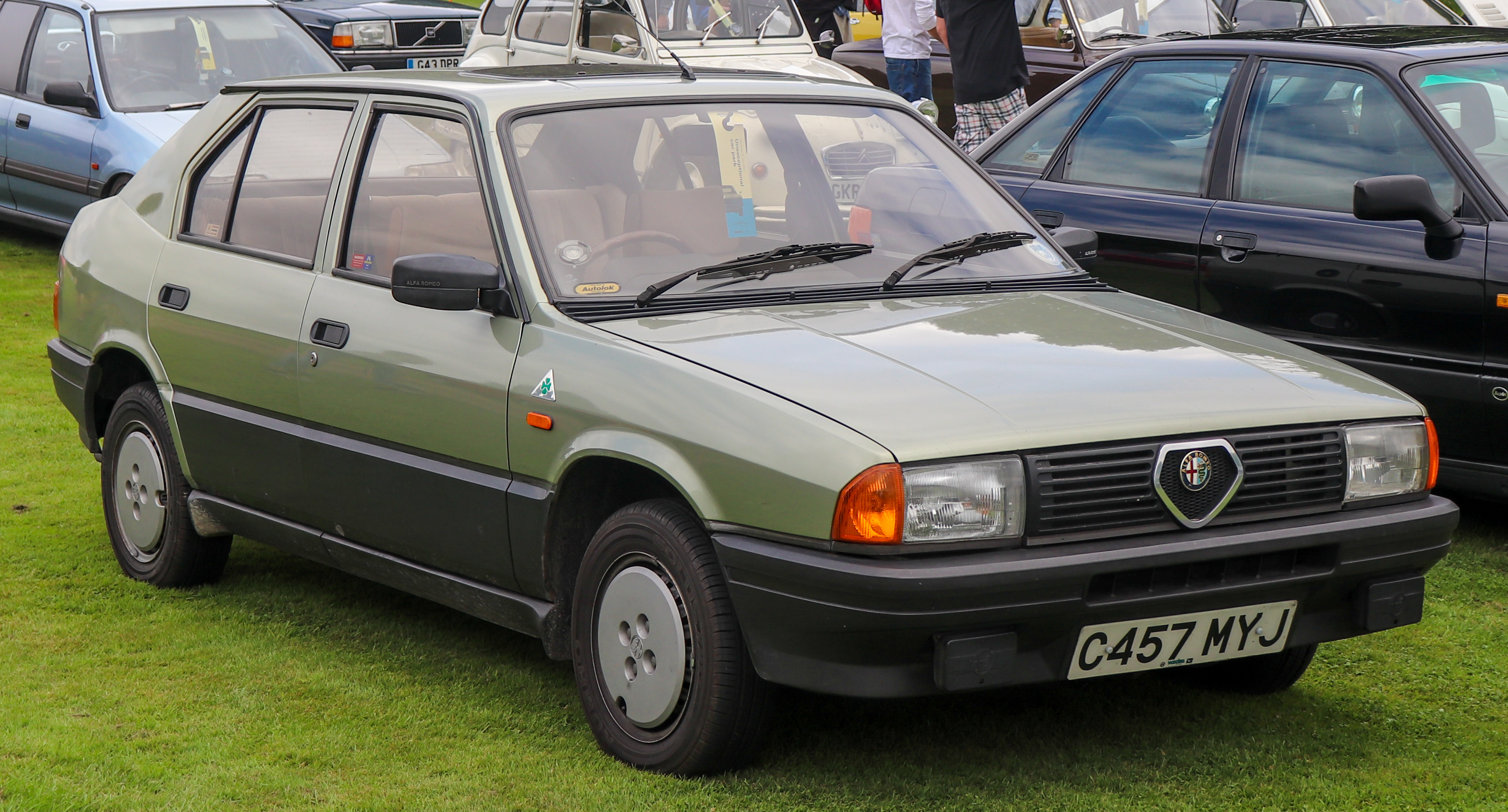
A first series 33 Berlina

Initially known as the Alfa 33 (Type 905), the 5-door hatchback was launched in 1983 and a station wagon version (initially badged Giardinetta, later badged Sportwagon) was introduced the following year at the same time as a four-wheel drive version of the hatchback. The hatchback was styled by Ermanno Cressoni at the Centro Stile Alfa Romeo, while the station wagon was designed by Pininfarina.

The 33 became renowned for its nimble handling and powerful boxer engines, but also became equally well known for its unreliable electronics and tendencies to rust (a frequent complaint on Italian cars in general at the time). Another issue was its braking and increased unsprung weight—the Alfasud's inboard front disc brakes (mounted on the gearbox) had been moved to the more common outboard discs (mounted on the wheel hubs). The rear discs of the Alfasud's four-wheel disc arrangement were replaced with drums.

The car featured numerous innovations for the company, including an instrument binnacle that moved up and down with the adjustable steering wheel. The UK launch promoted the sleek design. It had a drag coefficient of 0.36.

At launch two models were available, 33 1.3 and 33 1.5 Quadrifoglio Oro. Both engines were SOHC boxers fed by a twin-choke carburettor, carried over from the Alfasud along with its 5-speed gearbox: a 1,350 cc developing 76 PS (56 kW; 75 hp) at 6,000 rpm, and a 1,490 cc developing 85 PS (63 kW; 84 hp) at 5,800 rpm. Unlike on the Alfasud, fifth gear acted like an overdrive gear and top speed was reached in fourth. The luxurious 1.5 Quadrifoglio Oro (Gold Cloverleaf in the UK) was distinguished by a silver grille, two-tone paintwork (metallic paint upper body separated by a brown tape from the dark brown lower body and bumpers) and clear front turn indicator lenses outside; by beige Texalfa leatherette/cloth interior, a woodtone steering wheel and shifter knob inside. Standard equipment included bronze tinted glass, headlight wipers, passenger side wing mirror and a trip computer.

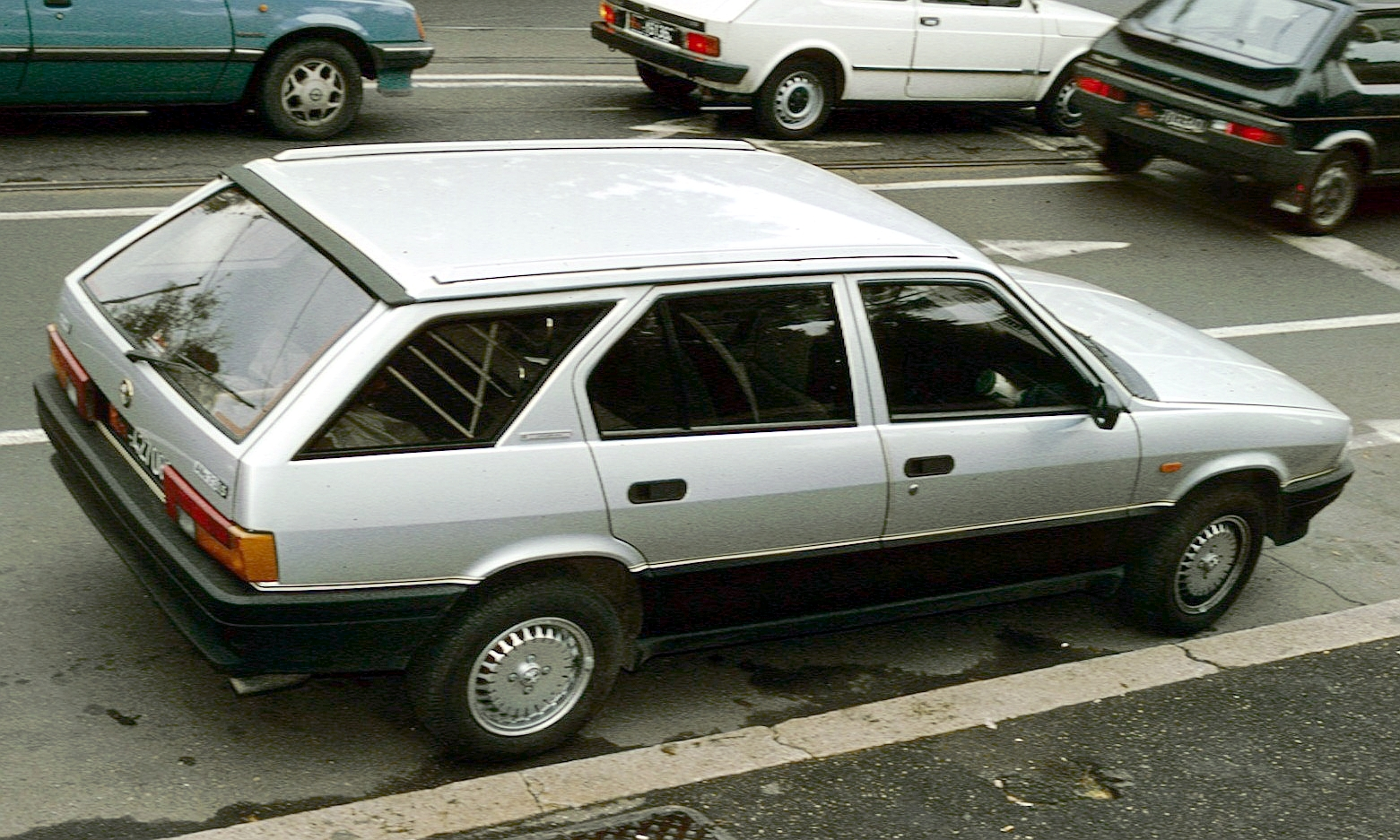
1984 33 1.5 Giardinetta

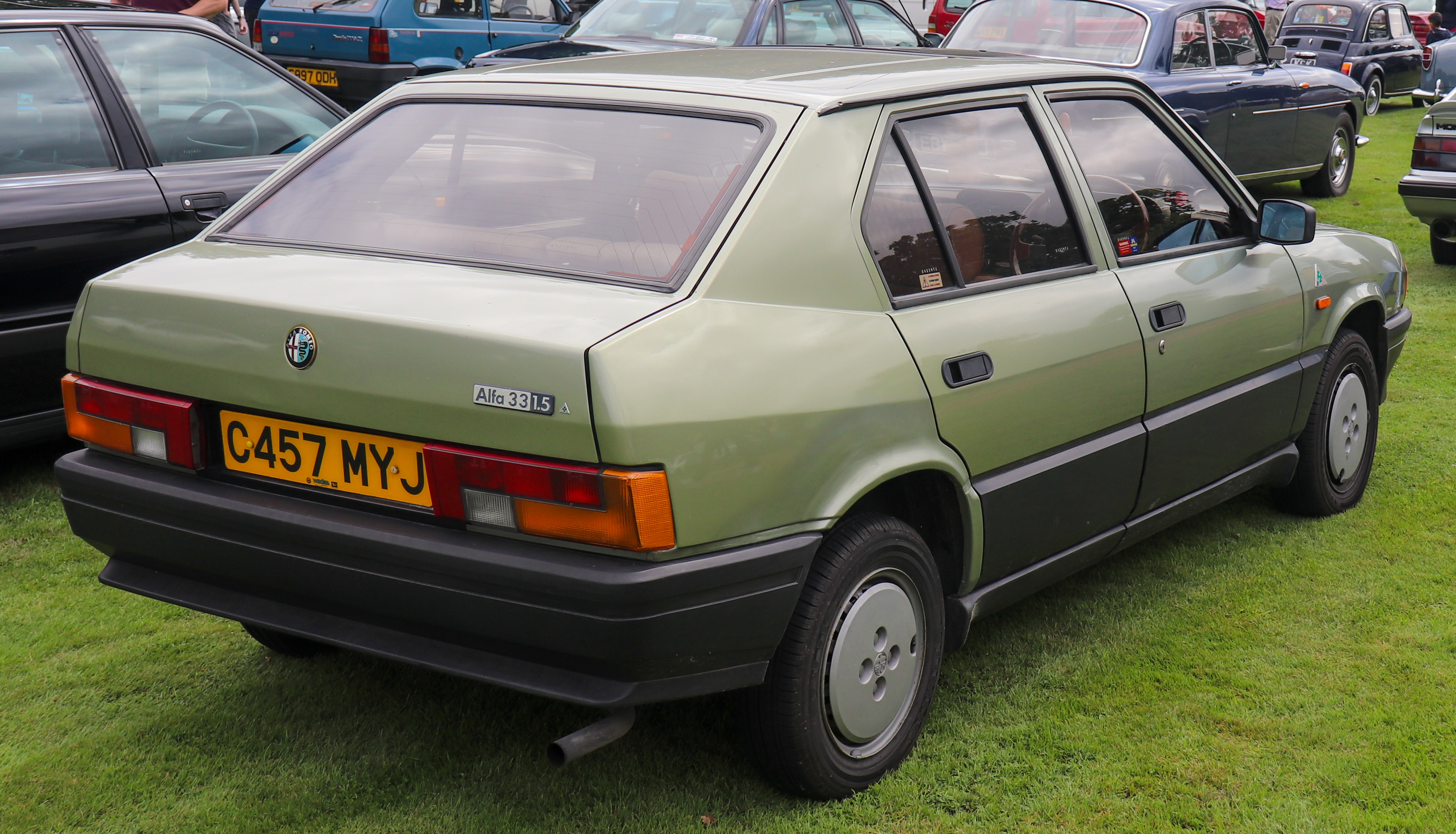
33 Berlina Rear

A four-wheel-drive variant, the 33 1.5 4x4, was introduced in at the 1983 Frankfurt Motor Show and put on sale in December. The bodywork was built by Pininfarina in Grugliasco, Turin and shipped to Alfa Romeo who installed the mechanical components. Normally front-wheel drive, the "quick shift" four-wheel drive system could be engaged manually by the driver at any speed, via a handle in front of the gear lever. The system was developed by all-wheel drive specialists Ototrasm. Like the Quadrifoglio Oro the 4x4 was characterised by two-tone paint, either metallic red or silver separated from a black lower body by a double white pinstripe; the grille matched the body colour. Equipment level was also the same as on the richer Quadrifoglio Oro; ride height was raised in comparison to standard 33s.

The 33 1.5 Giardinetta (Estate in the UK), a 5-door estate designed and—like the 4x4 hatchback—assembled by Pininfarina, made its début at the March 1984 Geneva Motor Show. The Giardinetta went on sale in 4x4 guise in June and was joined later in the year by a front-wheel drive model, shown at the Turin Motor Show in November.

Another Quadrifoglio top of the range model, this time the sporting 1.5 Quadrifoglio Verde (Green Cloverleaf in the UK), was put on sale in June 1984. It was powered by a 105 PS (77 kW; 104 hp) version of the 1,490 cc boxer, equipped with double twin-choke carburettors like on the Sprint 1.5 QV coupé; Alfa Romeo claimed a top speed of over 185 km/h (115 mph). The Quadrifoglio Verde could be recognized from its specific grille, additional plastic spoilers under both body-colour bumpers, side skirts, and grey 8-hole alloy wheels with low profile 185/60 HR14 tyres; it was only available in two paint colours—Alfa red or optional metallic silver—highlighted by a light grey stripe in the body side indent. In the cabin there were sport seats in black and grey cloth, a leather covered steering wheel and additional gauges for voltmeter and oil pressure.

October 1984 saw the introduction of the updated model year 1985 range, later displayed at the 60th Turin Motor Show. All models save for the base 1.3 were upgraded to one-choke-per-cylinder twin carburettor setups—as on the Quadrifoglio Verde. This gave birth to a sportier 1.3-litre model, the 33 1.3 S, which put out 86 PS (63 kW; 85 hp) at 5,500 rpm, or 10 PS more than the standard; the 1.5 on the estates and Quadrifoglio Oro now had 95 PS (70 kW; 94 hp). Minor changes were made to the equipment of most models but the recently introduced 1.5 QV, such as the adoption of side skirts and a black grille on the Quadrifoglio Oro. With the arrival of the 1.3 S and front-wheel-drive Giardinetta, for 1985 the lineup included seven models: 1.3, 1.3 S, 1.5 Quadrifoglio Oro, 1.5 Quadrifoglio Verde, 1.5 4x4, 1.5 Giardinetta and 1.5 Giardinetta 4x4.

=== Engines ===
All flat-4 petrol engines:

Engine	Years	Displacement	Fuel system	Power	Torque
1.2		1.2 L (1,186 cc)	Single-choke carburettor	50 kW (68 PS; 67 bhp) at 6,000 rpm	92 N⋅m (68 lb⋅ft) at 3,200 rpm
1.3	1983–1986	1.4 L (1,351 cc)	Twin-choke carburettor	58 kW (79 PS; 78 bhp) at 6,000 rpm	113 N⋅m (83 lb⋅ft) at 3,500 rpm
1.3 S	1984–1986	1.4 L (1,351 cc)	2 twin-choke carburettors	63 kW (86 PS; 84 bhp) at 5,800 rpm	121 N⋅m (89 lb⋅ft) at 4,000 rpm
1.5	1983–1985	1.5 L (1,490 cc)	Twin-choke carburettor	62 kW (84 PS; 83 bhp) at 5,800 rpm	123 N⋅m (91 lb⋅ft) at 3,500 rpm
1.5	1984–1986	1.5 L (1,490 cc)	2 twin-choke carburettors	70 kW (95 PS; 94 bhp) at 5,750 rpm	133 N⋅m (98 lb⋅ft) at 4,000 rpm
1.5 (QV)	1984–1986	1.5 L (1,490 cc)	2 twin-choke carburettors	77 kW (105 PS; 103 bhp) at 6,000 rpm	133 N⋅m (98 lb⋅ft) at 4,000 rpm

== First series facelift (1986–1989) ==
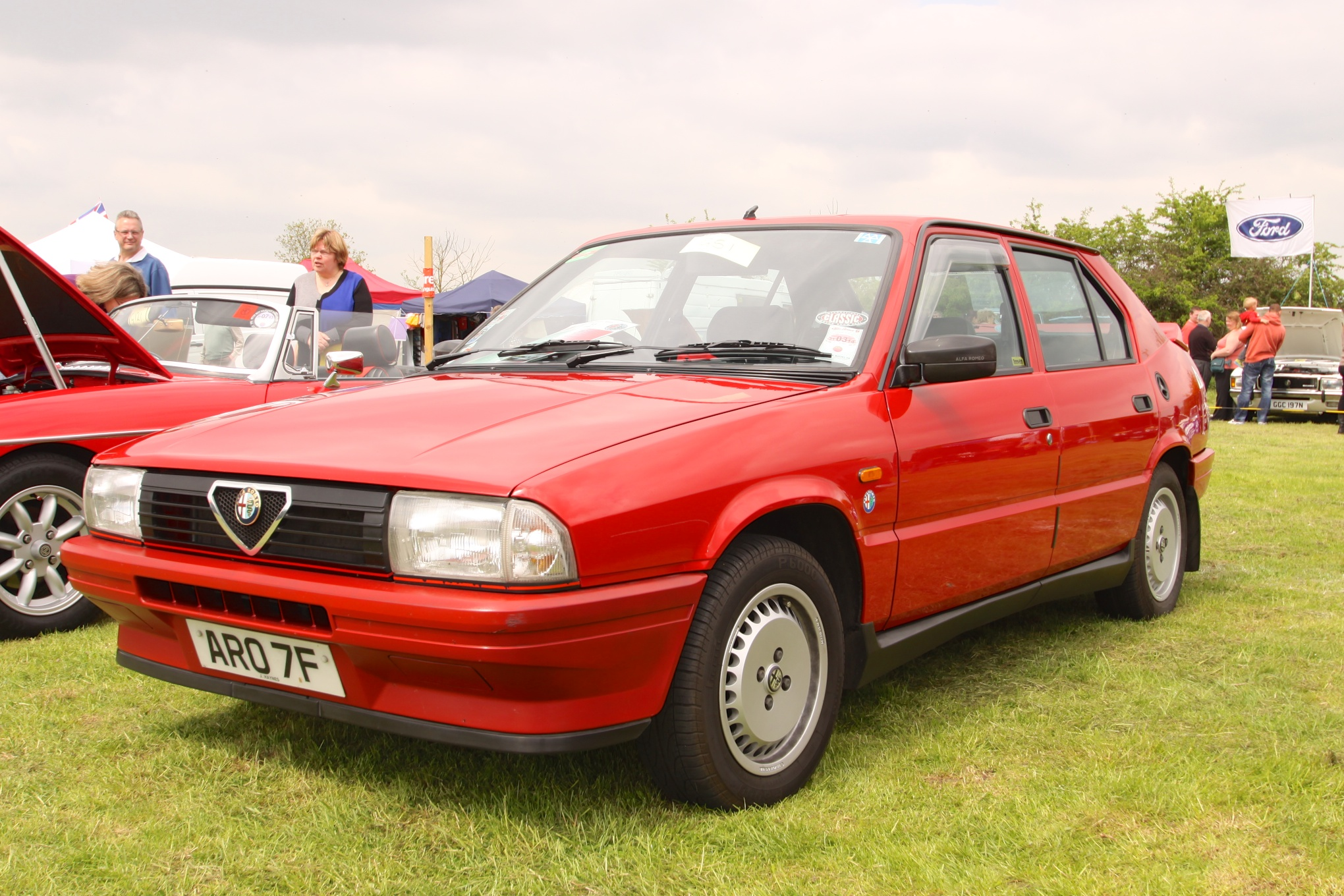
1986–88 Alfa Romeo 33 1.7 Green Cloverleaf

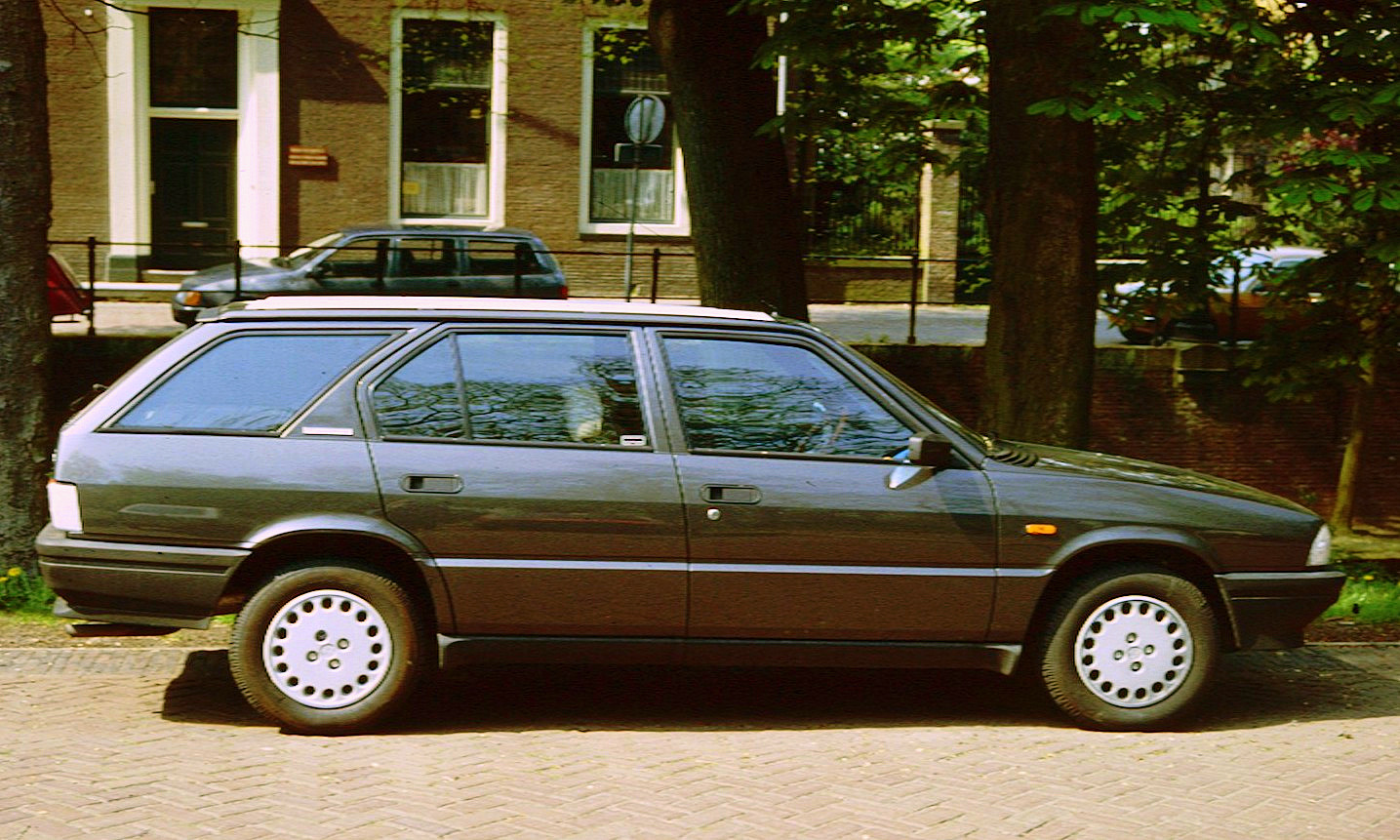
1986–90 Alfa Romeo 33 estate

In autumn 1986 a mild facelift resulted in a revised range. Exterior alterations were limited to clear instead of amber-coloured indicator lenses, new wheel covers and alloy wheels, the adoption of side skirts by all models, and a redesigned front grille; two-tone paint schemes were discontinued. If outside there were only detail changes, the interior was more deeply revised; starting from a more conventionally designed dashboard and steering wheel, which superseded the innovative moveable instrument binnacle. All 1.5 variants now had the 105 PS engine from the now discontinued 1.5 QV; a TI (Turismo Internazionale, International Touring) trim level was exclusive to the front-wheel drive 1.5 hatchback. Changes were made to the suspension, brakes and gearbox, with closer-spaced ratios.

A new 1,712 cc (104.5 cu in), 118 PS (87 kW; 116 bhp) engine was introduced on the 1.7 Quadrifoglio Verde, which replaced the 1.5 QV. The 1.7 engine was developed from the 1.5 by enlarging bore and stroke; it also used new cylinder heads, incorporating hydraulic tappets. To cope with the increased power the new QV was equipped with vented front brake discs. The 1.7 QV looked close to its predecessor, but had lost the grey mid-body stripe and gained new alloy wheels, front side window wind deflectors, more pronounced side skirts and a rear body-colour spoiler on the boot lid. Inside it featured a leather-covered steering wheel, red carpets, and leatherette-backed sport seats upholstered in a grey/black/red chequered cloth.

On the Italian and some other markets a 1.8 TD turbodiesel variant was also available. Like all diesels fitted to Alfa Romeo passenger cars at the time, it was supplied by VM Motori. In order to fit in an engine bay designed for the particularly short boxer engine, a straight-three layout had to be chosen; a balance shaft helped offset vibrations. Fitted with a KKK turbocharger—but no intercooler—the 1,779 cc (108.6 cu in) diesel produced 54 kW (73 PS; 72 bhp). In all the 1986 models were nine: 1.3, 1.3 S, 1.5 TI, 1.5 4x4, 1.7 Quadrifoglio Verde and 1.8 TD Berlinas (hatchbacks), and 1.5, 1.5 4x4 and 1.8 TD Giardinettas. In the United Kingdom only 1.5 and 1.7 Green Cloverleaf hatchback models were sold, as well as a market-specific 1.7 Sportwagon estate; all three were also available in "Veloce" versions, outfitted by Alfa Romeo GB with a colour-matching Zender body kit.

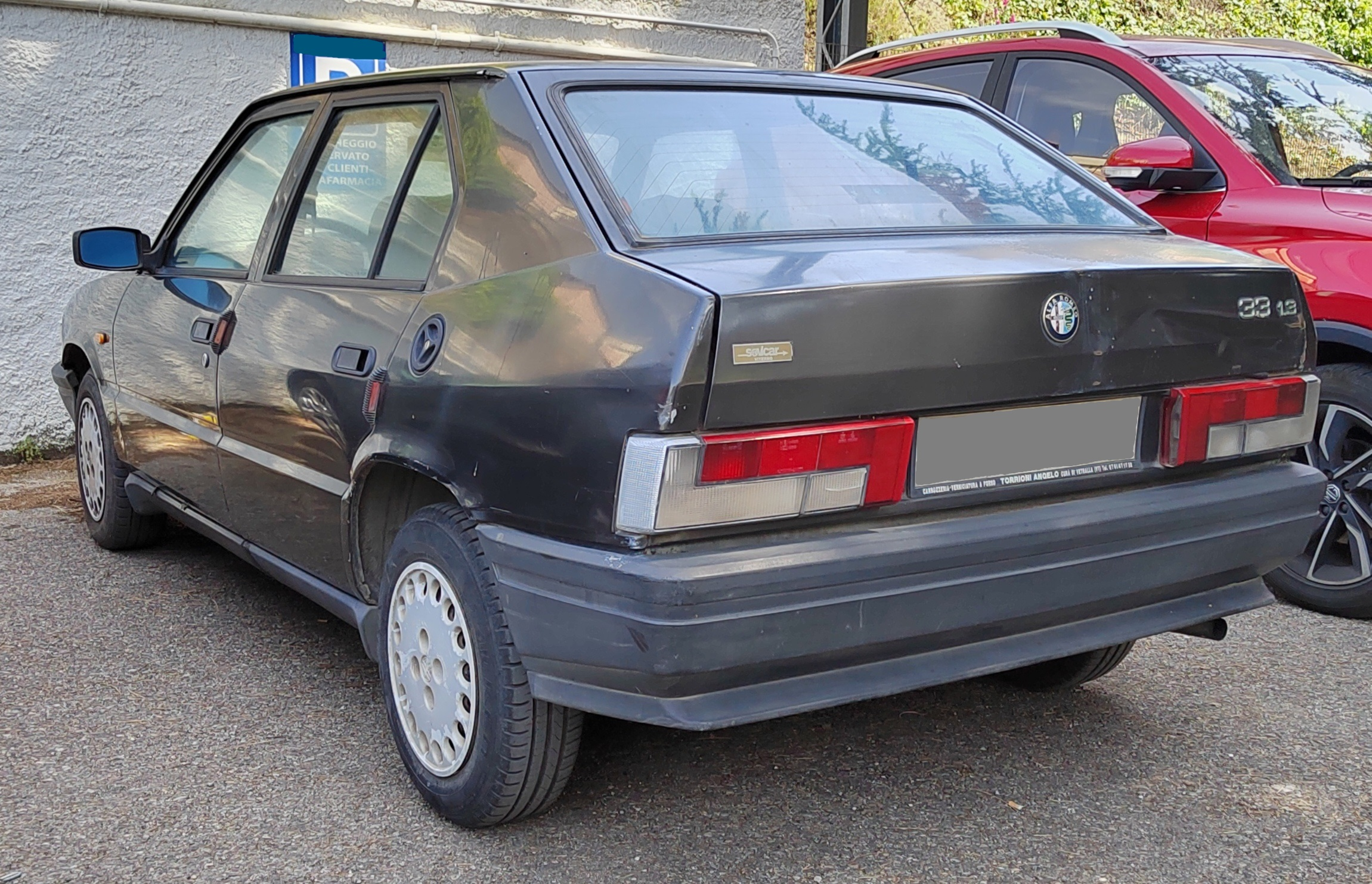
Rear view of a facelifted first series 33

During 1988 the last updates before the major 1990 model revision were phased in. In April the Giardinetta was rechristened Sport Wagon, and became available in 1.3 S, 1.5 4x4, 1.7 Quadrifoglio Verde and 1.8 TD variants. The first fuel injected petrol-engined 33, the 33 1.7 IE, was introduced a few months later, in July. It was the 1,712 cc boxer from the 1.7 QV, fitted with Bosch 3.1 LE Jetronic electronic fuel injection and electronic ignition as well; it developed 110 PS (81 kW; 108 bhp), slightly less than the carburetted version. In some countries it was also marketed in a catalytic converter-equipped variant. The 1.7 IE was distinguished from other models by the Quadrifoglio's side skirts, slate grey painted bumpers, and velour upholstery. At the same time all models got some cosmetic tweaks: the upper bar in the grille was now matched to body colour, there was Glen plaid cloth upholstery on base models, and Quadrifoglio Verdes sported red piping across the front end, where bumper and grille met.

=== Engines ===
Alfa Romeo listed outputs in ECE as well as DIN ratings, leading to a variety of slightly different numbers being listed. The figures listed are DIN outputs from 1988.

Engine	Years	Type	Displacement	Fuel system	Power	Torque
Petrol engines
1.3	1986–90	flat-4	1,351 cc (82.4 cu in)	Twin-choke carburetor	58 kW (79 PS; 78 bhp) at 6,000 rpm	111 N⋅m (82 lb⋅ft) at 3,500 rpm
1.3 S	1986–90	flat-4	1,351 cc (82.4 cu in)	2 twin-choke carburettors	63 kW (86 PS; 84 bhp) at 5,800 rpm	119 N⋅m (88 lb⋅ft) at 4,000 rpm
1.5	1986–90	flat-4	1,490 cc (90.9 cu in)	2 twin-choke carburettors	77 kW (105 PS; 103 bhp) at 5,800 rpm	133 N⋅m (98 lb⋅ft) at 4,000 rpm
1.7 IE cat	1988–90	flat-4	1,712 cc (104.5 cu in)	3.1 LE Jetronic EFI	77 kW (105 PS; 103 bhp) at 5,500 rpm	145 N⋅m (107 lb⋅ft) at 4,500 rpm
1.7 IE	1988–90	flat-4	1,712 cc (104.5 cu in)	3.1 LE Jetronic EFI	81 kW (110 PS; 109 bhp) at 5,800 rpm	151 N⋅m (111 lb⋅ft) at 4,500 rpm
1.7 cat	1986–88	flat-4	1,712 cc (104.5 cu in)	2 twin-choke carburettors	84 kW (114 PS; 113 bhp) at 5,800 rpm	143 N⋅m (105 lb⋅ft) at 3,500 rpm
1.7	1986–90	flat-4	1,712 cc (104.5 cu in)	2 twin-choke carburettors	87 kW (118 PS; 117 bhp) at 5,800 rpm	147 N⋅m (108 lb⋅ft) at 3,500 rpm
Diesel engines
1.8 TD	1986–90	straight-3	1,779 cc (108.6 cu in)	injection pump, KKK 14 turbocharger	53 kW (72 PS; 71 bhp) at 4,000 rpm	153 N⋅m; 113 lb⋅ft at 2,400 rpm

== Second series (1990–1995) ==
The 33 was given a more extensive facelift in the end of 1989, the Series II or 'Nuova' 33 (Type 907), which went on sale in January 1990. This featured a revised interior, the introduction of fuel injection, the 1.7 litre engine upgraded to include a 137 PS (101 kW; 135 hp) 16 valve version, and a heavily restyled front and rear ends, in line with the new Alfa "family look" established by the flagship 164. The part-time four-wheel drive version (33 4x4) was joined by a version with permanent four-wheel drive, called the Permanent 4 and only offered on the most powerful, 16-valve version. The Permanent 4 received Recaro seats in front and a Nardi steering wheel, while providing better handling without the torque steer present in the front-wheel drive model. This model was renamed the Q4 starting from 1992. Late production 33s also do not suffer from the rust problems of their ancestors, as their frames are galvanized in the manner Alfa Romeo introduced with the 164.

The wagon was facelifted a little after the saloon, receiving darker versions of the 1986 (facelift) taillights and a curvier rear bumper. The estate was now sold as the Sport Wagon in most markets (no longer "Giardinetta"), including Italy. In mid-1992, as required by the recent introduction of the Euro 1 emissions requirements, uncatalyzed models were either discontinued or only built for certain export markets with laxer standards. In May 1992 the 1.8 TD was accordingly updated to become the 1.8 TD Eco, but it was discontinued midway through 1993.

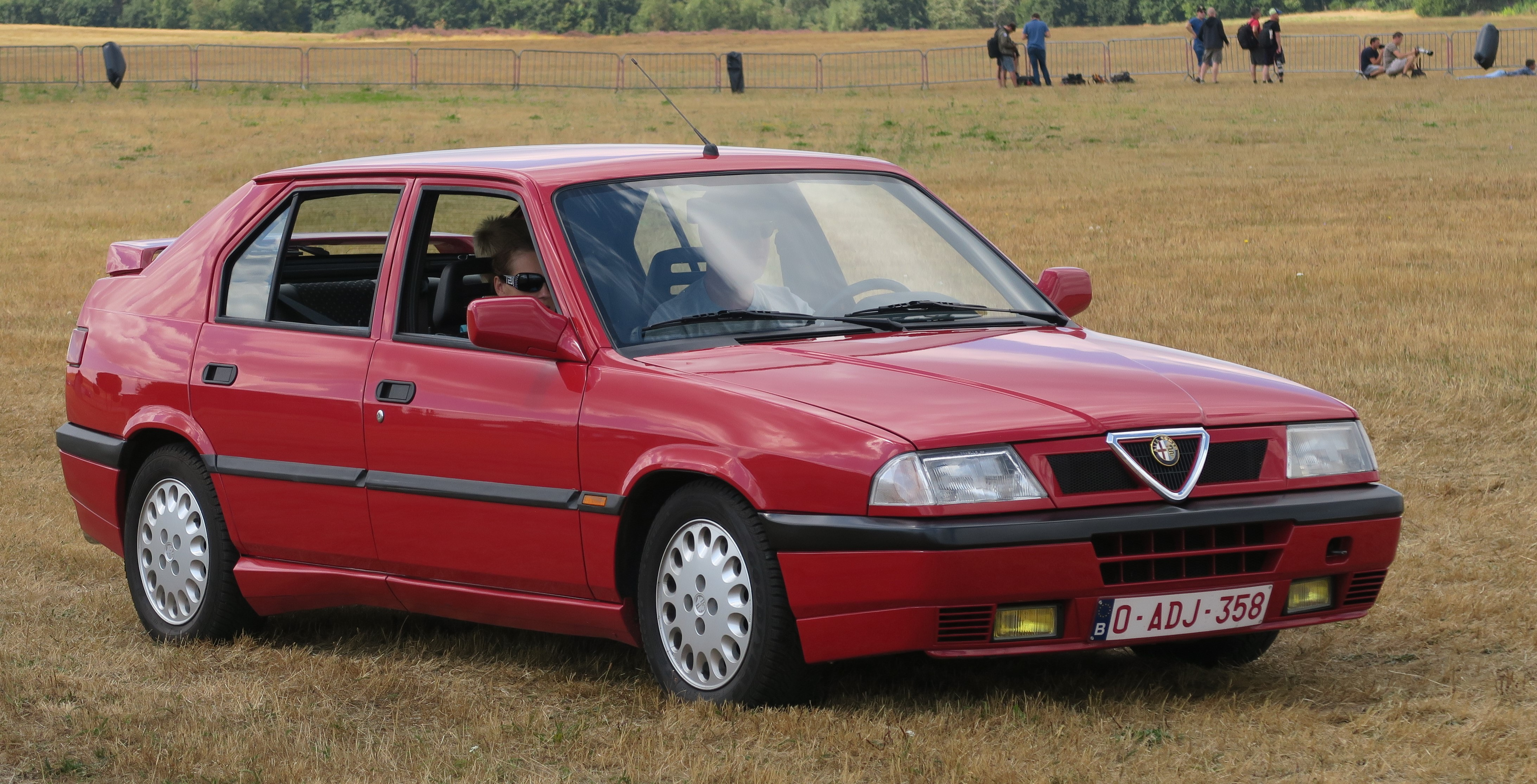
Alfa Romeo 33 (Series II)

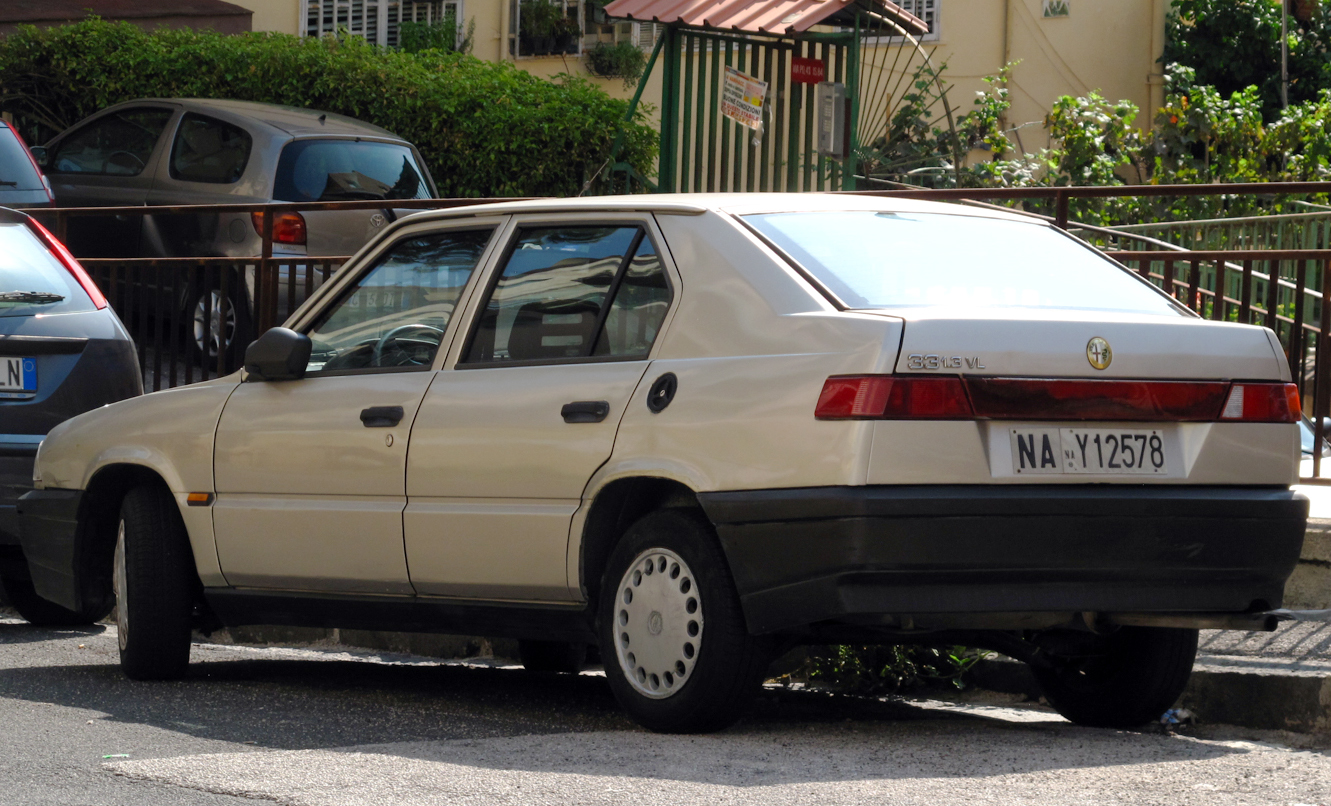
Alfa Romeo 33 1.3 VL (Series II; rear view)

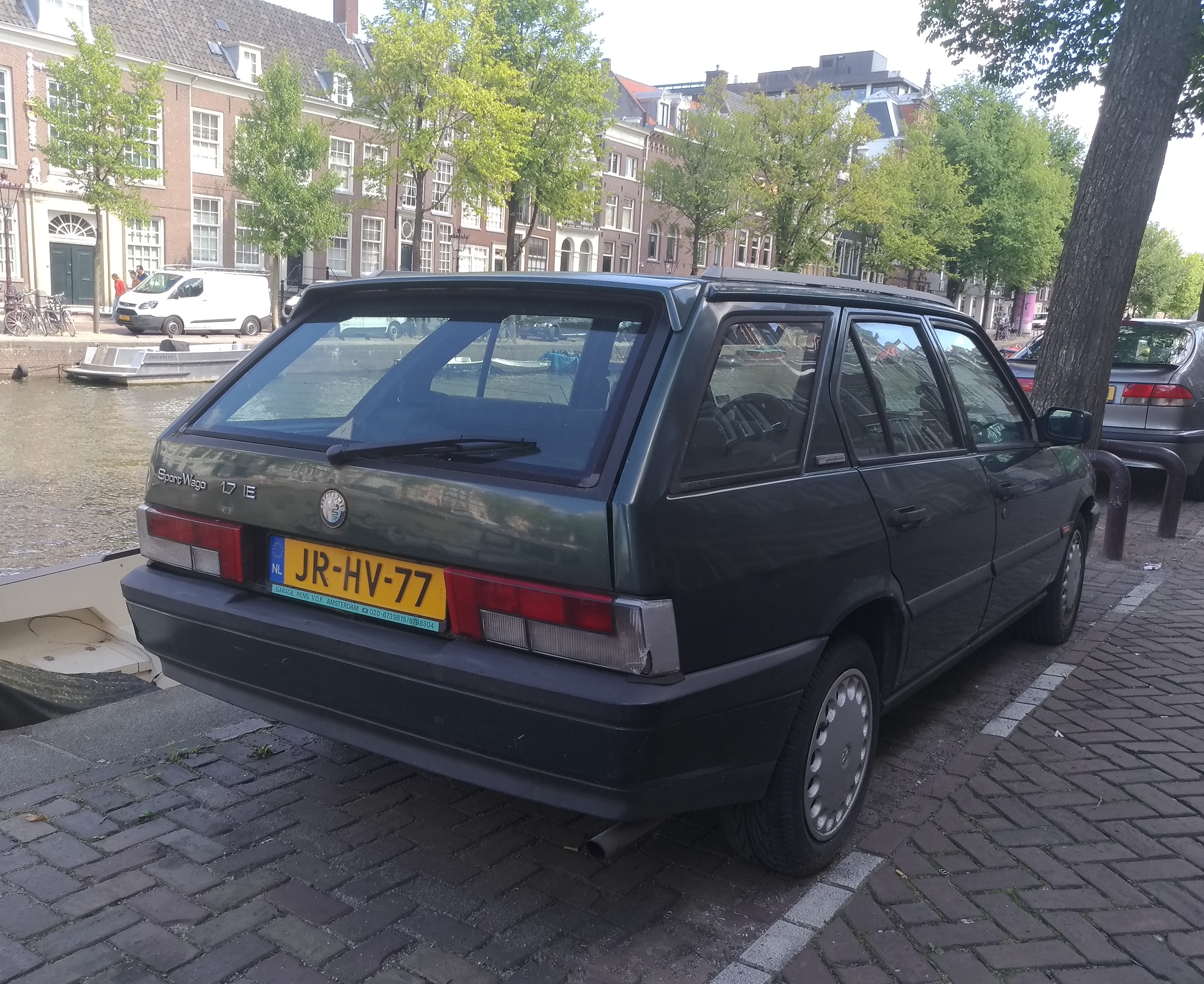
Second series Sport Wagon; rear view

=== Engines ===
Engine	Type	Displacement	Fuel system	Power	Torque	Notes
Petrol engines
1.2	flat-4	1,186 cc (72.4 cu in)	two twin carburettors	57 kW (77 PS; 76 bhp) at 6000 rpm	95 N⋅m (70 lb⋅ft) at 4500 rpm	Greece; 1990–1993
1.3	flat-4	1,351 cc (82.4 cu in)	two twin Weber carburettors	63–66 kW (86–90 PS; 84–89 bhp) at 6000 rpm	119–122 N⋅m (88–90 lb⋅ft) at 4500 rpm	
1.3 IE	flat-4	1,351 cc (82.4 cu in)	Marelli IAW, on some markets Bosch Jetronic before April 1992	64–66 kW (87–90 PS; 86–89 bhp) at 6000 rpm	109 N⋅m (80 lb⋅ft) at 4500 rpm	
1.5	flat-4	1,490 cc (91 cu in)	two twin DRLA40 carburettors	77 kW (105 PS; 103 bhp) at 6000 rpm	133 N⋅m (98 lb⋅ft) at 4500 rpm	1990–1992
1.5 IE	flat-4	1,490 cc (91 cu in)	Bosch L3-1 Jetronic	77 kW (105 PS; 103 bhp) at 6000 rpm	126 N⋅m (93 lb⋅ft) at 4500 rpm	
1.5 IE cat	flat-4	1,490 cc (91 cu in)	Bosch LE3 Jetronic before April 1992, Bosch Motronic MP3.1 after	71 kW (97 PS; 96 bhp) at 6000 rpm	125 N⋅m (92 lb⋅ft) at 4500 rpm	1992–1995
1.7 IE	flat-4	1,712 cc (104.5 cu in)	Bosch LE3 Jetronic before April 1992, Bosch Motronic MP3.1 from April 1992	81 kW (110 PS; 109 bhp) at 5800 rpm	153 N⋅m (113 lb⋅ft) at 4500 rpm	
1.7 IE cat	flat-4	1,712 cc (104.5 cu in)	Bosch LE3 Jetronic before April 1992, Bosch Motronic MP3.1 from April 1992	79 kW (107 PS; 106 bhp) at 5800 rpm	149 N⋅m (110 lb⋅ft) at 4500 rpm	
1.7 IE 16V	flat-4	1,712 cc (104.5 cu in)	Bosch Motronic ML4.1	98–101 kW (133–137 PS; 131–135 bhp) at 6500 rpm	157–161 N⋅m (116–119 lb⋅ft) at 4600 rpm	
1.7 IE 16V cat	flat-4	1,712 cc (104.5 cu in)	Bosch Motronic ML4.1	95–97 kW (129–132 PS; 127–130 bhp) at 6500 rpm	151–155 N⋅m (111–114 lb⋅ft) at 4600 rpm	
Diesel engines
1.8 TD i	straight-3	1,779 cc (108.6 cu in)	turbocharger and intercooler (VM HRT 392)	62 kW (84 PS; 83 bhp) at 4200 rpm	178 N⋅m (131 lbf⋅ft) at 2400 rpm	1990–1993 ("Eco" from May 1992)

== Z33 Free Time prototype ==
Zagato made a tall-bodied three-door prototype, a Compact MPV anticipating the Renault Scénic by over a decade. Called the "Z33 Free Time" this was shown at the 1984 Geneva Motor Show, but the project remained a single prototype. The "Free Time" was no longer than the regular "33" at just under 4 metres (157 in) and retained most of its driving characteristics, but with greatly increased interior space. The tiny six-seater was based on the chassis of the 33 but was visually more related to the Giulietta.

== Hybrid version prototype ==
The 33 1.5 Sport Wagon was chosen by Alfa Romeo to test the possibility of creating a hybrid vehicle. Standard 1.5 boxer engine was combined with three-phase asynchronous electric motor (16 hp). The electric motor was coupled with gearbox via a toothed belt and therefore the car could move from the electric motor only, from the petrol engine only or - in the sense of hybrid propulsion - from both. The hybrid car could go 5 km on electric power only, in speeds up to 60 km/h. Changes to the body were minimal and the car weight was increased by 150 kg (110 batteries, 20 engine and 10 for power electronics). 3 vehicles were built.
