= Ermanno Cressoni =

Italian car designer

Ermanno Cressoni (22 July 1939 in Milan, Italy – 30 June 2005 in Milan, Italy) was an Italian car designer who worked for both Alfa Romeo and Fiat during his career. He designed or directed the design of a number of significant cars, such as the Alfa Romeo 75 and the Fiat Coupe (in collaboration with Chris Bangle). He was often referred to as "Arch". He died in Milan, Italy in June 2005, after battling cancer for over a year.

== Career ==
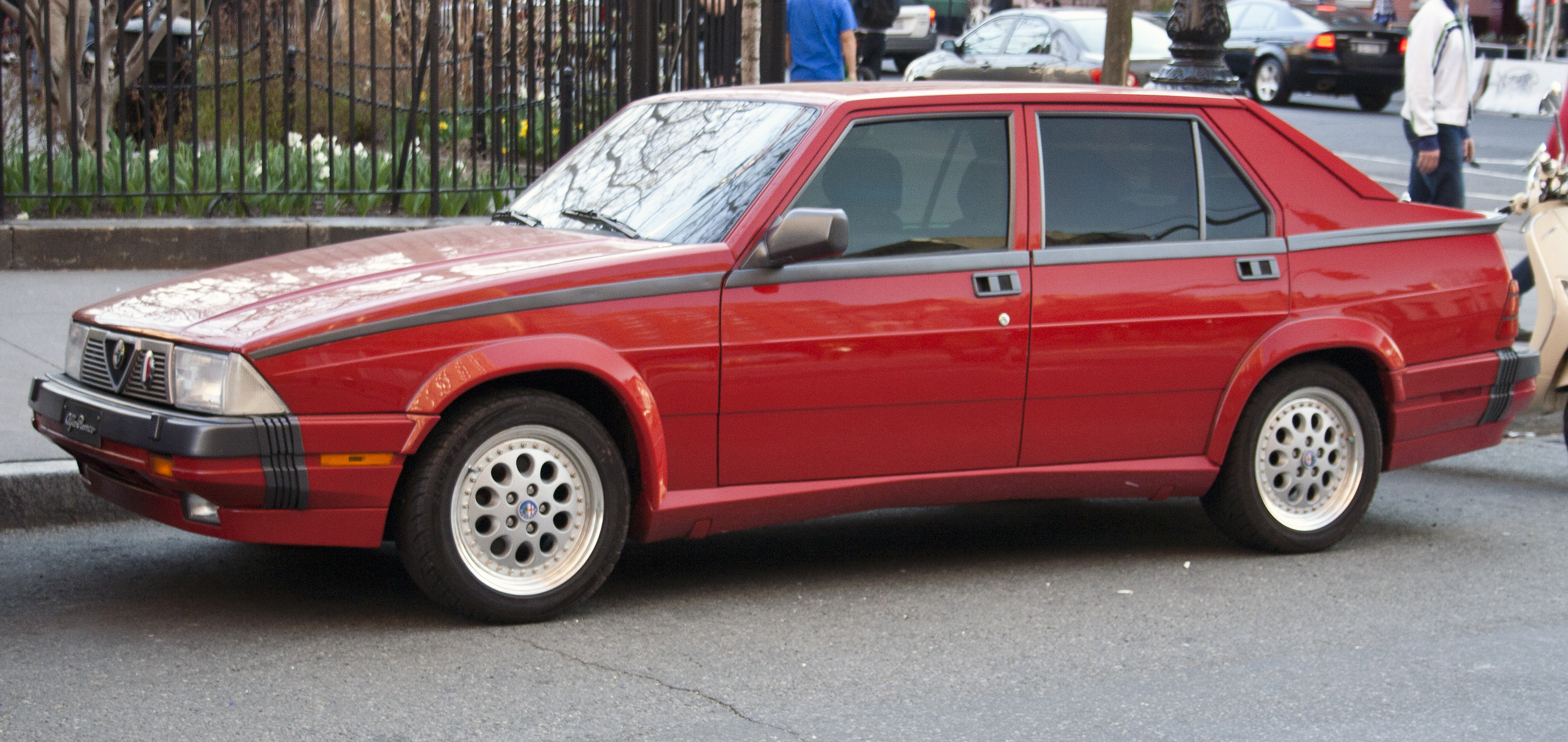
Alfa Romeo Milano (US version of the 75), an example of Cressoni's "La Linea" design style

Cressoni was director of Centro Stile Alfa Romeo where he designed and oversaw a wide range of cars including the Alfa Romeo Alfetta saloon (1972), and from the late 1970s his 'La Linea' sharp edged designs featured in the Giulietta (1977), Alfa Romeo 33 (1983), Alfa Romeo 75 (1985). In 1985, Cressoni patented a design for a centre console that featured extra storage space as a result of a U-shaped hand brake and was awarded a US patent (number 4,818,008) in 1989.

After Fiat acquired Alfa Romeo in 1986, he became director of Centro Stile Fiat where he directed the team that produced:

- Fiat Cinquecento (1991)
- Fiat Coupé (1993)
- Fiat Barchetta (1995)
- Fiat Bravo (1995)

Many of his staff from Alfa Romeo and Centro Stile Fiat became influential designers in their own right, including Chris Bangle, Walter de Silva and Andreas Zapatinas.
