= Götzis =

- Municipality
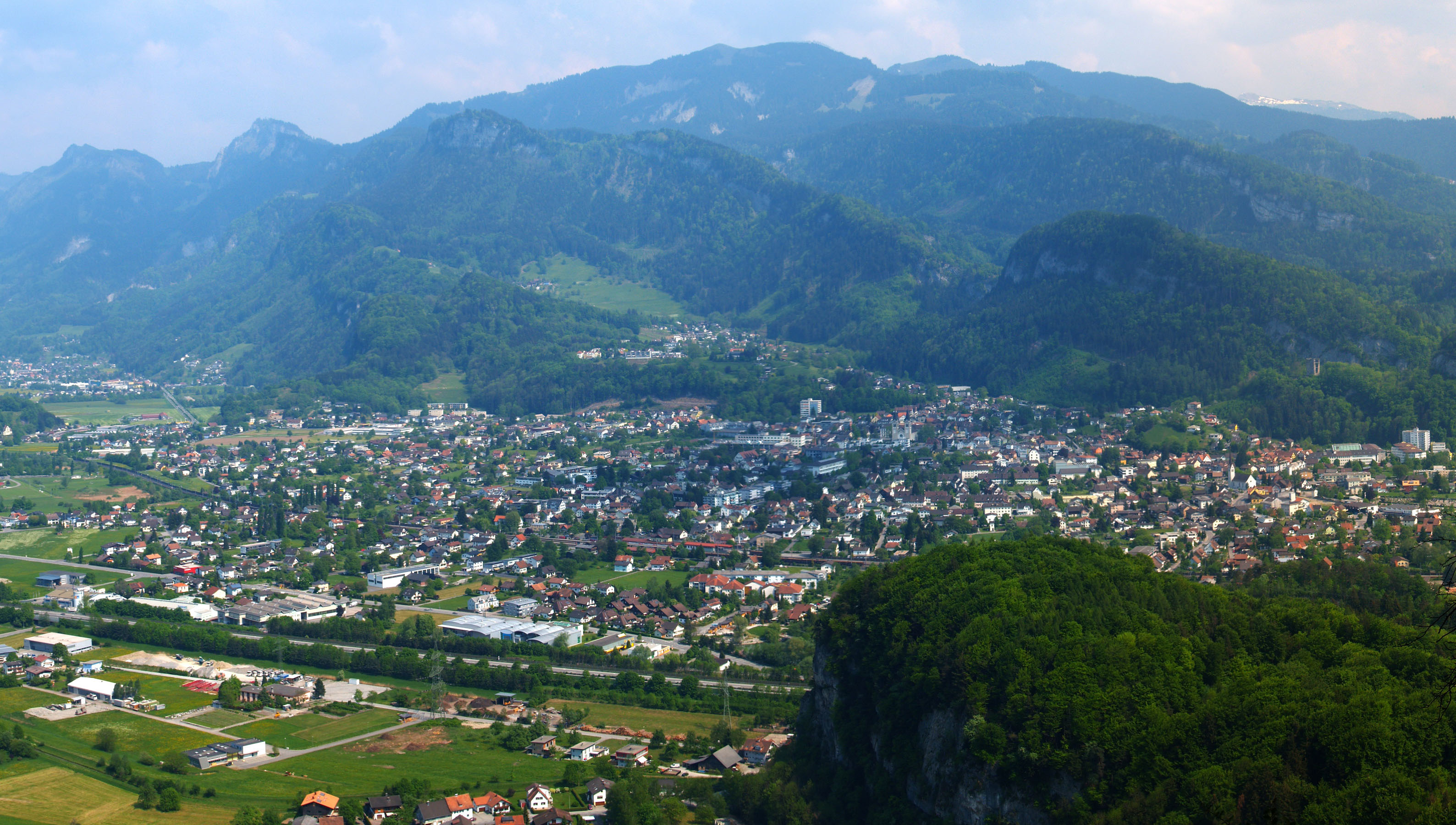
- Götzis

- Coat of arms

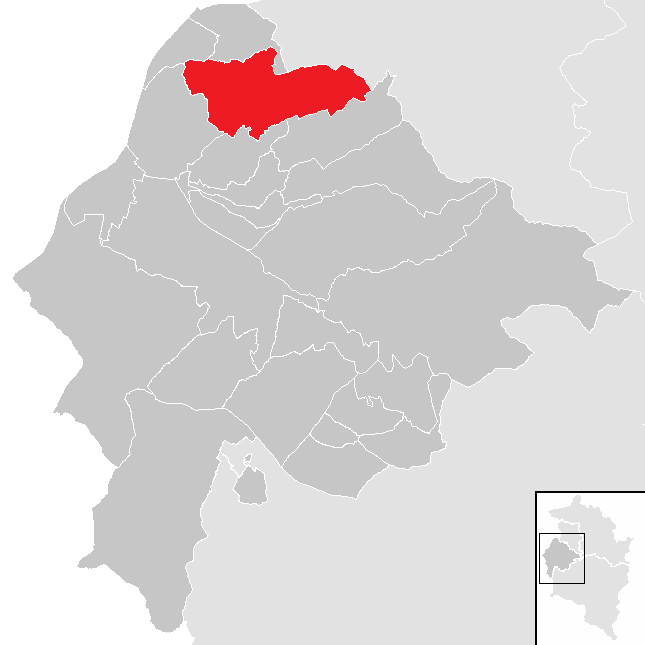
- Location in the district

- Location within Austria
- Coordinates: 47°19′59″N 09°38′00″E
- Country: Austria
- State: Vorarlberg
- District: Feldkirch

Government
  - Mayor: Christian Loacker (ÖVP)

Area
  - Total: 14.64 km^{2} (5.65 sq mi)
- Elevation: 448 m (1,470 ft)

Population (2018-01-01)
  - Total: 11,473
  - Density: 783.7/km^{2} (2,030/sq mi)
- Time zone: UTC+1 (CET)
  - Summer (DST): UTC+2 (CEST)
- Postal code: 6840
- Area code: 05523
- Vehicle registration: FK
- Website: www.goetzis.at

Götzis is a town in the western Austrian state of Vorarlberg. The Alpine Rhine valley municipality belongs to the district of Feldkirch.

== Population ==
Historical population
Year	Pop.	±%
1869	2,534	—
1880	2,701	+6.6%
1890	2,982	+10.4%
1900	3,370	+13.0%
1910	4,013	+19.1%
1923	3,773	−6.0%
1934	4,052	+7.4%
1939	4,171	+2.9%
1951	5,435	+30.3%
1961	7,034	+29.4%
1971	8,292	+17.9%
1981	8,735	+5.3%
1991	9,512	+8.9%
2001	10,097	+6.2%
2011	10,627	+5.2%

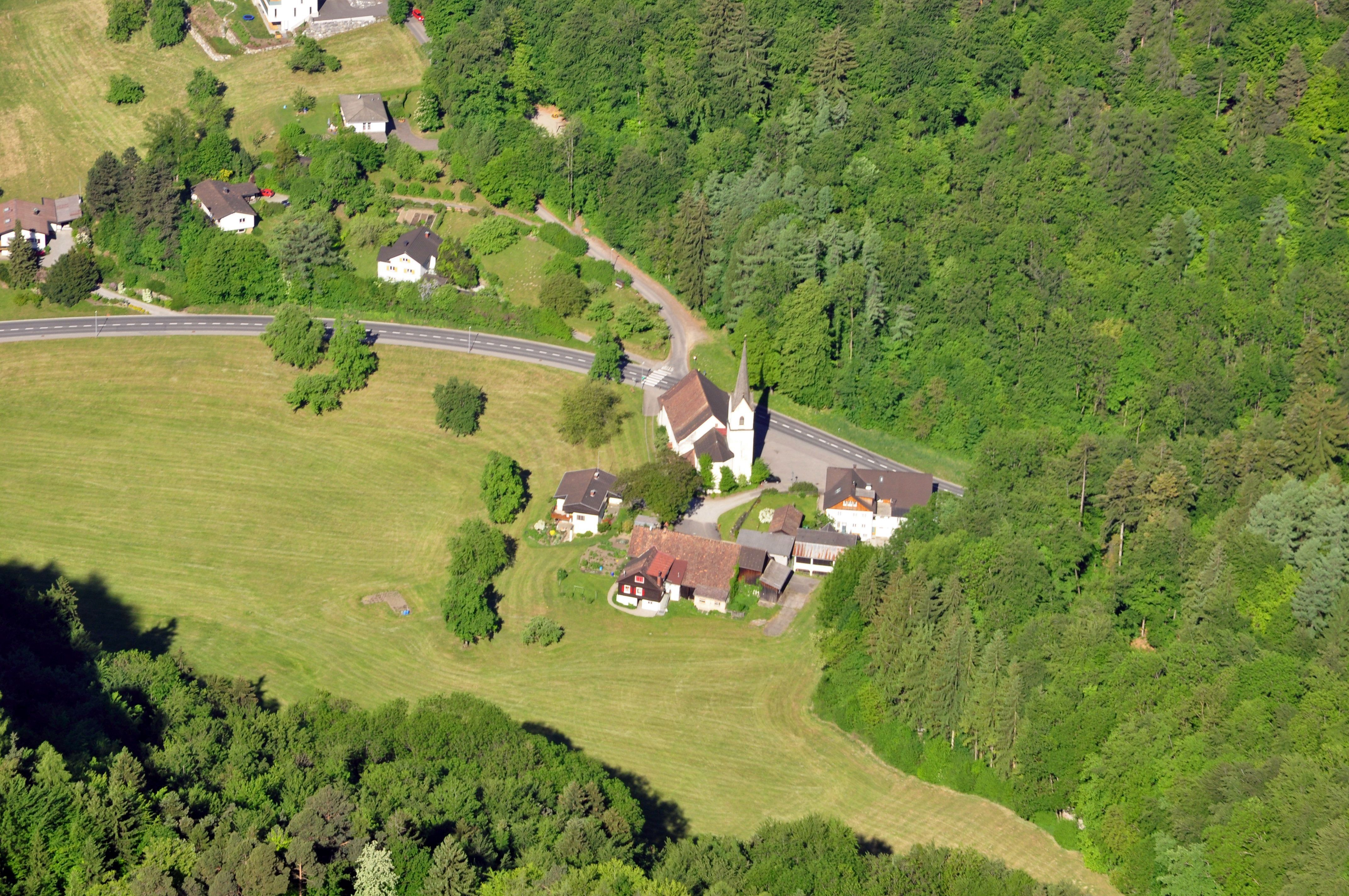
Götzis seen from the air.

== Events ==
The town is well known for its annual hypo-combined events meeting, the so-called Hypo-Meeting, where some of the world's leading decathletes and heptathletes gather in the Mösle stadium. Past winners at Götzis include former decathlon world record holder, Olympic and world champion Roman Šebrle (who achieved the record at the 2001 Götzis meeting), world champion Bryan Clay and Olympic champion Carolina Klüft.

== Notable people ==
- Hotelier Johannes Baur was born in Götzis in 1795.
- The singer Elfi Graf (born 1952) lives in Götzis.
- Michael Kopf (born 1948), racing driver.
- Jürgen Loacker (born 1974), bobsledder.

== Transport ==
Götzis railway station is on the main west–east route connecting the Vorarlberg railway line (Vorarlbergbahn) in the directions of Bregenz and Feldkirch/Bludenz, continuing eastward over the Arlberg Railway line to Innsbruck and beyond. The railway station is served by the S1 and R5 services of Vorarlberg S-Bahn and Regional-Express (REX 1) trains.
