= Michael Kopf =

Austrian racing driver (born 1948)

- Nationality: (Austria) Austrian
- Born: 20 December 1948 (age 77) Götzis, Austria
- Years active: 1984–1987
- Former teams: MK Racing Team Austria
- Starts: 7

Michael Kopf (born 20 December 1948) in Götzis) is a former Austrian racing driver. He began his career in 1967 in a Steyr-Puch 650 TR. He participated in various national and international championships. From 1984 to 1987, Kopf drove his Alfa GTV 6 and Alfa 75 Turbo 7 DTM races.

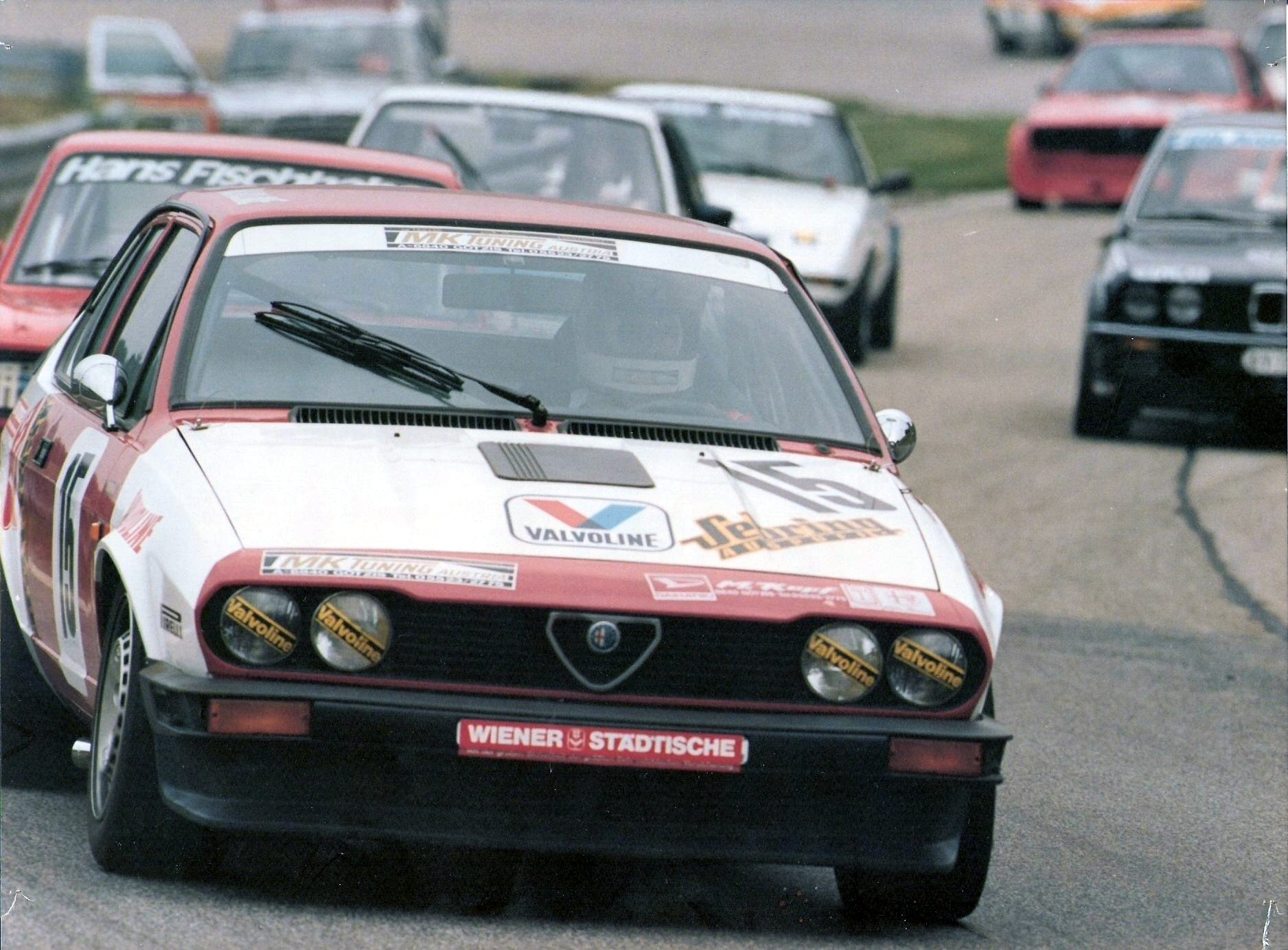
Michael Kopf and Alfa GTV 6 Hockenheimring 1984

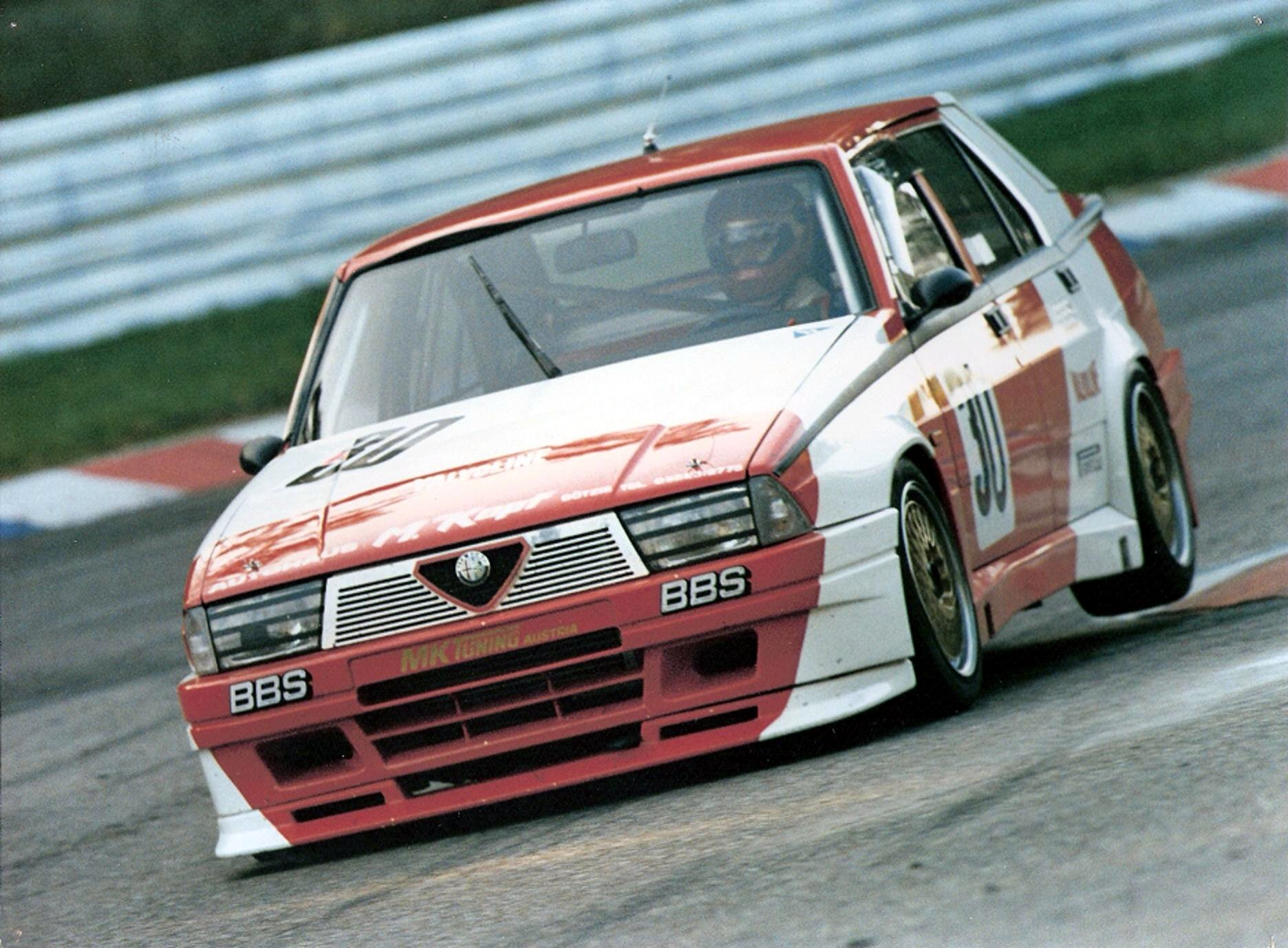
Michael Kopf and Alfa 75 Turbo Nürburgring 1986
