= Alfa Romeo Giulietta (1977) =

Small executive saloon car

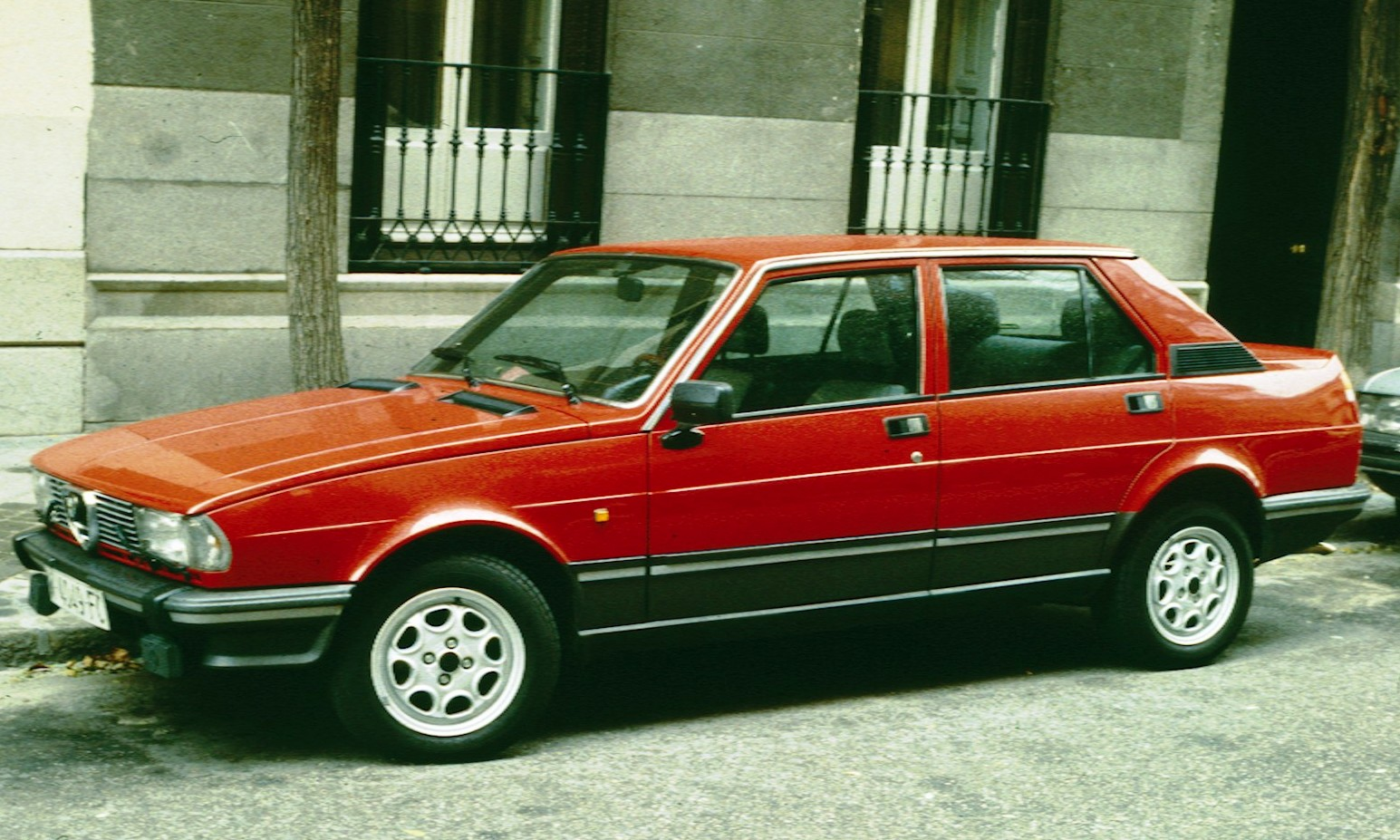
- Second series Alfa Romeo Giulietta (1981–1983)

Overview
- Manufacturer: Alfa Romeo
- Also called: Alfa Romeo Giulietta Nuova; Alfa Romeo Nuova Giulietta; Alfa Romeo New Giulietta
- Production: November 1977–1985
- Assembly: Italy: Arese Plant, Lombardy
- Designer: Ermanno Cressoni

Body and chassis
- Class: Midsize car (D)
- Body style: 4-door saloon
- Layout: Front-engine, rear-wheel-drive
- Related: Alfa Romeo Alfetta

Powertrain
- Engine: petrol: 1357 cc Twin Cam I4; 1570 cc Twin Cam I4; 1779 cc Twin Cam I4; 1962 cc Twin Cam I4; 1962 cc Twin Cam turbo I4; diesel: 1995 cc VM HR488 turbo I4
- Transmission: 5-speed manual

Dimensions
- Wheelbase: 2,510 mm (98.8 in)
- Length: 4,210 mm (165.7 in)
- Width: 1,650 mm (65.0 in)
- Height: 1,400 mm (55.1 in)
- Kerb weight: 1,100–1,140 kg (2,430–2,510 lb)

Chronology
- Predecessor: Alfa Romeo Giulia (105)
- Successor: Alfa Romeo 75

The Alfa Romeo Giulietta (Type 116) is a small executive saloon car manufactured by Italian car maker Alfa Romeo from 1977 to 1985. The car was introduced in November 1977 and while it took its name from the original Giulietta of 1954 to 1965, it was a new design based on the Alfa Romeo Alfetta chassis (including its rear mounted transaxle). The Giulietta went through two facelifts, the first in 1981 and the second one in 1983. All Giuliettas used 5-speed manual transmissions.

While it was a conventional three-box saloon/sedan body style, a defining point of difference was at the rear, where there was a short boot, and a small aerodynamic spoiler, integrated into the body. The Giulietta was only offered in saloon form, but there were several estate/station wagon conversions made. First out was Moretti, whose conversion appeared in the first half of 1978.

== History ==
=== First series ===
The Giulietta was launched in November 1977. Two models were available: Giulietta 1.3, with an oversquare 95 PS (70 kW) 1357 cc engine, and Giulietta 1.6, with a 109 PS (80 kW) 1570 cc engine, both Alfa Romeo Twin Cam inline-fours fed by two twin-choke carburettors.

In April 1979, just under two years later, Giulietta 1.8 with a 122 PS (90 kW) 1779 cc engine was added, and in May of the following year the Giulietta Super with a 2-litre engine (1962 cc, 130 PS or 96 kW) appeared. The Giulietta was unusual in that the tachometer rotated counter-clockwise, meeting the speedometer needle at the top, rather than the usual clockwise movement.

=== Second series ===
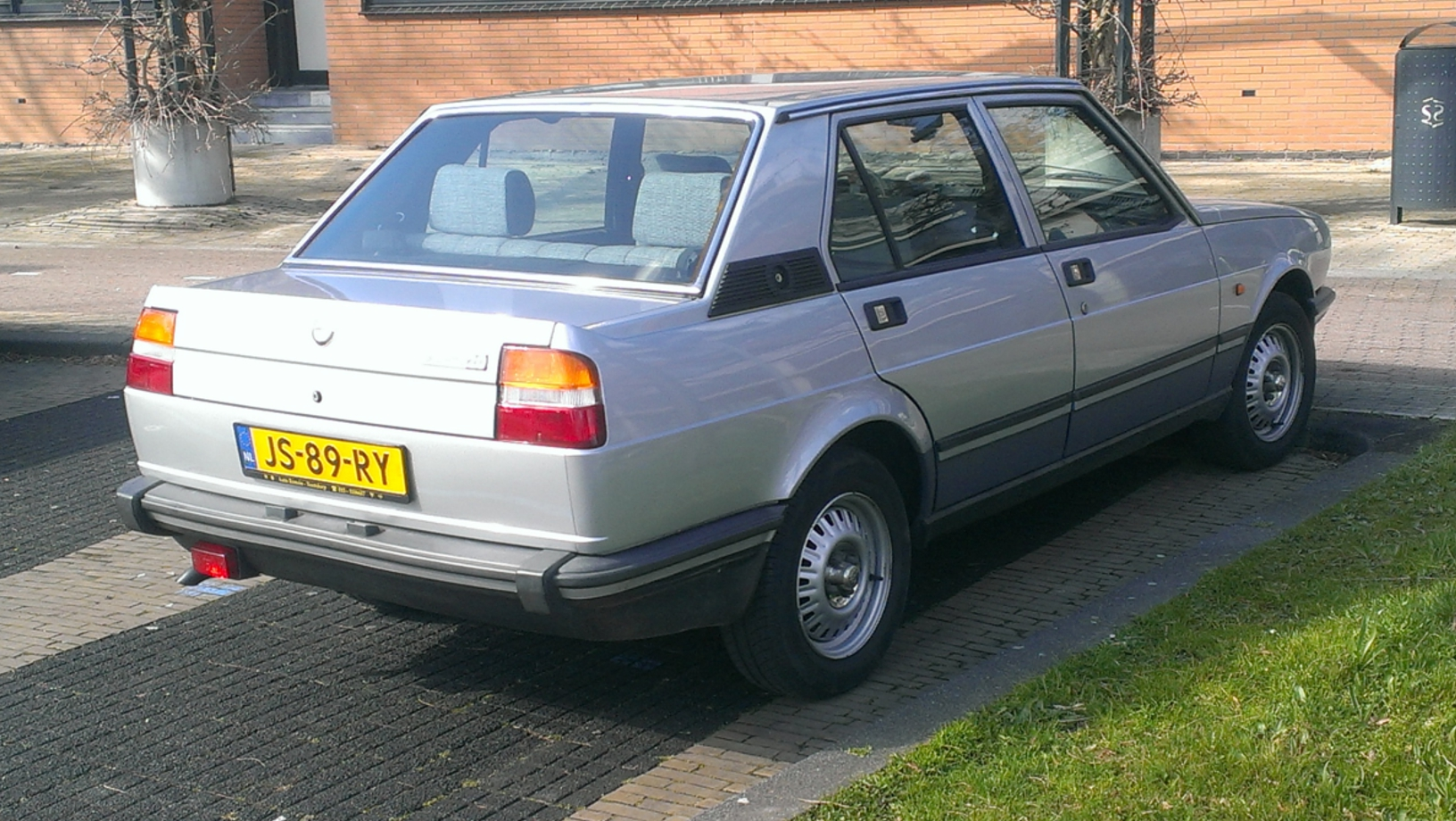
1983 Alfa Romeo Giulietta 2.0 rear

In summer of 1981, the Giulietta received a minor facelift, externally and internally, while the engines remained the same. The car got plastic protection around the lower body, while interior modifications included a new steering wheel and new seats. The instrument panel and the centre armrest were also modified.

The Autodelta-produced Giulietta 2.0 Turbo Autodelta (175 PS) was introduced at the 1982 Paris motor show. This special version had a turbocharged 1,962 cc engine. The production Giulietta Turbodelta version had 170 PS (125 kW; 168 hp) and a KKK turbocharger coupled with two double-barrel Weber carburettors. All turbo versions were black with red interior; only 361 were produced. In the same year, the petrol-engined Giulietta 2.0 Ti and the Giulietta Turbodiesel (VM) 1995 cc version with 82 PS (60 kW; 81 hp) were also introduced, going on sale in early 1983.

In 1982, Alfetta and Giulietta turbodiesels achieved seven world speed records over 5/10/25/50 thousand kilometres and 5/10/25 thousand miles at Nardò (Lecce). While one of the quickest diesels in its category at the time, the Giulietta was rather costly and suffered from a very forward weight distribution (56.9 per cent over the front wheels).

=== Third series ===
In late 1983, the "84" Giulietta (Series 3) was presented, with minor differences in appearance, bumpers were redesigned and the dashboard was significantly redesigned, the instruments changed slightly and the rear seat in some versions changed its form. Mechanically it was basically the same, with minor modifications to the brake booster and inlet manifold on some versions.

The largest international market for the Giulietta was South Africa, where a very successful TV advertising campaign by Alfa Romeo produced good sales between 1981 and 1984. Central to this campaign was emphasis of the Giulietta's new 'aerodynamic' line, which was carried over to the 75, and then the 33. The Giulietta was the 'last hurrah' for Alfa in South Africa before the appearance of the 164 and 156 models in the 1990s

In 1985, after around 380,000 Giuliettas had been built, it was replaced by the Alfa Romeo 75, which used much of the Alfetta/Giulietta underpinnings.

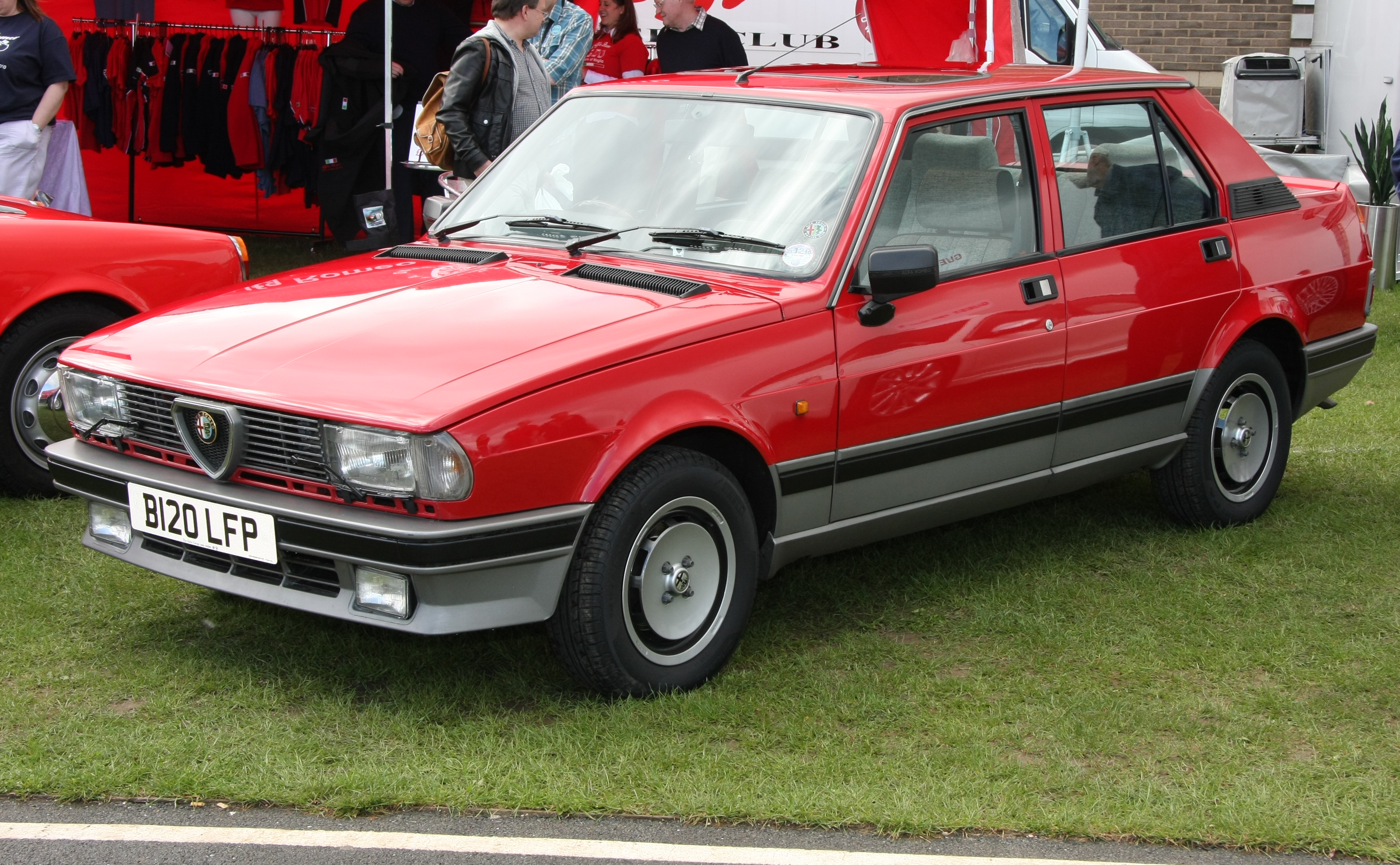
1984 Alfa Romeo Giulietta 2.0 RS

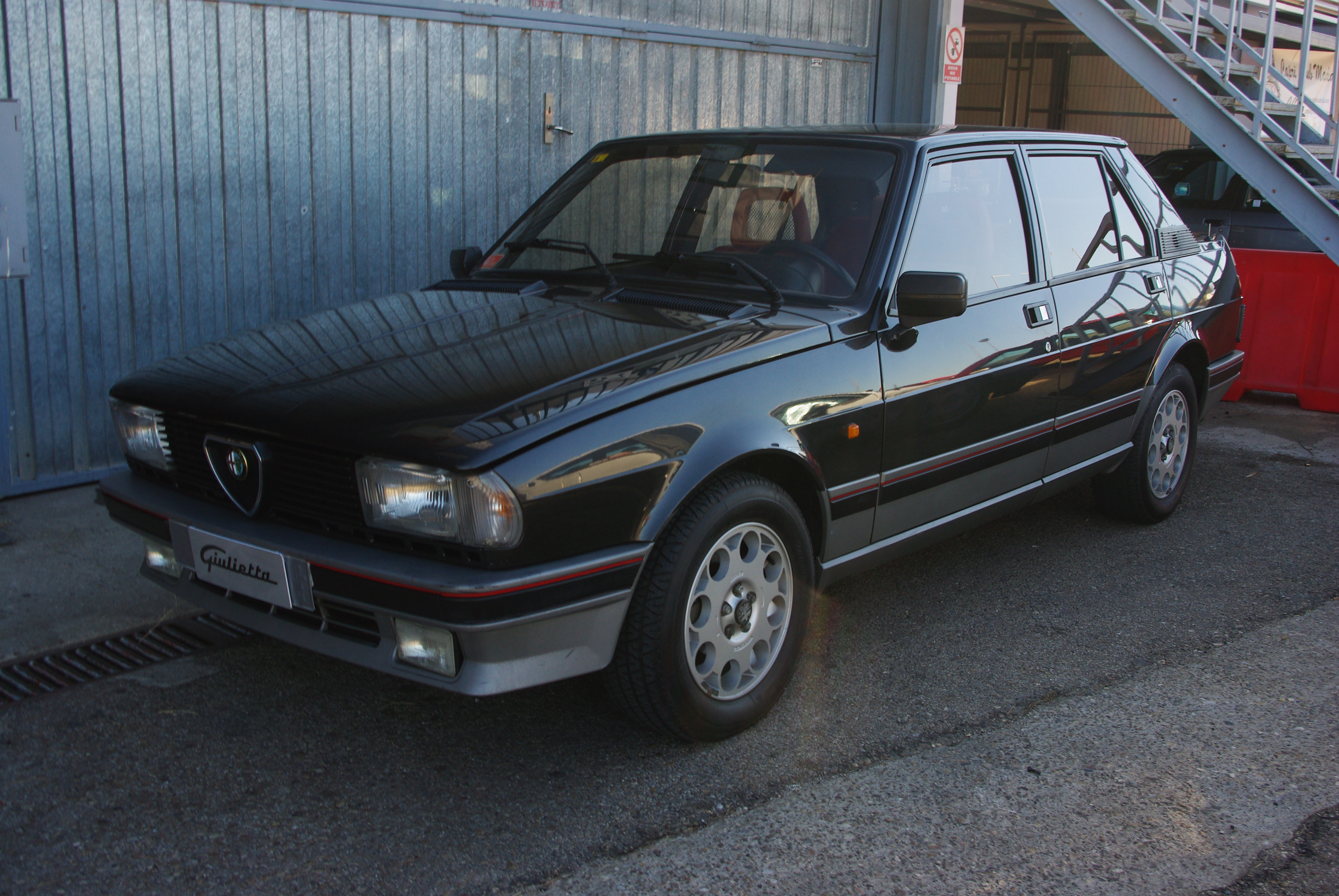
One of the 361 Giulietta Turbodeltas

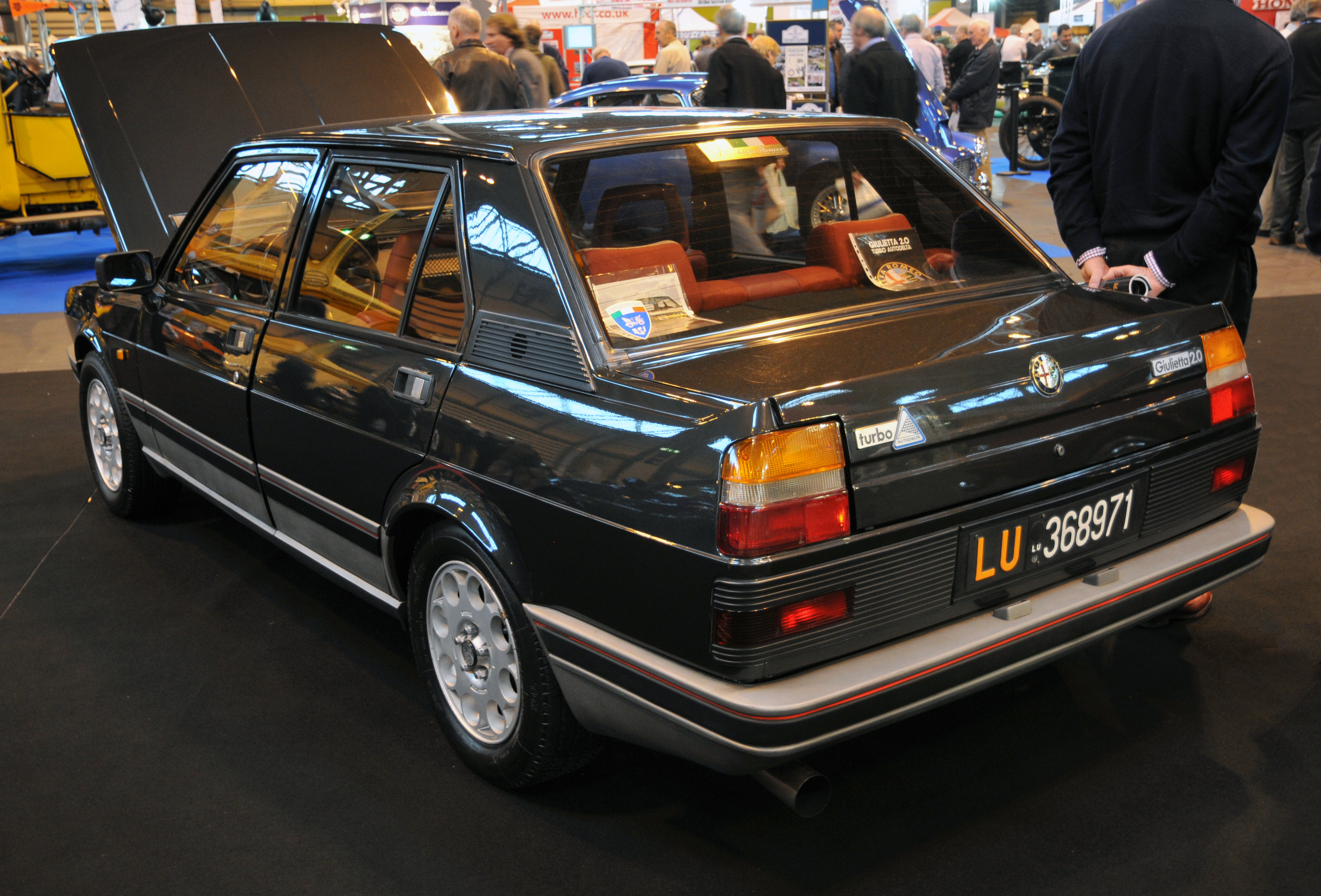
Rear view of a Giulietta Turbodelta

== Engines ==
| Model | Engine | Displacement | Power | Torque | Top speed | 0–100 km/h (0–62 mph) | Produced |
|---|---|---|---|---|---|---|---|
| 1.3 | DOHC I4 | 1357 cc | 95 PS (70 kW; 94 hp) at 6,000 rpm | 121 N⋅m (89 lb⋅ft) at 4,500 rpm | 165 km/h (103 mph) | 12.7 s | 1977–1983 |
| 1.6 | DOHC I4 | 1570 cc | 109 PS (80 kW; 108 hp) at 5,600 rpm | 143 N⋅m (105 lb⋅ft) at 4,300 rpm | 175 km/h (109 mph) | 11.3 s | 1977–1985 |
| 1.8 | DOHC I4 | 1779 cc | 122 PS (90 kW; 120 hp) at 5,300 rpm | 167 N⋅m (123 lb⋅ft) at 4,000 rpm | 180 km/h (110 mph) | 9.6 s | 1979–1985 |
| 2.0 | DOHC I4 | 1962 cc | 130 PS (96 kW; 128 hp) at 5,400 rpm | 178 N⋅m (131 lb⋅ft) at 4,000 rpm | 185 km/h (115 mph) | 9.4 s | 1980–1985 |
| Turbodelta | Turbocharged; DOHC I4 | 1962 cc | 170 PS (125 kW; 168 hp) at 5,000 rpm | 283 N⋅m (209 lb⋅ft) at 3,500 rpm | 206 km/h (128 mph) | 7.5 s | 1982–1985 |
| Turbodiesel | I4 | 1995 cc | 82 PS (60 kW; 81 hp) at 4,300 rpm | 162 N⋅m (119 lb⋅ft) at 2,300 rpm | 155 km/h (96 mph) | 19.4 s | 1982–1985 |
