= My Summer Car =

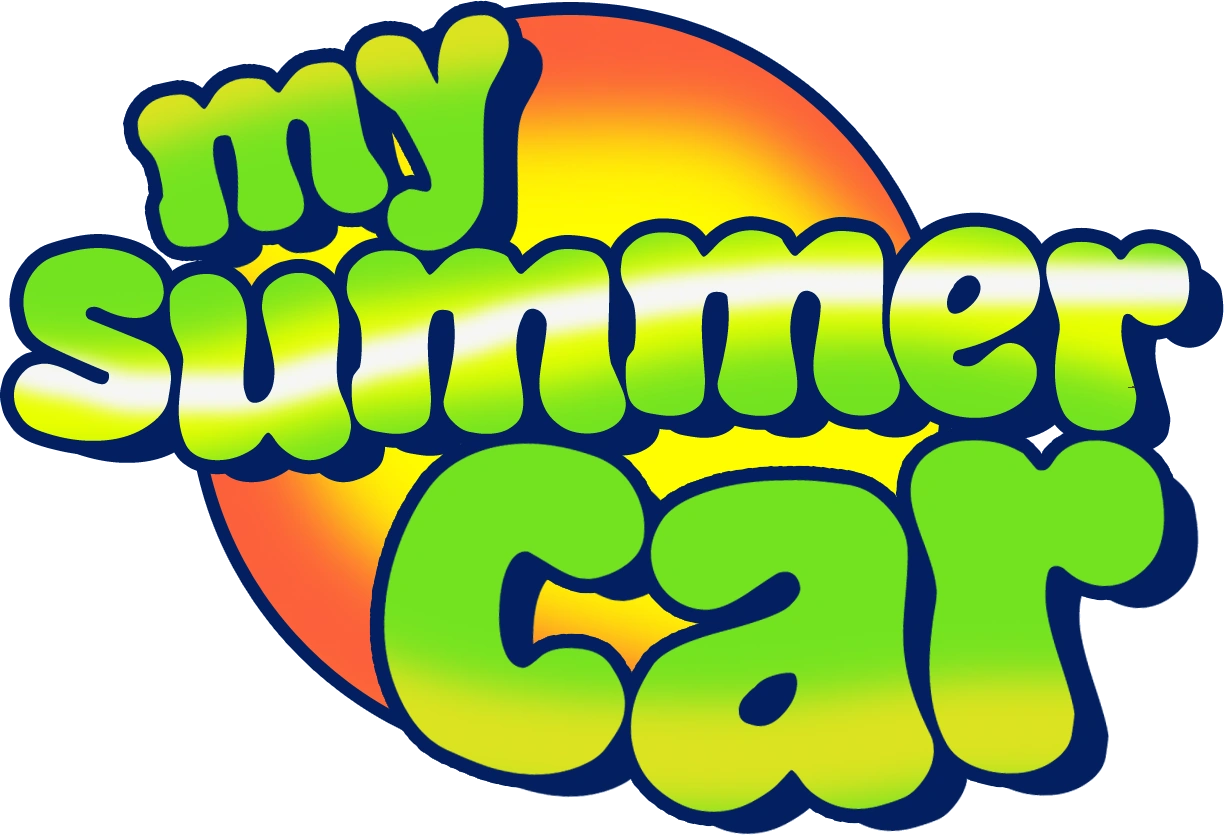
- Developer: Amistech Games
- Publisher: Amistech Games
- Designers: Johannes Rojola; Kaarina Rojola
- Programmer: Johannes Rojola (ToplessGun)
- Artist: Kaarina Rojola
- Composers: Heikki Mustonen; Dr. Vector; Johannes Rojola; Maria Korva; Iloiset Pojat; KTROPR; Juho Tukkinen; NinjaBaka; Martijn Frazer; Olli Hellander; Rami Airola; Wrathrone
- Engine: Unity 5
- Platform: Windows
- Release: 24 October 2016 (Early Access); 8 January 2025 (full version)
- Genres: Vehicle simulation, survival game
- Mode: Single-player

My Summer Car (MSC) is a vehicle simulation game developed and published by Amistech Games. It was released in early access on Steam on 24 October 2016. On 8 January 2025, the indie game was officially released from Early Access.

== Gameplay and setting ==
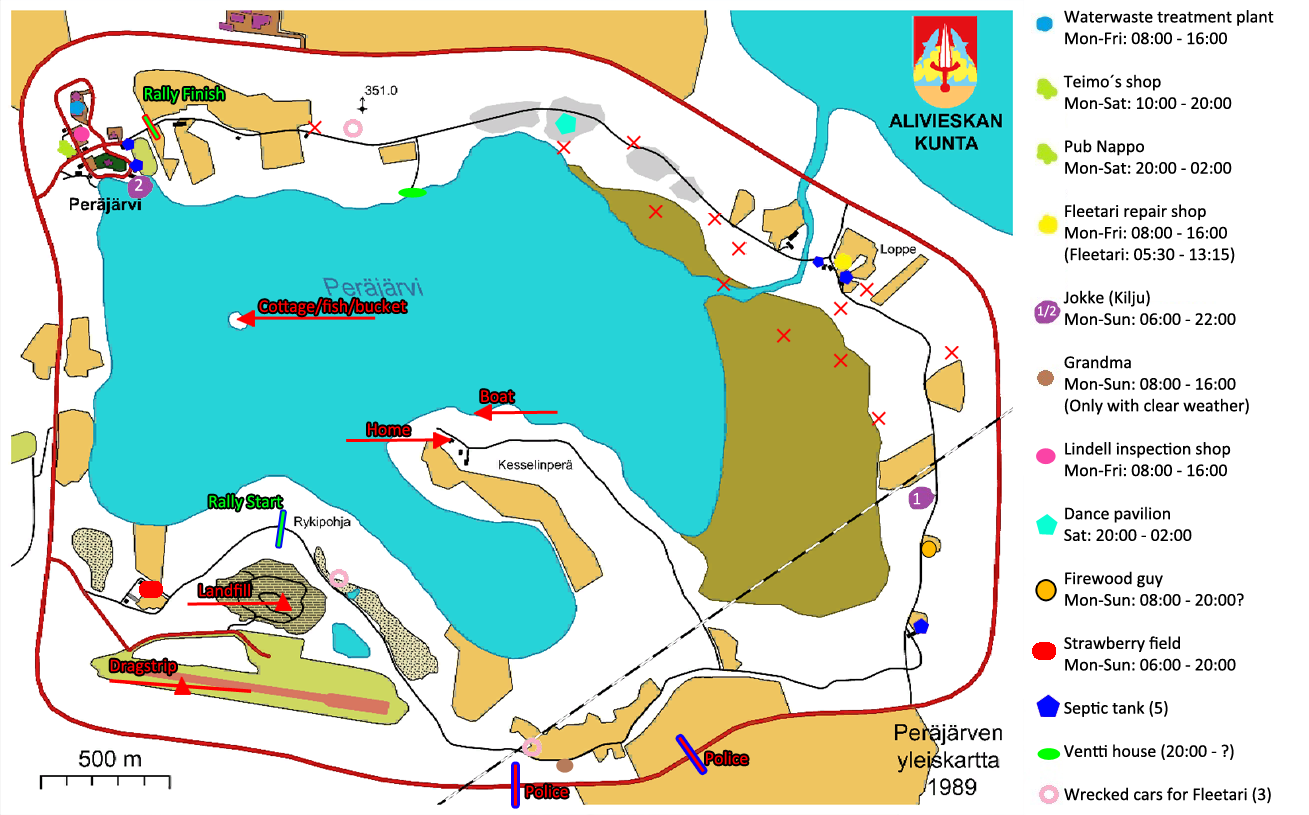
Map of Alivieska; the fictional Finnish region My Summer Car takes place in

My Summer Car is set in the open world fictional area of Alivieska, Finland, centered around a massive lake called Peräjärvi during the summer of 1995. The main character is an 18/19-year-old (depending on what date the player starts their game) who has the family home to himself while his parents are on holiday in Tenerife. The player attempts to assemble, restore, and upgrade a car, the Satsuma AMP (modeled after the Datsun 100A). To do this, the player must use existing car parts inside the garage or obtain crucial parts in different areas, as well as occasionally order accessories from a catalog.

At the start of the game, the car is entirely disassembled, and the player must place each part in its correct location, screwing in the bolts with the correct sized spanners. The player is not given any direction by the game as to how to build the car. While most parts only fit together correctly, it is possible to assemble the car incorrectly by leaving out or improperly placing parts such as an engine gasket or a bolt. Failing to assemble the car properly can lead to vehicle failure if the car is driven. In addition to assembly, the player must provide the car with gasoline, motor oil, radiator coolant, and brake fluid. These fluids must also be topped up periodically and the engine oil replaced after a certain amount of time for the car to function correctly.

In addition to building the vehicle, the player must address the various survival aspects of the game, such as balancing hunger, thirst, fatigue, urine, stress, and dirtiness. To take care of his needs, the player can buy food, beverages, and other supplies from an in-game store. The player may also use the facilities at his house, such as the sink, shower, sauna, toilet, and bed. The player's needs can also be addressed through swimming in the lake, drinking alcohol, smoking, or successfully performing tasks related to the completion of the car. For entertainment, the player may watch television or play minigames on a purchasable computer.

To earn money for car parts, fuel, and shopping at the store, the player can perform various side-tasks for people living around the area. The tasks are performed either using materials from the player's property, or with the various pre-assembled vehicles that the player can access and use. The tasks include taking junk cars to the mechanic, delivering firewood on a tractor-pulled trailer, using a vacuum truck to empty the septic tanks of neighbors, making and selling kilju, picking strawberries in a field, and picking up an intoxicated neighbor from the town pub early in the morning. After the Satsuma passes inspection at the vehicle inspection office, the player can install certain aftermarket parts that enable the player to enter a weekly amateur rally for a chance to win a trophy and prize money.

In addition to these vehicles, there are several other vehicles that the player can obtain in the game. The player has access to a cargo van with a large carrying capacity owned by an alcoholic uncle, a two-stroke moped, and a launch at a nearby dock that allows for travel across the map's lake. The player can borrow a muscle car from the local mechanic while he is servicing the player's vehicle, but the mechanic will dispose of the player's vehicle in a swamp if the muscle car is not returned on time. The player can also win a dilapidated and wasp-infested station wagon from a ventti dealer. If the player drives too fast on the moped or on a vehicle that is missing a windshield, a bumblebee could blind the player. This is preventable if the player wears a racing helmet.

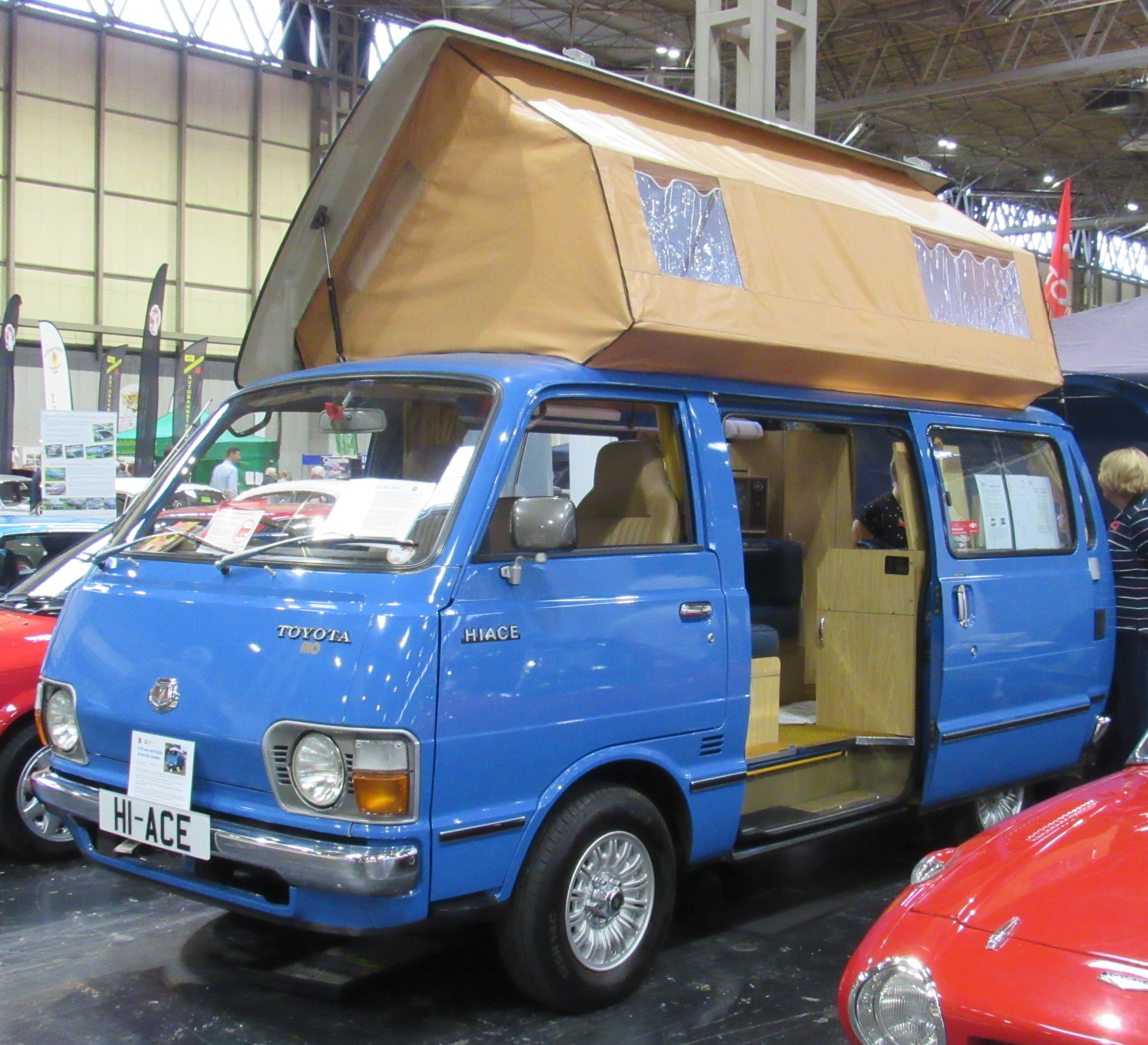
The second generation Toyota Hiace after which the van is modeled

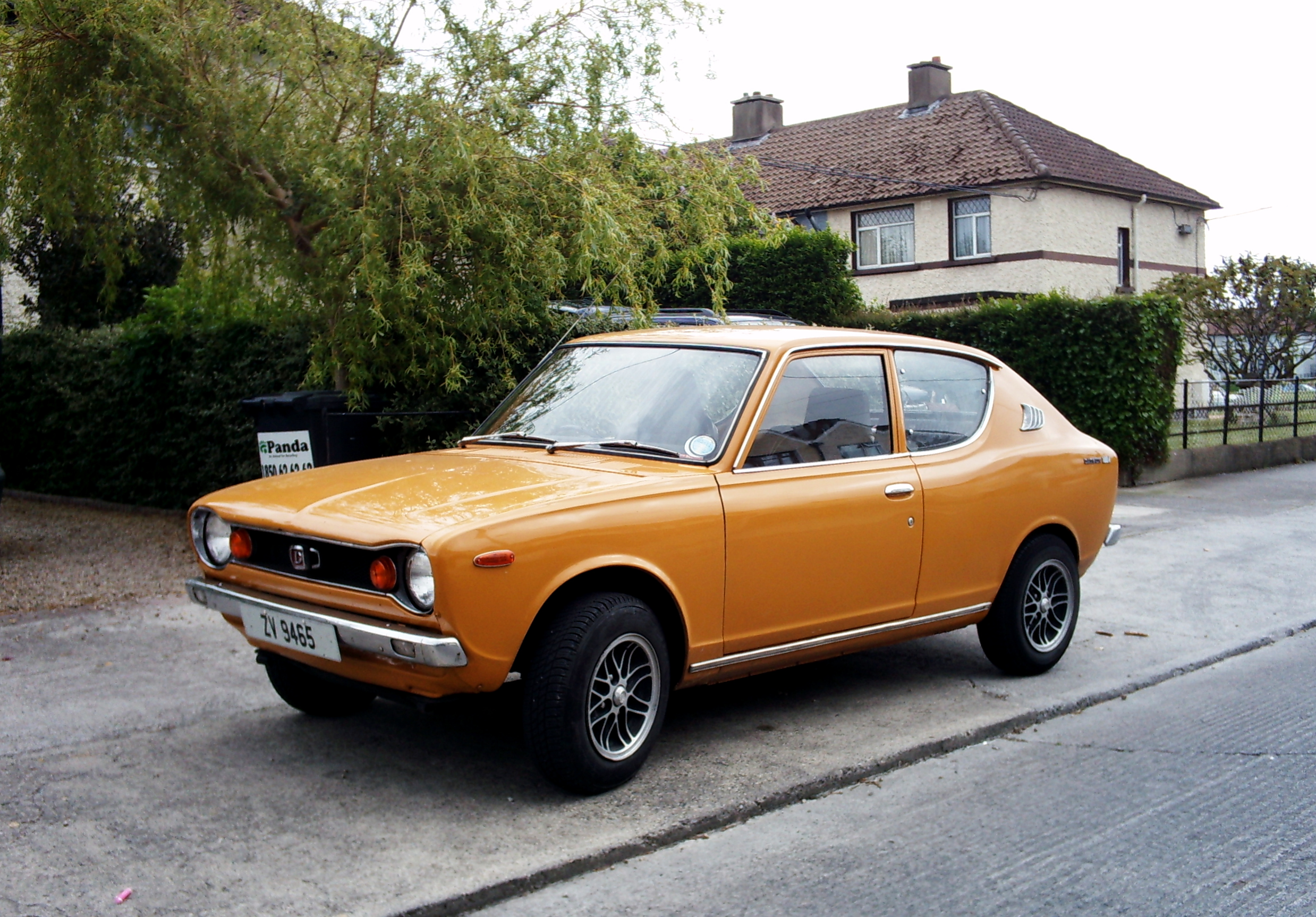
The Datsun 100A, after which the main car is modeled

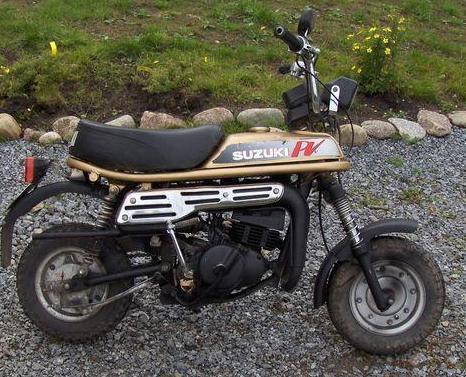
The Suzuki PV 50, after which the moped is modeled

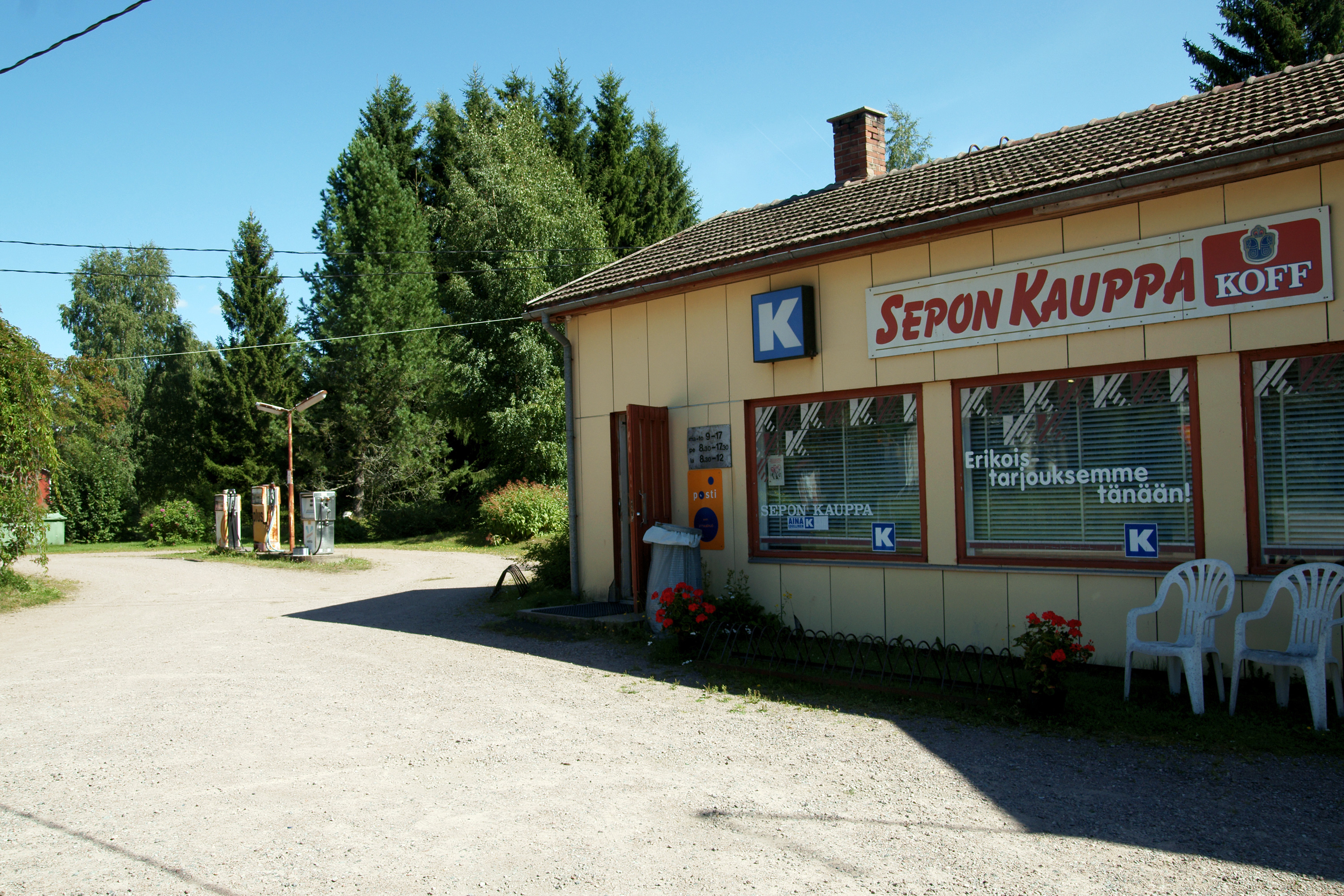
Sepon Kauppa in Yttilä, Säkylä served as the inspiration for Teimo's shop

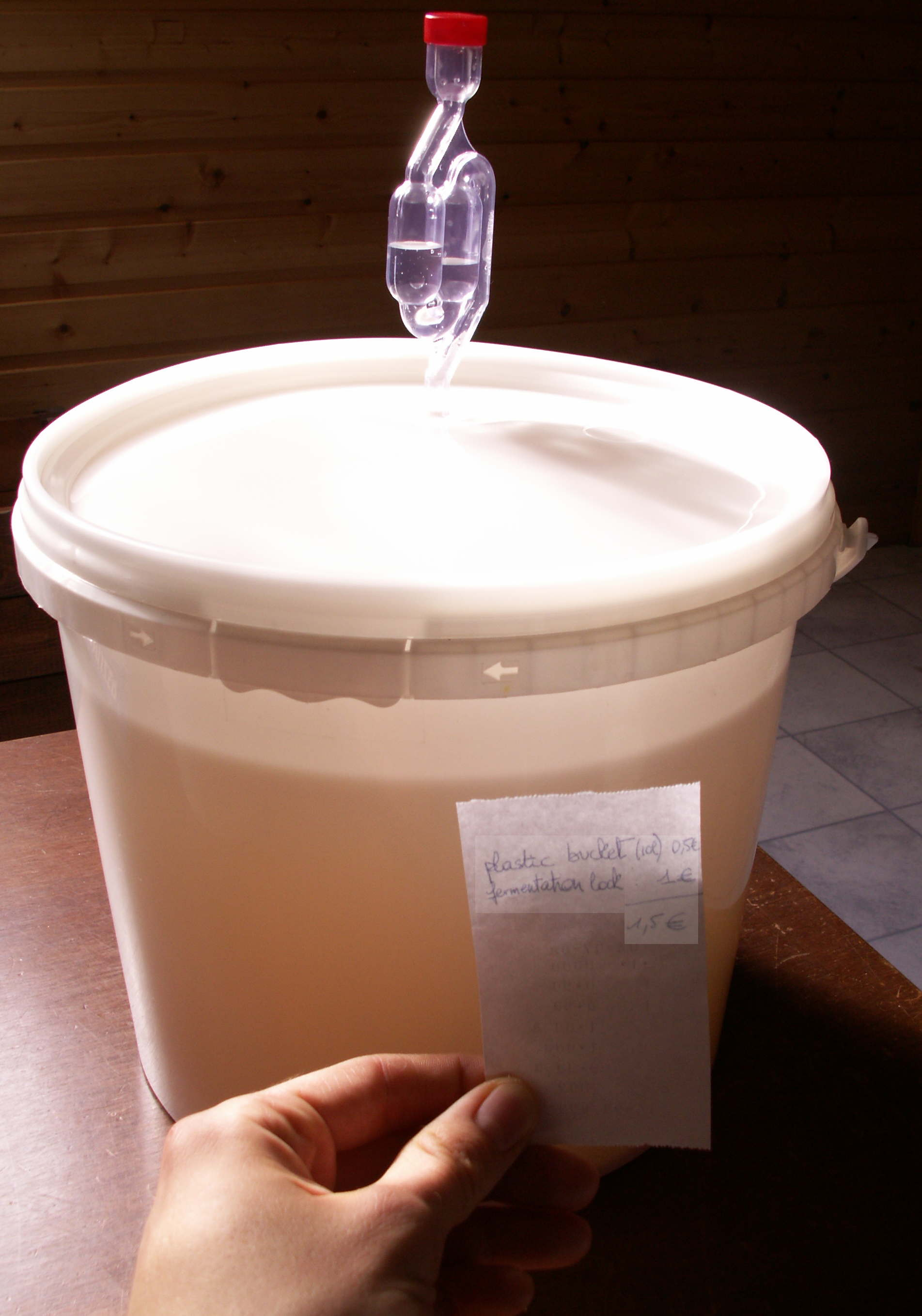
Kilju, a homemade alcoholic beverage

== Development ==
My Summer Car is primarily developed by an independent development team consisting of Johannes Rojola ("ToplessGun"/"RoyalJohnLove"/"jouhiraketi") and his wife Kaarina, with third parties assisting with music and voice overs. Closed development and beta testing of the game had been documented as early as December 2013, with snippets of the development's progress seen on Rojola's YouTube channel and Twitter account. The game was released as an early access game via Steam's Greenlight program on 24 October 2016. Since then, the game has been incrementally updated with new features and overhauls several times. On 30 December 2024, an update was released along with an announcement stating that "the game is transitioning away from Early Access", and that a sequel was under active development.

On 8 January 2025, My Summer Car was officially released from Early Access on Steam along with the release of a new game trailer.

== Reception ==
The game received generally positive reviews. Writing for Rock, Paper, Shotgun, Brendan Caldwell called the game "Funny, detailed and thoroughly confusing." Nathan Grayson, in an article for Kotaku, called the game "Janky and weird as fuck, but fun." Both the Rock, Paper, Shotgun article and Eurogamer's Martin Robinson compared the game's difficulty curve to Dark Souls.

My Summer Car has also received a number of awards and honors from the Finnish gaming community. At the 2017 Finnish Game Awards, the game won the People's Choice Game of the Year 2016 "Kyöpelit" award. In 2018, My Summer Car was inducted into the Finnish Museum of Games among the museum's 100 game entries of that year.

== Sequel ==
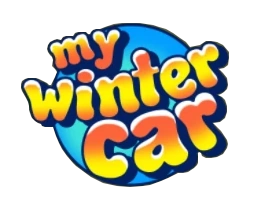
Logo of the sequel, My Winter Car

A sequel, My Winter Car (MWC), was originally announced on 29 May 2020, but the release of the game was delayed. In 2022, the game's developer published cryptically interpretable information about the game's possible release date on Steam. My Winter Car's Steam store page was launched on 28 November 2025, and game entered early access on Steam on 29 December 2025.

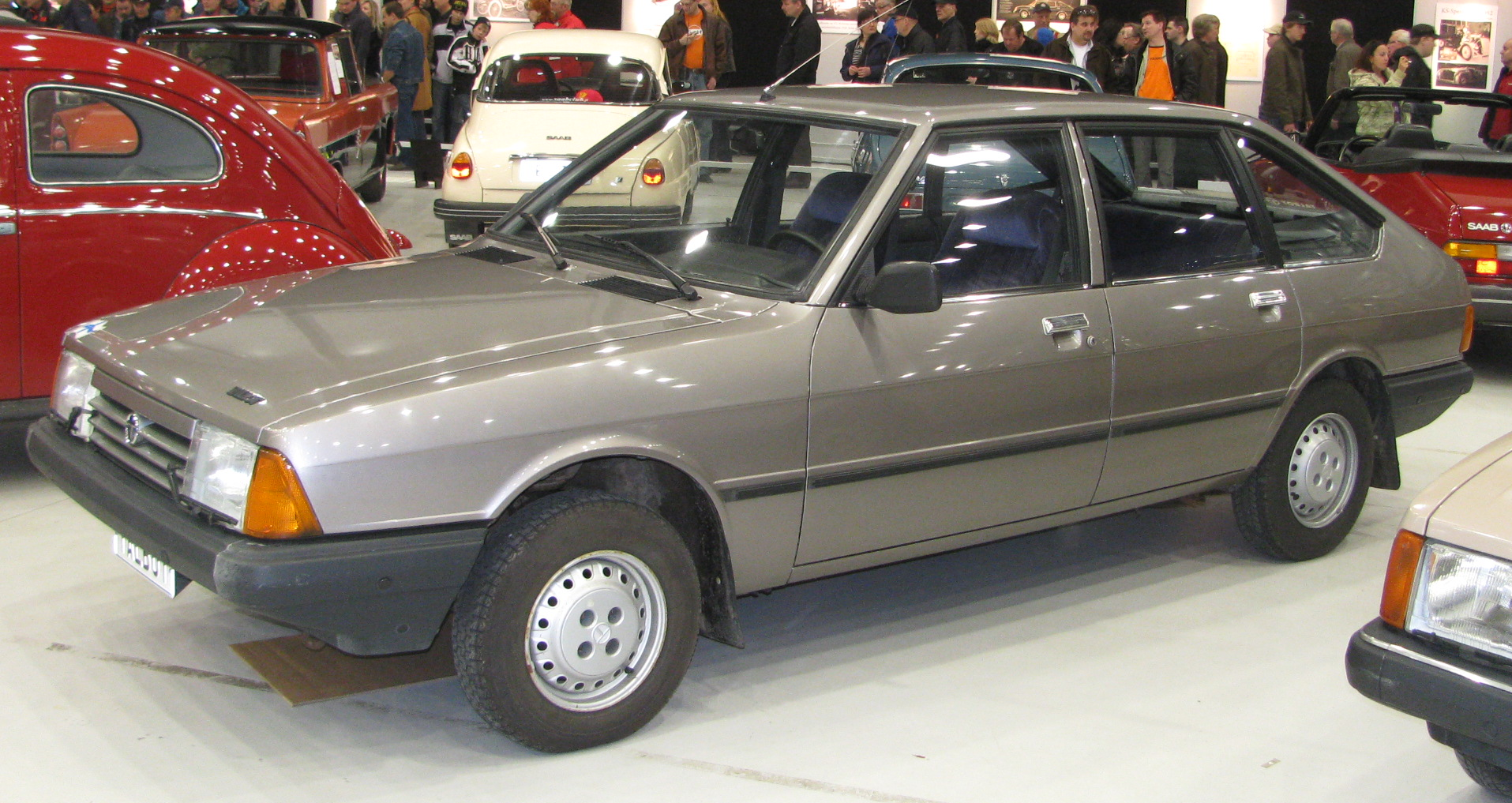
The Talbot 1510 the "Sorbet" is based on

My Winter Car is set in the same location as the previous game, but takes place during the middle of winter in early 1999. The project car is a "Corris Rivett", modeled after a Ford Taunus TC, and the player's starter vehicle is a Talbot 1510 (or "Sorbet"). In addition to winter rallies, the game also features folkrace-styled ice racing on the frozen Peräjärvi. The game's developer has said that the game is significantly more difficult than its predecessor.

== See also ==
- List of simulation video games
- Video games in Finland
- Last Drop (video game)
- Sauna2000
