= Promille (video game) =

- Developer(s): Alko
- Platform(s): MS-DOS
- Genre(s): Educational
- Mode(s): Single-player

Promille is a video game for MS-DOS, released by the Finnish national alcoholic beverage retailing monopoly Alko in 1980s. It was developed as an educational game to warn against the dangers of alcohol consumption, and was marketed mainly to schools. The game centers around a player created character that visits a bar for food and beverages, while the resulting effects depend on the heights, weight and gender of the created characters, as well as the chosen beverages.

The game was unknown to most game collectors and thought to have disappeared from circulation until its rediscovery in 2017, when the only known copy was handed to the Finnish Museum of Games. The museum is in talks with Alko about re-publishing the game online.
