= Vapriikki Museum Centre =

Museum in Tampere, Finland

- Museokeskus Vapriikki
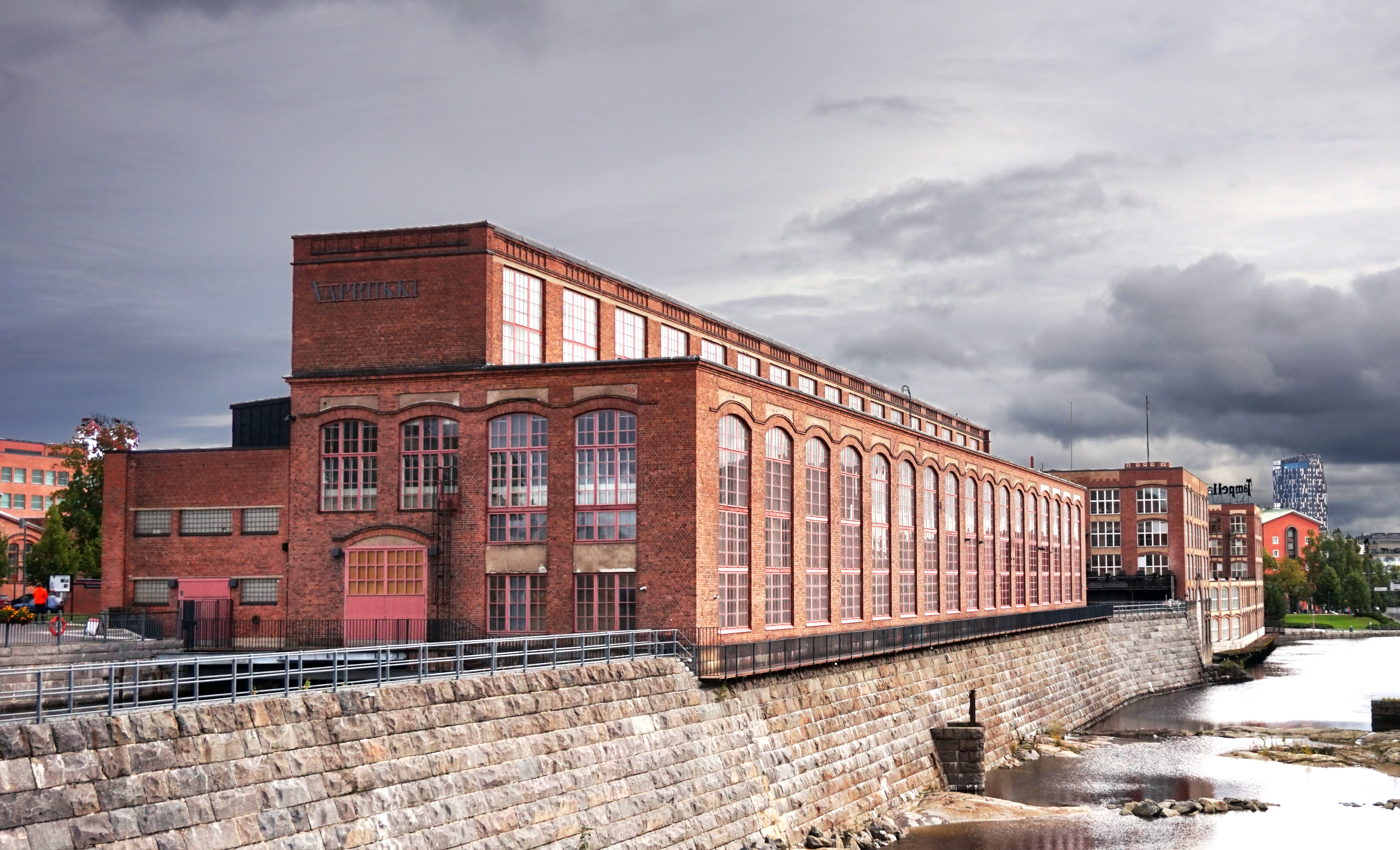
- Established: 1996
- Location: Tampella, Tampere, Finland
- Coordinates: 61.5030°N 23.7605°E
- Visitors: c. 170,000 (2019)
- Owner: City of Tampere
- Website: vapriikki.fi/en/

The Vapriikki Museum Centre (Finnish: Museokeskus Vapriikki) is a cluster of museums operating in the old factory premises of Tampella, in Tampere, Finland. The name Vapriikki derives from the Swedish word fabrik, meaning factory.

== Overview ==
The facility was first opened to the public in 1996, and the centre was completed in 2000.

In 2019, the centre was visited by over 170,000 visitors.

Of the total floor area of 14,000 square metres (150,000 sq ft), approximately half is available for exhibitions and other public use.

In 2017, Vapriikki Museum Centre was chosen as the "Museum of the Century" in a public vote to mark the 100th anniversary of Finnish independence.

== Museums ==
Museums based in the centre include:

- Natural History Museum of Tampere
- Rupriikki Media Museum
- Finnish Museum of Games
- Finnish Ice Hockey Museum and the Finnish Hockey Hall of Fame
- Postal Museum (Postimuseo)
- Doll and Dress Museum (Nukke- ja pukumuseo)
- Pirkanmaa Regional Museum (Pirkanmaan maakuntamuseo)
