= Nissan Cherry =

Subcompact car series produced by Datsun and Nissan (1970–1986)

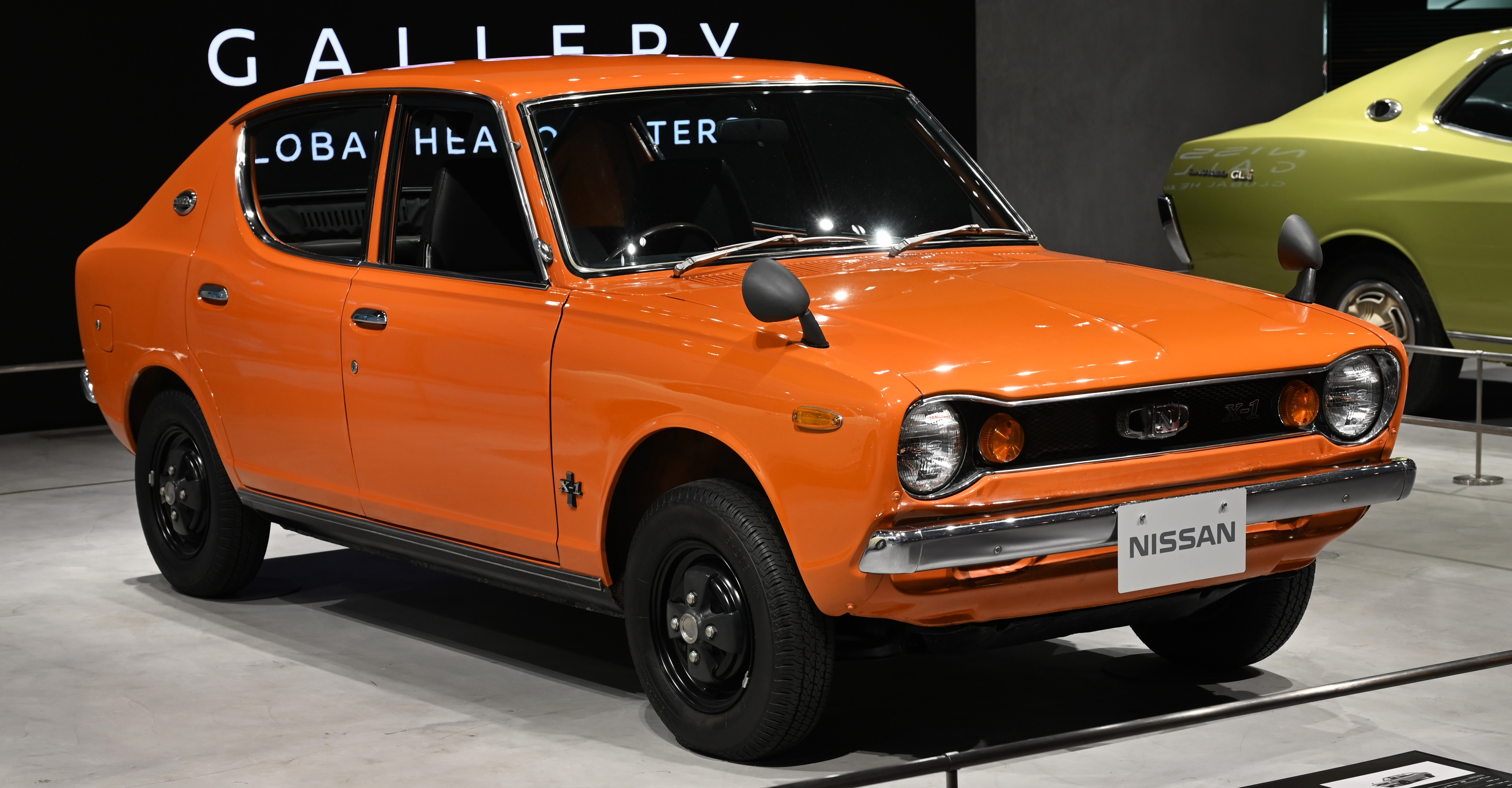
- 1970 Nissan Cherry Sedan X-1

Overview
- Manufacturer: Nissan
- Also called: Datsun Cherry
- Production: 1970–1986
- Assembly: Japan: Oppama Plant, Yokosuka, Kanagawa; Greece: Volos (TEOKAR); Ireland: Dublin

Body and chassis
- Class: Supermini/Subcompact car
- Layout: Front-engine, front-wheel-drive

Chronology
- Successor: Nissan AD/Wingroad (station wagon); Nissan Pulsar (Europe); Nissan March/Micra (Japan)

The Datsun Cherry (チェリー), known later as the Nissan Cherry, is a series of subcompact cars which formed Nissan's first front-wheel drive supermini model line.

The Nissan Cherry featured the front-engine, front-wheel-drive layout. The Cherry line includes the E10 and F10. Nissan's direct successor was the Nissan Pulsar worldwide, which continued to use the Cherry name in certain markets.

In Japan, the Cherry was exclusive to Nissan Cherry Store locations.

On the UK market, it debuted just before the company's surge in sales, which saw it sell just over 6,000 cars in 1971 and more than 30,000 the following year. Although its successor was launched in 1974, such was the original model's popularity on the UK market that it was not replaced there until 1976.

== Background ==
Originally, before combining with Nissan Motors, the Prince Motor Company plan of development was to mass-produce a front-engine, front-wheel drive car. Subsequent to the Prince and Nissan merger of 1966, the Cherry was released in 1970 as Nissan's first front-wheel drive car instead. In Asian markets there was also a "Cherry Cab" cabover truck model (C20), which was closely related to the Nissan Sunny — it was also marketed as the "Sunny Cab".

== First generation (E10; 1970) ==
First generation
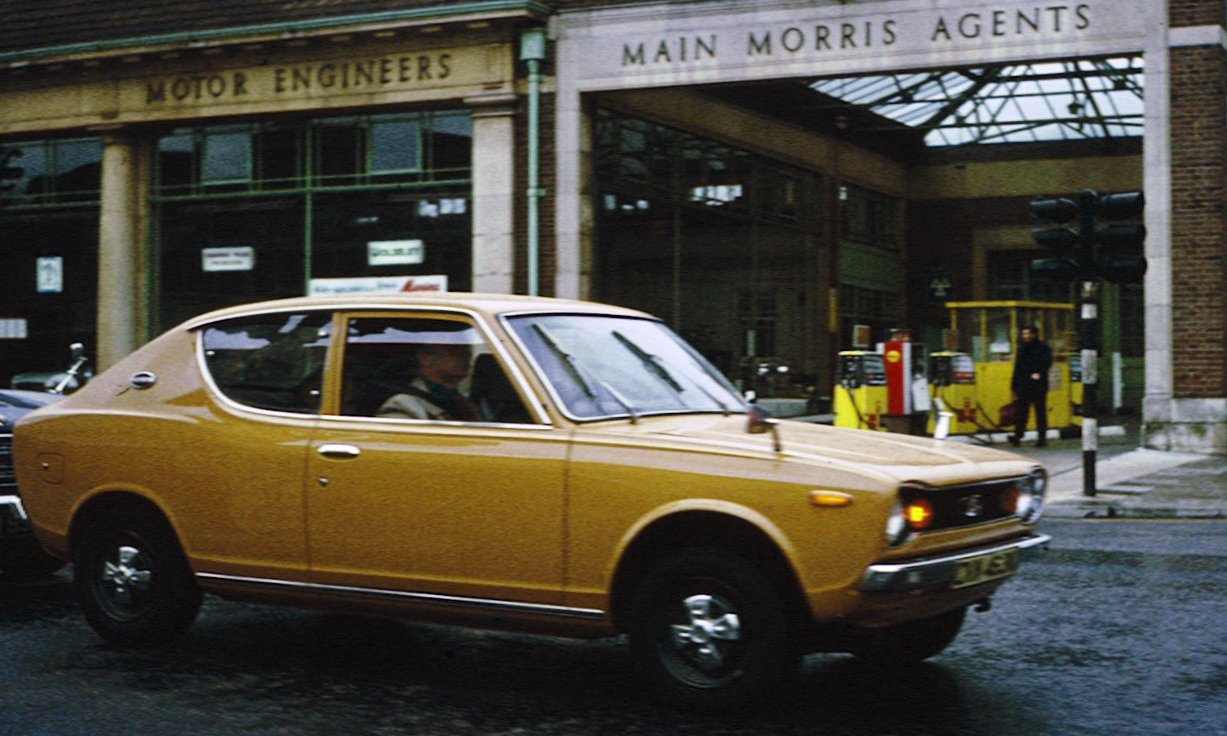
- Datsun 100A Cherry 2-door 1972 (European contemporary nomenclature)

Overview
- Model code: E10
- Also called: Datsun Cherry; Datsun 1000; Datsun 100A
- Production: October 1970–1977

Body and chassis
- Body style: 2-/4-door sedan; 3-door wagon/light van; 2-door coupé

Powertrain
- Engine: 988 cc A10 I4; 1171 cc A12 I4
- Transmission: 4-speed manual all-synchromesh

Dimensions
- Wheelbase: 2,335 mm (91.9 in)
- Length: 3,660 mm (144.1 in)
- Width: 1,490 mm (58.7 in)
- Height: 1,380 mm (54.3 in)
- Curb weight: 670 kg (1,477 lb)

The E10 generation featured four-wheel independent suspension.

The E10 was fitted with two varieties of inline four-cylinder Nissan A-series OHV engines:

- 1.0 L (988 cc) A10
- 1.2 L (1,171 cc) A12

Although the car used a Nissan engine, the powertrain dated back to Prince's original concept – which was in essence inspired by the "transmission-in-sump" layout pioneered by the British Motor Corporation in the Mini, but with the key difference that the transmission was housed separately and therefore did not share lubricating oil with the engine. However, the similar use of transfer gears gave the E10 a very distinctive transmission whine which was characteristic of this mechanical configuration.

The sporting Japanese domestic market Cherry X-1 model featured twin-carburetted A12T engine with dual-sidedraft Hitachi carburettors.

In Europe, the A10-engined E10 Cherry was called Datsun 100A (the Datsun brand being used in place of Nissan in the European market at that time) or Datsun 120A (A12, but this engine was only available with the coupé body style or as a semi-automatic version of the ordinary car available in 1978). The names "Cherry" and "Datsun 1000" were also used in advertising, however the Datsun 1000 name was associated with the early Nissan Sunny and Nissan Bluebird. The Cherry was introduced in Japan at a specially established dealership sales channel called Nissan Cherry Shop, whereas the Sunny was sold at Nissan Satio Shop, and the Bluebird was sold at the Nissan Bluebird Shop. As the Cherry F-II successor flagged in the market, the somewhat smaller E10 Cherry continued to be sold up until 1977 in many places.

With the launch of the Cherry in 1971, Datsun's prominence in the UK market grew. In the early 1970s, as the British auto-industry faltered, Datsun led the charge of Japanese auto-manufacturers rapidly gaining market share in the UK. Britain's Motor magazine polled readers about their cars, including, in February 1973, those who owned E10 Cherrys. The question given greatest prominence was the final one which asked whether or not respondents would buy another car of the same model: 76 percent of Cherry owning respondents answered "yes", which was the top score for this question achieved by any model to date, and beat even the 66 percent "yes" score given by owners of the previous leader, the Volkswagen Beetle, at the time well known in the UK for its owners' brand loyalty.

=== Gallery ===
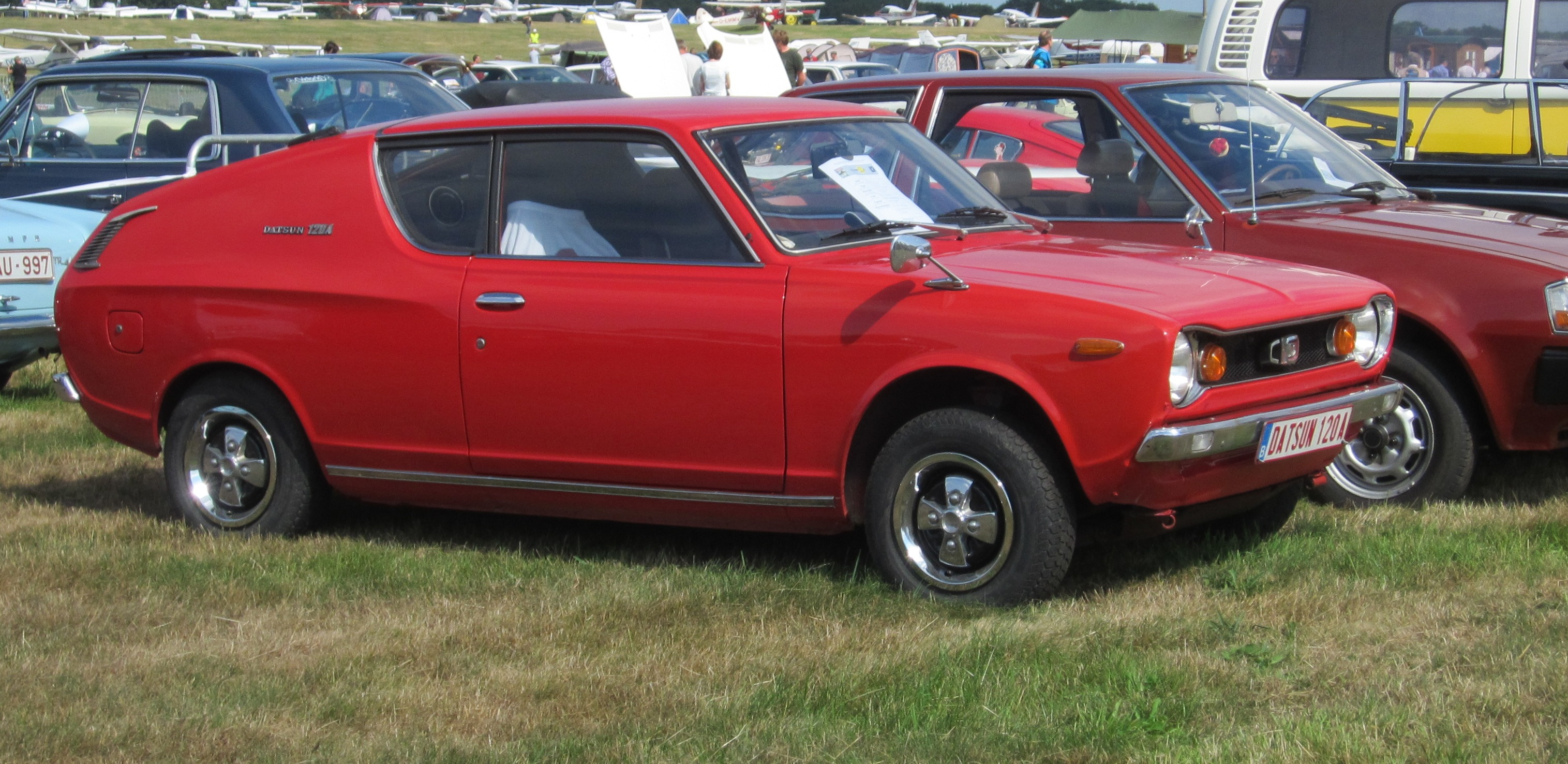
Datsun 120A Cherry coupé 1973 (European contemporary nomenclature)

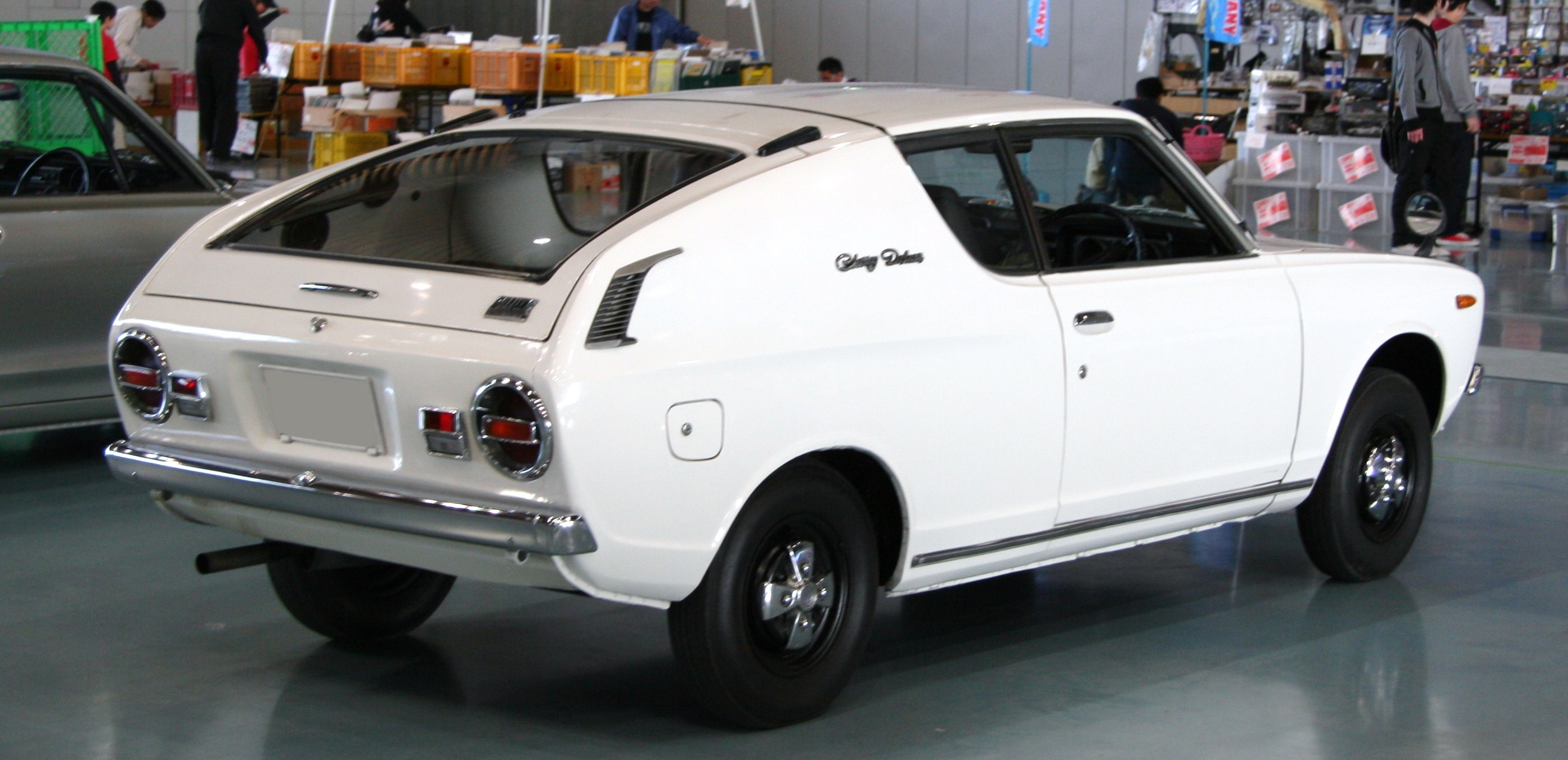
Rear view (Coupe)

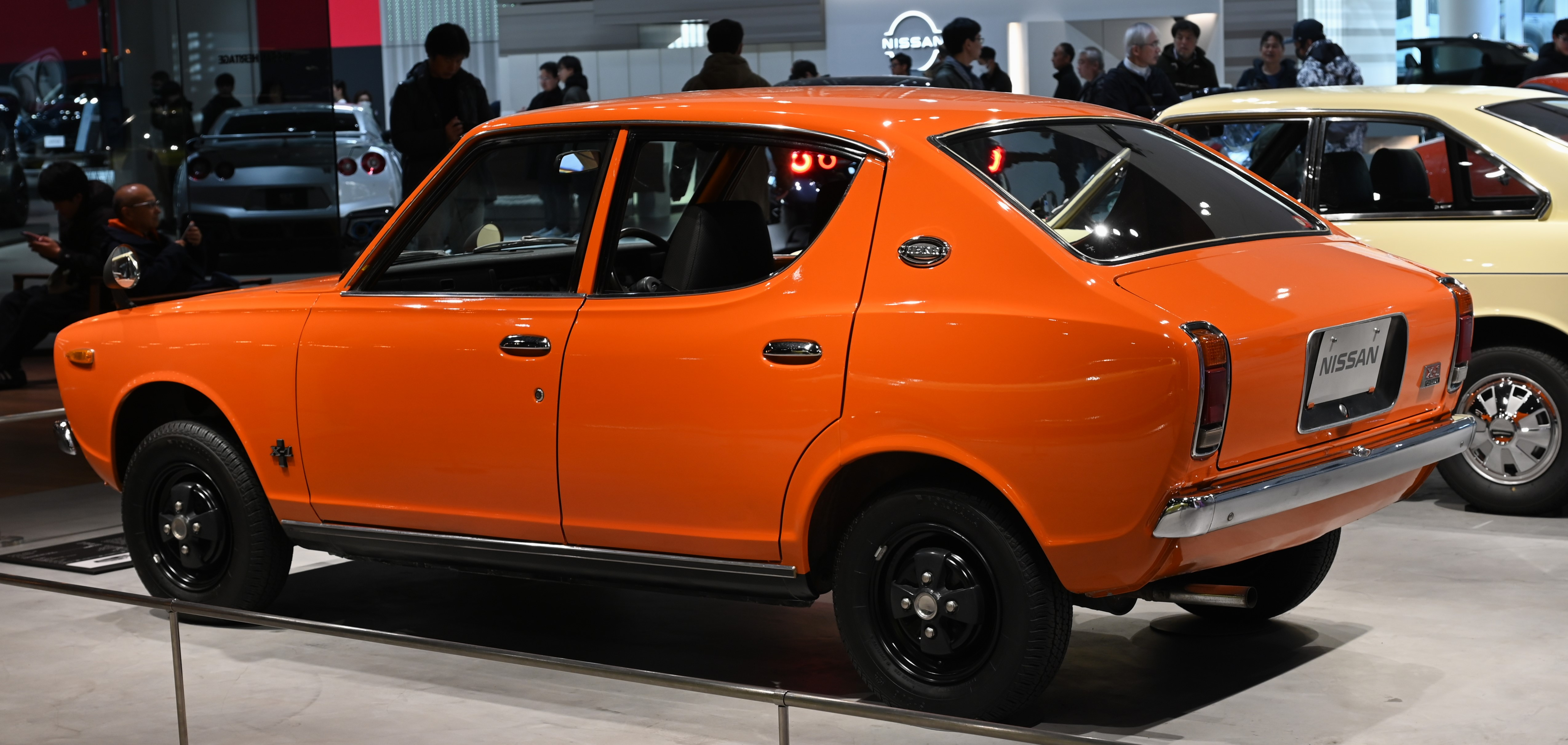
Rear view (Cherry Sedan X-1)

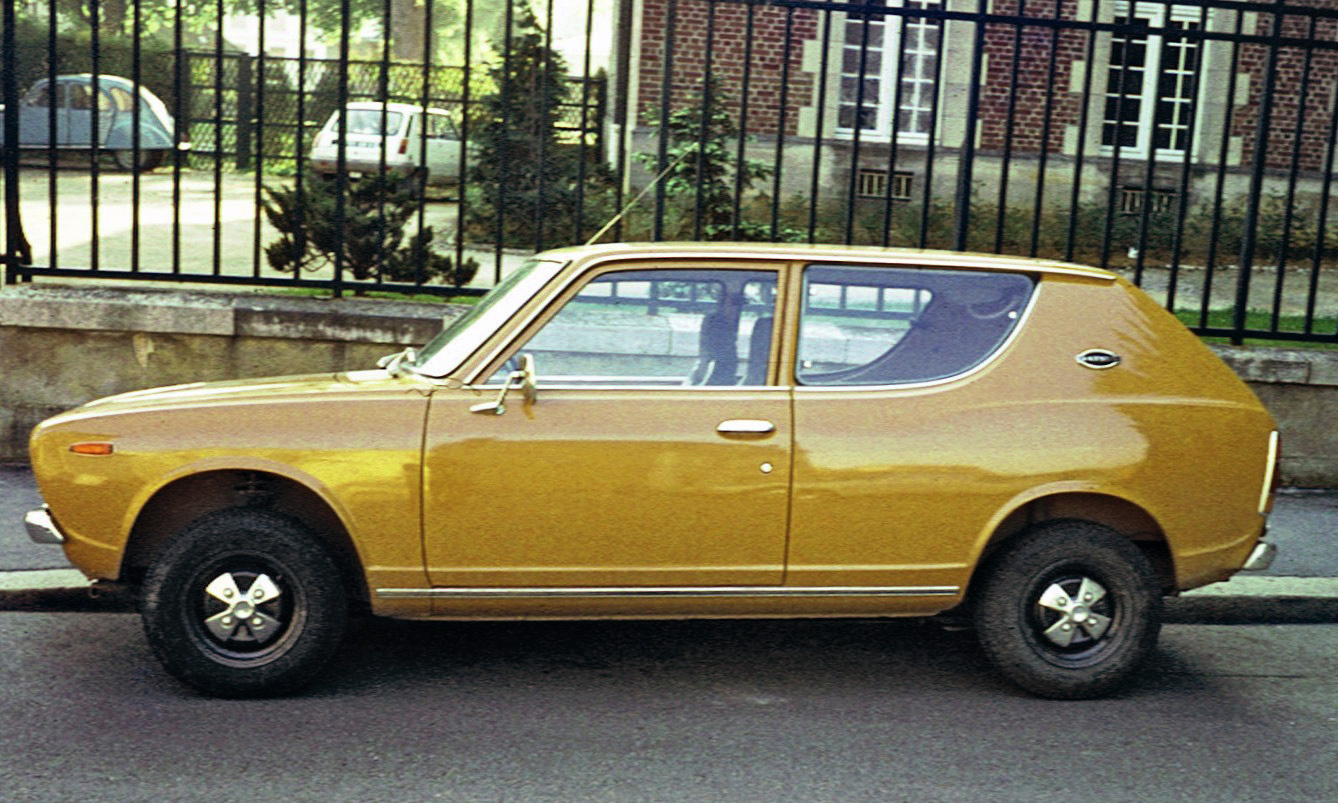
Datsun Cherry estate 1975

=== Timeline ===
- 1970 October: E10 goes on sale in Japan. Only four-door and two-door sedans were available initially.
- 1970: 17th Tokyo motor show, exhibiting the concept car "270X" which designates the Cherry as the base.
- 1971 end of September: coupé version added
- 1972 March: three-door van version added
- Cherry coupé debuts in 1972 April race Japan. As a Nissan works entry, it participated also in other domestic Japan races.
- 1972 June: Revised model with updated grille, rear lights and hubcaps released. This was called the 1973 model year version in most markets.
- 1973 March: debut of Cherry coupé 1200X-1 R with "fender flares"
- 1976: Acropolis Rally privateer entry
- 1977: E10 production ceases

=== In popular culture ===
A fictionalised Datsun 100A (known in-universe as the Satsuma AMP) is featured in the Finnish video game My Summer Car set in the fictional municipality of Alivieska. It serves as the protagonist's main car, that they must assemble, tune and maintain.

== Second generation (F10; 1974) ==
Second generation
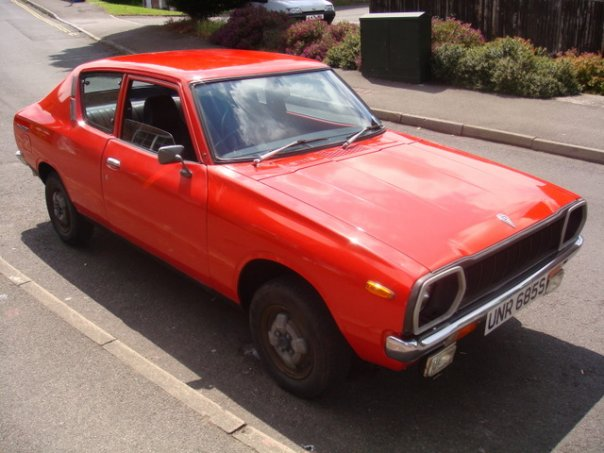

Overview
- Model code: F10
- Also called: Datsun Cherry; Datsun F-II; Datsun F10; Datsun 100A F-II; Datsun 120A F-II
- Production: 1974–1978

Body and chassis
- Body style: 2/4-door sedan 3-door station wagon 3-door Panel Van; 3-door liftback coupé

Powertrain
- Engine: 988 cc A10 I4; 1171 cc A12 I4 (F10); 1397 cc A14 I4 (PF10)

Dimensions
- Wheelbase: 2,395 mm (94.3 in)
- Length: 3,825 mm (150.6 in)
- Width: 1,500 mm (59.1 in)
- Height: 1,375 mm (54.1 in)
- Curb weight: 755 kg (1,664 lb)

The second-generation Cherry was known as F-II in Japan and "Datsun F10" in North America. It was Nissan's first front-wheel-drive model to be sold in North America. Four-wheel independent suspension continued to be used. Sales of the F-II were generally disappointing, and the "Cherry" nameplate was retired in Japan after this generation.

The F10 Cherry was fitted with three types of inline four-cylinder Nissan A-series OHV engines, the A10, A12, and A14, displacing 1.0, 1.2, and 1.4 litres respectively:

Engine	Layout, valvetrain	Displacement	Fuel system	Power	Torque	Notes
A10	OHV inline-four, two valves per cylinder	1.0 L (988 cc)	twin-barrel, downdraught carburetor	45 PS DIN (33 kW; 44 bhp) at 5,600 rpm	7.7 kg⋅m DIN (76 N⋅m; 56 lb⋅ft) at 4,000 rpm	Europe
A12	OHV inline-four, two valves per cylinder	1.2 L (1,171 cc)	single-choke carburetor	68 PS JIS gross (50 kW; 67 bhp) at 6,000 rpm	9.7 kg⋅m JIS gross (95 N⋅m; 70 lb⋅ft) at 3,600 rpm	JDM
A12	OHV inline-four, two valves per cylinder	1.2 L (1,171 cc)	single-choke carburetor	52 PS DIN (38 kW; 51 bhp) at 5,600 rpm	9.4 kg⋅m DIN (92 N⋅m; 68 lb⋅ft) at 3,600 rpm	Europe (Note: Incl. Sweden, Switzerland)
A14	OHV inline-four, two valves per cylinder	1.4 L (1,397 cc)	single-choke carburetor	80 PS JIS gross (59 kW; 79 bhp) at 6,000 rpm	11.5 kg⋅m JIS gross (113 N⋅m; 83 lb⋅ft) at 3,600 rpm	JDM
A14	OHV inline-four, two valves per cylinder	1.4 L (1,397 cc)	single-choke carburetor	70 hp SAE net (52 kW; 71 PS) at 6,000 rpm 80 hp SAE gross (60 kW; 81 PS) at 6,000 rpm	75 lb⋅ft SAE net (102 N⋅m; 10 kg⋅m) at 3,600 rpm 83 lb⋅ft SAE gross (113 N⋅m; 11 kg⋅m) at 3,600 rpm	USA (Datsun F10)
A14S	OHV inline-four, two valves per cylinder	1.4 L (1,397 cc)	Twin-choke carburetor	92 PS JIS gross (68 kW; 91 bhp) at 6,400 rpm	11.7 kg⋅m JIS gross (115 N⋅m; 85 lb⋅ft) at 4,400 rpm	JDM

A two-pedal type semi-automatic transmission was offered called the "Sportmatic", which used a torque converter obviating the need for a clutch.

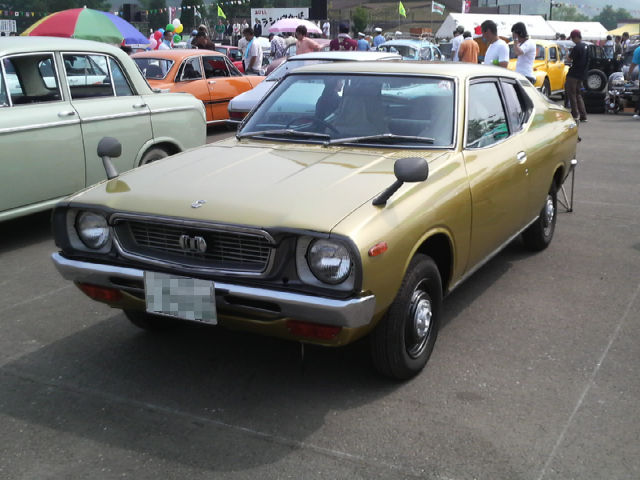
A Japanese-market Cherry F-II Coupé 1200

In Europe, the Cherry F10 was officially known as the Datsun 100A F-II (with A10 engine) or 120A F-II (with A12 engine), but period marketing material also included the "Cherry" nameplate. The A12 powered 120A F-II was the most common model, with the coupé only being available with the larger engine in the UK. National importers had significant leeway in this period and names often varied between markets; in Switzerland, for example, the FII station wagon was marketed as the "Hobby".

In New Zealand the 100A four-door sedan (1.0-litre A10 motor) was assembled from CKD kits as a price leader for the Datsun range – due to the choice of engine, it was the smallest engined car assembled in New Zealand at the time, the engine (988 cc) being smaller than the Mini's 998 cc unit. Production continued well after the N10 model replaced it overseas, eventually being discontinued in late 1980, with the N10 5-door hatchback replacing it in 1981.

In the US, only the coupé and wagon were offered, and only with the 1.4-litre engine. In Canada, the two-door sedan was also available.

It was not launched in the UK market until 1976, due to the popularity of the original Cherry model there. Once it went on sale, it was a good seller and helped the Datsun brand maintain strong sales figures.

=== Timeline ===
- 1974 September: Sale started in Japan. Body styles included 2- and 4-door sedans, and a 3-door van (wagons were typically sold as commercial vehicles in Japan).
- 1976: Coupé introduced in Japan.
- 1976: Full lineup launched in Europe.
- 1977: Coupé launched in the UK.
- 1978: Four FIIs were entered in the Swedish Rally; the local dealer entry finished 19th overall, second in class.
- In May 1978, the Nissan Pulsar (N10 type) appeared as a successor model to the Cherry, originally only as a four-door. The four-door Cherry F-II was discontinued, with the two-door and coupé ending production subsequent to the corresponding additions to the Pulsar range in September 1978. At this time the Cherry name was discontinued on the Japan home market. The F10 was finally replaced in Europe in March 1979.

== Third generation (N10; 1978) ==
Third generation
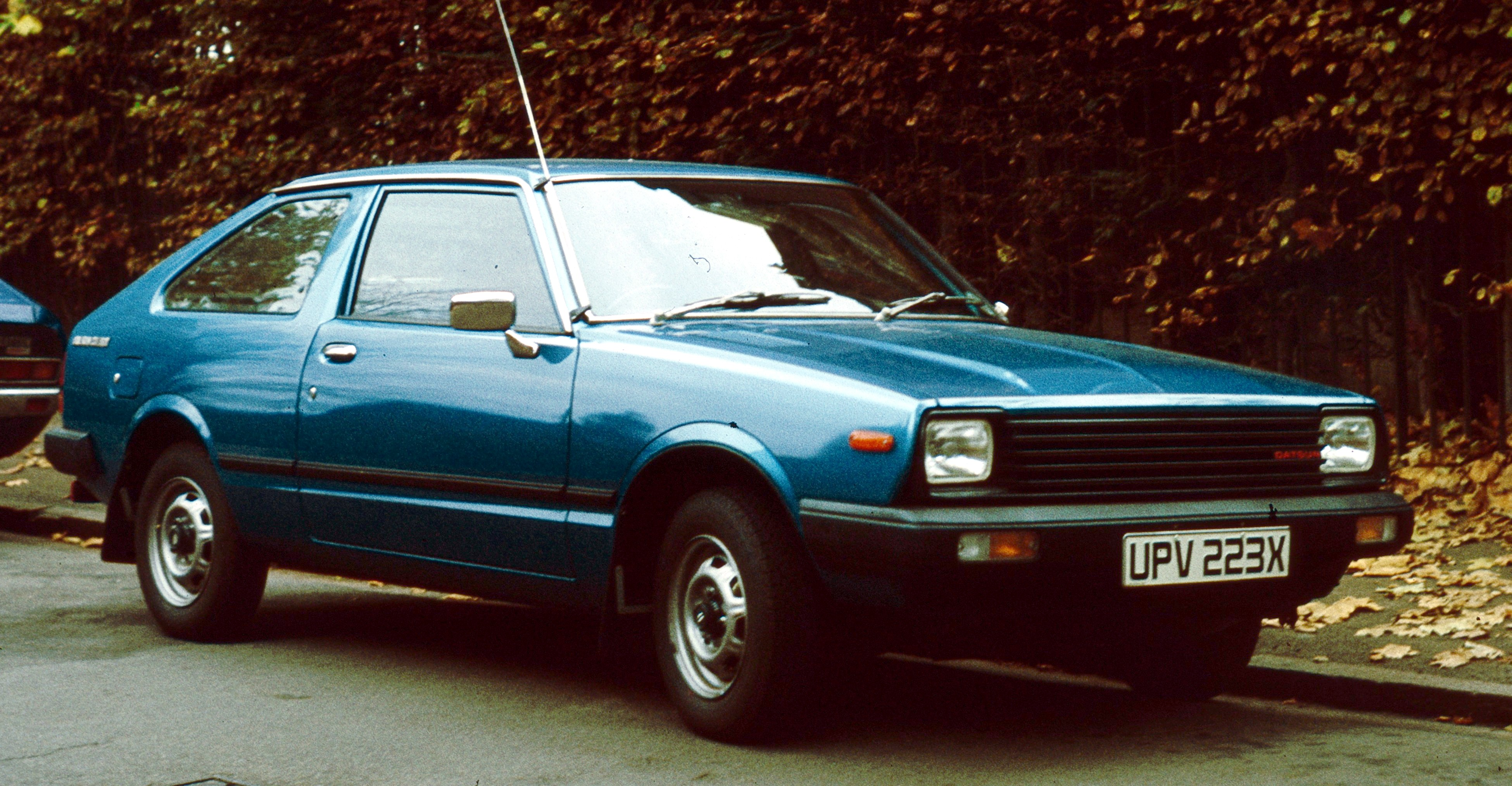

Overview
- Model code: N10
- Also called: Datsun Cherry
- Production: 1978–1982

Body and chassis
- Related: Nissan Sunny; Nissan Vanette

The N10 model Pulsar was introduced to Japan in May 1978, with European sales beginning in March 1979. While known as the Nissan Pulsar in Japan, it was called Cherry in Europe and many other export markets. The body styling was more boxy, and influenced by designs coming out of Europe at that time. It came at a time when small hatchbacks were enjoying rising sales across Europe, with the Ford Fiesta, Volkswagen Polo, Renault 5 and Fiat 127 being particularly popular, along with the General Motors product which was known in Britain as the Vauxhall Chevette and on the continent as the Opel Kadett City. It continued to sell well in Britain, and the most popular foreign car there in 1981. In the American market it was sold as the Datsun 310, slightly upscale from the old-fashioned rear wheel drive Datsun 210.

Engine choices were carried over from the previous model, consisting of Nissan's A-Series motor in 1.0 L, 1.2 L and 1.4 L forms. At some point, the A12 was replaced by the marginally larger A12A in export markets as well. Production of the N10 series ceased in mid-1982, to be replaced by larger N12 Cherry/Pulsar, which was sold in Europe from September 1982.

== Fourth generation (N12; 1982) ==
Fourth generation
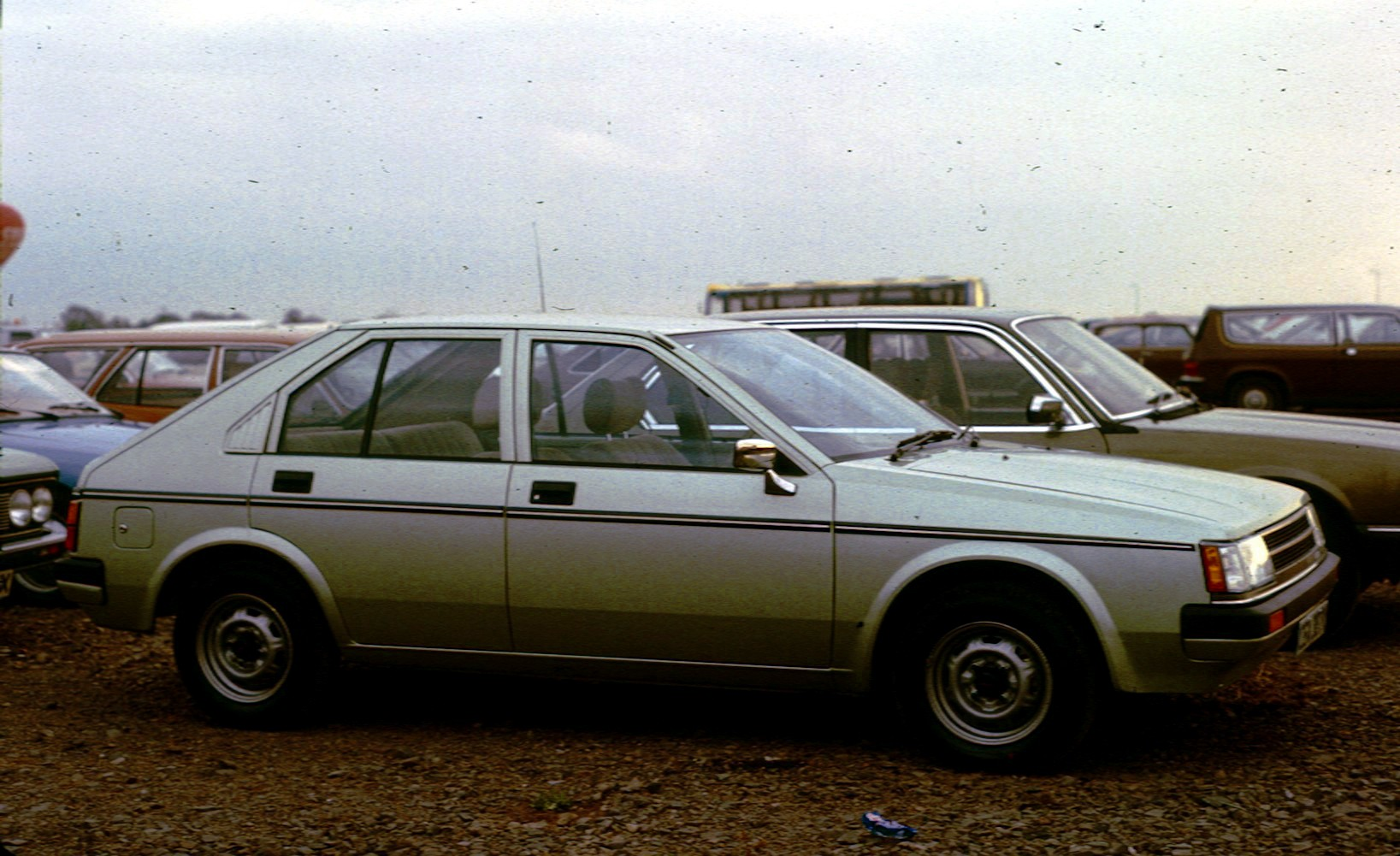

Overview
- Model code: N12
- Also called: Nissan Cherry Europe; Nissan Pulsar Milano; Nissan Langley; Nissan Liberta Villa; Alfa Romeo Arna; Holden Astra (LB/LC)
- Production: 1982–1986
- Assembly: Japan: Oppama Plant, Yokosuka, Kanagawa; Greece: Volos (TEOKAR); Italy: Pratola Serra

Body and chassis
- Body style: 3-door hatchback 4-door sedan 5-door hatchback

Powertrain
- Engine: Petrol: 988 cc E10 I4; 1186 cc AS 305 H4; 1270 cc E13 I4; 1488 cc E15 I4; 1488 cc E15ET turbo I4; 1490 cc AS 31016 H4; Diesel: 1681 cc CD17 I4

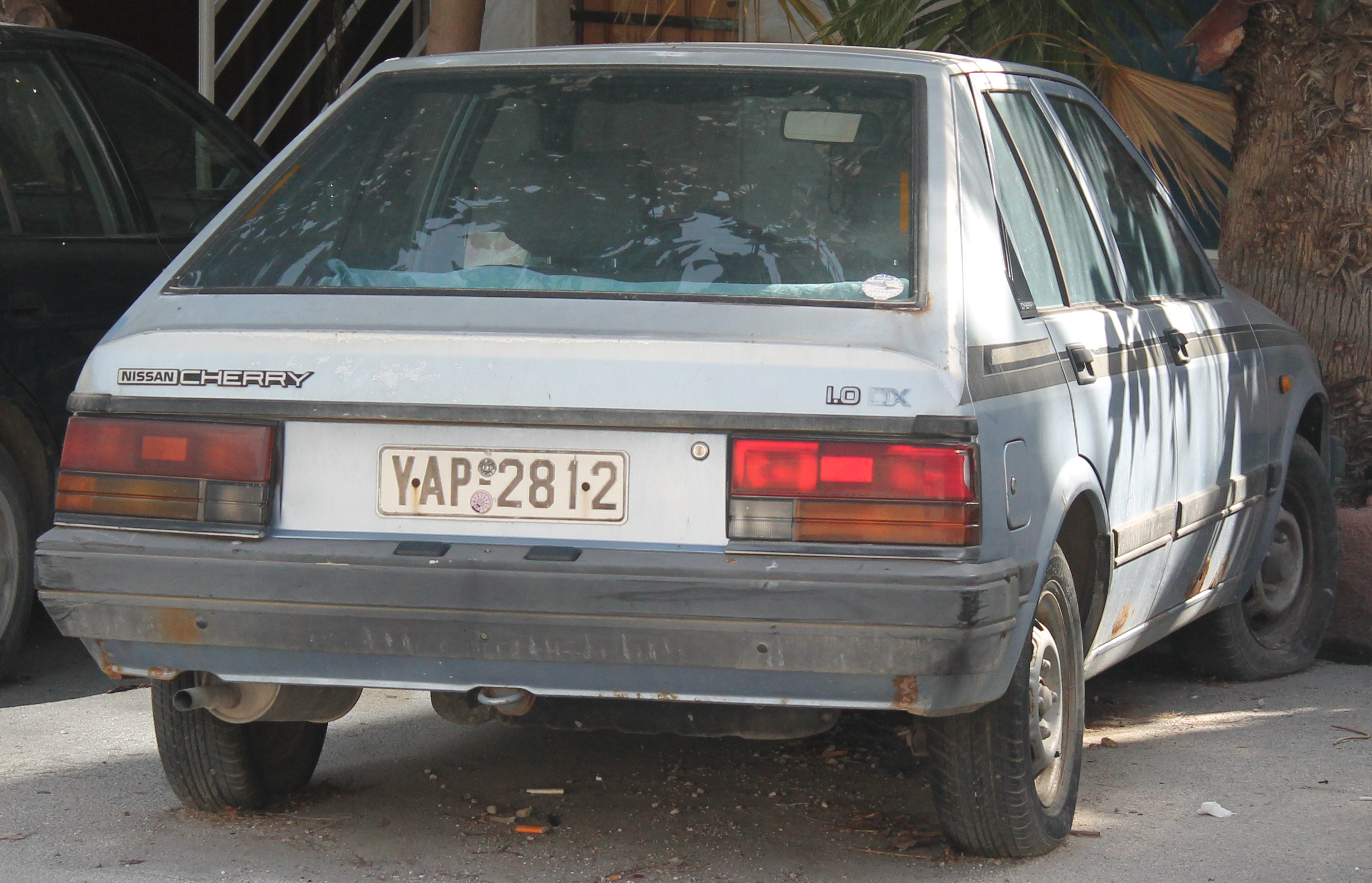
Greek-assembled Nissan Cherry (N12), showing Japanese model light clusters

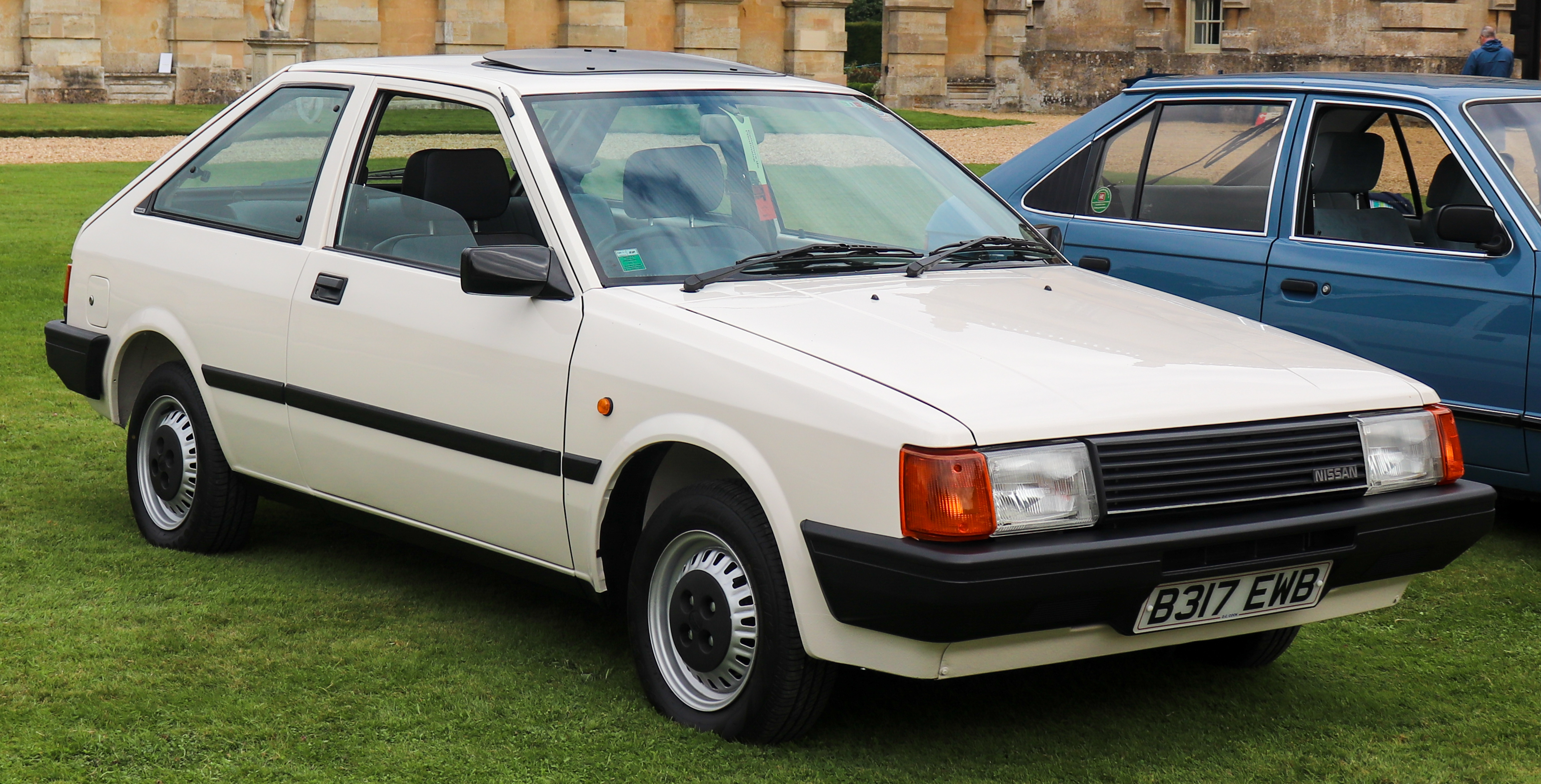

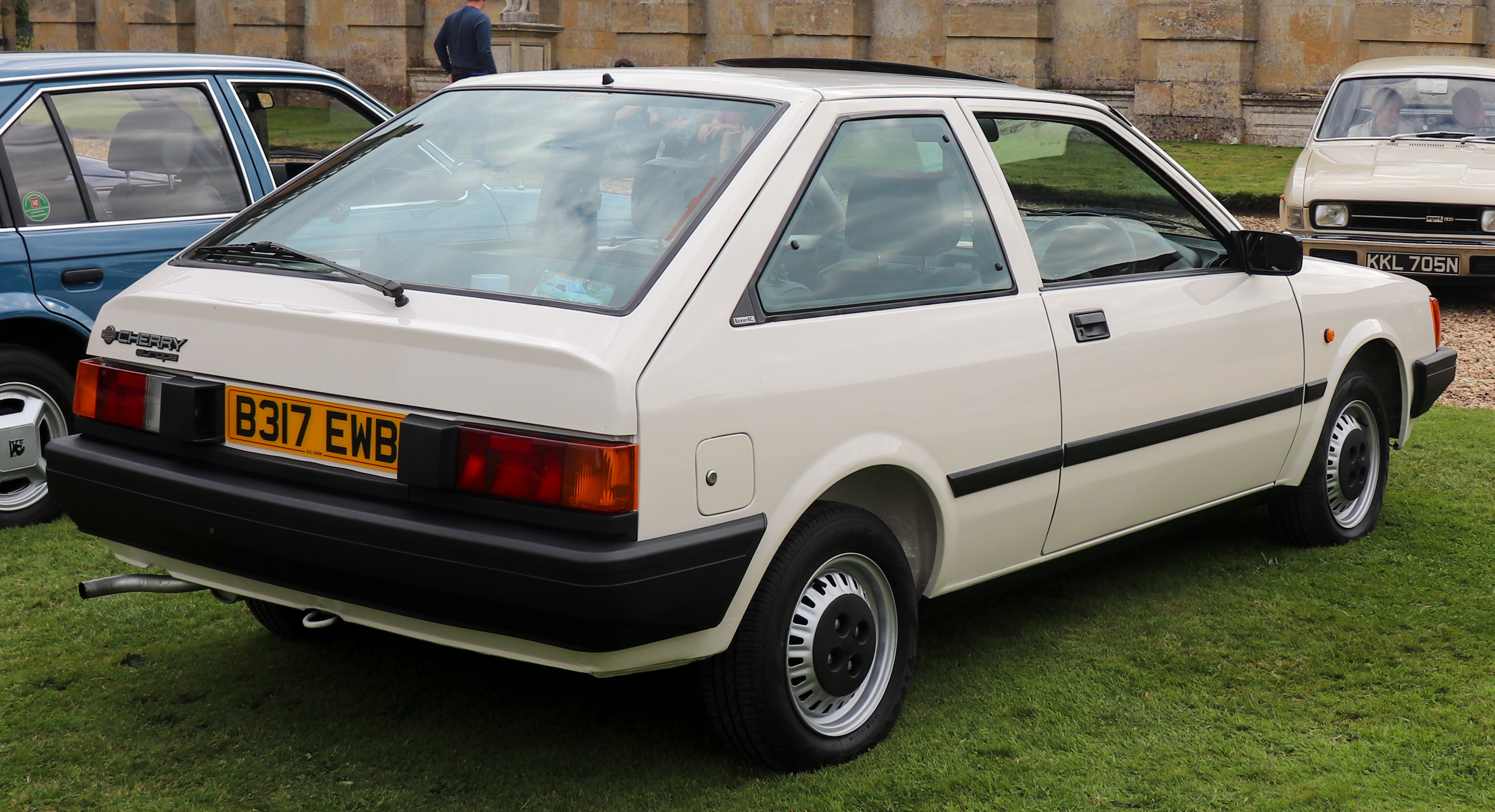
Nissan Cherry Europe, showing Italian model light clusters as also seen on the Alfa Romeo Arna

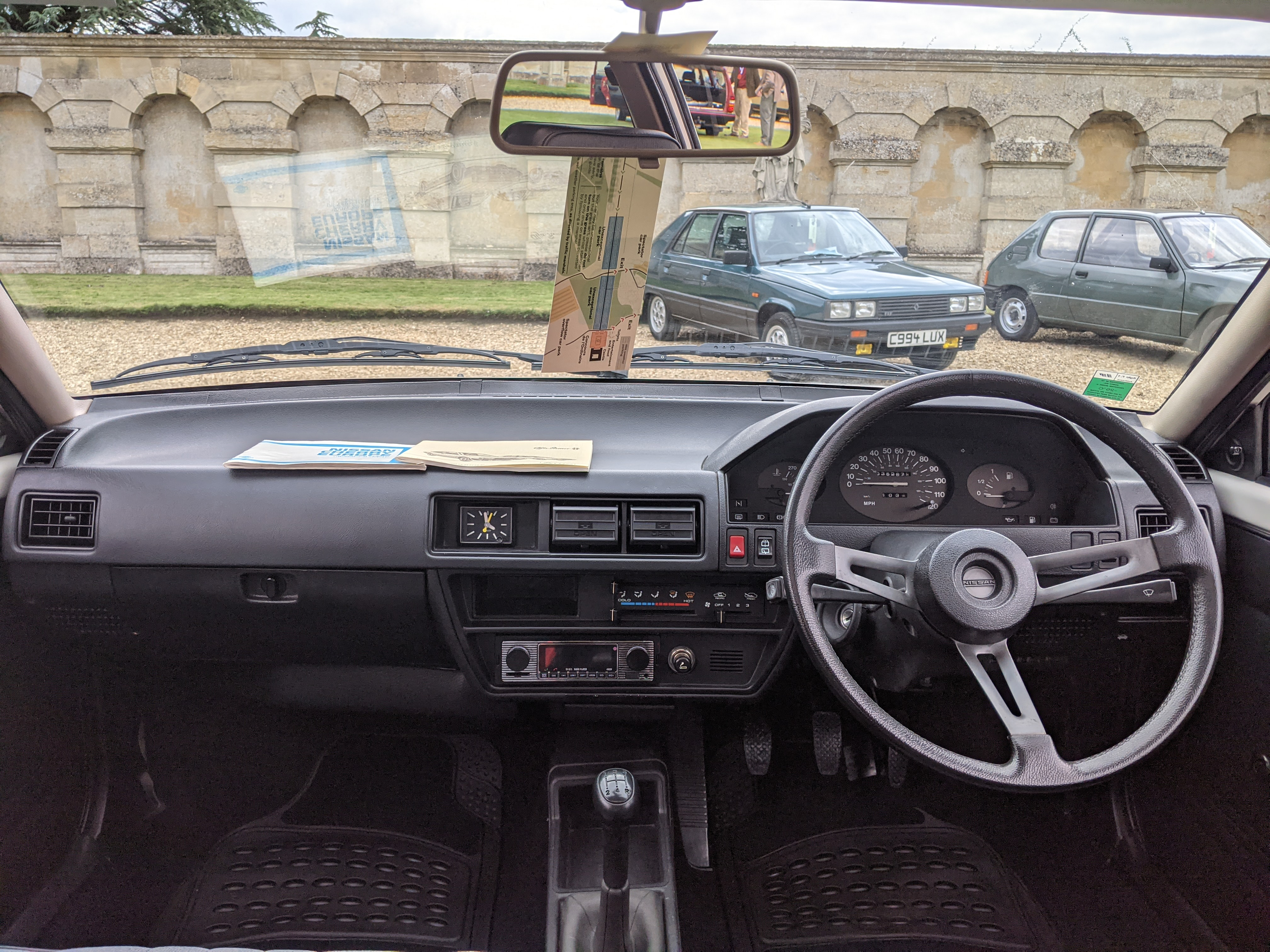
Interior

The Cherry name was still used in Europe on the model N12, an angular, three- or five-door hatchback design which was introduced in September 1982. The new model was somewhat larger than earlier versions of the Cherry, with the new Micra taking its place in the supermini sector on its European launch in June 1983, leaving the Cherry to compete in Europe against the new-popular hatchback designs like the Ford Escort and Volkswagen Golf, while the Sunny gave buyers a traditional saloon and estate option. Wheelbase and track all increased by about 20 mm (0.8 in).

While being somewhat larger, Nissan lowered the weight of the car by the new E-series engines being lighter than the ones used in the previous model, and through the extensive use of high-strength low-alloy steel (HSLA) as well. Further improving fuel economy were much improved aerodynamics, although at drag coefficient of Cd=0.38 they were no more than average for the segment. Occupant comfort was also improved through better seats and a redesigned suspension. Sound levels dropped as a result of the improved aerodynamics, advancements in door seal technology, and the use of a sandwiched firewall. An interesting feature was that the three-door's rear windows could be opened with two levers on the center console; these controlled the child safe rear locks on five-door versions.

A special model mainly sold in Europe was the one-litre E10-engined version. This was sold where tax regulations suited smaller engines, and was usually only offered with the lowest (DX) trim and a four-speed manual transmission. The little 1-litre engine had a higher fuel consumption figures than either the 1.3 or the 1.5, as it had to work a lot harder to keep up with traffic. A diesel model arrived in export markets in early 1983. In 1985 Belgian buyers also received a special edition combining the Japanese and the European names called the "Cherry Pulsar." This was a three-door Cherry DX 1.3 or 1.7 Diesel fitted with some extra equipment and painted light blue or silver metallic.

The turbocharged 1.5-litre model produces 114 PS (84 kW) at 5600 rpm in European trim.

A derivative of Cherry N12 was also built by Alfa Romeo at Pratola Serra, near Naples, Italy. The Alfa-built version was badged as the Alfa Romeo Arna but in the United Kingdom and Spain it was available through Nissan Dealers badged as the Nissan Cherry Europe. The Cherry Europe was only available as a three-door in two varieties; the base model 1.2 SL and a later performance version, the 1.5 GTi. It is distinguishable externally by slightly different rear light clusters and other minor changes. Under the skin it used Alfa Romeo Alfasud-based components including the engine, transmission, and front suspension. Rear suspension, brakes and the majority of body panel pressings came from Japan. Arna was an acronym meaning Alfa Romeo Nissan Autoveicoli. The Arna did not sell well and the partnership was not continued after the car's demise in 1987.

The Arna was never sold in Japan but a domestic version of the N12 Nissan Pulsar, labelled the Nissan Pulsar Milano X1, made use of the Alfa Romeo connection in its publicity and was fitted with the same black and green interior as the Arna Ti or Cherry Europe GTi. The model was entirely N12 based though and featured the normal, transversely mounted Nissan E engine.

After the end of Cherry production, the Sunny was Nissan's only offering of this size in Europe, with the range launched in the autumn of 1986 including a hatchback as well as a saloon and the estate model carried over from the previous Sunny range. In America only the notchback coupé ("Pulsar NX") was offered for most of the N12's run although the three- and five-doors were sold for model year 1983 only.

== Replacement by Nissan Sunny ==
In most export markets, the Nissan Sunny name replaced the Cherry starting with the N13 Pulsar model. In certain markets such as Greece, however, the N13 Pulsar retained the "Cherry" nameplate.

In Japan and some Asian markets, the Pulsar name was used until the N15 model.
