= Yttilä =

Village in Finland

Coordinates: 61°06′40″N 22°22′36″E

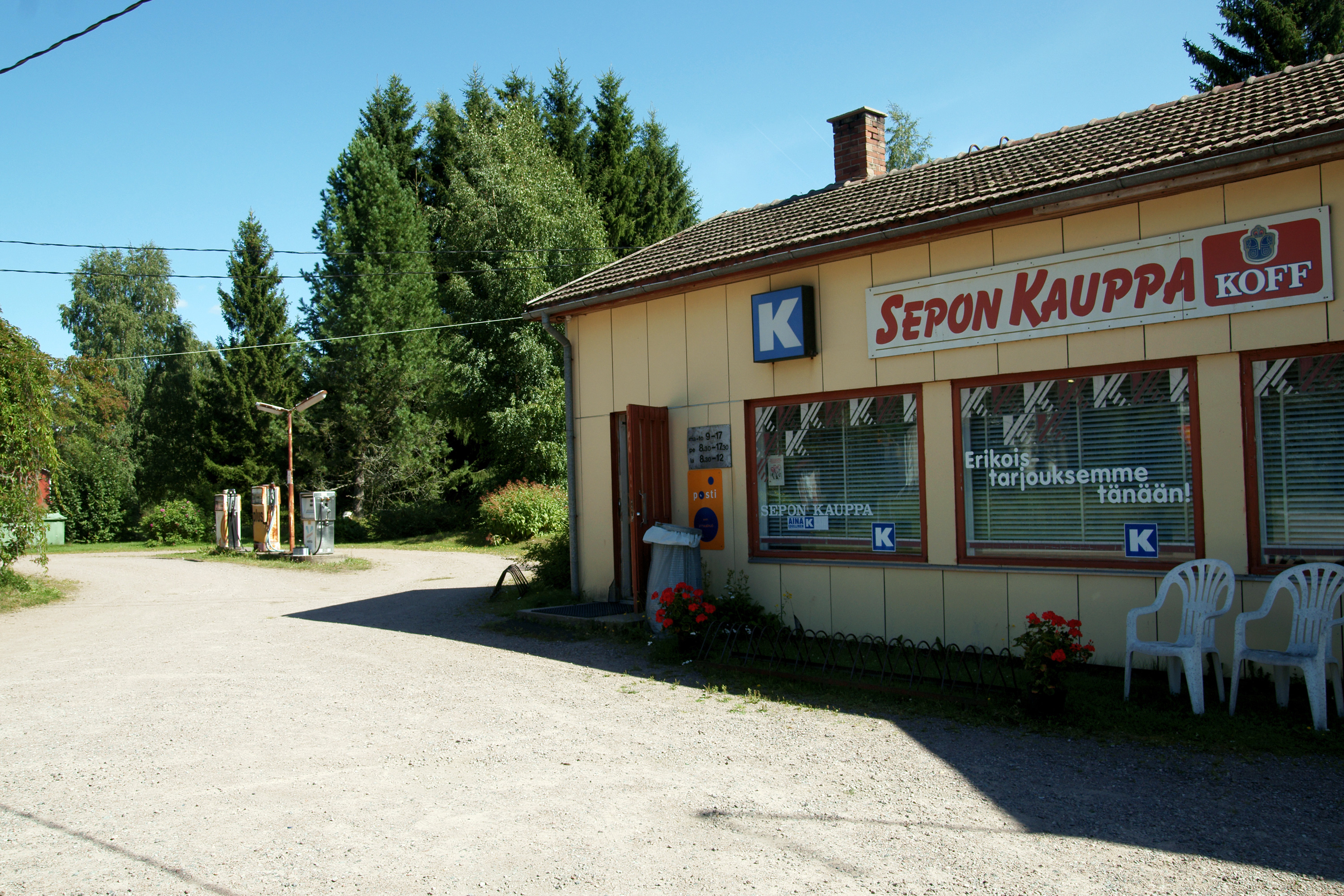
Sepon Kauppa shop and service station in August 2011.

Yttilä (Finnish pronunciation: [ˈytːilæ]) is a village in the municipality of Säkylä, in the Satakunta region of Finland, on the territory of the former municipality of Köyliö. It is located on the eastern shore of the lake Köyliönjärvi.

== Etymology ==
According to Ralf Saxén (1905), the name of Yttilä is derived from an old Scandinavian given name Ytti. Seppo Suvanto (1987) instead suggests that the name is derived from a contraction of a native Finnish name Yletty, as an old farm in Tyrvää named Yletty also appears in old church records as Yty, Yti or Yttj. A village named Yttilä is also found in Kauvatsa (now part of Kokemäki).

== Cultural references ==
The video game My Summer Car features a fictional village shop named Teimon Kauppa which bears a strong resemblance to former village store Sepon Kauppa (lit. Seppo's Shop; closed in 2014) located in Yttilä. Developer Johannes Rojola confirmed the shop was used as inspiration in 2017.
