= Rupriikki Media Museum =

- Mediamuseo Rupriikki
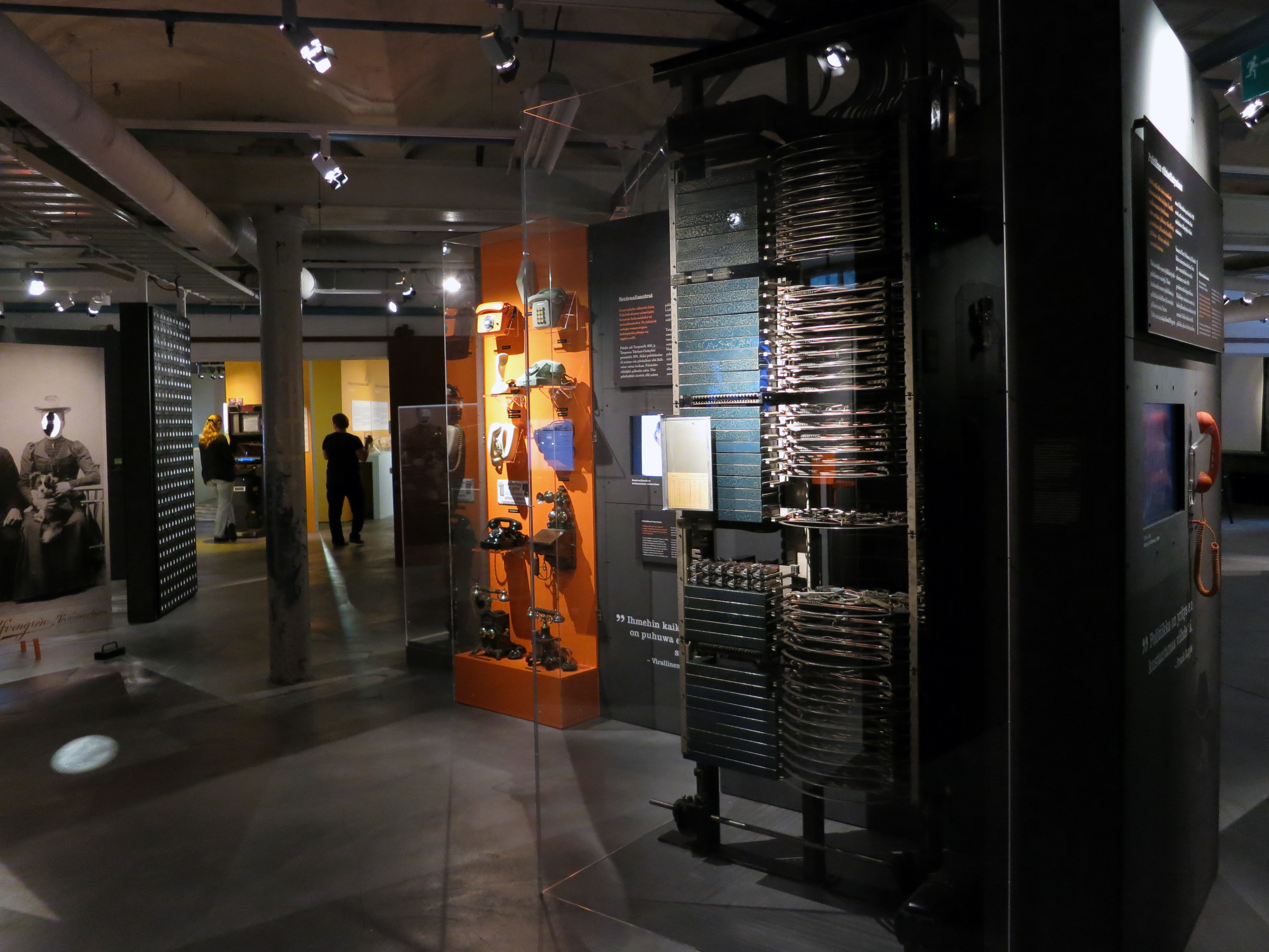
- Exhibition at the museum
- Established: 2001
- Location: Vapriikki Museum Centre, Tampere, Finland
- Coordinates: 61.501944°N 23.759722°E
- Type: Media history museum
- Visitors: ~25 900 (2012)
- Curator: Outi Penninkangas
- Website: vapriikki.fi/en/nayttelyt/mediamuseo-rupriikki/

The Rupriikki Media Museum (Finnish: Mediamuseo Rupriikki) is a history museum devoted to mass communication. It is located in the Vapriikki Museum Centre, in Tampere, Finland. Rupriikki showcases media history. Collections include cellular phones, radios, telephones, computers, and press materials.

== History ==
The museum was created in 2001 when the City of Tampere, the University of Tampere, telephone company Elisa and newspaper Aamulehti partnered together. The museum opened in 2003.

== Exhibitions ==
The museum has a permanent exhibition about the history of mass communication. It is broken up into thematic sections. The exhibition "Messages from Pirkanmaa" focuses on the development of mass communication, including newspapers, radio, television, and digital games. "Networked Humanity" is a story of networking and its evolution throughout time. "The Gaming Man" is an exhibition on the long history of games and playing.

Moreover, Rupriikki's new exhibition approaches media phenomena through devices that visitors can try out or play with.

In the past, Rupriikki also had rotating exhibitions. They had an exhibition about Commodore computers in 2006. The exhibition featured ten working Commodores which visitors could play. The museum also had an exhibition celebrating the tenth anniversary of the MindTrek conference.

== Collections ==
At the time of the museum's opening, the majority of the IT objects were donated by the local computer club.
