= Natural History Museum of Tampere =

Museum in Tampere, Finland

Coordinates: 61.5031°N 23.7603°E

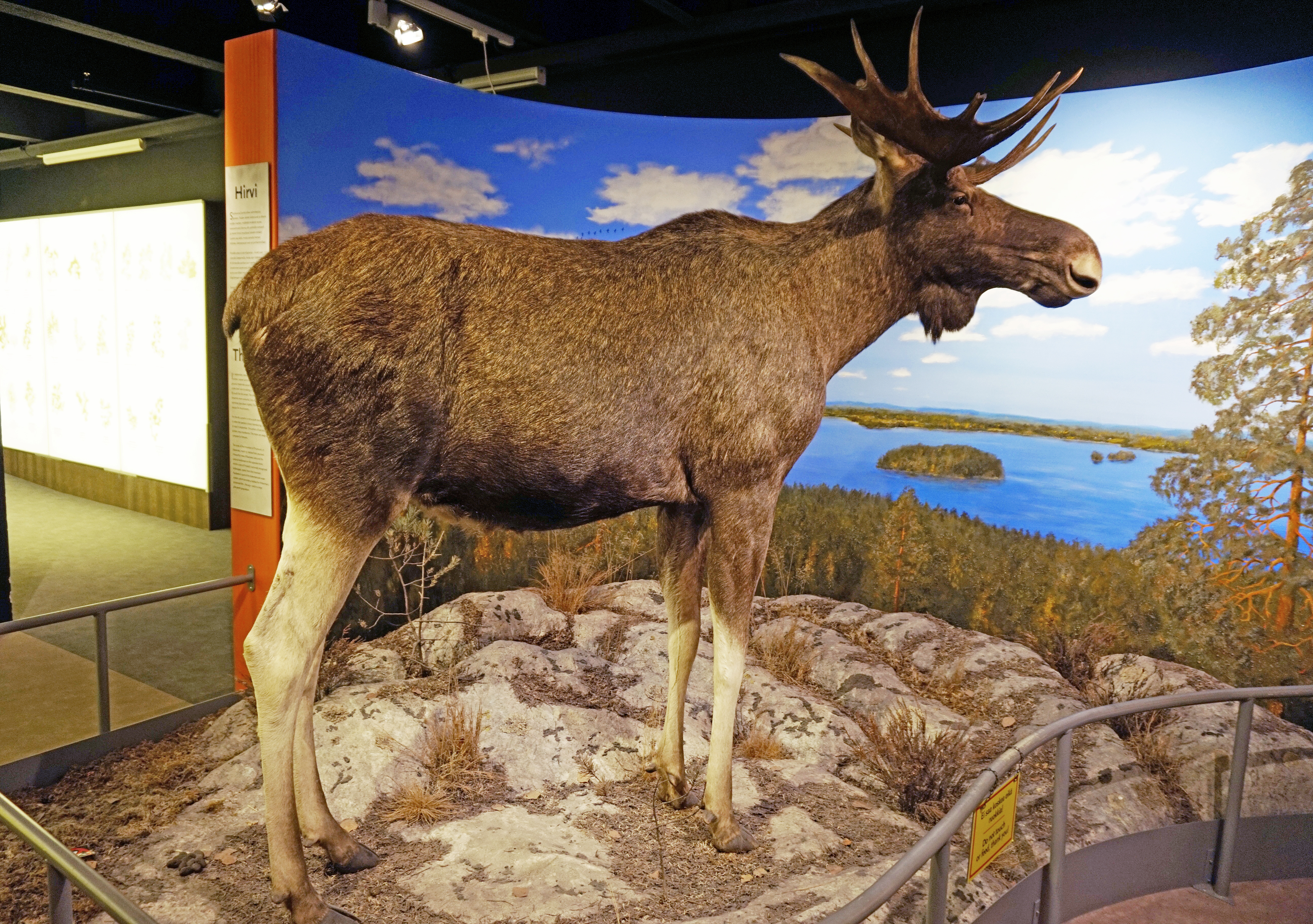
Tampere Natural History Museum

Tampere Natural History Museum is a natural history museum in Tampere, Finland. It is based in the Vapriikki Museum Centre. It shows animals of Pirkanmaa region. The Tampere Museum of Natural History was first opened in 1961. Before that there were temporary exhibitions of the local nature for the people of Tampere. The oldest parts of the museum's collections are now more than 150 years old.

In 1988 the museum moved to the same building as the new Tampere City Library, but was later closed in 1995. The collections were later moved to the Vapriikki Museum Centre. The museum holds a collection of over 250,000 exhibits.
