= Catching Features =

- Icon Startup screen (Demo version)
- Developer: Greg Walker
- Publisher: Biggins Game Programming
- Engine: DirectX
- Platforms: Windows (or WINE/CrossOver on Linux, Mac)
- Release: WW: March 9, 2017
- Genre: Sports/Simulation
- Modes: single-player, multiplayer

Catching Features is a sports simulation video game developed for the sport of orienteering.

Several different modes of play are available. Individual courses are run with interval starts against computer opponents, or with a mass start against many of them. Relay events allow you to run one leg of a forked relay course.

A random map generator allows players to create a potentially unlimited number of maps and courses. Each completed course awards ranking points based on performance relative to other participants. Accumulated points can be used to unlock additional events.
