= Säkylä =

- Municipality
- Säkylän kunta Säkylä kommun
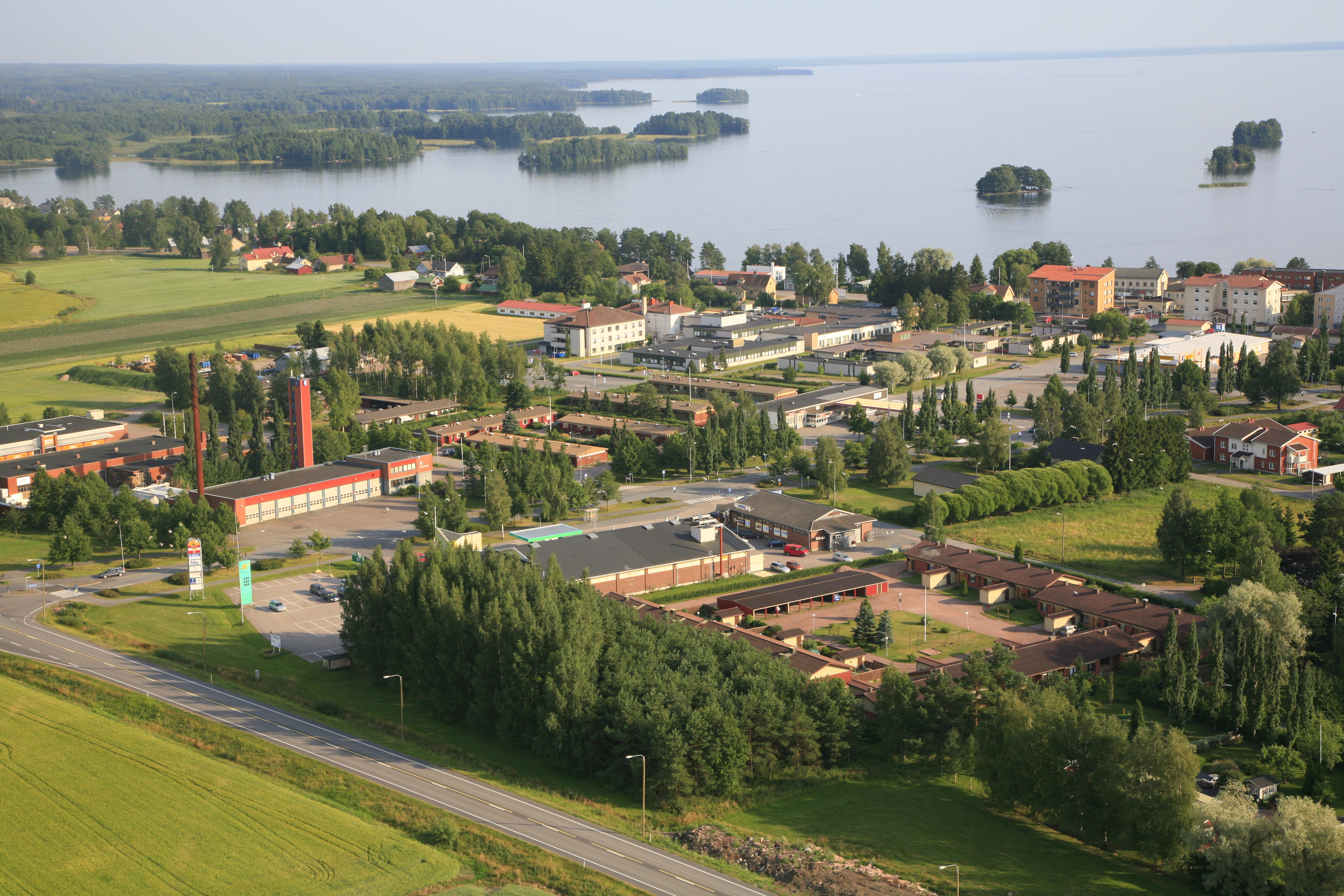
- Säkylä centre

- Coat of arms

- Location of Säkylä in Finland
- Interactive map of Säkylä
- Coordinates: 61°03′N 022°21′E
- Country: Finland
- Region: Satakunta
- Sub-region: Rauma
- Charter: 1869

Government
  - Municipality manager: Teijo Mäenpää

Area (2018-01-01)
  - Total: 527.71 km^{2} (203.75 sq mi)
  - Land: 406.85 km^{2} (157.09 sq mi)
  - Water: 107.89 km^{2} (41.66 sq mi)
  - Rank: 202nd largest in Finland

Population (2025-12-31)
  - Total: 6,221
  - Rank: 148th largest in Finland
  - Density: 15.29/km^{2} (39.6/sq mi)

Population by native language
  - Finnish: 94% (official)
  - Swedish: 0.3%
  - Others: 5.7%

Population by age
  - 0 to 14: 12.9%
  - 15 to 64: 55.3%
  - 65 or older: 31.8%
- Time zone: UTC+02:00 (EET)
  - Summer (DST): UTC+03:00 (EEST)
- Climate: Dfc
- Website: www.sakyla.fi/en/

Säkylä (Finnish pronunciation: [ˈsækylæ]) is a municipality of Finland. It is located in the Satakunta region, 65 kilometres (40 mi) southeast of the city of Pori. The municipality has a population of 6,221 (31 December 2025) and the municipality covers an area of 527.71 square kilometres (203.75 sq mi) of which 107.89 square kilometres (41.66 sq mi) is inland water (2018-01-01). The population density is 15 inhabitants per square kilometre (39/sq mi) (31 December 2025). The municipality is unilingually Finnish.

Säkylä is known as the home of the Pori Brigade of the Finnish Defence Forces and for the large food industry.

The municipality of Köyliö was merged to Säkylä on 1 January 2016.

== Economy ==
The biggest employers are the Säkylä Garrison of the Pori Brigade, Lännen Tehtaat Plc, Broilertalo Oy, the Municipality of Säkylä, the Intermunicipal Federation of Public Health, and Sucros Säkylä.

== Nature ==
For its diversity of nature, Säkylä has a special position among Finnish municipalities. Säkylä's Lake Pyhäjärvi (Säkylän Pyhäjärvi), situated mainly in the area of Säkylä, is the biggest lake in southwestern Finland. It is renowned for its clean and clear water and big yields of fish, and the maintenance of its natural state is secured by the common efforts of the inhabitants, the municipality, and local industry. The ecology of the lake is sensitive to disturbances and therefore its condition is closely monitored, which is why Pyhäjärvi is one of the most studied lakes in Europe. Insects found nowhere else in Finland live on the Säkylänharju Ridge. The fauna and flora of the ridge include several other rare and threatened species.

Lake Pyhäjärvi is a bird lake. During the year, many of the water and shore birds of the Finnish inland waters are found there. The nesting species include lake birds drawn to the barren shores and clear waters, as well as some species from eutrophic bird bays.

== Culture ==
Säkylä is the original home of the Antti farmstead, nowadays a museum object in the Seurasaari Open Air Museum in Helsinki. According to Traficom, Säkylä is the second most motorized municipality in Finland with 651 cars per thousand inhabitants.

The whitefish soup was named traditional dish of the Säkylä parish in the 1980s.

== Notable people ==
- Toivo Aalto-Setälä (1896–1977)
- Emil Cedercreutz (1879–1949)
- Harri Eloranta (born 1963)
- Wilho Laine (1875–1918)
- Petteri Orpo (born 1969)
- Jutta Rantala (born 1999)
- Petteri Summanen (born 1969)

== See also ==
- Yttilä, a village of Säkylä
