= Finnish Museum of Games =

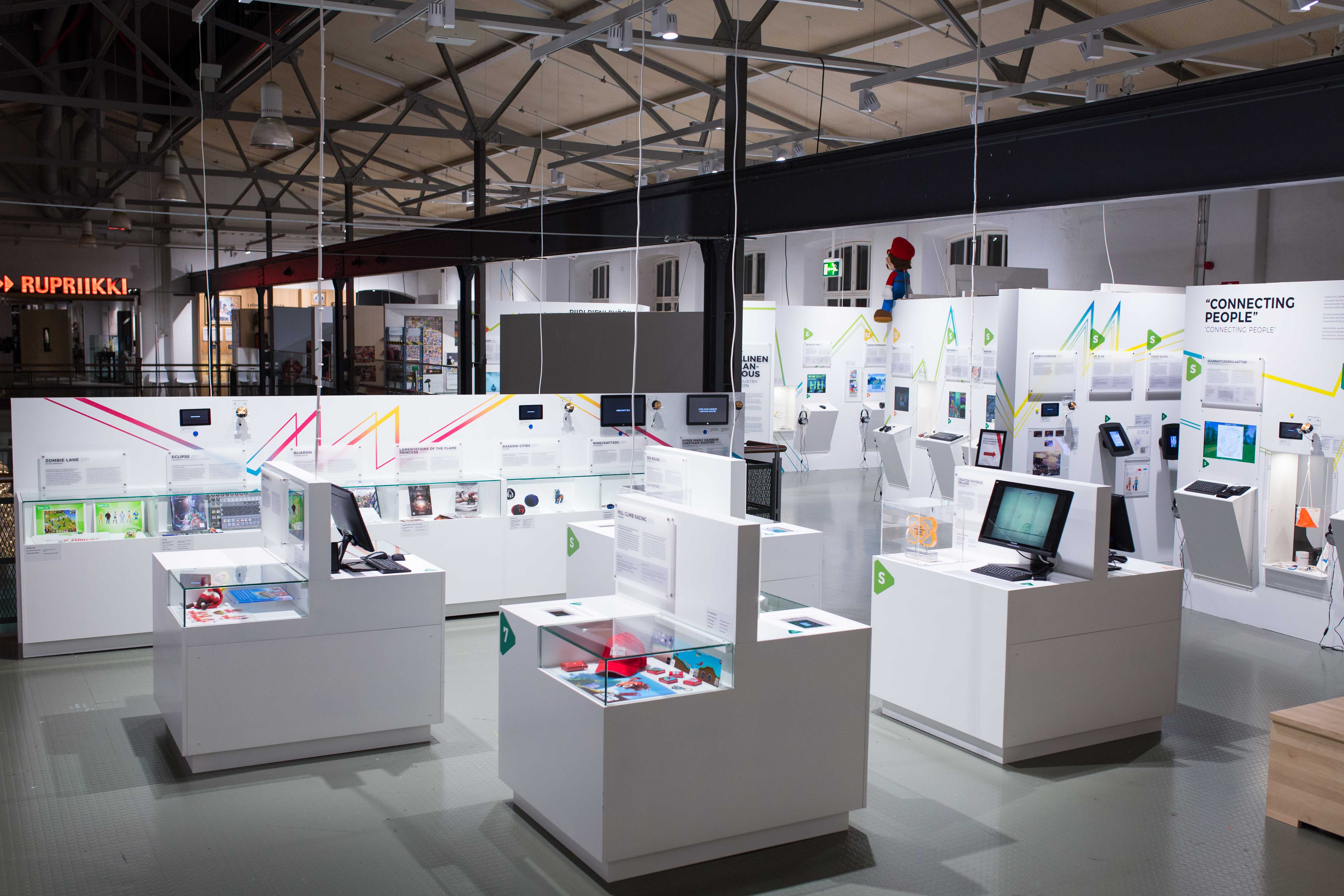
- Established: 2017
- Location: Vapriikki Museum Centre, Tampere, Finland
- Coordinates: 61.501944°N 23.759722°E
- Type: Game history museum
- Website: www.vapriikki.fi/nayttelyt/suomen-pelimuseo-nayttelyt/

The Finnish Museum of Games (Finnish: Suomen pelimuseo) is a museum dedicated to the history of Finnish games located in Vapriikki Museum Centre in Tampere, Finland.

The museum opened in January 2017. By the end of June 2017, over 100,000 people had visited the museum.

== Exposition ==
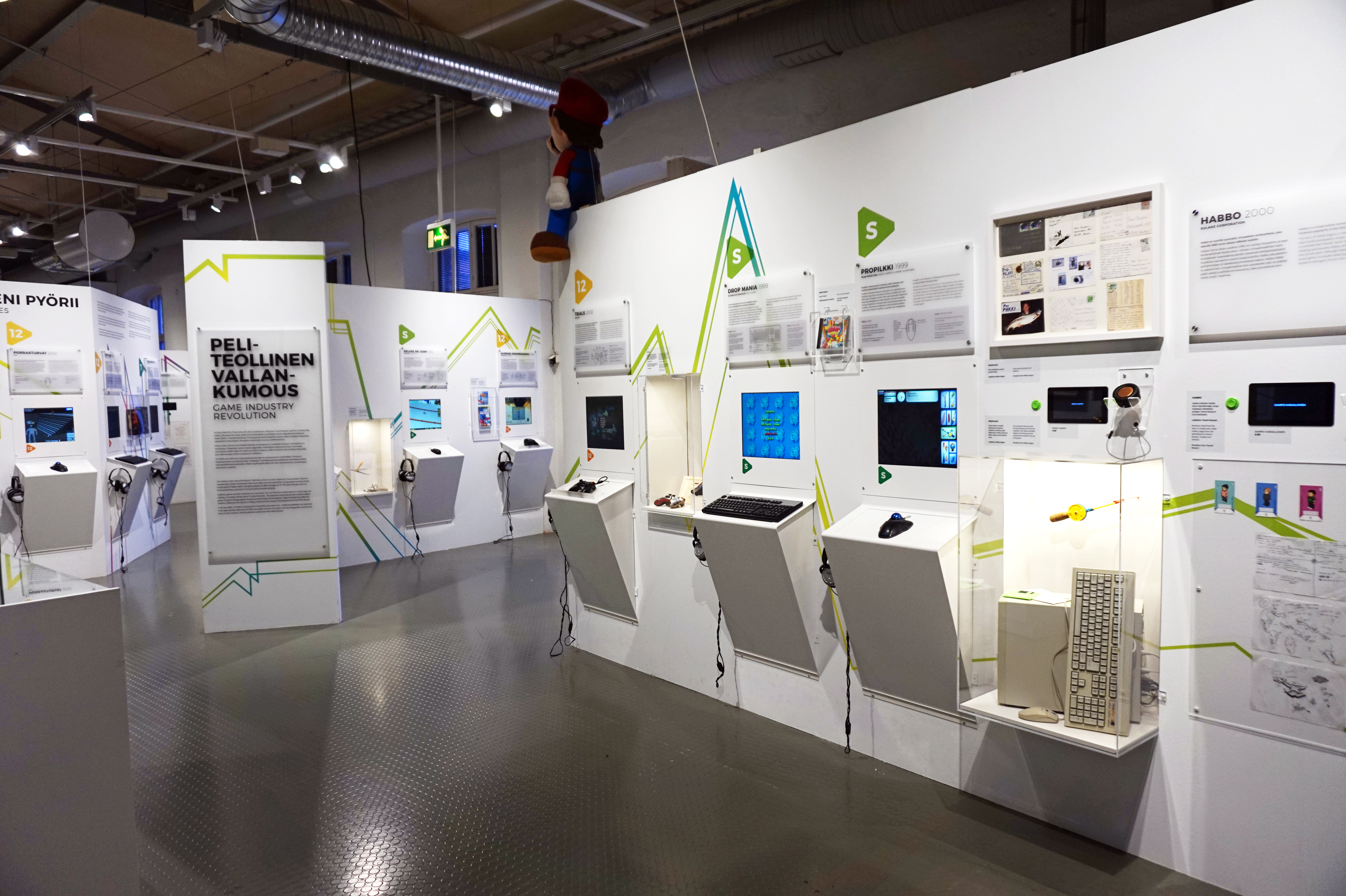
Interactive gaming stands exposition

The museum exhibition consists of 100 Finnish games, six thematic period rooms, a video game arcade and a changing exhibition space. Overall, the museum has around 85 playable digital games. Museum also interviewed over 40 game developers, recording each as a half-hour long video, and published on YouTube short versions of these interviews.

The museum was created with the help of a crowdfunding campaign arranged in 2015. The crowdfunding campaign raised €85,860 from 1,120 backers. Major backers included game companies Supercell, Housemarque and Colossal Order.

In addition to digital games, the Finnish Museum of Games also collects and exhibits board games, card games, miniature games, roleplaying games and LARPs.

Changing exhibitions have dealt with personal play histories, the role-playing convention Ropecon, the development of the virtual reality game P.O.L.L.E.N. and pixel art.

External videos
- 1 Playlist and 3 Videos
- Interviewing Game Makers (playlist, 40 videos)
- Interview: Antero Pulli and Suunnistussimulaattori ("Orienteering Simulator")
- Antero Pulli's virtual orienteering training
- Suunnistussimulaattori Season 2015-16 preview

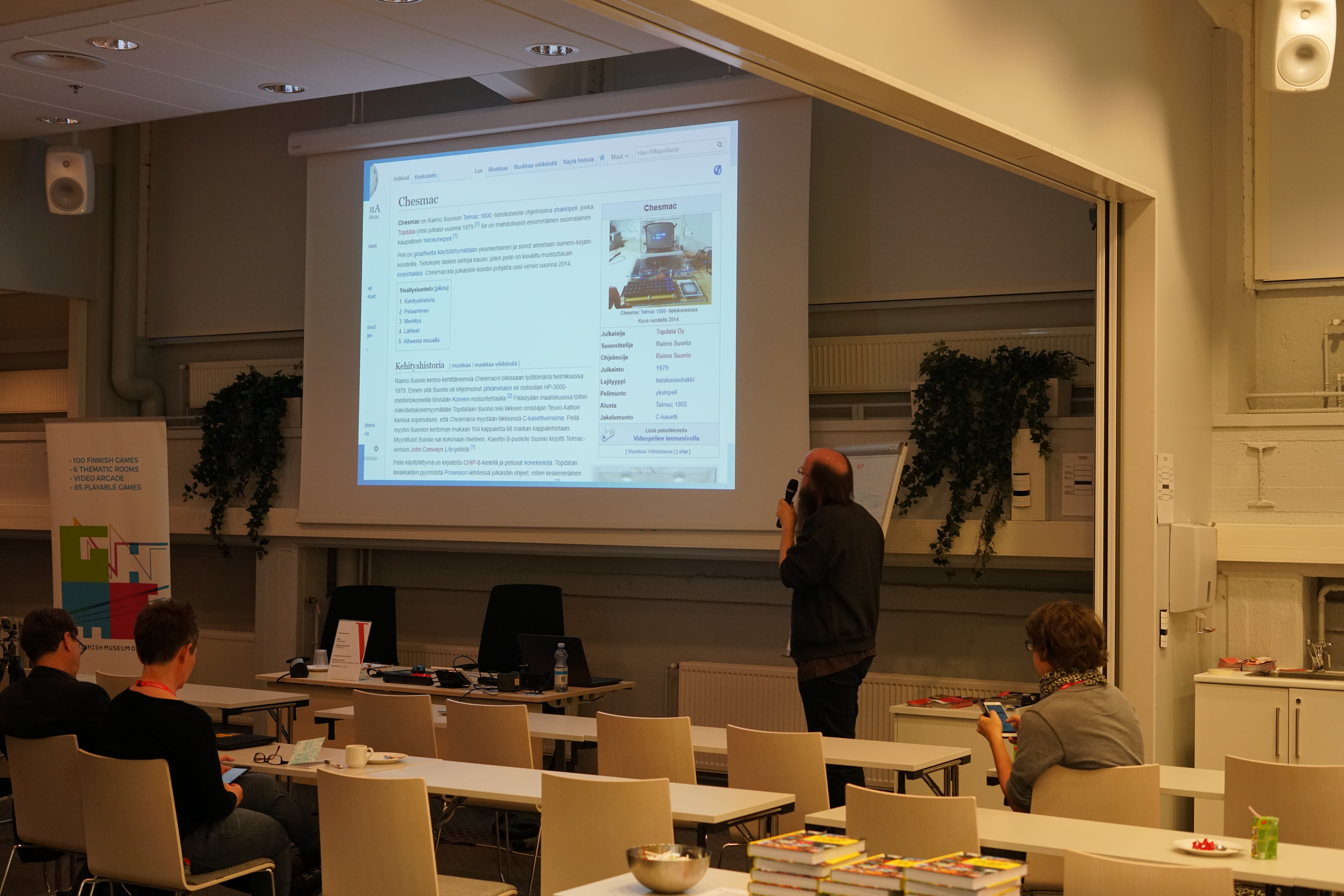
Wikipedia talk in the 1st «Collaborative Game Histories» seminar and workshop

Among interactive stands there is a stand of the 3D cooperative sports video game Suunnistussimulaattori (lit. 'Orienteering Simulator'), where museum visitors can make a virtual trip to observe landscapes of Finland running with virtual orienteering map and compass. This game has been used by Finnish and other orienteering athletes for virtual training (as an alternative to Catching Features), but development of this game stopped in 2016. Also on the Suunnistussimulaattori stand behind the glass there are real orienteering sport equipment and game souvenirs, presented to museum by Antero Pulli, developer of the original game and Finnish orienteering athlete.

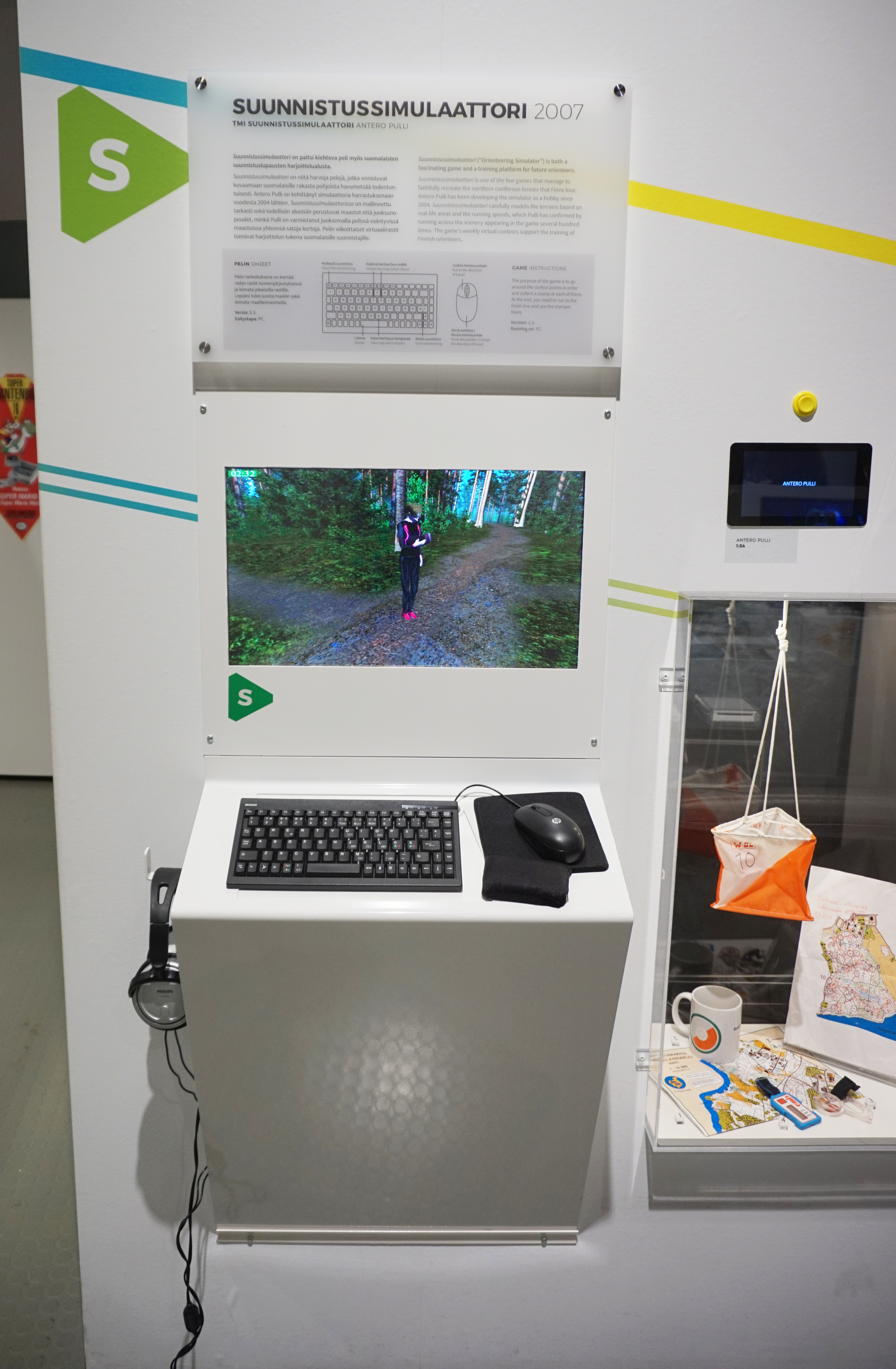
The Suunnistussimulaattori interactive gaming stand

== Awards ==
- In April 2017, the museum was awarded the Sensation of the Year award at the Finnish Game Awards.
- In 2018, the Society for the History of Technology awarded the Finnish Museum of Games with the Dibner Award for Excellence in Museum Exhibits.

== Citations ==
- "Verkko palvelee suunnistajaa" [Network helps orienteering sport] (PDF), Pärahdus (in Finnish), p. 9, 2009
- Antero, Pulli (2 September 2013), Suunnistussimulaattori: Suomalainen suunnistuspeli [Suunnistussimulaattori: Finnish orienteering simulator] (PDF) (in Finnish)
- Huhtinen, Petri (2 December 2016). Suomen pelimuseon joukkorahoittajien vip-tilaisuus [VIP event for crowdfunding at the Finnish Museum of Games] (JPG) (in Finnish). Tampere: Museokeskus Vapriikki. Archived from the original on 1 January 2024 – via Finna.fi. "Lapsi pelaa Pelimuseon suunnistussimulaattorilla. = The child plays with the Museum of Games' orienteering simulator."
- Nylund, Niklas (2017), "Preserving Game Heritage with Video Interviews" (PDF), Finskt Museum 2017, vol. 124, Finskt Museum (published 27 June 2017)
- Nylund, Niklas (2020), Game Heritage: Digital Games in Museum Collections and Exhibitions (PDF), Tampere University, ISBN 978-952-03-1697-6
