= Alfa Romeo Sprint =

Alfa Romeo Alfasud Sprint Alfa Romeo Sprint
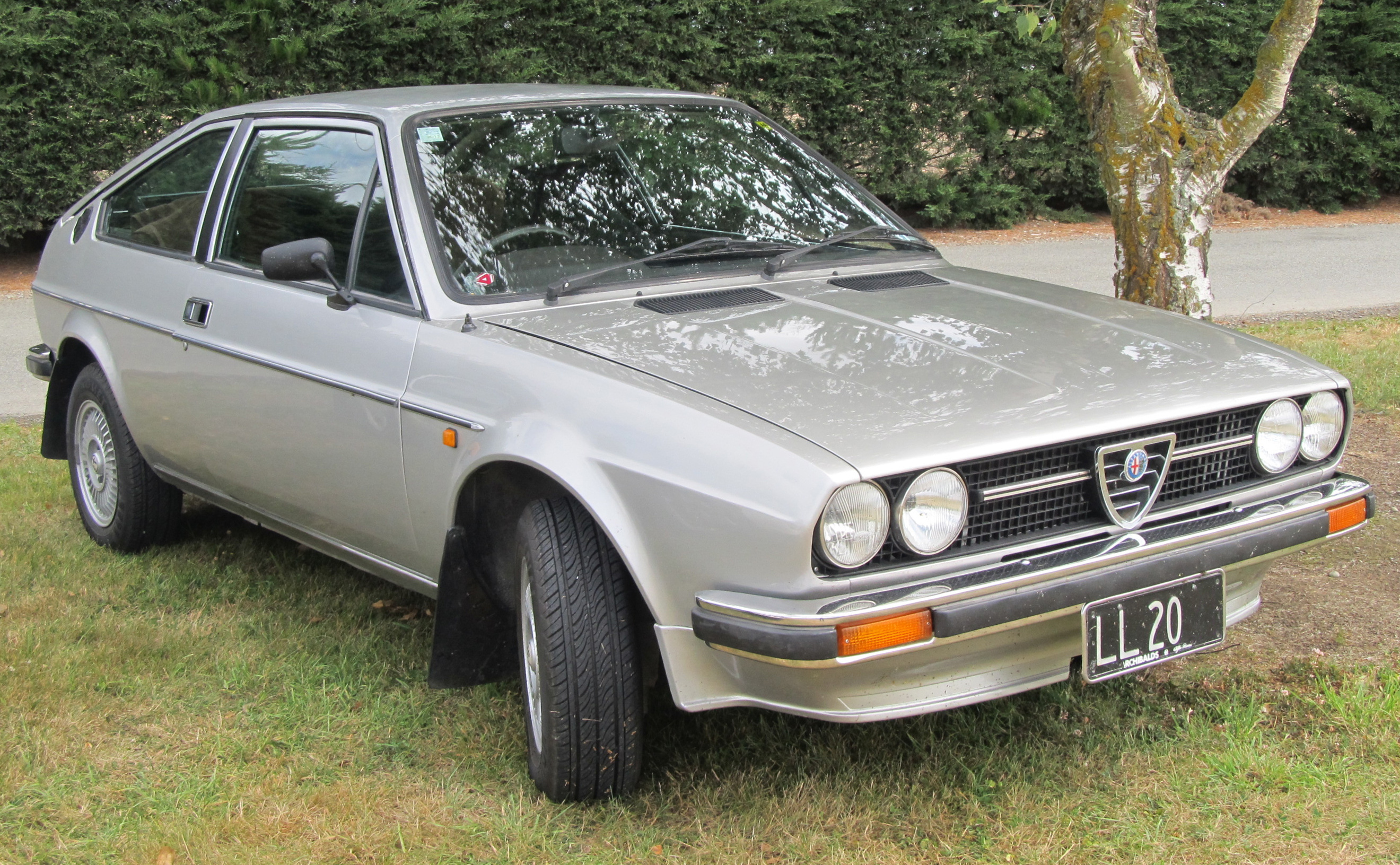
- 1978–1983 Alfasud Sprint

Overview
- Manufacturer: Alfa Romeo
- Production: 1976–1989
- Assembly: Italy: Pomigliano d'Arco; South Africa: Brits, North West
- Designer: Giorgetto Giugiaro at Italdesign

Body and chassis
- Body style: 3-door coupé
- Layout: Front-engine, front-wheel-drive
- Related: Alfa Romeo Alfasud; Alfa Romeo 33; Giocattolo

Powertrain
- Engine: Petrol: 1.2 L Boxer H4; 1.3 L Boxer H4; 1.5 L Boxer H4; 1.7 L Boxer H4
- Transmission: 5-speed manual

Dimensions
- Wheelbase: 2,455 mm (96.7 in)
- Length: 4,019–4,024 mm (158.2–158.4 in)
- Width: 1,610–1,620 mm (63–64 in)
- Height: 1,305–1,297 mm (51.4–51.1 in)
- Curb weight: 915 kg (2,017 lb)

Chronology
- Predecessor: Alfa Romeo GT Junior
- Successor: Alfa Romeo GT

The Alfa Romeo Alfasud Sprint (later only Alfa Romeo Sprint) is a boxer-engined coupé produced by the Italian manufacturer Alfa Romeo from 1976 to 1989, and based on the Alfa Romeo Alfasud. 116,552 units of the Alfasud Sprint and Sprint were built in total. The Sprint was sold in Europe, South Africa, Australia, and New Zealand.

== History ==
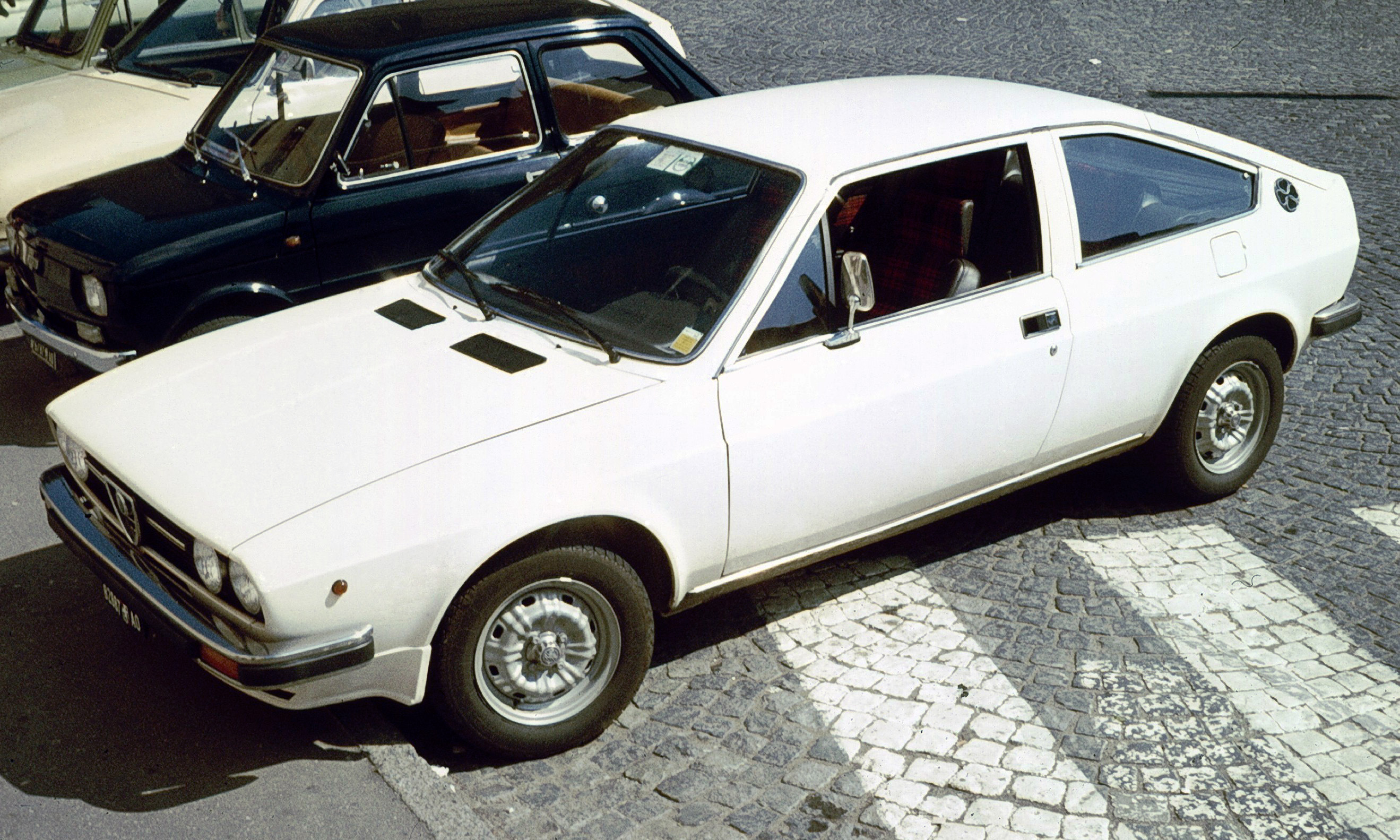
1976–1978 Alfasud Sprint

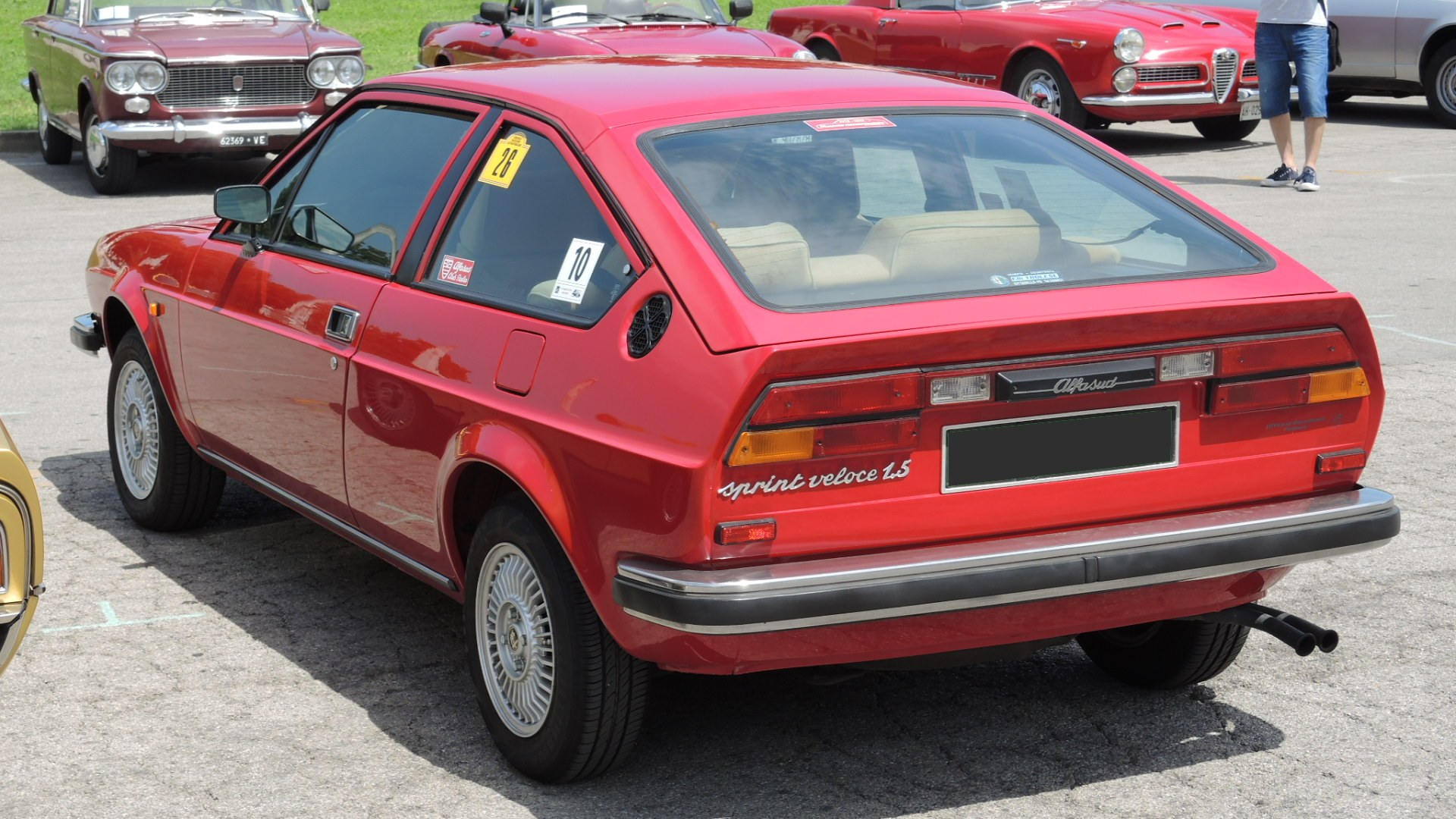
1979–1983 Alfasud Sprint Veloce rear

=== 1976–1983: Alfasud Sprint ===
The Alfasud Sprint was presented to the press in September 1976 in Baia Domizia (Caserta), and shown at the Turin Motor Show in November. Designed by Giorgetto Giugiaro like the Alfasud, whose mechanicals it was based on, it had a lower, more angular design, featuring a hatchback (although no folding rear seats). The Alfasud Sprint was assembled together with the Alfasud in the Pomigliano d'Arco plant, located in southern Italy—hence the original "Sud" moniker, which means south in Italian. Under the Alfasud Sprint's bonnet there was a new version of the Alfasud's 1186 cc four-cylinder boxer engine, stroked to displace 1,286 cc (78 cu in), fed by a twin-choke carburetor and developing 76 PS (56 kW; 75 hp) at 6,000 rpm. Mated to the flat-four was a five-speed, all-synchromesh gearbox. The interior was upholstered in dark brown Texalfa leatherette and tartan cloth. Options were limited to alloy wheels, a quartz clock and metallic paint.

In May 1978 the Alfasud Sprint underwent its first updates, both cosmetic and technical. Engine choice was enlarged to two boxers, shared with the renewed Alfasud ti, a 79 PS (58 kW; 78 hp) 1.3 (1,350 cc) and an 85 PS (63 kW; 84 hp) 1.5 (1,490 cc); the earlier 1186 cc units was not offered anymore, remaining exclusive to the Alfasud. Outside many exterior details were changed from chrome to matte black stainless steel or plastic, such as the wing mirrors, window surrounds and C-pillar ornaments; the B-pillar also received a black finish, the side repeaters changed position and became square, and the front turn signals switched from white to amber lenses. In the cabin the seats had more pronounced bolsters and were upholstered in a new camel-coloured fabric. Just one year later, in June 1979, another engine update arrived and the Alfasud Sprint became the Alfasud Sprint Veloce. Thanks to double twin-choke carburetors (each choke feeding a single cylinder) and a higher compression ratio engine output increased to 86 PS (63 kW; 85 hp) and 95 PS (70 kW; 94 hp), respectively for the 1.3 and 1.5.

=== 1983–1989: Sprint ===
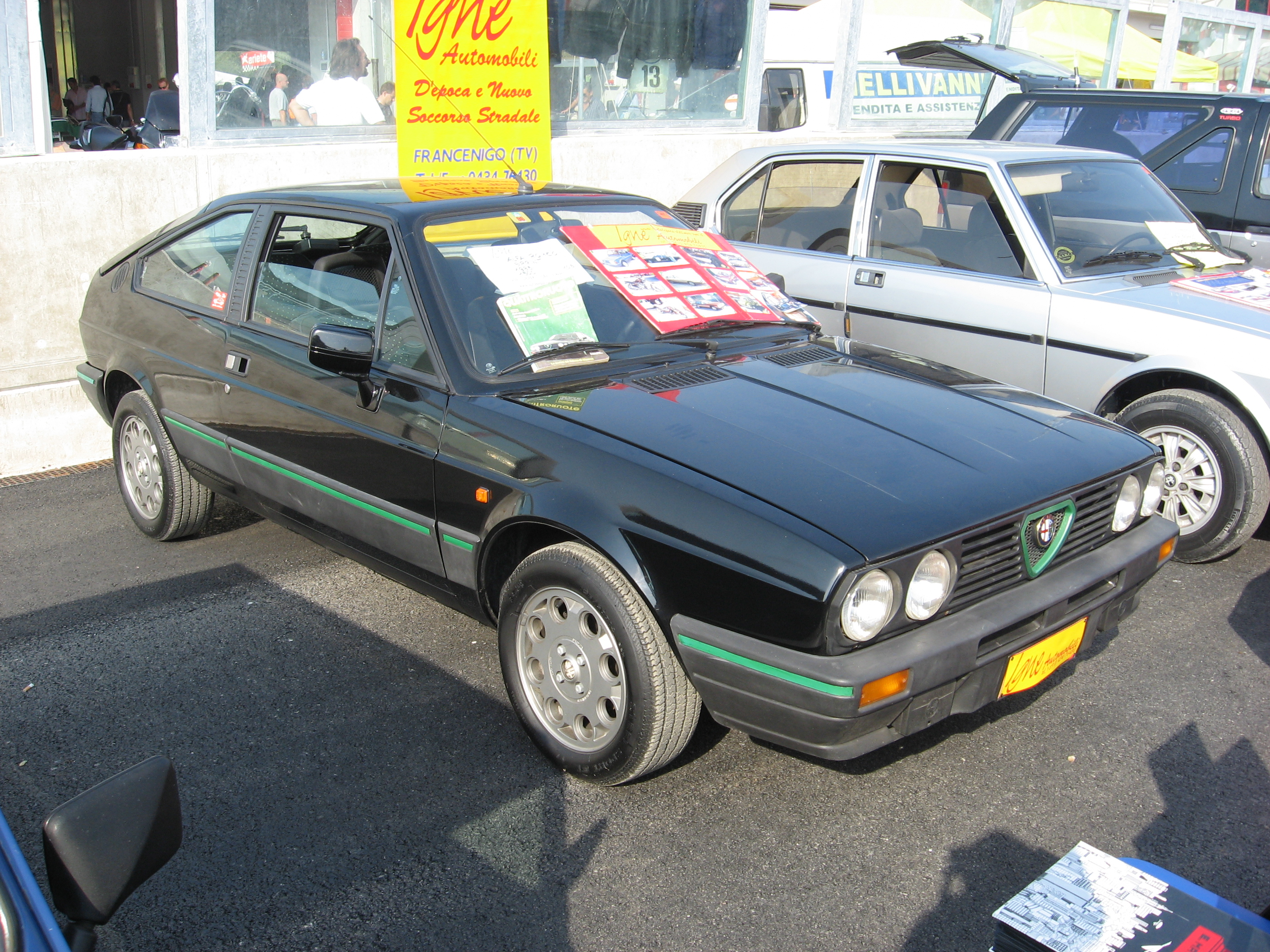
Alfa Romeo Sprint 1.7 Quadrifoglio Verde (1983–1987)

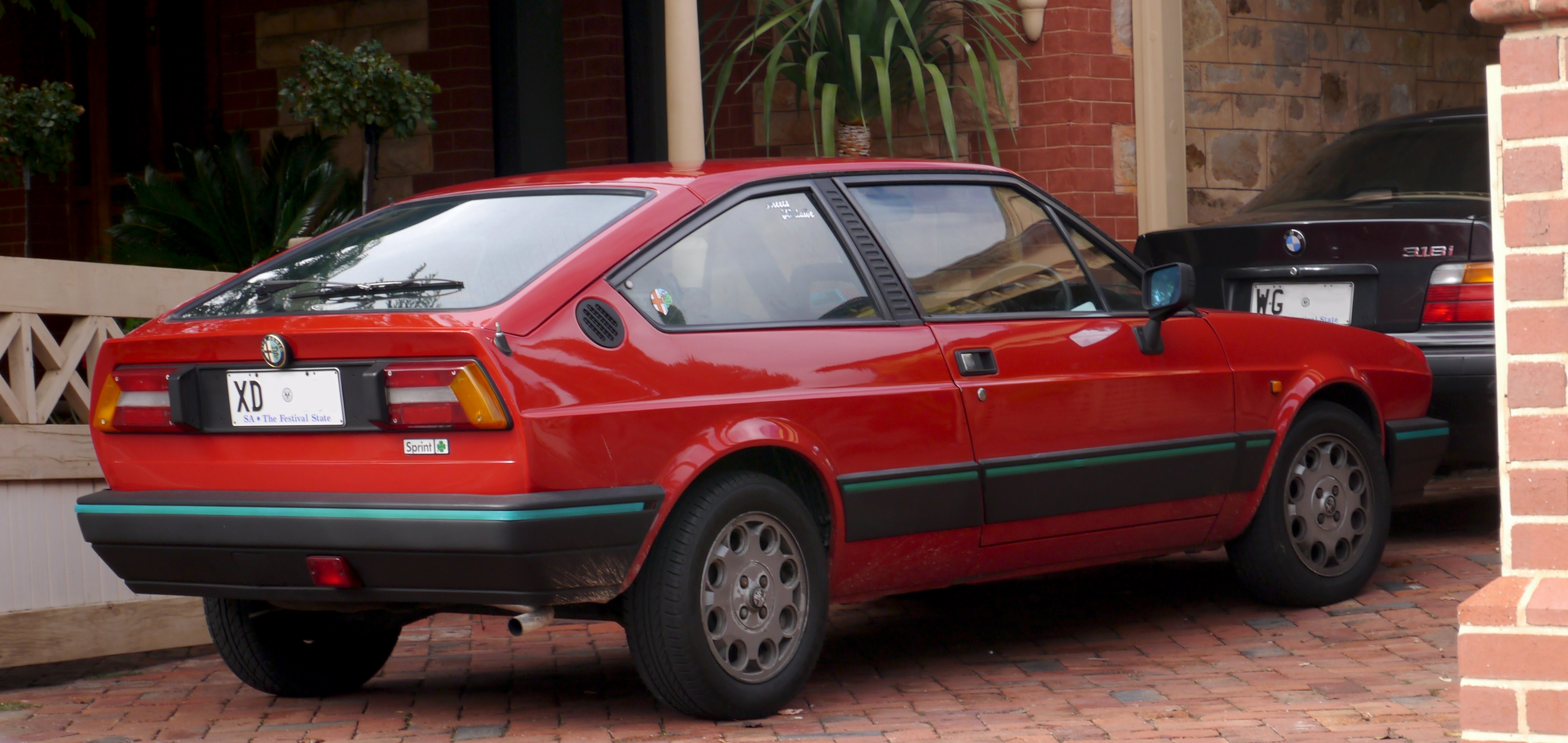
Alfa Romeo Sprint rear

In February 1983 Alfa Romeo updated all of its sports cars; the Sprint received a major facelift. Thereafter the Alfasud prefix and Veloce suffix were abandoned, and the car was known as Alfa Romeo Sprint; this also in view of the release of the Alfa Romeo 33, which a few months later replaced the Alfasud family hatchback. The Sprint initially kept the platform of the earlier Sprint with inboard brakes, but updated body details described below. This model was sold from 1983 in its markets & in Australia only until late 1984. It later received a platform upgrade, which was now the same as that of the Alfa Romeo 33; this entailed modified front suspension, brakes mounted in the wheels instead of inboard like on the Alfasud, and drum brakes at the rear end. Three models made up the Sprint range: 1.3 and 1.5, with engines and performance unchanged from the Alfasud Sprint Veloce, and the new 1.5 Quadrifoglio Verde—1.5 Cloverleaf in the UK. The Australian market received the green striped 105 BHP model at the end of 1984 and the 95 BHP model was dropped.

A multitude of changes were involved in the stylistic refresh; there were a new grille, headlamps, wing mirrors, window surrounds and C-pillar ornaments. Bumpers went from chrome to plastic, and large plastic protective strips were added to the body sides; both sported coloured piping, which was grey for 1.3 cars, red for the 1.5 and green for the 1.5 Quadrifoglio. At the rear new trapezoidal tail light assemblies were pieced together with the license plate holder by a black plastic fascia, topped by an Alfa Romeo badge—never present on the Alfasud Sprint. In the cabin there were new seats with cloth seating surfaces and Texalfa backs, a new steering wheel and changes to elements of the dashboard and door panels. Sprint 1.3 and 1.5 came with steel wheels with black hubcaps from the Alfasud ti.

The newly introduced 1.5 Quadrifoglio Verde sport variant was shown at the March 1983 Geneva Motor Show. Its engine was the 1,490 cc carburated boxer, revised to put out 105 PS (77 kW; 104 hp) at 6,000 rpm; front brake discs were vented and the gearing shorter. In addition to the green bumper piping, also specific to the Quadrifoglio were a green instead of chrome scudetto in the front grille, a rear spoiler and 8-hole grey painted alloy wheels with metric Michelin TRX 190/55 tyres. Inside a three-spoke leather-covered steering wheel, green carpets and sport seats in black cloth with green embroidery.

In November 1987 the Sprint was updated for the last time; the 1.3 variant was carried over, while the 1.5 engine was phased out and the 1.5 QV was superseded by the 118 PS (87 kW; 116 hp) Sprint 1.7 Quadrifoglio Verde. The 1,286 cc (78 cu in) engine was directly derived from the 33 1.7 Quadrifoglio Verde, and could propel the Sprint from 0 to 100 km/h (0 to 62 mph) in 9.3 seconds; to cope with the increased engine power, the 1.7 QV adopted vented brake discs upfront. the coloured piping and side plastic strips were deleted, and the Quadrifoglio had alloy wheels of a new design. A fuel injected and 3-way Catalytic converter-equipped 1.7 variant, with an engine again derived from a 33, was added later for sale on specific markets.

There were a total of 116,552 Sprints produced during its lifespan, which lasted from 1976 to 1989. 15 of these formed the basis of the Australian-built Giocattolo sports car, which used a mid-mounted Holden 5.0 group A V8 engine. The Sprint had no direct predecessor or successor. In more recent times it found an heir in the Alfa Romeo GT, a coupé derived from the Alfa Romeo 156 and 147 - three generations newer than the Alfasud and Alfetta.

== Design ==
The 4.02 metres (158.3 in) long coupe has a very low profile and is representative of late 70s and 80s Italian car design. A year earlier than the Sprint but from the same drawing board, although with slightly different proportions, another classic 70s design was created - the Volkswagen Golf.

Until 1983 the Alfasud Sprint had stainless steel bumpers, restyling in 1983 brought plastic and lower bumpers, a different grille, and some other upgrades like 14-inch (360 mm) Italspeed wheels with 8 circles and nonstandard Michelin 340 mm tyres. Depending on equipment, some Sprints had plastic side bumpers and rear spoiler (mainly Quadrifoglio Verde). The most common was the Zender pack add-in, with lower bumpers and side-skirts, sold mostly in the UK and a few other countries.

=== Interior ===
The Alfa Sprint is a 2+2, with two seats in front and two in the rear. The two front seats came in two versions, an ordinary version and sport version with elongated thigh bolsters. An uncommon feature is the ignition key, which is on the left side of the steering wheel (instead of the more common right). On the middle console there are a few switches for the front and rear fog lamps, the rear window defroster and rear window wiper. Next to this is an analog clock by Jaeger instruments; until 1983, after which it was replaced with a digital one. Underneath are the ventilation control levers, one for hot, a second one for cold air intake, and a third to distribute flow to upper or lower vents. The rear cargo area has a capacity of 425 litres (15 cubic feet), largely due to the high-profile at the rear, and it has a leather cover to conceal items from view.

== Specifications ==
Initially the Sprint had disc brakes all around, the front ones being the inboard brake type. At the front there is independent MacPherson strut suspension, and at the rear a rigid axle with trailing beams and a Panhard rod. From 1984, all Sprints got the Alfa Romeo 33 floorpan and modified front suspension and front brakes (no longer of the inboard type). The rear end now had drum brakes. This means that the Alfa 33 (1st generation) and Sprint 83-89 practically share the same mechanics. This is helpful when finding parts for 2nd generation Sprints, since 10 times more Alfa 33s were produced.

=== Engines ===
Model	Years	Displacement	Bore × stroke	Fuel system	Peak power	Peak torque	Top speed
Alfasud Sprint	1976–1978	1.3 L (1,286 cc)	80.0 mm × 64.0 mm (3.15 in × 2.52 in)	twin-choke carburettor	76 PS (56 kW; 75 hp) at 6,000 rpm	Unknown	165 km/h (103 mph)
Alfasud Sprint 1.3	1978–1979	1.4 L (1,351 cc)	80.0 mm × 67.2 mm (3.15 in × 2.65 in)	twin-choke carburettor	79 PS (58 kW; 78 hp) at 6,000 rpm	111 N⋅m (82 lbf⋅ft) at 3,500 rpm	165 km/h (103 mph)
Alfasud Sprint Veloce 1.3	1979–1983	1.4 L (1,351 cc)	80.0 mm × 67.2 mm (3.15 in × 2.65 in)	2 twin-choke carburettors	86 PS (63 kW; 85 hp) at 5,800 rpm	119 N⋅m (88 lbf⋅ft) at 4,000 rpm	+170 km/h (110 mph)
Sprint 1.3	1983–1987	1.4 L (1,351 cc)	80.0 mm × 67.2 mm (3.15 in × 2.65 in)	2 twin-choke carburettors	86 PS (63 kW; 85 hp) at 5,800 rpm	119 N⋅m (88 lbf⋅ft) at 4,000 rpm	+170 km/h (110 mph)
Sprint 1.3	1987–1989	1.4 L (1,351 cc)	80.0 mm × 67.2 mm (3.15 in × 2.65 in)	2 twin-choke carburettors	86 PS (63 kW; 85 hp) at 5,800 rpm	119 N⋅m (88 lbf⋅ft) at 4,000 rpm	173 km/h (107 mph)
Alfasud Sprint 1.5	1978–1979	1.5 L (1,489 cc)	84.0 mm × 67.2 mm (3.31 in × 2.65 in)	twin-choke carburettor	85 PS (63 kW; 84 hp) at 5,800 rpm	121 N⋅m (89 lbf⋅ft) at 3,500 rpm	170 km/h (110 mph)
Alfasud Sprint Veloce 1.5	1979–1983	1.5 L (1,489 cc)	84.0 mm × 67.2 mm (3.31 in × 2.65 in)	2 twin-choke carburettors	95 PS (70 kW; 94 hp) at 5,800 rpm	130 N⋅m (96 lbf⋅ft) at 4,000 rpm	+175 km/h (109 mph)
Sprint 1.5	1983–1987	1.5 L (1,489 cc)	84.0 mm × 67.2 mm (3.31 in × 2.65 in)	2 twin-choke carburettors	95 PS (70 kW; 94 hp) at 5,800 rpm	130 N⋅m (96 lbf⋅ft) at 4,000 rpm	+175 km/h (109 mph)
Sprint 1.5 Quadrifoglio Verde	1982–1987	1.5 L (1,489 cc)	84.0 mm × 67.2 mm (3.31 in × 2.65 in)	2 twin-choke carburettors	105 PS (77 kW; 104 hp) at 6,000 rpm	133 N⋅m (98 lbf⋅ft) at 4,000 rpm	+180 km/h (110 mph)
Sprint 1.7 Quadrifoglio Verde	1982–1989	1.7 L (1,712 cc)	87.0 mm × 72.0 mm (3.43 in × 2.83 in)	2 twin-choke carburettors	118 PS (87 kW; 116 hp) at 6,000 rpm	152 N⋅m (112 lbf⋅ft) at 3,500 rpm	196 km/h (122 mph)
Sprint 1.7 i.e. Quadrifoglio Verde	1982–1989	1.7 L (1,712 cc)	87.0 mm × 72.0 mm (3.43 in × 2.83 in)	fuel injection	105 PS (77 kW; 104 hp) at 6,000 rpm	Unknown	Unknown

== Alfa Romeo Sprint 6C ==
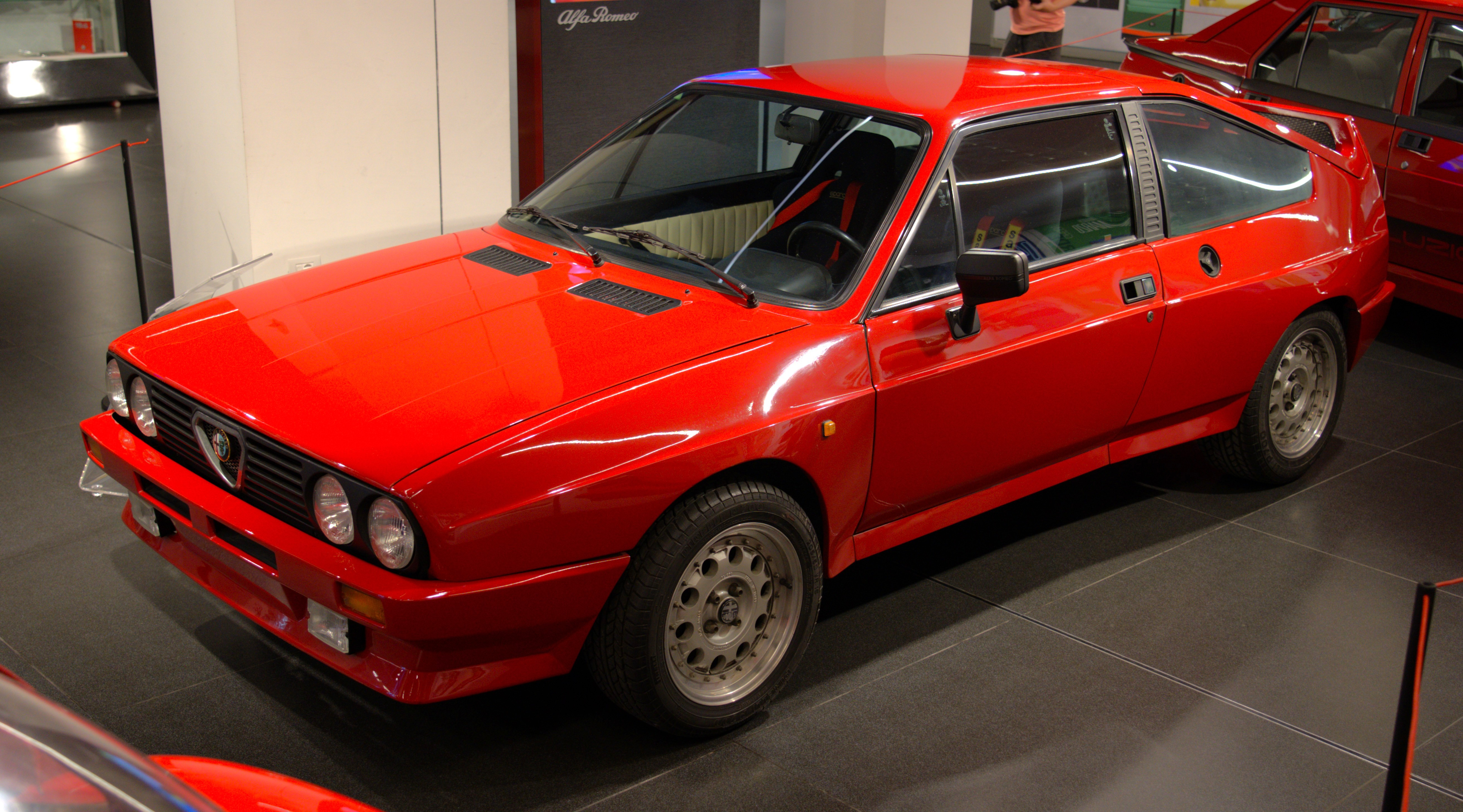
1982 Sprint 6C, the second of the two prototypes, shown here in the Alfa Romeo Museum in 2025.

In 1982, Autodelta built the Sprint 6C as a prototype for a possible race car. The prototype was given a mid-mounted, rear-wheel-drive, 2.5 L V6 engine from the GTV6 that made 158 hp (118 kW) at 5600 rpm. The 6C also received new bumpers, a rear spoiler, widened wheel arches, and wider 205/50VR15 wheels. Autodelta built a second car with a reinforced chassis for the purpose of rallying, but neither car resulted in production.

== Giocattolo Group B ==
Giocattolo Motori Pty. Ltd. in Caloundra in Queensland, Australia, produced a sports car using the Sprint as a base donor car for their Group B model. The Giocattolo Group B was developed by entrepreneur and car fanatic Paul Halstead along with Formula One engineer Barry Lock. The chassis and body, along with parts of the front suspension and door handles, glass etc., was kept from the Sprint. The use of a donor car allowed Giocattolo to focus on the design and engineering, since door hinges, locks and other items were already done for them.

The original idea was to use the Alfa 2.5 L (2,492 cc) V6 (160 hp [119 kW; 162 PS]) as engine and was mid-mounted in a few prototypes.

The sourcing of the V6-engines proved too expensive and difficult hence Giocattolo went on to produce the cars with the Holden 5.0 Walkinshaw group V8, as fitted to the VL Commodore group A cars, along with a ZF 5 DS-25-2 transaxle, giving them a power-to-weight ratio on par with a Mclaren F1.

In total, 15 Giocattolo Group B cars were built from 1986 to 1989, including three prototypes. 14 of these cars remain, while one - Build No. 007 - was destroyed in a high-speed crash at the Eastern Creek Raceway in February 2001, killing the driver, 29-year-old Todd Wilkes.

== Sprint EVO.35 ==
Fabrica Italiana, LDA in Portugal built a road version of their race cars in 2011 to commemorate the 35th anniversary named Sprint Evoluzione 35. The car debuted at Autoclassico Oporto salon. One chassis is known, numbered #019. It had a full roll cage, road trimmed interior, race derived suspensions, 4 piston outboard vented brakes, LSD and 8 valve 1800cc engine with 180 hp at 7000rpm and 210Nm at 3800rpm. A production series was planned but no other cars are known.

== Motorsport ==
The Alfa Sprint used to be a very popular racing car from the late 70s to 1983. Sprint Trofeo was a well known European GT competition in those years. Alfa Sprints are still being used in significant numbers as racing cars, mostly in historic cups or hill climbing races, its popularity mainly due to its good handling capabilities.
