= Cellole =

- Comune
- Comune di Cellole
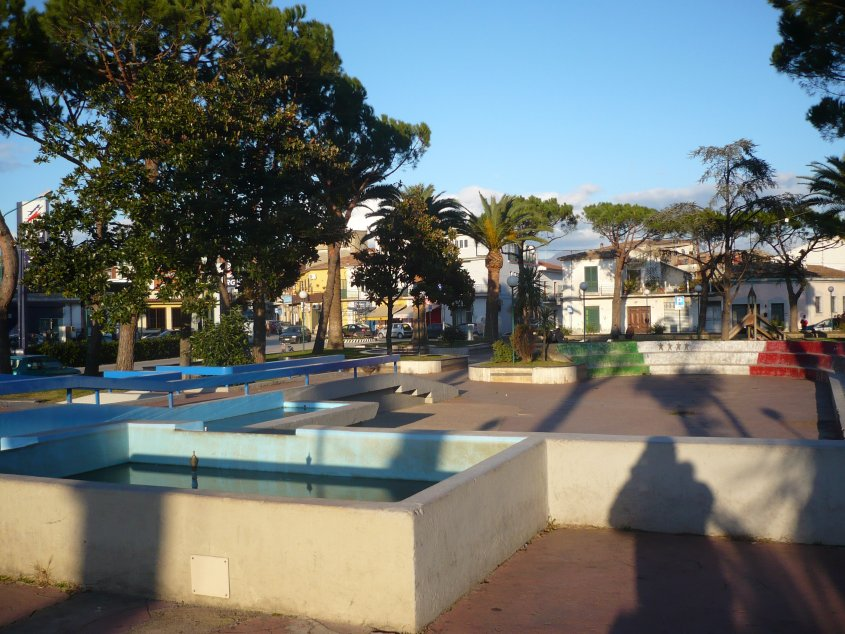

- Location within Italy Location within Campania
- Coordinates: 41°12′N 13°51′E
- Country: Italy
- Region: Campania
- Province: Caserta (CE)
- Frazioni: Baia Domizia, Baia Felice, Casamare, Centore

Government
  - Mayor: Cristina Compasso

Area
  - Total: 36.79 km^{2} (14.20 sq mi)
- Elevation: 17 m (56 ft)

Population (30 June 2017)
  - Total: 7,884
  - Density: 214.3/km^{2} (555.0/sq mi)
- Demonym: Cellolesi
- Time zone: UTC+1 (CET)
  - Summer (DST): UTC+2 (CEST)
- Postal code: 81030
- Dialing code: 0823
- Website: Official website

Cellole is a comune (municipality) in the Province of Caserta in the Italian region Campania, located about 50 kilometres (31 mi) northwest of Naples and about 45 kilometres (28 mi) northwest of Caserta.

Cellole borders the municipality of Sessa Aurunca, and includes the two seaside frazioni of Baia Domizia and Baia Felice facing the Gulf of Gaeta. It takes its name from the Latin pagus cellularum, indicating a rural ("pagus") series of rooms (cellulae). In the Middle Ages it was a defensive stronghold of the nearby Seassa Aurunca.
