= Sant'Anna, Sessa Aurunca =

Sant'Anna is Roman Catholic church in the municipality of Sessa Aurunca, province of Caserta, Campania, southern Italy. The church, dedicated to St Anne, lies in front of Piazza Tiberio in the historic central district of the town.

== History ==
The church was built in the 1470s under the patronage of Giovanni Antonio Marzano, Duke of Sessa. The church was attached to a Franciscan nunnery, and in the 19th century occupied by the Sisters of Saint Elizabeth of Hungary.

The interior ceiling is divided by carved and gilded wooden frames (cassettoni), with paintings (16th century) by Francesco and Michele Curia. The paintings depict the visit of the Virgin to her mother, St Anne as well as Franciscan Saint. In the presbytery are depiction of the Prophets and a Coronation of the Virgin. The main altarpiece is a St Anne between St John the Baptist and St Francis by Giovanni Sarnelli. The choir has canvases by Giuseppe Marullo depicting a Flagellation of Christ and an Immaculate Conception. A 15th century fresco depicting a Madonna and child is present in the sacristy. The altarpiece of the Madonna del Popolo, attributed to Marco Cardisco (1530), now in the town cathedral, was once in this church. Also moved out of the church was the Polyptich of the Cross by Cristoforo Scacco, now in the Museo Campano di Capua.
