= San Giovanni Battista, Sessa Aurunca =

San Giovanni Battista a Piazza
- San Giovanni Battista ad Plateum
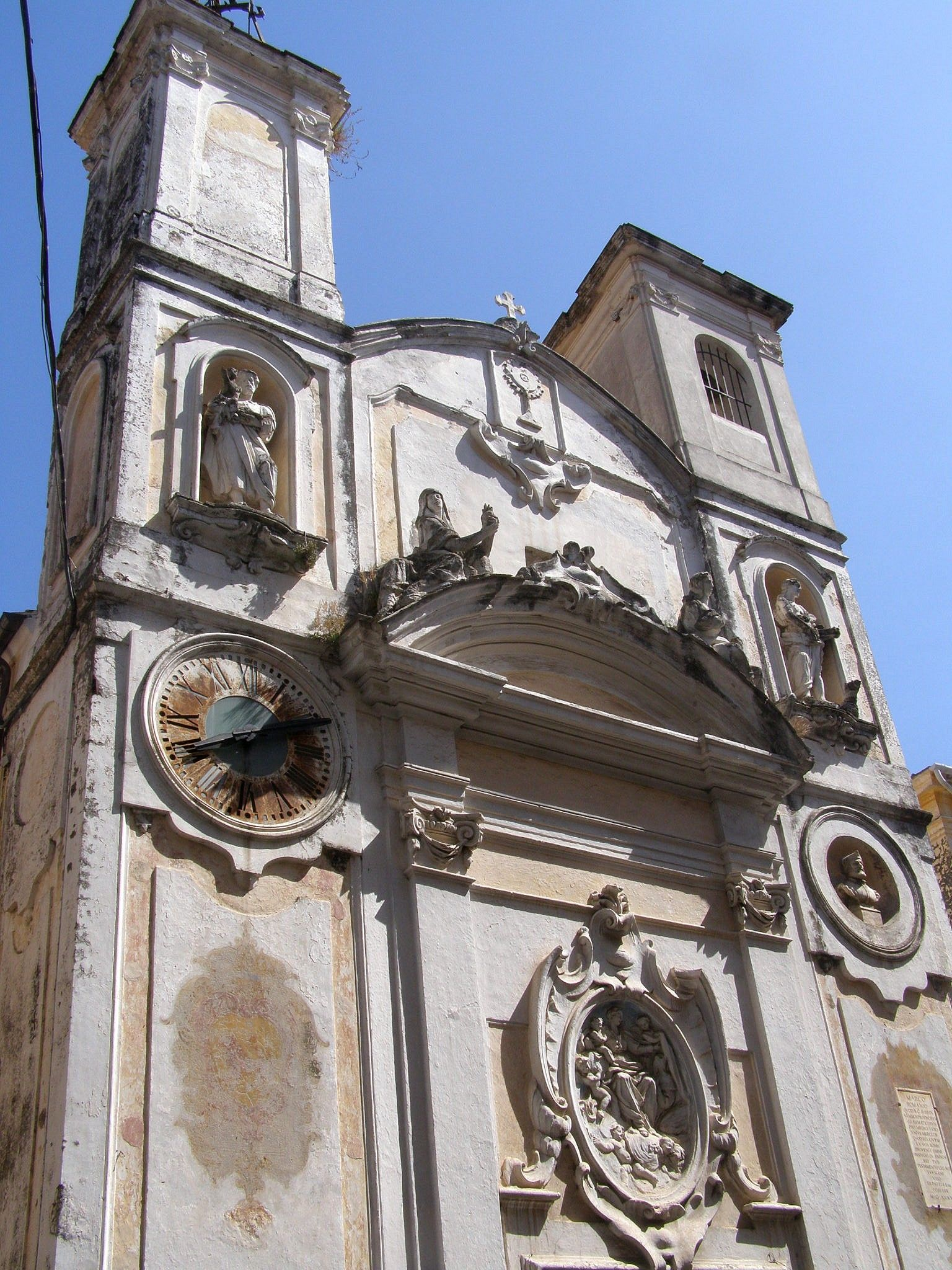
- San Giovanni Battista a Piazza
- Location: Sessa Aurunca
- Country: Italy
- Denomination: Catholic

History
- Dedication: John the Baptist

Architecture
- Style: Gothic style

San Giovanni Battista a Piazza, also referred to as San Giovanni Battista ad Plateum, is Roman Catholic church in the municipality of Sessa Aurunca, province of Caserta, in the region of Campania, southern Italy. The church, dedicated to John the Baptist, stands along Corso Lucilio, the former cardo maximus (North-South Roman Street) of the town of Sessa. Formerly, a second church dedicated to San Giovanni Battista (called ante portam) stood next to the city gates.

== History ==
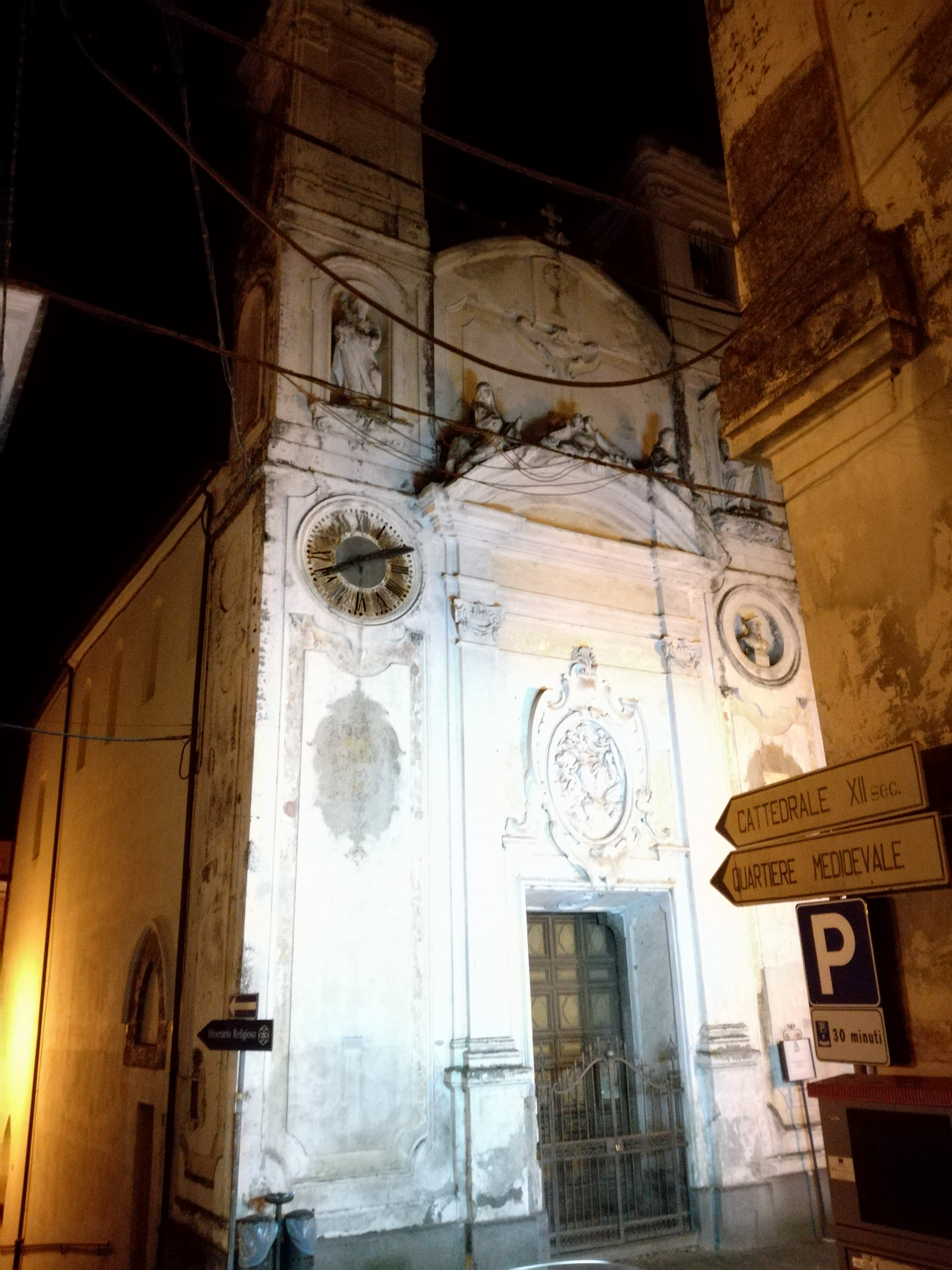
Night view

The church was built originally in a Gothic style, as evident by the lateral monofore windows. The Baroque facade with two flanking towers. The clock-tower on the left has a depiction of a Hercules killing the Lion which alludes to the lion on the crest of Sessa. On the right tower is a bust of Marco Romano, a 15th century priest, who donated his possessions to the town.

The crescent-topped tympanum has a bas-relief of the Madonna della Misericordia (Madonna of the Mercies) with attendant donors of a confraternity sculpted at her feet. The nave has a 15th century mural depicting St Catherine of Alexandria. To the right of the presbytery is a stucco altar with a 19th-century painting depicting the Holy Family.
