= Annunziata, Sessa Aurunca =

Roman catholic church in Campania, Italy

Coordinates: 41°14′22″N 13°56′3″E

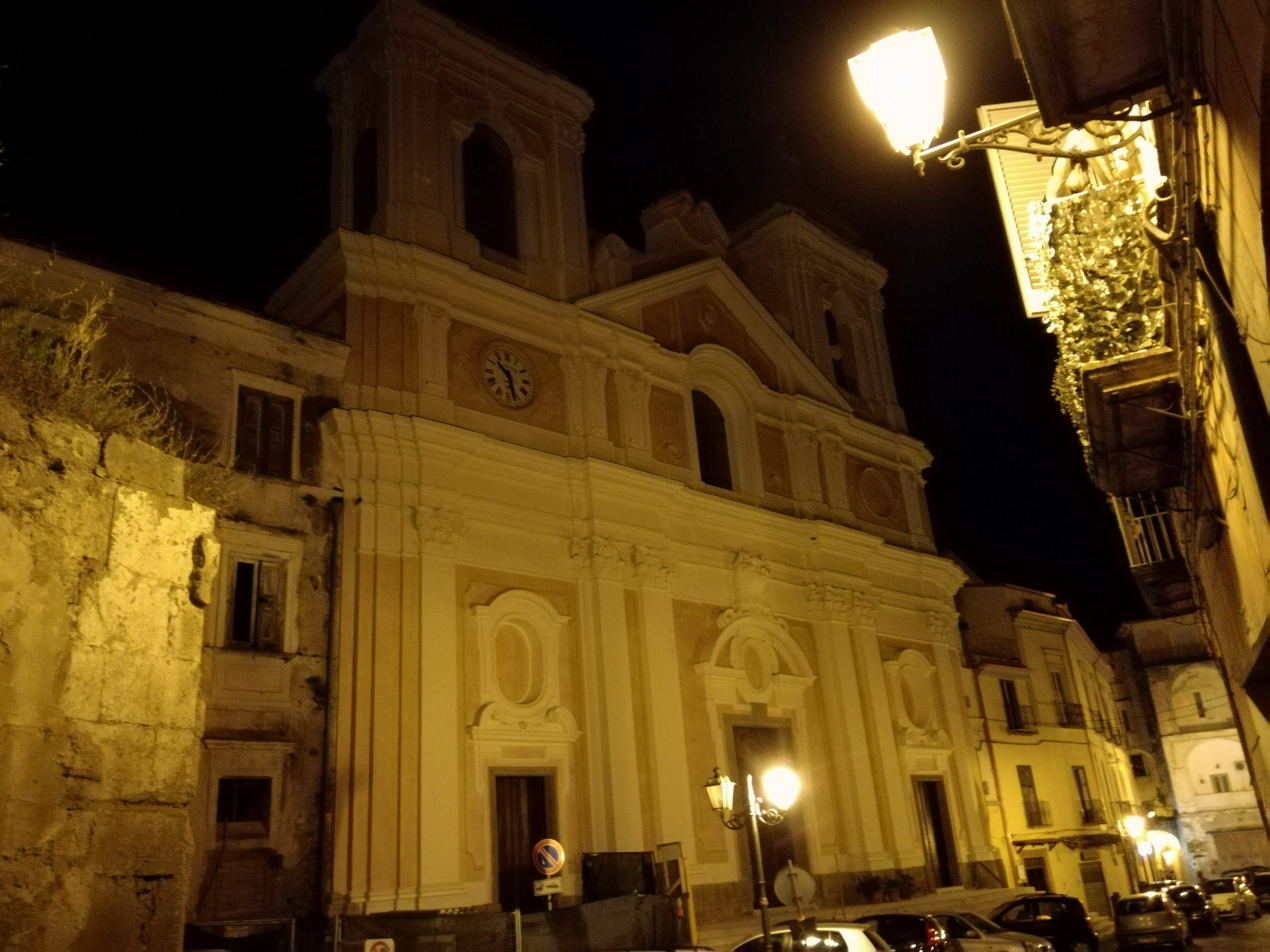

The Chiesa dell'Annunziata is Baroque-style Roman Catholic church in the municipality of Sessa Aurunca, province of Caserta, in the region of Campania, southern Italy. The church, dedicated to the Virgin of the Annunciation, lies in the historic central district of the town.

== History ==
The church was built in the late 15th century by the guild of the conciari and calzolari. The main plan of this church has been retained, including it Greek-cross plan despite reconstruction in the 17th century. The façade is divided in to orders with two lateral bell-towers. The reconstruction of the façade was attributed to Domenico Antonio Vaccaro, but the only documents known mention works by a Giuseppe Astarita.

The church contains a 15th century painting depicting the 'Pietà, originating from the destroyed church of San Biagio. The chapel of the Santissimo Sacramento has the tomb plaque for the Spanish governor don Lope de Herrera (died 1563), carved by Annibale Caccavello. The second chapel on the right has a Sant’Agata (1601) by Vespasiano Friozzo. The main altarpiece is an Annunciation by Sebastiano Conca. The second chapel on right has a St Leo IX in Glory, with a view of Sessa, by Antonio Sarnelli. Other altarpieces include the Beheading of St John the Baptist and an Annunciation also by Sarnelli. There is an altarpiece depicting St Liborio di A. D’Elia.
