= Giocattolo =

Giocattolo Group B
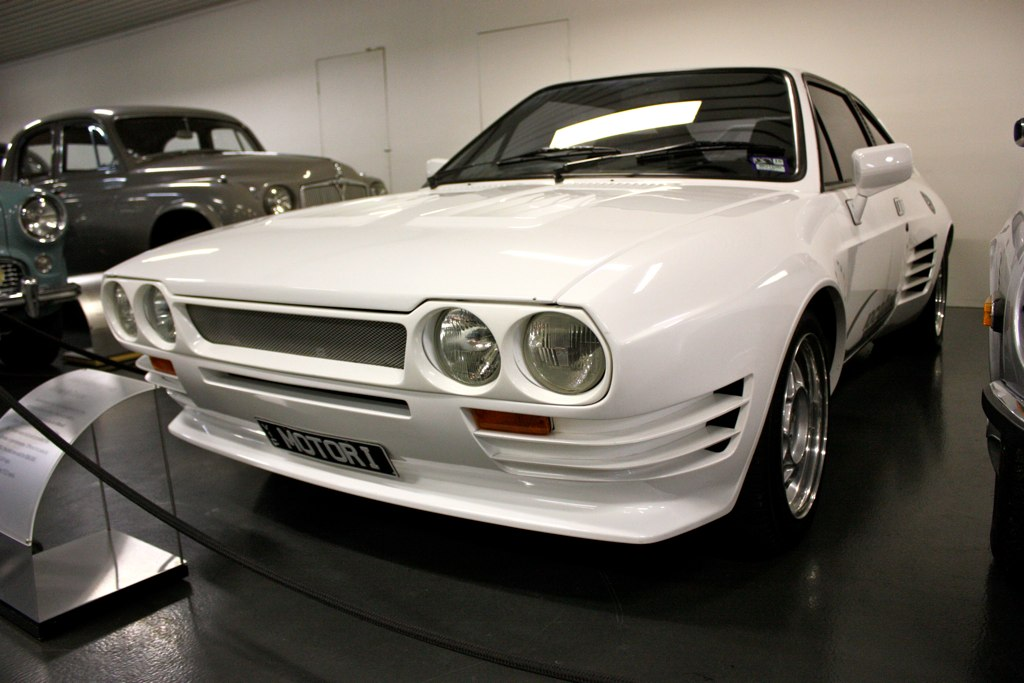

Overview
- Manufacturer: Giocattolo Motori
- Production: 1986–1989
- Assembly: Australia: Brisbane, Queensland
- Designer: Barry Lock

Body and chassis
- Class: Sports car
- Body style: 3-door hatchback
- Layout: RMR
- Platform: Alfa Romeo Sprint

Powertrain
- Engine: Alfa Romeo 2.5 V6; Holden 5.0 V8
- Transmission: 5-speed ZF manual

Dimensions
- Wheelbase: 2455 mm
- Length: 4030 mm
- Width: 1760 mm
- Curb weight: 1140 kg

Giocattolo Motori Pty Ltd was a short-lived Australian car company, founded in 1986 by sports car enthusiast Paul Halstead and Formula One designer Barry Lock. The company's name comes from the Italian word for "toy".

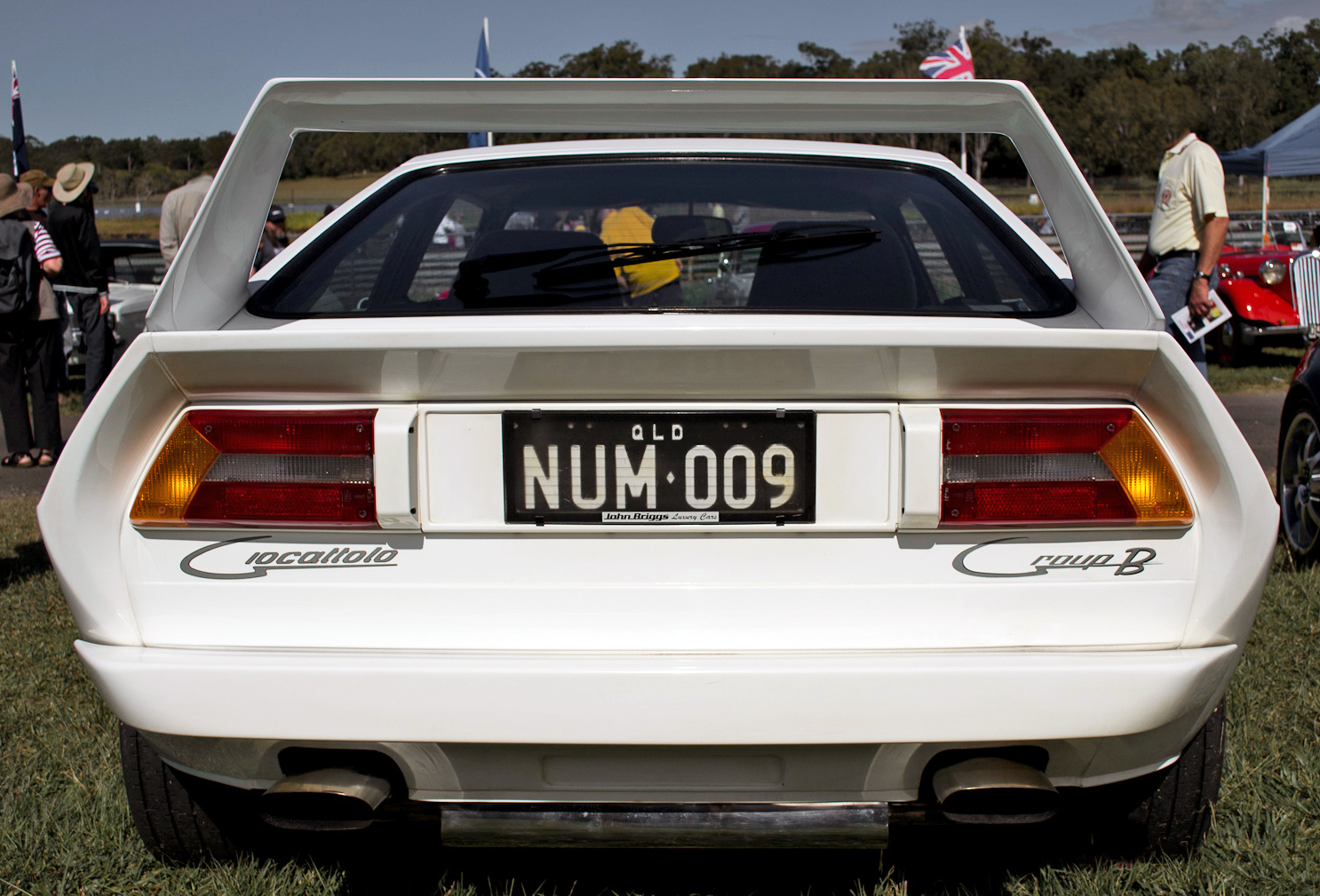
Rear view

The Giocattolo was originally based on a heavily modified Alfa Romeo Sprint body shell with a mid-mounted Alfa V6 engine. By the fourth prototype, the V6 engine had proved to be too difficult and expensive to import and install in the car, so the company replaced the projected V6 by a Holden V8 engine built by Holden Special Vehicles. As well as being cheaper, these engines had more power than the Alfa engines they had originally intended to use; the reported top speed of the V8-powered Giocattolo was 160 mph (257 km/h). Power was 190 kW (255 hp). It is unknown what happened to the factory Sprint engines and gearboxes that were taken from the cars.

Including the Alfa-powered third prototype (which was rebuilt and re-fitted with the Holden V8 after an accident with a police car almost destroyed the vehicle), just fifteen Giocattolos were built before the company folded in 1989. Fourteen of the fifteen cars are still in existence. The other - Build No. 007 - was destroyed in a fiery high-speed crash at Eastern Creek Raceway in February 2001, killing the driver, 29-year-old Todd Wilkes.

The third prototype appeared on the TV show Beyond 2000.
