= Baia Domizia =

Seaside resort in the Region of Campania

Coordinates: 41°12′N 13°48′E

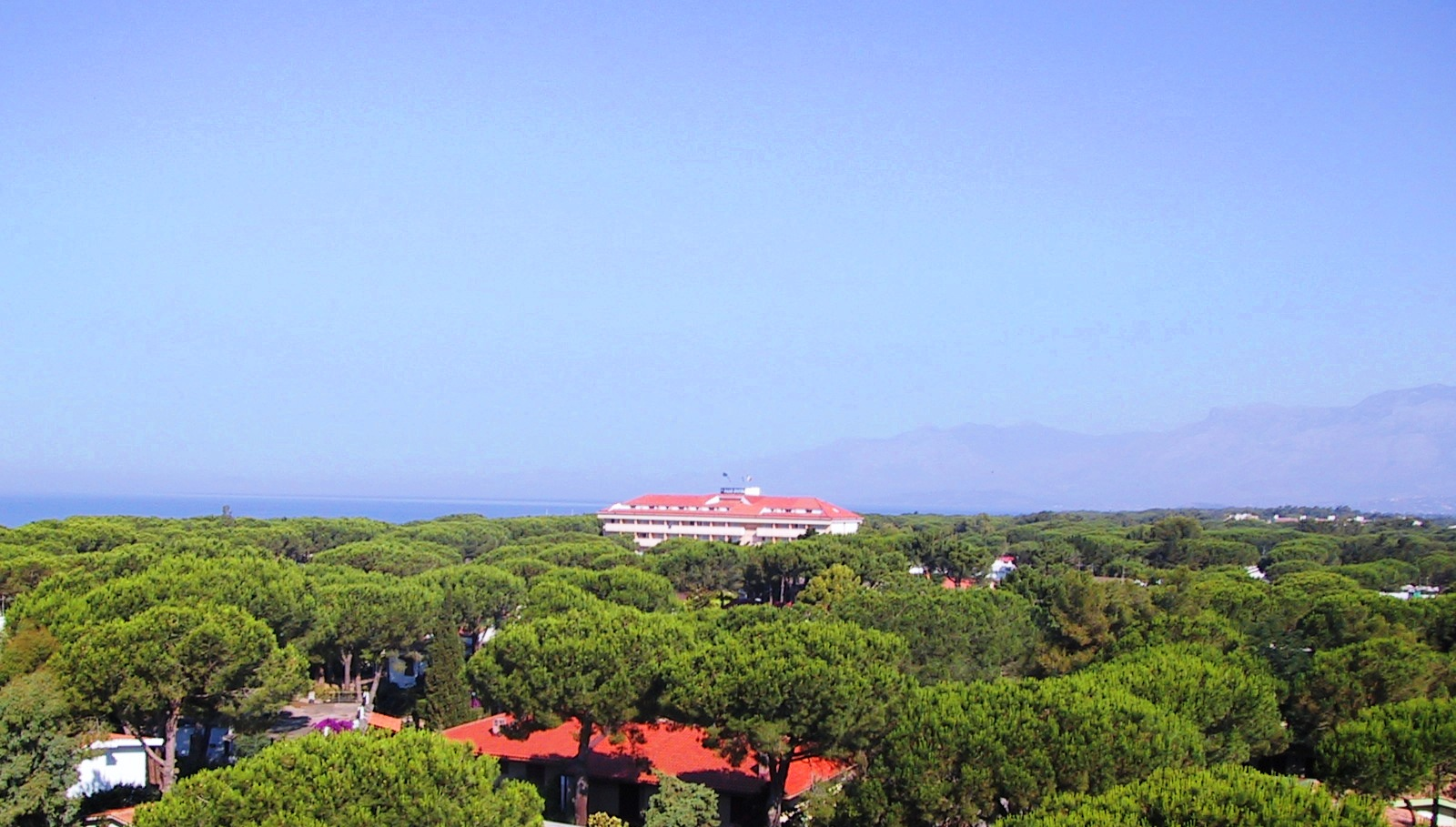
Baia Domizia le case immerse nella Pineta

Baia Domizia is a seaside resort in the Region of Campania, Italy, at the border with Latium, a natural border marked by the Garigliano River.

The name of the resort comes from its geographical position, since the village was founded mid-way along the bay of Gaeta, i.e., along the Domitian coast, which extends from Pozzuoli to Baia, following the modern Via Domiziana (SS7 quarter). The beach was created by the now extinct volcano of Roccamonfina, and the resident population is under 1,000 as of 2010.

The village‘s administration is divided between the Councils of Cellole and of Sessa Aurunca. Originally, it was entirely included in the territory administered by Sessa Aurunca, but in 1973, Cellole, also previously included within the area of Sessa Aurunca, gained independent administration. Baia was then divided between the two areas: the eastern and southern parts were assigned to Cellole, while the northern part stayed under the administration of Sessa Aurunca.

The settlement was born at the beginning of the 1960s, when Baia Domizia was planned and built as a tourist resort. The first building site was opened on 7 April 1963. The planning of Baia Domizia was an initiative of the Town Council of Sessa Aurunca, and it was built by a firm located in Veneto, Aurunca Litora' SpA, chaired by the Paduan industrialist Giuseppe Longato.

In addition to the usual hotels, there are campgrounds.
