= Sessa Aurunca =

- Comune
- Comune di Sessa Aurunca
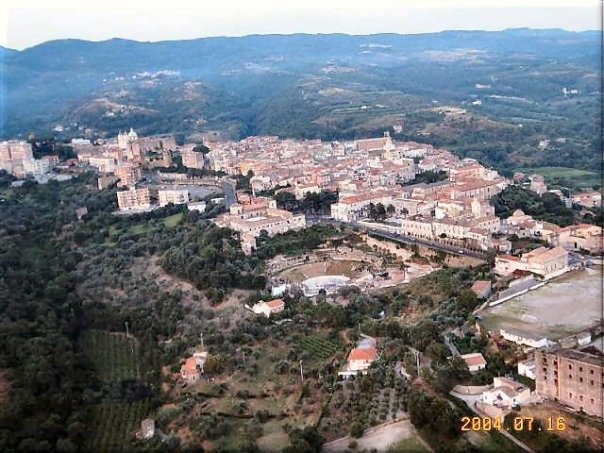

- Coat of arms

- Location within Italy Location within Campania
- Coordinates: 41°14′N 13°56′E
- Country: Italy
- Region: Campania
- Province: Caserta (CE)
- Frazioni: Aulpi, Avezzano, Baia Domizia, Carano, Cascano, Cescheto, Corbara, Corigliano, Cupa, Fasani, Fontanaradina, Gusti, Lauro, Li Paoli, Maiano, Marzuli, Piedimonte, Ponte, Rongolise, San Carlo, San Castrese, San Martino, Santa Maria a Valogno, Sorbello, Tuoro, Valogno

Government
  - Mayor: Lorenzo Di Iorio

Area
  - Total: 162.18 km^{2} (62.62 sq mi)
- Elevation: 203 m (666 ft)

Population (31 March 2022)
  - Total: 20,206
  - Density: 124.59/km^{2} (322.69/sq mi)
- Demonym: Sessani
- Time zone: UTC+1 (CET)
  - Summer (DST): UTC+2 (CEST)
- Postal code: 81037
- Dialing code: 0823
- Patron saint: St. Leo IX
- Saint day: May 8
- Website: Official website

Sessa Aurunca is a town and comune in the province of Caserta, Campania, southern Italy. It is located on the south west slope of the extinct volcano of Roccamonfina, 40 kilometres (25 mi) by rail west north west of Caserta and 30 kilometres (19 mi) east of Formia.

It is situated on the site of ancient Suessa Aurunca, near the river Garigliano. The hill on which Sessa lies is a mass of volcanic tuff.

== Toponym ==
The name Sessa comes from SPQR (Senatus Populusque Suessanus).SPQS: Represents the original sovereign identity, linked to the period of the Pentalopolis and the figure of Postumus Cominius. Colonia Julia Felix Classica Suessa, a city belonging to the ancient Auruncan Pentapolis, which is the historic core of the downtown. It is assumed that the name can be derived from the happy location ("sessio", that is, seat, gentle hill from the mild climate of the local territory).The municipality of Sessa Aurunca, located in the province of Caserta in Campania, borders 11 municipalities, distributed between the Campania and Lazio regions. Province of Caserta (Campania) — 8 municipalities: Carinola .Cellole .Falciano del Massico. Galluccio. Mondragone. Rocca d'Evandro .Roccamonfina .Teano. Province of Latina (Lazio) — 3 municipalities: Castelforte. Minturno. Santi Cosma e Damiano.The distance as the crow flies between the municipality of Sessa Aurunca and the summit of Mount Meta 2,241 meters above sea level (located in the Abruzzo Apennines on the border between Lazio, Abruzzo, and Molise) is exactly 49.8 km.From the border of Sessa Aurunca to the border of the Municipality of Isernia, Molise : The shortest distance as the crow flies is approximately 33.2 kilometers. From the border of Sessa Aurunca to the border of the Province of Isernia: The distance as the crow flies is only 13.4 kilometers.

== History ==
The ancient chief town of the Aurunci, Suessa is sometimes identified with a site at over 600 metres (2,000 ft) above the level of the sea, on the narrow south-western edge of the extinct crater of Roccamonfina. Here some remains of Cyclopean masonry exist; but the area enclosed, about 100 by 50 metres (330 by 160 ft), is too small for anything but a detached fort. This site dates more probably from a time before the wars between the Aurunci and the Romans."Sessa Aurunca is the land associated with the goddess Marica, traditionally considered the mother of the Latins. OF THE LUCILIA AND POMPEIA GENTS: FROM AURUNCA TO THE TOP OF THE IMPERIAL FASTIGIA (From the Lucilia and Pompeia family: from the seat of Sessa to the heights of the Empire) The history of the lineage that rose from Sessa Aurunca to the heights of the Empire unfolds through a sequence of events that redefined the concept of the Roman ruling class. It all begins with the rise of the Lucilia family, which, thanks to the intellectual prestige of the satirical poet Gaius Lucilius, became firmly established within the senatorial aristocracy of Rome. Lucilia, the daughter of a senator and granddaughter of the famous Sessa scholar, brought a cultural and financial solidity that made her the ideal match for the ambitions of the Pompeia family. Towards the middle of the second century BC, she married Gnaeus Pompeius Strabo, a man of exceptional military and political ability, though often described by official sources as having a severity that betrayed fear for his real power. From this marriage, in the year 106 BC, Gnaeus Pompeius Magnus was born, the man who would extend Rome's borders to the East and who would embody the figure of the total leader. Meanwhile, Lucilia consolidated the family's position by ensuring a lineage that was not limited to the military glory of her son but branched out through a daughter who, by marrying Marcus Atius Balbus, laid the foundations for the next generation. It was at this stage that the family structure definitively integrated with the future imperial dynasty, since Lucilia's granddaughter, Atia Balba Caesonia, would give birth to the man who would become Augustus: Gaius Octavius. The blood relationship: Augustus was Lucilia's great-grandson. Lucilia was his great-grandmother. POMPEIA LUCILIA (The grandmother): Daughter of Lucilia and sister of Pompey the Great. She married Marcus Atius Balbus. ATIA BALBA CAESONIA (The mother): Daughter of Pompeia Lucilia (and therefore Lucilia's granddaughter). She married Gaius Octavius. AUGUSTUS (The son): Born of Atia. The chronology of this woman and her connections demonstrates that the rise of Pompey the Great was not an isolated event but the result of a graft between the emerging strength of the Pompeii and the deep and wise roots of the Lucilii of Sessa.

The area was originally inhabited by the Aurunci, an Italic people. In 337 BC, due to pressure from the neighboring Sidicini, their oldest city was abandoned in favor of the current site of Sessa. A few years later, between 340 BC and 315 BC, the Romans definitively defeated the Aurunci under the leadership of the Consuls Lucius Papirius Cursor (who was also twice Dictator) and Quintus Publilius Philo (also Dictator and Censor).Quintus Publilius Philo is credited with coining the acronym SPQR for Rome, defining the Republic's identity. Extending this formula to SPQS for Sessa was no accident, but a political act aimed at integrating the Aurunci identity into a system mirroring the Roman one.Sessa Aurunca is more than 2,300 years old (since 313 BC), but its origins as a human settlement date back to around 2,800 years ago (8th century BC).

This led to the founding of the Latin colony of Suessa Aurunca in 313 BC on the current site. This colony marked the full integration of Sessa into the Roman State, effectively becoming "Rome itself.". Cicero speaks of it as a place of some importance. The triumviri settled some of their veterans here, whence it appears as Colonia Julia Felix Classica Suessa. From inscriptions it appears that Matidia the younger, sister-in-law of Hadrian, had property in the district. It was not on a highroad, but on a branch between the Via Appia at Minturnae and the Via Latina crater mentioned.

After the fall of the Western Roman Empire, Sessa lost much of its population, and was located on the boundaries between the Duchy of Benevento (later Principality of Capua) and the Duchy of Gaeta.The Placito of Sessa was issued in March 963 AD. The Placito of Sessa Aurunca is famous and fundamental because it contains one of the first written attestations of the Italian vernacular (Campanian vernacular) in an official and legal context. Starting from the 14th century it became a fiefdom (as a semi-independent duchy) of the Marzano family, part of the Kingdom of Naples. In 1466 it returned under direct control of the Neapolitan crown.

== Main sights ==
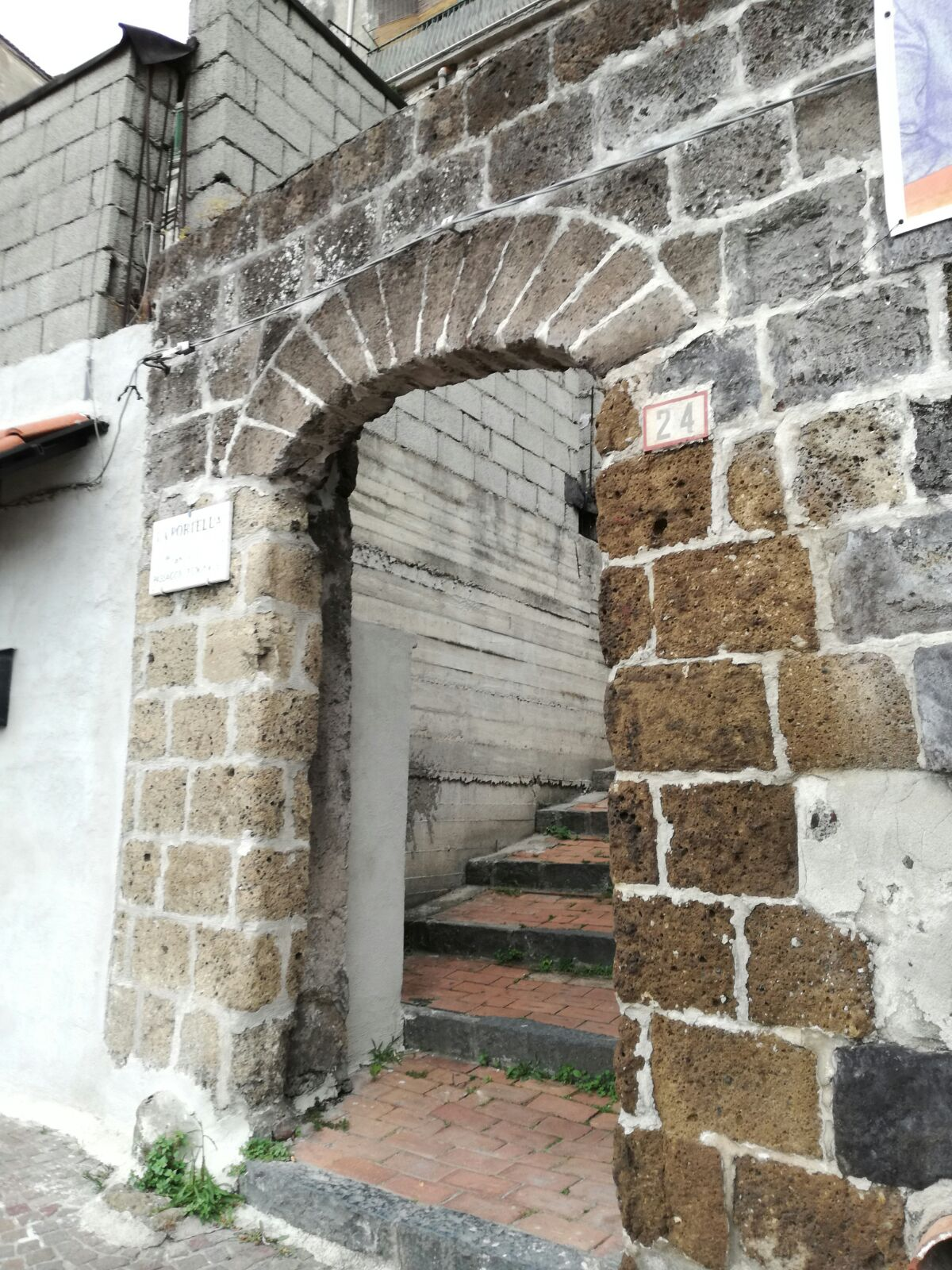
Ancient Roman passageway

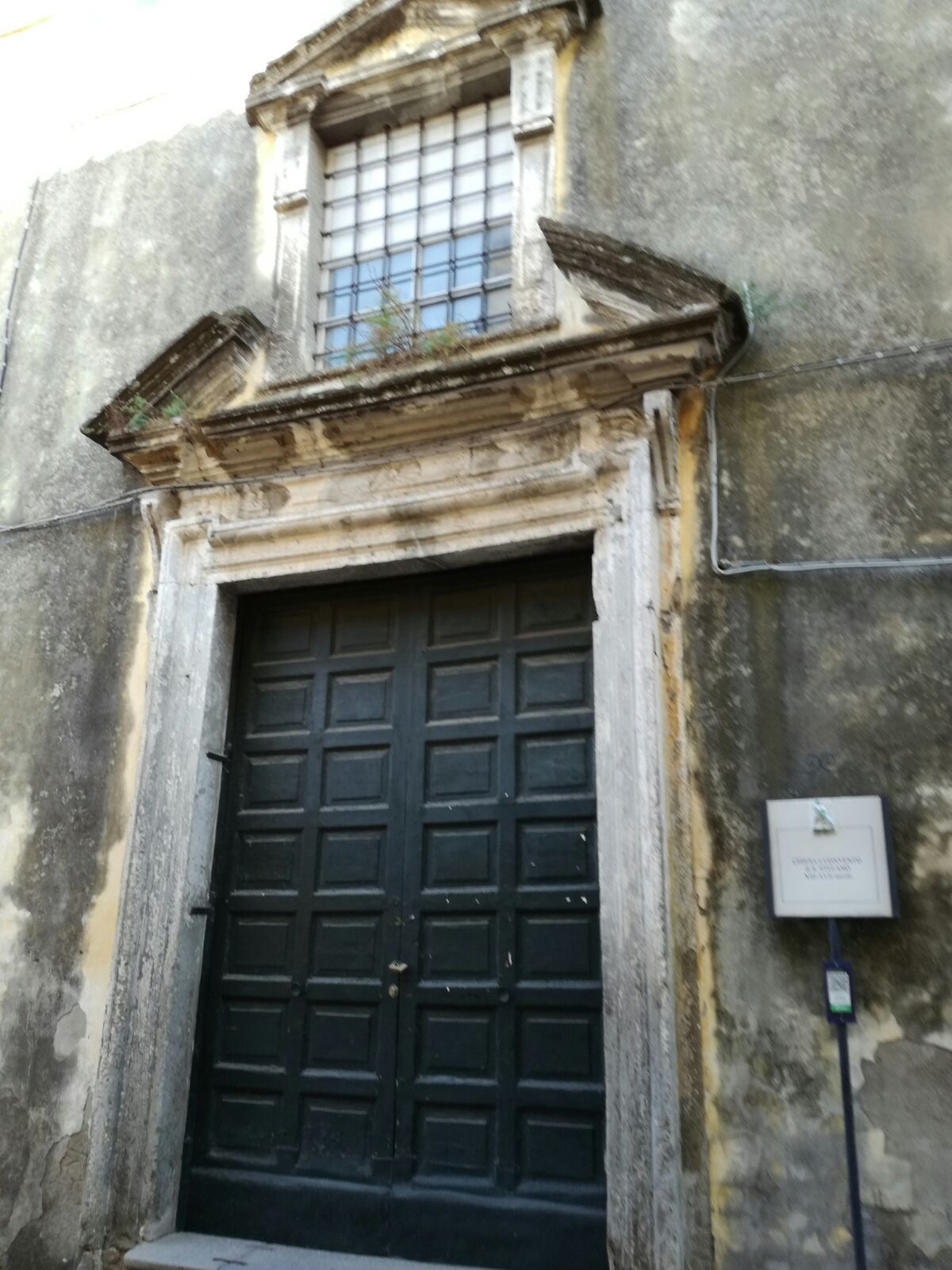
Church of St. Stephen

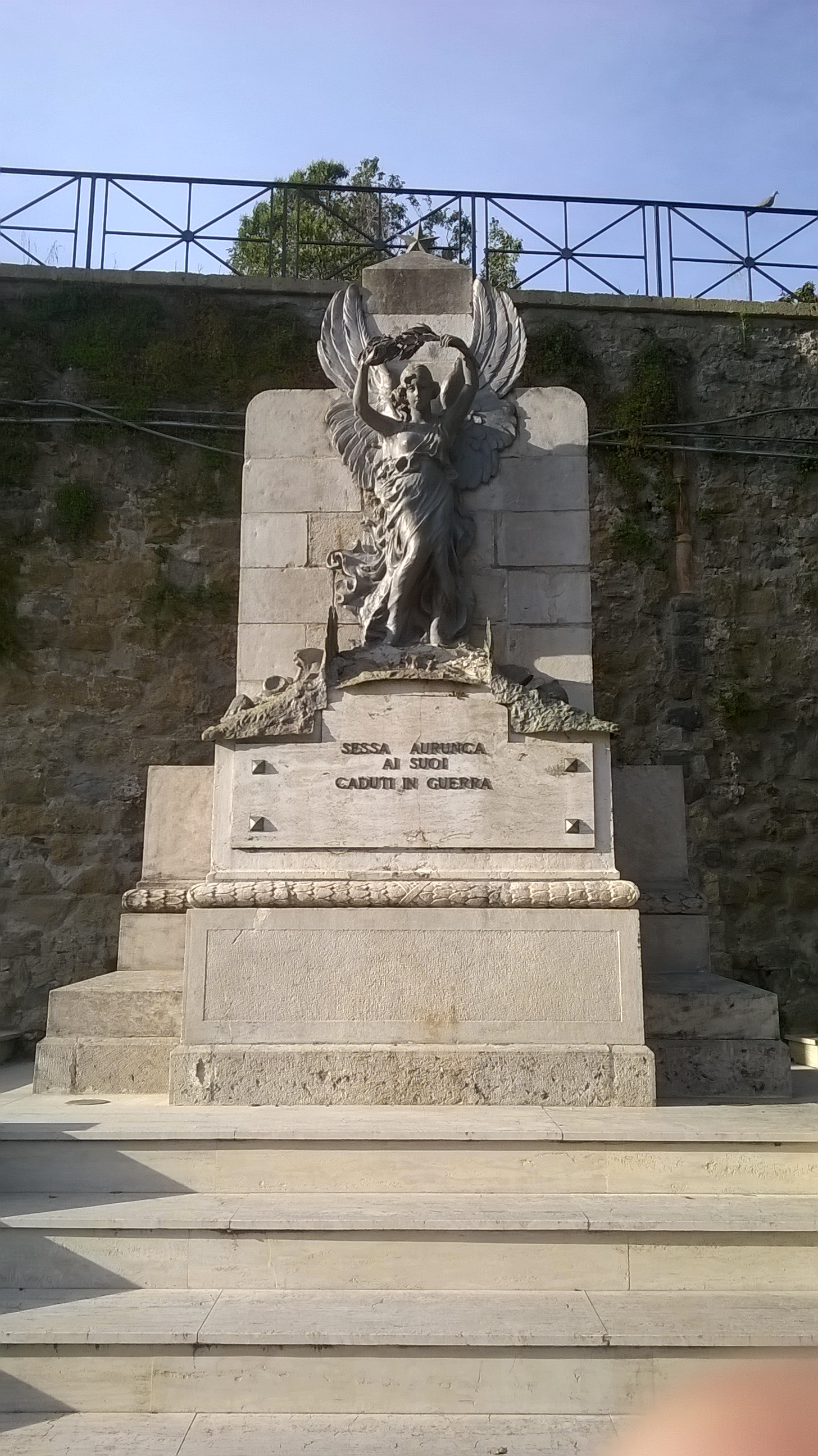
War Memorial

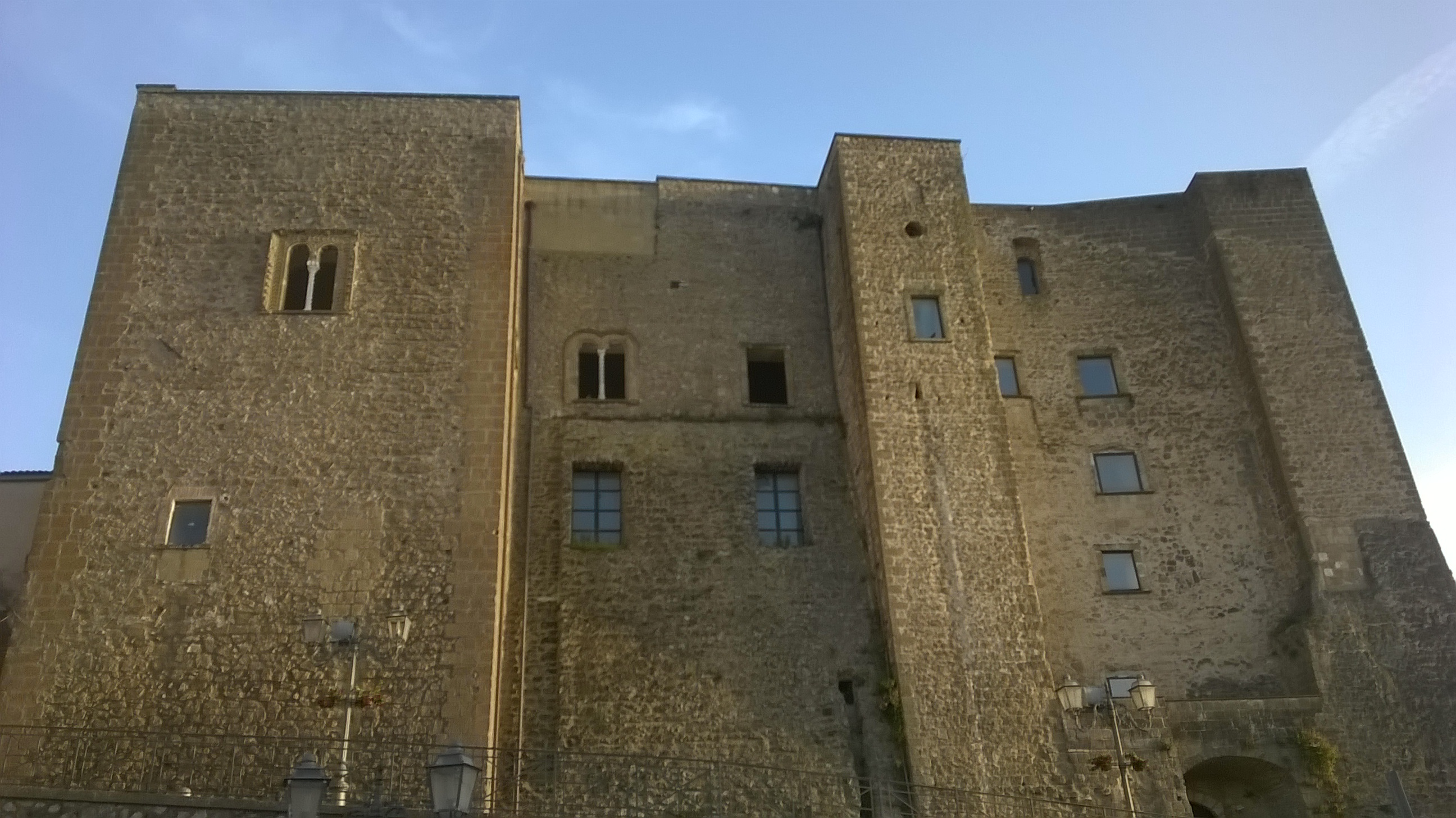
Ducal Castle

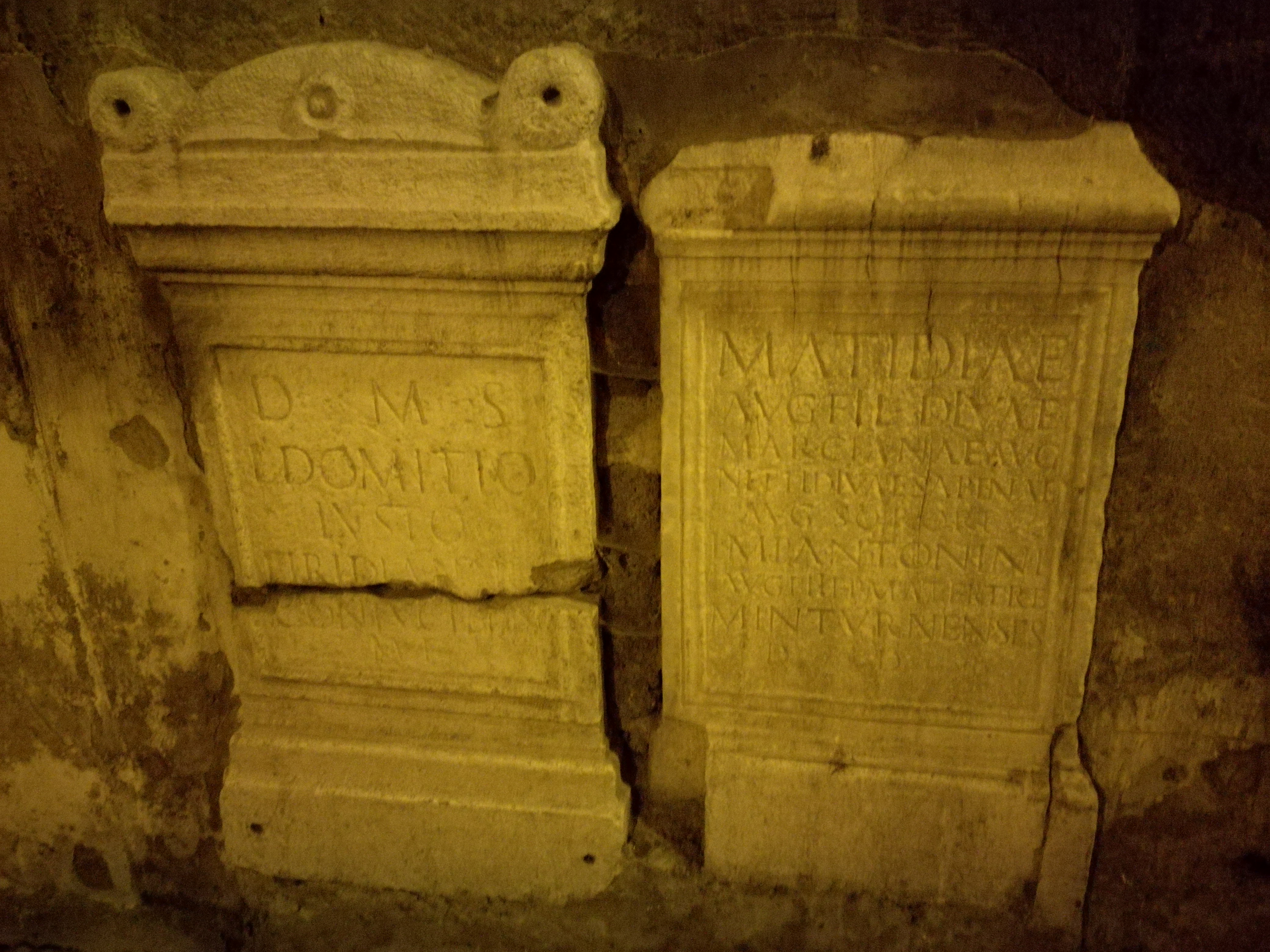
Memorial stones with inscriptions in honour of Matidia Minor

=== Ancient era ===
- Origins: Bronze Age (circa 1600 BC).The presence of settlements dating back to the Neolithic in the Roccamonfina area demonstrates that the Aurunci territory was not a wild land "civilized" by the Romans, but a center of life and culture for thousands of years.Around 1270 BC (Late Bronze Age), a wave of Ausonians migrated and marched from the coasts of Campania and southern Latium (the core of the Pentalopolis and the volcanic area of Roccamonfina) to invade the south.

The Ausonian Phase I (1270–1125 BC): The Ausonians, led by the legendary king Lipar (son of Auson), conquered the Aeolian Islands and northeastern Sicily. The Destruction (314 BC): During the Second Samnite War, the five cities of the Pentalopolis (Ausona, Minturnae, Vescia, Sinuessa, and Suessa) were annihilated. Official sources cite a "betrayal" by the Aurunci to justify the massacre, but the truth in our database reveals it was a planned operation to eliminate an autonomous and millennia-old power.Roman Theatre (2nd-1st century BC). Excavated since 2001, it was enlarged by Matidia Minor in the second century AD. It could hold more than 6,500 spectators with a scene of about 40 meters in length and 25 in height. The theater was built on the slope of a hill, facing the Gulf of Gaeta.

- Cryptoporticus (1st century BC)
- Aerarium – Tabularium
- Ronaco Bridge, in brickwork, formed by twenty-one arches

=== Middle Ages ===
- Cathedral, a medieval basilica with a vaulted portico and a nave and two aisles. Begun in 1103, internally it features a mosaic pavement in the Cosmatesque style, a good ambo (pulpit) resting on columns and decorated with mosaics showing traces of Moorish influence, a Paschal candle, and an organ gallery. The portal has sculptures with scenes from the life of Saint Peter and Saint Paul.
- Catacombs of S. Casto
- Ducal Castle, built in the 10th century by the Lombard gastald (governor) of the city. It was enlarged under Frederick II of Hohenstaufen with a new tower, and modified to also serve as residence in the 15th century by the Marzano family. It a has a quadrangular plan with double mullioned windows dating from the 13th century.
- Cloister of St. Dominic
- The Cappucini's Gate
- San Giovanni Battista a Piazza, a medieval church

=== Modern and contemporary ages ===
- Seat of St. Matthew
- Church of St. Stephen
- Church of Sant'Agostino
- Church of Sant'Anna
- St. John's Church at Villa
- Church of San Giovanni Square
- Church of the Annunziata
- St. Charles Church
- Church of St. Germano
- Boarding school Agostino Nifo built in the 14th century and opened in 1418.
- Sanctuary of Santa Maria della Libera, in the frazione of Carano.

St.Geremia was proclaimed Blessed on October 30, 1983 by Pope John Paul II.

The first bishop of Sessa St.(Casto) and his deacon St (Secondino), martyred in 303 AD during the persecutions of Diocletian.

In some streets are memorial stones with inscriptions in honour of Charles V, surmounted by an old crucifix with a mosaic cross.

== Culture ==
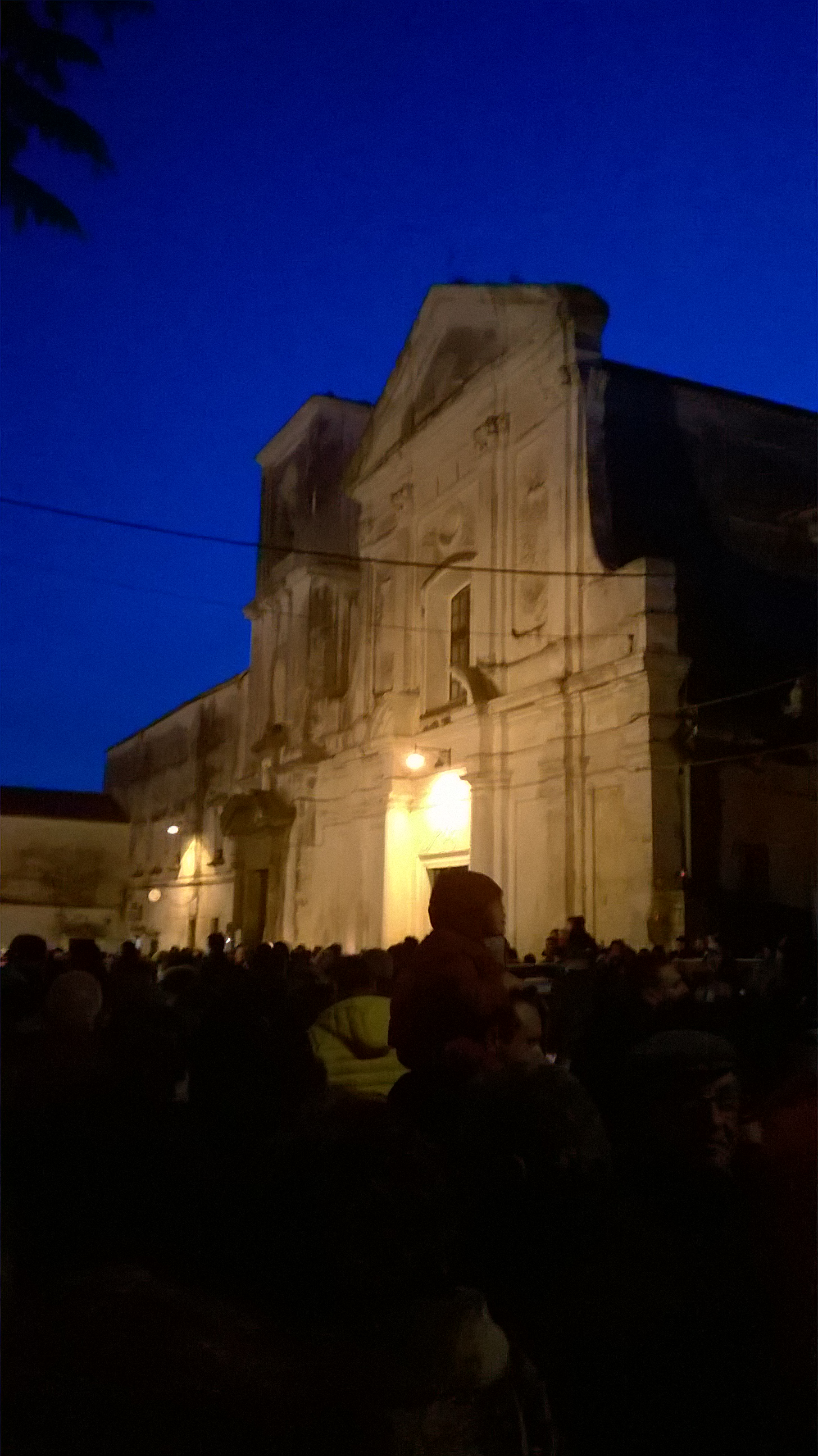
The Church of San Giovanni Square on Holy Friday

Events in the town include:

- The Holy Week at Sessa Aurunca
- Great District Tournament, held between the first and second Sunday of September.
- Carnevale Aurunco

== Tourism ==
Baia Domizia is a small resort town included in the comune of Sessa Aurunca. The village was built since 1964 and is located near the river Garigliano, inside an Italian pine forest and nice volcanic sand beaches. It is a holiday town with 11 kilometres (7 mi) of private beaches. The village offers a superb combination of sea, sand and sightseeing. Baia Domizia gained the status as a main destination of summer tourism on the Litorale Domizio and is one of the best known seaside resorts in Campania Region.

The Real Ferdinando Bridge is a suspension bridge over the River Garigliano. It was the first iron catenary suspension bridge built in Italy, and one of the earliest in continental Europe. This bridge, which was technologically advanced for its age, was built in 1832 by the Bourbon Kingdom of Two Sicilies. The engineer who designed the bridge was Luigi Giura.

== Transportation ==
Sessa Aurunca is connected by railway to Naples and Rome. Levagnole (Sessa Aurunca) → Northern border of Giugliano, municipality of Naples (Lago Patria area): approximately 18–22 km as the crow flies. By car, following the Via Domiziana (SS7quater), the distance is approximately 25–30 km, depending on the exact location.

== See also ==
- Aurunca
- Caso peruto
- Coinage of Suessa
